= Women's suffrage by country =

Women's suffrage, the right of women to vote in elections, emerged as a transformative movement in the 19th and 20th centuries, marking a critical turning point in the struggle for gender equality. While some countries achieved universal suffrage early in the 20th century—such as Finland and New Zealand—others faced decades of resistance, with many women in Africa, Asia, the Americas, and Europe battling deeply entrenched patriarchal structures and legal barriers to claim their rightful place in political life.

== Africa ==
=== Algeria ===
Women's suffrage was in place in Algeria from 1962.

Women's suffrage was introduced in Algeria by the French colonial authorities after a long struggle, and confirmed after Algeria became an independent nation in 1962. Women's suffrage was introduced in France in 1944. This right automatically included French women residing in French Algeria; but it did not include Muslim Algerian women, since indigenous Algerians was not governed by French law, but indigenous Islamic law.

The advocates of women's suffrage raised the question of an extension of suffrage to Muslim women in Algeria to the French National Assembly in 1947; in September 1947 the Organic Statute was passed which granted citizenship to Muslim women in Algeria, but Article 4 of the statue gave the Algerian Assembly free choice to decide when to exercise and introduce that reform. In 1949 the Justrabo Proposal put forvard in the Algerian Assembly suggested to extend suffrage to educated Muslim women, which was a very small minority, but the suggestion did not pass.

When the UN created the Commission on the Status of Women (CSW) the French UN-delegate Marie-Hélène Lefaucheux worked to have France ratify it to force them to introduce suffrage in Algeria. She succeeded on 20 December 1952 when General Assembly adopted the Convention on the Political Rights of Women. After this, there was great pressure on France to introduce this reform in the Algerian colony. The French colonial authorities finally passed women's suffrage in 1958.

Algeria became an independent nation in 1962, and the Algerian Constitution of 1962 confirmed the existing equal political rights to vote and be elected to all citizens.

=== Egypt ===
The struggle for women's suffrage in Egypt first sparked from the nationalist 1919 Revolution in which women of all classes took to the streets in protest against the British occupation. The struggle was led by several Egyptian women's rights pioneers in the first half of the 20th century through protest, journalism, and lobbying, and through women's organizations, primarily the Egyptian Feminist Union (EFU). President Gamal Abdel-Nasser consolidated women's suffrage in 1956 after they were denied the vote in elections for the Egyptian government under the British, who suppressed popular movement and interfered with democratic processes in parliament under the Egyptian monarchy.

=== Liberia ===
In 1920, the women's movement organized in the National Liberian Women's Social and Political Movement, who campaigned without success for women's suffrage, followed by the Liberia Women's League and the Liberian Women's Social and Political Movement, and in 1946, limited suffrage was finally introduced for women of the privileged Libero-American elite, and expanded to universal women's suffrage in 1951.

=== Libya ===
In Kingdom of Libya (1951–1969) the 1951 Constitution did secure women basic rights, since they were not excluded from the rights granted to all citizens under the constitution. A women's movement was organized by a minority of educated urban elite women who wished to secure women equal rights, starting with the first women's association in Benghazi 1955, followed by one in Tripoli in 1957.

The municipal suffrage was granted in 1951. The Constitution of 1963 extended the suffrage to women.

=== Morocco ===
Women's suffrage was introduced in Morocco in 1963.

The right to vote was technically granted for both the local and national levels on 1 September 1959. This right was however not enforced until 18 June 1963.

The first woman was elected to Parliament in 1993, thirty years after women first participated in the election as voters.

=== Sierra Leone ===
One of the first occasions when women were able to vote was in the elections of the Nova Scotian settlers at Freetown. In the 1792 elections, all heads of household could vote and one-third were ethnic African women. Women won the right to vote in Sierra Leone in 1930.

=== South Africa ===
The campaign for women's suffrage was conducted largely by the Women's Enfranchisement Association of the Union, which was founded in 1911.

The franchise was extended to white women 21 years or older by the Women's Enfranchisement Act, 1930. The first general election at which women could vote was the 1933 election. At that election Leila Reitz (wife of Deneys Reitz) was elected as the first female MP, representing Parktown for the South African Party. The limited voting rights available to non-white men in the Cape Province and Natal (Transvaal and the Orange Free State practically denied all non-whites the right to vote, and had also done so to white foreign nationals when independent in the 1800s) were not extended to women, and were themselves progressively eliminated between 1936 and 1968.

The right to vote for the Transkei Legislative Assembly, established in 1963 for the Transkei bantustan, was granted to all adult citizens of the Transkei, including women. Similar provision was made for the Legislative Assemblies created for other bantustans. All adult coloured citizens were eligible to vote for the Coloured Persons Representative Council, which was established in 1968 with limited legislative powers; the council was however abolished in 1980. Similarly, all adult Indian citizens were eligible to vote for the South African Indian Council in 1981. In 1984 the Tricameral Parliament was established, and the right to vote for the House of Representatives and House of Delegates was granted to all adult Coloured and Indian citizens, respectively.

In 1994 the bantustans and the Tricameral Parliament were abolished and the right to vote for the National Assembly was granted to all adult citizens.

=== Southern Rhodesia ===
Southern Rhodesian white women won the vote in 1919 and Ethel Tawse Jollie (1875–1950) was elected to the Southern Rhodesia legislature 1920–1928, the first woman to sit in any national Commonwealth Parliament outside Westminster. The influx of women settlers from Britain proved a decisive factor in the 1922 referendum that rejected annexation by a South Africa increasingly under the sway of traditionalist Afrikaner Nationalists in favor of Rhodesian Home Rule or "responsible government". Black Rhodesian males qualified for the vote in 1923 (based only upon property, assets, income, and literacy). It is unclear when the first black woman qualified for the vote.

=== Tunisia ===
Women's suffrage was introduced in Tunisia in 1957.

The context of the introduction of women's suffrage in Tunisia was a part of a big reform program in women's rights. Tunisia became an independent nation in 1956 and saw a number of progressive reforms in favor of women's rights under the Secular President Habib Bourguiba, whose Code of Personal Statue (CSP) replaced the Islamic sharia law with a secular family law: raised the age of marriage, abolished arranged marriages and polygamy and introduced equal divorce law, as well as breaking Islamic sex segregation and encouraged women to appear unveiled. This progressive policy was completed by the introduction of women's suffrage the same year. Women were granted the right to vote in 1957, and became eligible for political office in 1959.

== Asia ==
=== Afghanistan ===
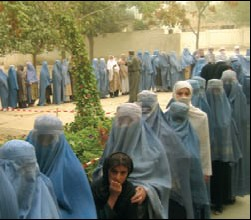
Women voting in Kabul at the first presidential election (October 2004) in Afghan history.

Women were granted suffrage in 1919 but elections were abolished in 1929. Women were again granted suffrage in 1964, and have been able to vote in Afghanistan since 1965 (except during Taliban rule, 1996–2001 and since 2021, under which no elections have been held). As of 2009, women have been casting fewer ballots in part due to being unaware of their voting rights. In the 2014 election, Afghanistan's elected president pledged to bring women equal rights.

In early 2021, there were 69 women elected as members of parliament in Afghanistan; however, after the Fall of Kabul in late 2021, 60 of them fled the country. Legally, women are allowed to vote. However, there have been no government elections in the country since 2021, and all political parties have been banned since 2023.

=== Bahrain ===
The Bahrain formally introduced women's suffrage in 2002, when Article 1, Paragraph E, of the Constitution of the Kingdom of Bahrain, explicitly included women in the citizens eligible to vote.

=== Bangladesh ===
Bangladesh was (mostly) the province of Bengal in British India until 1947 when it became part of Pakistan. It became an independent nation in 1971. Women have had equal suffrage since 1947, and they have reserved seats in parliament. Bangladesh is notable in that since 1991, two women, namely Sheikh Hasina and Begum Khaleda Zia, have served terms as the country's Prime Minister continuously. Women have traditionally played a minimal role in politics beyond the anomaly of the two leaders; few used to run against men; few have been ministers. Recently, however, women have become more active in politics, with several prominent ministerial posts given to women and women participating in national, district and municipal elections against men and winning on several occasions. Choudhury and Hasanuzzaman argue that the strong patriarchal traditions of Bangladesh explain why women are so reluctant to stand up in politics.

=== China ===
The fight for women's suffrage in China was organized when Tang Qunying founded the women's suffrage organization Nüzi chanzheng tongmenghui, to ensure that women's suffrage would be included in the first Constitution drafted after the abolition of the Chinese monarchy in 1911–1912. A short but intense period of campaigning was ended with failure in 1914.

In the following period, local governments in China introduced women's suffrage in their own territories, such as Hunan and Guangdong in 1921 and Sichuan in 1923.

Women's suffrage was included by the Kuomintang Government in the Constitution of 1936, but because of the war, the reform could not be enacted until after the war and was finally introduced in 1947.

=== India ===
Women in India were allowed to vote right from the first general elections after the independence of India in 1947 unlike during the British rule who resisted allowing women to vote. The Women's Indian Association (WIA) was founded in 1917. It sought votes for women and the right to hold legislative office on the same basis as men. These positions were endorsed by the main political groupings, the Indian National Congress. British and Indian feminists combined in 1918 to publish a magazine Stri Dharma that featured international news from a feminist perspective. In 1919 in the Montagu–Chelmsford Reforms, the British set up provincial legislatures which had the power to grant women's suffrage. Madras in 1921 granted votes to wealthy and educated women, under the same terms that applied to men. The other provinces followed, but not the princely states (which did not have votes for men either, being monarchies). In Bengal province, the provincial assembly rejected it in 1921 but Southard shows an intense campaign produced victory in 1921. Success in Bengal depended on middle class Indian women, who emerged from a fast-growing urban elite. The women leaders in Bengal linked their crusade to a moderate nationalist agenda, by showing how they could participate more fully in nation-building by having voting power. They carefully avoided attacking traditional gender roles by arguing that traditions could coexist with political modernization.

Whereas wealthy and educated women in Madras were granted voting right in 1921, in Punjab the Sikhs granted women equal voting rights in 1925, irrespective of their educational qualifications or being wealthy or poor. This happened when the Gurdwara Act of 1925 was approved. The original draft of the Gurdwara Act sent by the British to the Sharomani Gurdwara Prabhandak Committee (SGPC) did not include Sikh women, but the Sikhs inserted the clause without the women having to ask for it. Equality of women with men is enshrined in the Guru Granth Sahib, the sacred scripture of the Sikh faith.

In the Government of India Act 1935 the British Raj set up a system of separate electorates and separate seats for women. Most women's leaders opposed segregated electorates and demanded adult franchise. In 1931 the Congress promised universal adult franchise when it came to power. It enacted equal voting rights for both men and women in 1947.

=== Indonesia ===
Indonesia granted women voting rights for municipal councils in 1905. Only men who could read and write could vote, which excluded many non-European males. At the time, the literacy rate for males was 11% and for females 2%. The main group that pressed for women's suffrage in Indonesia was the Dutch Vereeninging voor Vrouwenkiesrecht (VVV-Women's Suffrage Association), founded in the Netherlands in 1894. VVV tried to attract Indonesian members, but had very limited success because the leaders of the organization had little skill in relating to even the educated class of Indonesians. When they eventually did connect somewhat with women, they failed to sympathize with them and ended up alienating many well-educated Indonesians. In 1918, the first national representative body, the Volksraad, was formed which still excluded women from voting. Indigenous women did not organize until the Perikatan Perempuan Indonesia (PPI, Indonesian Women Association) in 1928. In 1935, the colonial administration used its power of nomination to appoint a European woman to the Volksraad. In 1938, women gained the right to be elected to urban representative institutions, which led to some Indonesian and European women entering municipal councils. Eventually, only European women and municipal councils could vote, excluding all other women and local councils. In September 1941, the Volksraad extended the vote to women of all races. Finally, in November 1941, the right to vote for municipal councils was granted to all women on a similar basis to men (subject to property and educational qualifications).

=== Iran ===
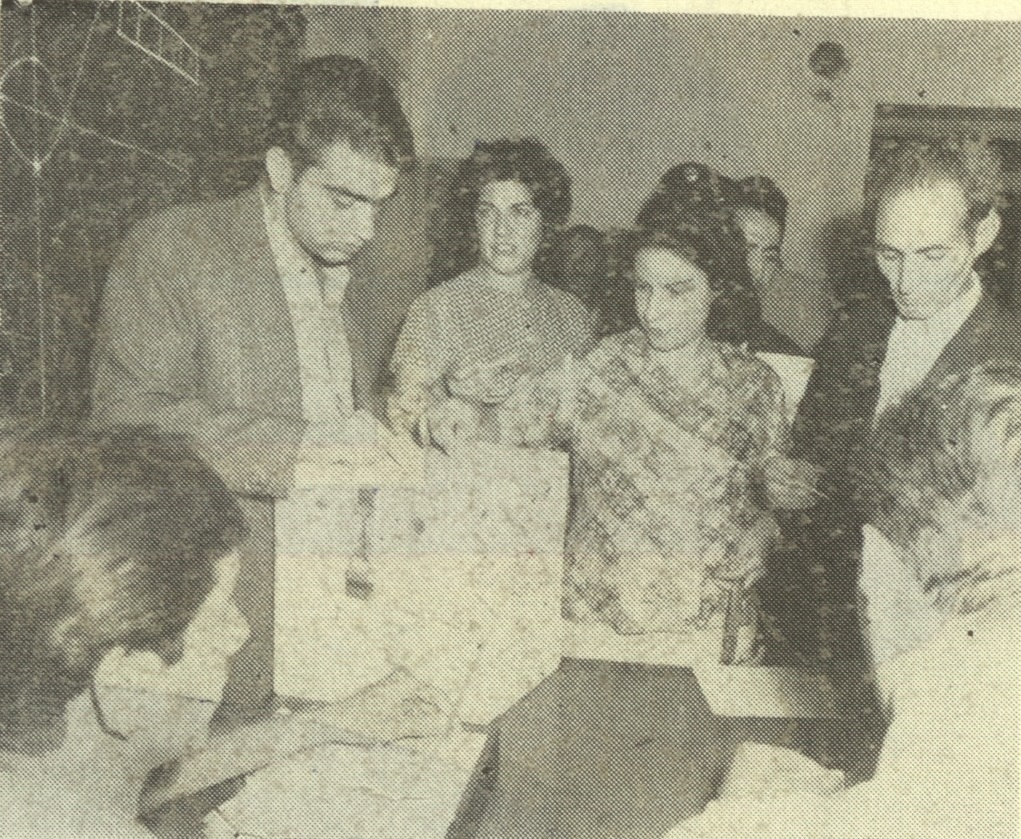
1963 Iranian legislative election

Women's suffrage had been expressly excluded in the Iranian Constitution of 1906 and a women's rights movement had been organized, which supported women's suffrage.

In 1942, the Women's party of Iran (Ḥezb-e zanān-e Īrān) was founded to work to introduce the reform, and in 1944, the women's group of the Tudeh Party of Iran, the Democratic Organization of Iranian Women (Jāmeʿa-ye demokrāt-e zanān) put forward a suggestion of women's suffrage in the Parliament, which was however blocked by the Islamic conservatives. In 1956, a new campaign for women's suffrage was launched by the New Path Society (Jamʿīyat-e rāh-e now), the Association of Women Lawyers (Anjoman-e zanān-e ḥoqūqdān) and the League of Women Supporters of Human Rights (Jamʿīyat-e zanān-e ṭarafdār-e ḥoqūq-e bašar).

After this, the reform was actively supported by the Shah and included as a part of his modernization program, the White Revolution. A referendum in January 1963 overwhelmingly approved by voters gave women the right to vote, a right previously denied to them under the Iranian Constitution of 1906 pursuant to Chapter 2, Article 3.

=== Iraq ===
Full women's suffrage was introduced in Iraq in 1980.

The campaign for women's suffrage started in the 1920s. The women's movement in Iraq organized in 1923 with the Nahda al-Nisa (Women's Awakening Club), led by Asma al-Zahawi and with elite women such as Naima a-Said, and Fakhriyya al-Askari among their members. King Faysal himself had supported women's suffrage during his prior short tenure as king in Syria. Feminists such as Mary Wazir and Paulina Hasun raised the issue in the 1920s. Paulina Hassan published the first Iraqi women's magazine, Layla, in 1923–1925, followed by a number of women's magazines in the 1930s and 1940s that voiced feminist demands. When the Constituent Assembly of Iraq was inaugurated in 1924, Paulina Hassun appealed to the Assembly that women should not be excluded from political participation in the new nation, and one of the members, Amjad al-Umari, unsuccessfully proposed that the word "male" be erased from the Electoral Law to include women in it.

The Women's suffrage reform was primarily supported by the opposition parties, notably the Iraq Communist Party. During the 1930s, the Communist ICP and the leftist al-Ahali supported women's suffrage. Even those supporting the reform, however, often did so with the reservation that woman should reach a higher level of education before they were ready for it.

The Iraqi monarchy prioritized foreign policy rather than internal issues and showed little enthusiasm to address the issue of women's suffrage. The monarchy was careful to avoid alienating conservative and religious circles, who considered women's suffrage as incompatible with the "nature" of women, the proper social order and gender hierarchies, and women's suffrage was not given refused serious consideration. Both the Sunni and Shia clergy rejected women's suffrage as being in opposition to the natural roles of gender, as the "joke of the day", an attack on the law of nature and the proper way of life, since women were the weaker sex and "lesser persons" similar to children. When women's suffrage in Syria was introduced in 1949, MP Farhan al-Irs of al-Amara commented: "Women are shameful. How could they possibly sit with men?"

In 1951 a motion to include women in the Electoral Law was rejected in the Chamber of Deputies. During the discussion to change the electoral law to include women's suffrage in March–April 1951, the MP Abd al-Abbas of Diwaniyya opposed suffrage as this would contradict Islamic sex segregation, as elected women MP would then sit among male MPs in the Chamber of Deputies: "Is this not forbidden? Are we not all of Islam?"

An electoral decree in December 1952 provided direct elections but did not include women. A Sunni scholar published an article in the paper al-Sijill in October 1952 named "The Crime of Equality Between Men and Women": as an imam and khatib of the mosques of Baghdad and scholar of the al-Azhar University, he stated that women's suffrage was a plot against Islam and contrary to Quranic verses which delineated gender hierarchies that made women in politics incompatible.

A number of women's organization was founded in the 1940s and 1950s that campaigned for women's rights including suffrage, notably the Iraqi Union for Women's Rights (1952). Naziha al-Dulaimi of the League for Defence of Women's Rights (Iraqi Women's League), which gathered 42,000 members, campaigned for gender equality (including suffrage), organized educational programs, provided social services, established 78 literacy centers, and drafted the 1959 Personal Status Law, which was accepted and introduced by the Government. In the 1950s the Iraqi Women's Union petitioned senior state figures including the prime minister and wrote articles in the press.

A Week of Women's Rights was launched in October 1953 by Iraqi Women's Union suffrage, who arranged a sumposium and voiced their demand in radio programs and articles in the press to campaigned for women's suffrage. As a response, the Islamic clergy launched a Week of Virtue and called for a general strike against women's suffrage and called for women to "stay at home" since women's suffrage was against Islam. During the Week of Virtue, the Sunni Nihal al-Zahawi, daughter of Amjad al-Zahawi, head of the Muslim Sisters Society (Jamiyyat al-Aukht al-Muslima), spoke on the radio against women's suffrage: she described the suffragists as women who revolted against the very Islam that gave them rights, and that women's suffrage was lamentable since it broke sex segregation and resulted in gender mixing, which was an unrestricted liberty that broke the rules of against Islam.

A breakthrough came in 1958. During the Arab Union of Iraq-Jordan, the Iraqi Constitution was set, in March 1958, to be amended to include women's suffrage later that year, but the matter became moot when the monarchy was abolished in July that year. An unnamed MP to the newspaper al-Hawadith that he could never run against a female candidate, since if he lost he would have lost to a woman, which would have been dishonorable, and if he won, he would only have won over a woman; he claimed many male MPs felt the same, and that voters would also feel dishonored by being represented and ruled by a woman.

The MP Tawfq al-Mukhtar commented to a reporter: "Friends, women's rights bother me a lot, and anybody who condemns or criticizes them gives me great pleasure"; he added that he would withdraw if he was put against a female candidate, and he was one of four MPs to vote against the proposed amendment of March 1958.

In 1958 the Iraqi Monarchy was replaced by the Baathis regime. The early Baathist regime saw women's emancipation in many aspects, with urban liberal modernist women enjoying professional and educational equality and appearing unveiled. The Baathist Party supported women's rights by principle, though it initially focused in expanding women's educational and professional rights rather than their political rights. Article 19 of the Iraqi Provisional Constitution of 1970 granted all Iraqi citizens equal before the law regardless of sex, blood, language, social origin or religion, and the state women's umbrella organization General Foundation of Iraqi Women (GFIW) of 1972 guaranteed women's full equal rights in the professional and educational sphere, prevented all discrimination and recognized women's political participation in principle. However, while women's rights progressed in other aspects, the political rights was delayed. The regime was unstable and saw four regime changes in the 1960s.

In 1980 full suffrage was granted and women were given the right to vote and be elected to political office. The suffrage reform was granted when the new Iraq National Assembly was formed before the 1980s Elections, and 16 of 250 seats where filled by women.

=== Israel ===
Women have had full suffrage since the establishment of the State of Israel in 1948.

In 1920, the Union of Hebrew Women for Equal Rights in Erez Israel launched a campaign that women's suffrage and equal rights for women should be included in the Jewish Authority of the British Palestina Mandate; in 1926, the Jewish Authority granted women's suffrage to the Jewish Authority, and declared that women would be given equal right to vote in the future Jewish State, a promise that was fulfilled upon the foundation of Israel in 1947, followed by equal rights being included in the Constitution of 1951.

The first (and only) woman to be elected Prime Minister of Israel was Golda Meir in 1969.

=== Japan ===
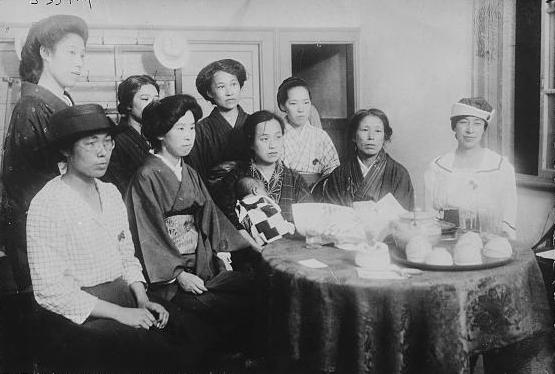
Women's Rights meeting in Tokyo, to push for women's suffrage

Although women were allowed to vote in some prefectures in 1880, women's suffrage was enacted at a national level in 1945 with the end of the world war.

The campaign for women's suffrage started in 1923, when the women's umbrella organization Tokyo Rengo Fujinkai was founded and created several sub groups to address different women's issues, one of whom, Fusen Kakutoku Domei (FKD), was to work for the introduction of women's suffrage and political rights. The campaign was gradually reduced due to difficulties in the 1930s fascist era; the FKD was banned after the outbreak of the Second Sino-Japanese war, and women's suffrage could not be introduced until it was incorporated in the new constitution after the war.

=== Jordan ===
The Arab Women's Federation under Emily Bisharat worked for the introduction of women's suffrage in Jordan in the 1950s.

Suffrage were given to educated women in 1955, but the Federation continued to campaign for universal suffrage for women, collecting the thumb prints as signatures from illiterate women in support for women's suffrage. Universal women's suffrage was finally granted in 1974. However, since no elections was held in Jordan until 1989, women's suffrage was not enforced until that year.

=== Korea ===
South Korean people, including South Korean women, were universally granted the vote in 1948.

=== Kuwait ===
When voting was first introduced in Kuwait in 1985, Kuwaiti women had the right to vote. The right was later removed. In May 2005, the Kuwaiti parliament re-granted female suffrage.

=== Lebanon ===
The women's movement organized in Lebanon with the creation of the Syrian-Lebanese Women's Union in 1924; it split into the Women's Union under Ibtihaj Qaddoura and the Lebanese Women Solidarity Association under Laure Thabet in 1946. The women's movement united again when the two biggest women's organizations, the Lebanese Women's Union and the Christian Women's Solidarity Association created the Lebanese Council of Women in 1952 to campaign for women's suffrage, a task that finally succeeded, after an intense campaign.

=== Oman ===
After the 1970 Omani coup d'état, women's position in society was being reassessed in connection to the national modernization program, and many reforms in women's rights was introduced alongside the establishment of the state feminist Omani Women's Association.

The modernization in women's rights in Oman was followed by municipal suffrage in Muscat in 1994 (with the first two women elected to the local Shura the same year), municipal suffrage in all Oman in 1996, and national suffrage in 2002.

=== Pakistan ===
The provinces that now constitute Pakistan were a part of northwest British India until 1947, when the partition of India occurred. Women received full suffrage in 1947. Muslim women leaders from all classes actively supported the Pakistan movement in the mid-1940s. Their movement was led by wives and other relatives of leading politicians. Women were sometimes organized into large-scale public demonstrations. In November 1988, Benazir Bhutto became the first Muslim woman to be elected as prime minister of a Muslim country.

=== Philippines ===
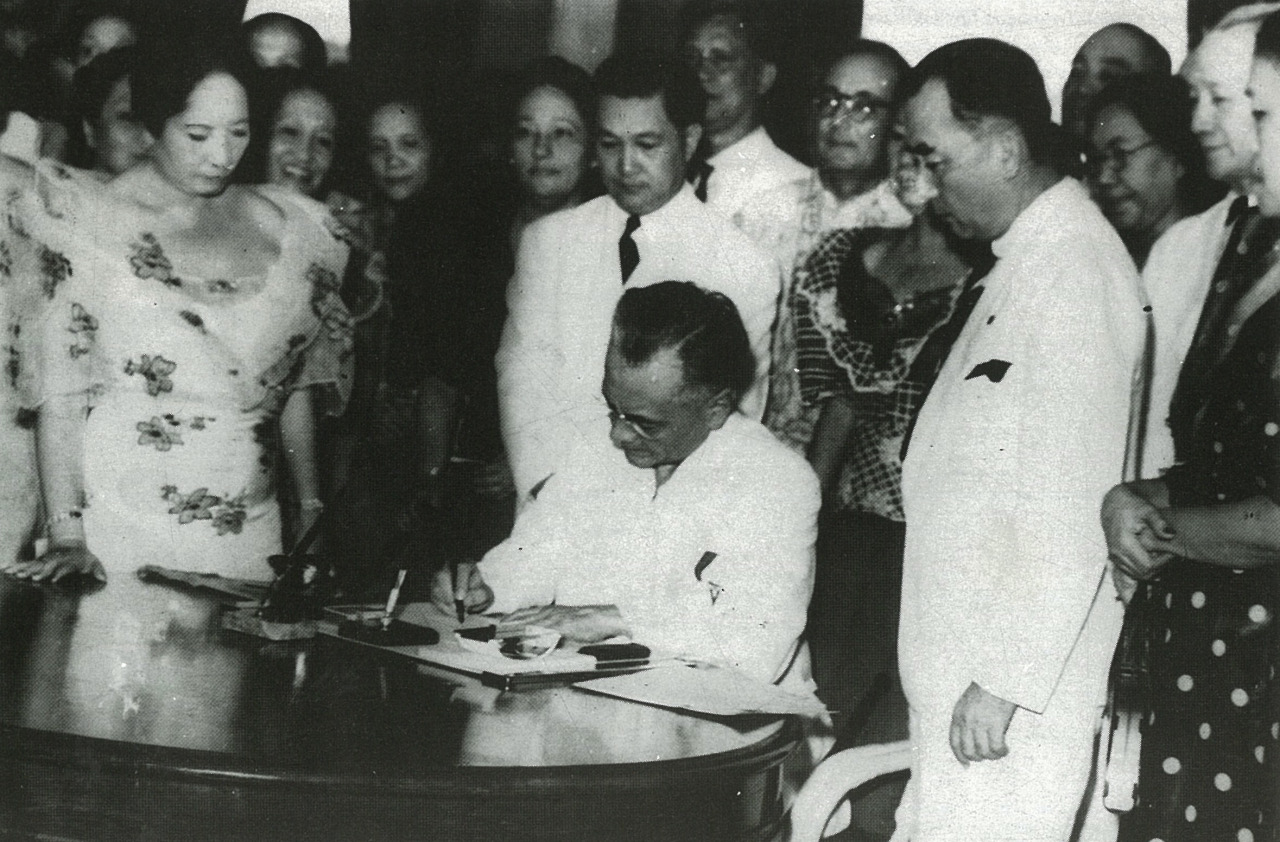
Philippine President Manuel L. Quezon signing the Women's Suffrage Bill following the 1937 plebiscite.

The Philippines was one of the first countries in Asia to grant women the right to vote. The women's movement organized in the early 20th-century in organizations such as the Asociacion Feminista Filipina (1904) the Society for the Advancement of Women (SAW) and the Asociaction Feminist Ilonga, who campaigned for women's suffrage and other rights for gender equality.

Suffrage for Filipinas was achieved following an all-female, special plebiscite held on April 30, 1937. 447,725 – some ninety percent – voted in favour of women's suffrage against 44,307 who voted no. In compliance with the 1935 Constitution, the National Assembly passed a law which extended the right of suffrage to women, which remains to this day.

=== Qatar ===
Qatar formally introduced women's suffrage in 1997.

=== Saudi Arabia ===
In late September 2011, King Abdullah bin Abdulaziz al-Saud declared that women would be able to vote and run for office starting in 2015. That applies to the municipal councils, which are the kingdom's only semi-elected bodies. Half of the seats on municipal councils are elective, and the councils have few powers. The council elections have been held since 2005 (the first time they were held before that was the 1960s). Saudi women did first vote and first run for office in December 2015, for those councils. Salma bint Hizab al-Oteibi became the first elected female politician in Saudi Arabia in December 2015, when she won a seat on the council in Madrakah in Mecca province. In all, the December 2015 election in Saudi Arabia resulted in twenty women being elected to municipal councils.

The king declared in 2011 that women would be eligible to be appointed to the Shura Council, an unelected body that issues advisory opinions on national policy. '"This is great news," said Saudi writer and women's rights activist Wajeha al-Huwaider. "Women's voices will finally be heard. Now it is time to remove other barriers like not allowing women to drive cars and not being able to function, to live a normal life without male guardians."' Robert Lacey, author of two books about the kingdom, said, "This is the first positive, progressive speech out of the government since the Arab Spring.... First the warnings, then the payments, now the beginnings of solid reform." The king made the announcement in a five-minute speech to the Shura Council. In January 2013, King Abdullah issued two royal decrees, granting women thirty seats on the council, and stating that women must always hold at least a fifth of the seats on the council. According to the decrees, the female council members must be "committed to Islamic Shariah disciplines without any violations" and be "restrained by the religious veil". The decrees also said that the female council members would be entering the council building from special gates, sit in seats reserved for women and pray in special worshipping places. Earlier, officials said that a screen would separate genders and an internal communications network would allow men and women to communicate. Women first joined the council in 2013, holding a total of thirty seats. There are two Saudi royal women among these thirty female members of the assembly, Sara bint Faisal Al Saud and Moudi bint Khalid Al Saud. Furthermore, in 2013 three women were named as deputy chairpersons of three committees: Thurayya Obeid was named deputy chairwoman of the human rights and petitions committee, Zainab Abu Talib, deputy chairwoman of the information and cultural committee, and Lubna Al Ansari, deputy chairwoman of the health affairs and environment committee.

=== Syria ===
Women's suffrage was introduced in Syria in 1953.

While the women's suffrage reform was supported by the women's magazine Nur al-Faya of Nazik al-Abid and al-Arus of Mary Ajami, there was no organized suffrage movement in Syria, and the majority was convinced that women preserved their virtue by staying away from politics.

In 1920, the feminist Mary Ajami presented a petition to the Syrian Congress of 1920 during the Faisal-Government, but the subject was postphoned and forgotten after the fall of the Faisal regime. When the petition of women's suffrage was discussed in the Syrian Congress in 1920, Shaykh Abd al-Qadir al-Kaylani stated that to given women the right to vote would be the same thing as abolish sex segregation and allow women to appear unveiled.

In the 1930s and 1940s, the Arab Women's Union of Damascus presented a women's suffrage petition to President Hashim al-Atassi and to President Shukri al-Quwatli, as well as directly to the Parliament. When the influential feminist Adila Bayhum gave her support to Husni al-Za'im, he promised her to introduce women's suffrage when he came to power in 1949, and the reform was finally introduced in 1953.

=== Sri Lanka ===
In 1931, Sri Lanka (at that time Ceylon) became one of the first Asian countries to allow voting rights to women over the age of 21 without any restrictions. Since then, women have enjoyed a significant presence in the Sri Lankan political arena.

The women's movement organized on Sri Lanka under the Ceylon Women's Union in 1904, and from 1925, the Mallika Kulangana Samitiya and then the Women's Franchise Union (WFU) campaigned successfully for the introduction of women's suffrage, which was achieved in 1931.

The zenith of this favourable condition to women has been the 1960 July General Elections, in which Ceylon elected the world's first female prime minister, Sirimavo Bandaranaike. She became the world's first democratically elected female head of government. Her daughter, Chandrika Kumaratunga also became the Prime Minister later in 1994, and the same year she was elected as the Executive president of Sri Lanka, making her the fourth woman in the world to be elected president, and the first female executive president.

=== Thailand ===
The Ministry of Interior's Local Administrative Act of May 1897 (Phraraachabanyat 1897 [BE 2440]) granted municipal suffrage in the election of village leader to all villagers "whose house or houseboat was located in that village," and explicitly included women voters who met the qualifications. This was a part of the far-reaching administrative reforms enacted by King Chulalongkorn (r. 1868–1919), in his efforts to protect Thai sovereignty.

In the new constitution introduced after the Siamese revolution of 1932, which transformed Siam from an absolute monarchy to a parliamentary constitutional monarchy, women were granted the right to vote and run for office. This reform was enacted without any prior activism in favor of women's suffrage and was followed by a number of reforms in women's rights, and it has been suggested that the reform was part of an effort by Pridi Bhanomyong to put Thailand on equal political terms with modern Western powers and establish diplomatic recognition by those as a modern nation. The new right was used for the first time in 1933, and the first female MPs were elected in 1949.

=== United Arab Emirates ===
The United Arab Emirates formally introduced women's suffrage in 2006.

=== Yemen ===
Historically Yemen was divided in two nations prior to its unification in 1990, both of whom already had women's suffrage prior to the unification. The history of women's suffrage is therefore split.

Women's suffrage was granted in South Yemen in 1967. The reform was a part of a number of reforms introduced in women's rights under Socialist rule. When the People's Democratic Republic of Yemen was founded as an independent nation under the Socialist NLF Party in 1967, the General Union of Yemeni Women was founded as a part of the regime's policy. The purpose of the GUYW was to enforce the official women's policy of the People's Democratic Republic regime, which was a radical and ambitions state feminism.

Women's suffrage was granted in North Yemen in 1970. The Northern Yemen Arab Republic was a deeply conservative state with sharia law and no strong women's movement, were no reforms in women's rights were not prioritised during the Yemen civil war of 1962–1970. However, the Second Permanent Constitution of 1970 stated that "all citizens are equal before the law"; and while this phrase did not explicitly include women, women voters used this phrase to vote in the next election, which was held in 1983.

== Europe ==
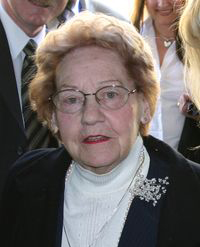
Savka Dabčević-Kučar, Croatian Spring participant; Europe's first female prime minister

In Europe, the first two countries to enact women's suffrage were Finland in 1906 and Denmark in 1913, and the last two were Switzerland and Liechtenstein. In Switzerland, women gained the right to vote in federal elections in 1971; but in the canton of Appenzell Innerrhoden women obtained the right to vote on local issues only in 1991, when the canton was forced to do so by the Federal Supreme Court of Switzerland. In Liechtenstein, women were given the right to vote by the women's suffrage referendum of 1984. Three prior referendums held in 1968, 1971 and 1973 had failed to secure women's right to vote.

=== Albania ===
Albania introduced a limited and conditional form of women's suffrage in 1920, and subsequently provided full voting rights in 1945.

=== Andorra ===
The Principality of Andorra introduced women's suffrage in 1970 (third last in Europe), though Andorra did not have a democratic constitution until 1993.

In 1969, 3708 signatures demanding women's suffrage and eligibility was presented to the Andorra Council Parliament. In April 1970, women's suffrage was introduced after a vote with 10 votes for and eight against, while however eligibility was voted down. Women's eligibility was introduced on 5 September 1973. The first woman became MP in 1984.

=== Austria ===
After the breakdown of the Habsburg monarchy in 1918, Austria granted the general, equal, direct and secret right to vote to all citizens, regardless of sex, through the change of the electoral code in December 1918. The first elections in which women participated were the February 1919 Constituent Assembly elections.

=== Azerbaijan ===
Universal voting rights were recognized in Azerbaijan in 1918 by the Azerbaijan Democratic Republic. Thus, making Azerbaijan the first Muslim-majority country to enfranchise women. This early commitment to women's rights was part of a broader movement towards secularization and modernization in the country.

=== Belgium ===
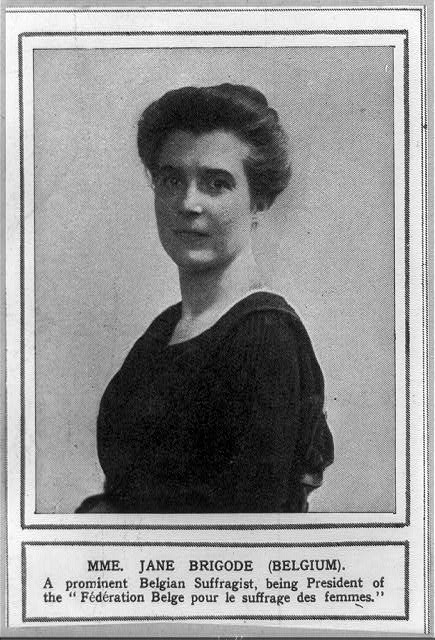
Jane Brigode, Belgian suffragist, c. 1910

A revision of the constitution in October 1921 (it changed art. 47 of the Constitution of Belgium of 1831) introduced the general right to vote according to the "one man, one vote" principle. Art. 47 allowed widows of World War I to vote at the national level as well. The introduction of women's suffrage was already put onto the agenda at the time, by means of including an article in the constitution that allowed approval of women's suffrage by special law (meaning it needed a 2/3 majority to pass). Belgian socialists opposed the women's suffrage, fearing their conservative leanings and their "domination" by the clergy. This happened on March 27, 1948. In Belgium, voting is compulsory.

=== Bulgaria ===
Bulgaria left Ottoman rule in 1878. Although the first adopted constitution, the Tarnovo Constitution (1879), gave women equal election rights, in fact women were disenfranchised, not allowed to vote and to be elected. The Bulgarian Women's Union was an umbrella organization of the 27 local women's organisations that had been established in Bulgaria since 1878. It was founded as a reply to the limitations of women's education and access to university studies in the 1890s, with the goal to further women's intellectual development and participation, arranged national congresses and used Zhenski glas as its organ. However, they had limited success.

In 1937 married women received right to vote at the local ecections. In 1938 all women above 21 years received that right for parliamentary elections, but they still could not be elected neither as MPs nor as local councelors. It was only after the Second World War that women received the right to be elected, and in 1945 the first 16 female MPs were elected in the National Assembly.

=== Czech Republic ===
In the former Bohemia, taxpaying women and women in "learned profession[s]" were allowed to vote by proxy and made eligible to the legislative body in 1864. The first Czech female MP was elected to the Diet of Bohemia in 1912. The Declaration of Independence of the Czechoslovak Nation from October 18, 1918, declared that "our democracy shall rest on universal suffrage. Women shall be placed on equal footing with men, politically, socially, and culturally," and women were appointed to the Revolutionary National Assembly (parliament) on November 13, 1918. On June 15, 1919, women voted in local elections for the first time. Women were guaranteed equal voting rights by the constitution of the Czechoslovak Republic in February 1920 and were able to vote for the parliament for the first time in April 1920.

=== Cyprus ===
Cyprus had no organized women's movement until the mid-20th century and no activism in favor of women's suffrage, which was introduced in the new constitution of 1961 after the liberation from Britain, simply because women's suffrage had at that point came to be regarded as a given thing in international democratic standard.

=== Denmark ===
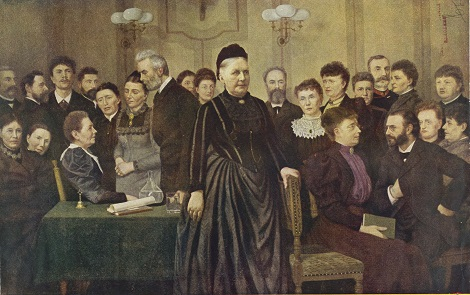
Line luplau seen in the foreground on her daughter Marie Luplau's large group portrait painting From the Early Days of the Fight for Women's Suffrage (1897)

In Denmark, the Danish Women's Society (DK) debated, and informally supported, women's suffrage from 1884, but it did not support it publicly until in 1887, when it supported the suggestion of the parliamentarian Fredrik Bajer to grant women municipal suffrage. In 1886, in response to the perceived overcautious attitude of DK in the question of women suffrage, Matilde Bajer founded the Kvindelig Fremskridtsforening (or KF, 1886–1904) to deal exclusively with the right to suffrage, both in municipal and national elections, and it 1887, the Danish women publicly demanded the right for women's suffrage for the first time through the KF. However, as the KF was very much involved with worker's rights and pacifist activity, the question of women's suffrage was in fact not given full attention, which led to the establishment of the strictly women's suffrage movement Kvindevalgretsforeningen (1889–1897). In 1890, the KF and the Kvindevalgretsforeningen united with five women's trade worker's unions to found the De samlede Kvindeforeninger, and through this form, an active women's suffrage campaign was arranged through agitation and demonstration. However, after having been met by compact resistance, the Danish suffrage movement almost discontinued with the dissolution of the De samlede Kvindeforeninger in 1893.

In 1898, an umbrella organization, the Danske Kvindeforeningers Valgretsforbund or DKV was founded and became a part of the International Woman Suffrage Alliance (IWSA). In 1907, the Landsforbundet for Kvinders Valgret (LKV) was founded by Elna Munch, Johanne Rambusch and Marie Hjelmer in reply to what they considered to be the much too careful attitude of the Danish Women's Society. The LKV originated from a local suffrage association in Copenhagen, and like its rival DKV, it successfully organized other such local associations nationally.

Women won the right to vote in municipal elections on April 20, 1908. However it was not until June 5, 1915 that they were allowed to vote in Rigsdag elections.

=== Estonia ===
Estonia gained its independence in 1918 with the Estonian War of Independence. However, the first official elections were held in 1917. These were the elections of temporary council (i.e. Maapäev), which ruled Estonia from 1917 to 1919. Since then, women have had the right to vote.

The parliament elections were held in 1920. After the elections, two women got into the parliament – history teacher Emma Asson and journalist Alma Ostra-Oinas. Estonian parliament is called Riigikogu and during the interwar period it used to have 100 seats.

=== Finland ===
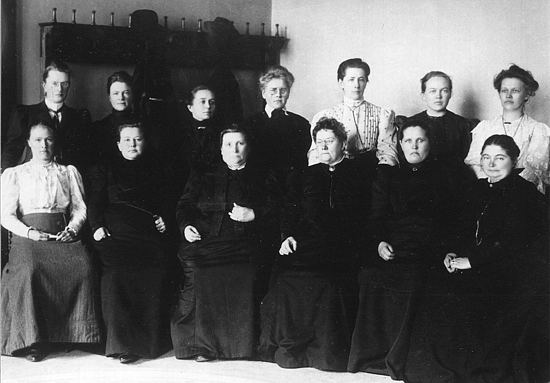
13 of the total of 19 female MPs, who were the first female MPs in the world, elected in Finland's parliamentary elections in 1907

The area that in 1809 became Finland had been a group of integral provinces of the Kingdom of Sweden for over 600 years. Thus, women in Finland were allowed to vote during the Swedish Age of Liberty (1718–1772), during which conditional suffrage was granted to tax-paying female members of guilds. However, this right was controversial. In Vaasa, there was opposition against women participating in the town hall discussing political issues, as this was not seen as their right place, and women's suffrage appears to have been opposed in practice in some parts of the realm: when Anna Elisabeth Baer and two other women petitioned to vote in Turku in 1771, they were not allowed to do so by town officials.

The predecessor state of modern Finland, the Grand Duchy of Finland, was part of the Russian Empire from 1809 to 1917 and enjoyed a high degree of autonomy. In 1863, taxpaying women were granted municipal suffrage in the countryside, and in 1872, the same reform was implemented in the cities. The issue of women's suffrage was first raised by the women's movement when it organized in the Finnish Women's Association (1884), and the first organization exclusively devoted to the issue of suffrage was Naisasialiitto Unioni (1892).

In 1906, Finland became the first province in the world to implement racially-equal women's suffrage, unlike Australia in 1902. Finland also elected the world's first female members of parliament the following year. In 1907, the first general election in Finland that had been open to women took place. Nineteen women were elected which was less than 10% of the total members of parliament. The successful women included Lucina Hagman, Miina Sillanpää, Anni Huotari, Hilja Pärssinen, Hedvig Gebhard, Ida Aalle, Mimmi Kanervo, Eveliina Ala-Kulju, Hilda Käkikoski, Liisi Kivioja, Sandra Lehtinen, Dagmar Neovius, Maria Raunio, Alexandra Gripenberg, Iida Vemmelpuu, Maria Laine, Jenny Nuotio and Hilma Räsänen. Many had expected more. A few women realised that the women of Finland needed to seize this opportunity and organisation and education would be required. Newly elected MPs Lucina Hagman and Maikki Friberg together with Olga Oinola, Aldyth Hultin, Mathilda von Troil, Ellinor Ingman-Ivalo, Sofia Streng and Olga Österberg founded the Finnish Women's Association's first branch in Helsinki. Miina Sillanpää became Finland's first female government minister in 1926.

=== France ===
The April 21, 1944 ordinance of the French Committee of National Liberation, confirmed in October 1944 by the French provisional government, extended the suffrage to French women. The first elections with female participation were the municipal elections of April 29, 1945 and the parliamentary elections of 21 October 1945. "Indigenous Muslim" women in French Algeria also known as Colonial Algeria, had to wait until a July 3, 1958, decree.

Although several countries had started extending suffrage to women from the end of the 19th century, France was one of the last countries to do so in Europe. In fact, the Napoleonic Code declares the legal and political incapacity of women, which blocked attempts to give women political rights. First feminist claims started emerging during the French Revolution in 1789. Condorcet expressed his support for women's right to vote in an article published in Journal de la Société de 1789, but his project failed. On 17 January 1913, Marie Denizard was the first woman to stand as a candidate in a French presidential election but the state refused to acknowledge her. After World War I, French women continued demanding political rights, and despite the Chamber of Deputies being in favor, the Senate continuously refused to analyze the law proposal. Socialists, and more generally, the political left repeatedly opposed the right to vote for women because they feared their more conservative preferences and their "domination" by priests. It was only after World War II that women were granted political rights.

=== Georgia ===
Upon its declaration of independence on May 26, 1918, in the aftermath of the Russian Revolution, the Democratic Republic of Georgia extended suffrage to its female citizens. The women of Georgia first exercised their right to vote in the 1919 legislative election.

=== Germany ===
Women were granted the right to vote and be elected from November 12, 1918. The Weimar Constitution established a "new" Germany after the end of World War I and extended the right to vote to all citizens above the age of 20, with some exceptions.

=== Greece ===
Greece had universal suffrage since its independence in 1832, but this suffrage excluded women. The first proposal to give Greek women the right to vote was made on May 19, 1922, by a member of parliament, supported by then Prime Minister Dimitrios Gounaris, during a constitutional convention. The proposal garnered a narrow majority of those present when it was first proposed, but failed to get the broad 80% support needed to add it to the constitution. In 1925 consultations began again, and a law was passed allowing women the right to vote in local elections, provided they were 30 years of age and had attended at least primary education. The law remained unenforced, until feminist movements within the civil service lobbied the government to enforce it in December 1927 and March 1929. Women were allowed to vote on a local level for the first time in the Piraeus local elections, on December 14, 1930, where 240 women exercised their right to do so. Women's turnout remained low, at only around 15,000 in the national local elections of 1934, despite women being a narrow majority of the population of 6.8 million. Women could not stand for election, despite a proposal made by Interior minister Ioannis Rallis, which was contested in the courts; the courts ruled that the law only gave women "a limited franchise" and struck down any lists where women were listed as candidates for local councils. Misogyny was rampant in that era; the 19th century Greek writer Emmanuel Rhoides wrote that "two professions are fit for women: housewife and courtesan". Another misogynistic "argument" employed against women's right to vote was that "during menstruation women are loony and in a frantic psychological state, and since they may be menstruating at the time of the elections, they can't vote".

On a national level women over 18 voted for the first time in April 1944 for the National Council, a legislative body set up by the National Liberation Front resistance movement. Ultimately, women won the legal right to vote and run for office on May 28, 1952. Eleni Skoura, again from Thessaloniki, became the first woman elected to the Hellenic Parliament in 1953, with the conservative Greek Rally, when she won a by-election against another female opponent. Women were finally able to participate in the 1956 election, with two more women becoming members of parliament; Lina Tsaldari, wife of former Prime Minister Panagis Tsaldaris, won the most votes of any candidate in the country and became the first female minister in Greece under the conservative National Radical Union government of Konstantinos Karamanlis.

No woman has been elected Prime Minister of Greece, but Vassiliki Thanou-Christophilou served as the country's first female prime minister, heading a caretaker government, between August 27 and September 21, 2015. The first woman to lead a major political party was Aleka Papariga, who served as General Secretary of the Communist Party of Greece from 1991 to 2013.

=== Hungary ===
In Hungary, although it was already planned in 1818, the first occasion when women could vote was the elections held in January 1920.

=== Iceland ===
Iceland was under Danish rule until 1944. Icelandic women acquired full voting rights along with Danish women on June 19, 1915.

=== Ireland ===
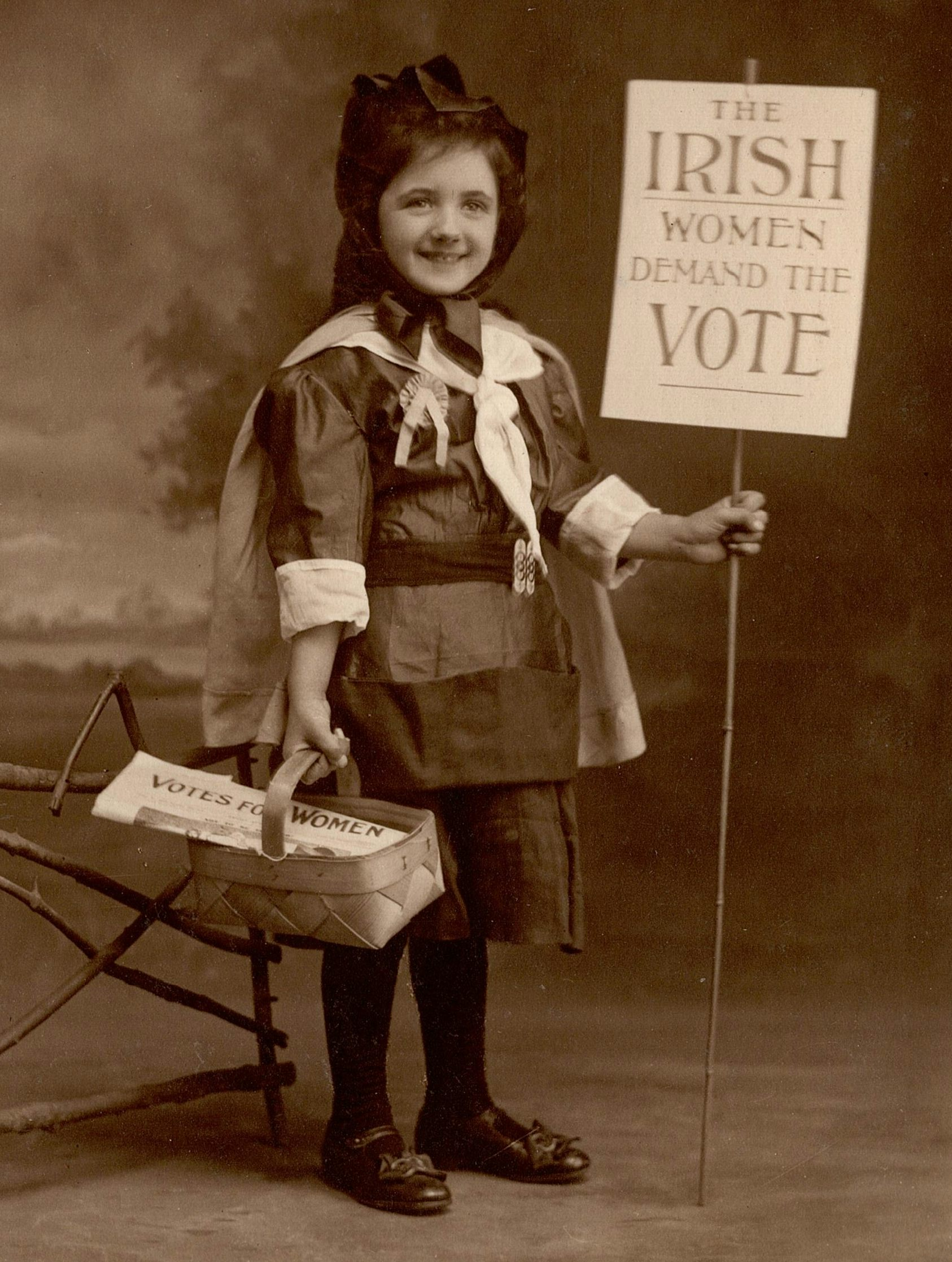

From 1918, with the rest of the United Kingdom, women in Ireland could vote at age 30 with property qualifications or in university constituencies, while men could vote at age 21 with no qualification. From separation in 1922, the Irish Free State gave equal voting rights to men and women. ["All citizens of the Irish Free State (Saorstát Eireann) without distinction of sex, who have reached the age of twenty-one years and who comply with the provisions of the prevailing electoral laws, shall have the right to vote for members of Dáil Eireann, and to take part in the Referendum and Initiative."] Promises of equal rights from the Proclamation were embraced in the Constitution in 1922, the year Irish women achieved full voting rights. However, over the next ten years, laws were introduced that eliminated women's rights from serving on juries, working after marriage, and working in industry. The 1937 Constitution and Taoiseach Éamon de Valera’s conservative leadership further stripped women of their previously granted rights. As well, though the 1937 Constitution guarantees women the right to vote and to nationality and citizenship on an equal basis with men, it also contains a provision, Article 41.2, which states:

1° [...] the State recognises that by her life within the home, woman gives to the State a support without which the common good cannot be achieved. 2° The State shall, therefore, endeavour to ensure that mothers shall not be obliged by economic necessity to engage in labour to the neglect of their duties in the home.

=== Isle of Man ===
In 1881, the Isle of Man (in the British Isles but not part of the United Kingdom) passed a law giving the vote to single and widowed women who passed a property qualification. This was to vote in elections for the House of Keys, in the Island's parliament, Tynwald. This was extended to universal suffrage for men and women in 1919.

=== Italy ===
In Italy, women's suffrage was not introduced following World War I, but upheld by Socialist and Fascist activists and partly introduced on a local or municipal level by Benito Mussolini's government in 1925. In April 1945, the provisional government led by the Italian Resistance decreed the universal enfranchisement of women in Italy, allowing for the immediate appointment of women to public office, of which the first was Elena Fischli Dreher. In the 1946 election, all Italians simultaneously voted for the Constituent Assembly and for a referendum about keeping Italy a monarchy or creating a republic instead. Elections were not held in the Julian March and South Tyrol because they were under Allied occupation.

The new version of article 51 Constitution recognizes equal opportunities in electoral lists.

=== Liechtenstein ===
In Liechtenstein, women's suffrage was granted via referendum in 1984.

=== Luxembourg ===
In Luxembourg, Marguerite Thomas-Clement spoke in favour of women suffrage in public debate through articles in the press in 1917–19; however, there was never any organized women suffrage movement in Luxembourg, as women suffrage was included without debate in the new democratic constitution of 1919.

=== Malta ===
Malta was a British colony, but when women's suffrage was finally introduced in Great Britain in 1918, this had not been included in the 1921 Constitution on Malta, when Malta was given its own parliament, although the Labour Party did support the reform. In 1931, Mabel Strickland, assistant secretary of Constitution Party, delivered a petition signed by 428 to the Royal Commission on Maltese Affairs requesting women's suffrage without success.

However, there had been no organized movement for women's suffrage on Malta. In 1944 the Women of Malta Association was founded by Josephine Burns de Bono and Helen Buhagiar. The purpose was to work for the inclusion of women's suffrage in the new Malta constitution, which was to be introduced in 1947 and which was at that time prepared in parliament. The Women of Malta Association was officially registered as a labor union, to give its representatives the right to speak in parliament. The Catholic church as well as the Nationalist Party opposed women's suffrage with the argument that suffrage would be an unnecessary burden for women who had family and household to occupy them. The Labour Party as well as the labour movement in general supported the reform. An argument was that women paid taxes and should therefore also vote to decide what to do with them. Women's suffrage was approved with the votes 145 to 137. However, this did not include women's right to be elected to political office, and the Women of Malta Association therefore continued the campaign to include also this right. The debate continued with the same supporters and opponents, and the same arguments for and against, until this right was approved as well.

Women's suffrage and right to be elected to political office were included in the MacMichael Constitution, which was finally introduced on September 5, 1947. A politician at the time commented that the reform had been possible only because of women's participation in the war effort during the World War II.

=== Monaco ===
Monaco introduced women's suffrage in 1962, as the fourth last in Europe. In Monaco, Women's suffrage was not introduced after a long campaign – although supported by the Union of Monegasque Women, itself only founded in 1958 – but was introduced as a part of the new Constitution, alongside Parliamentarism, an independent court system and a number of other legal and political reforms.

=== Netherlands ===
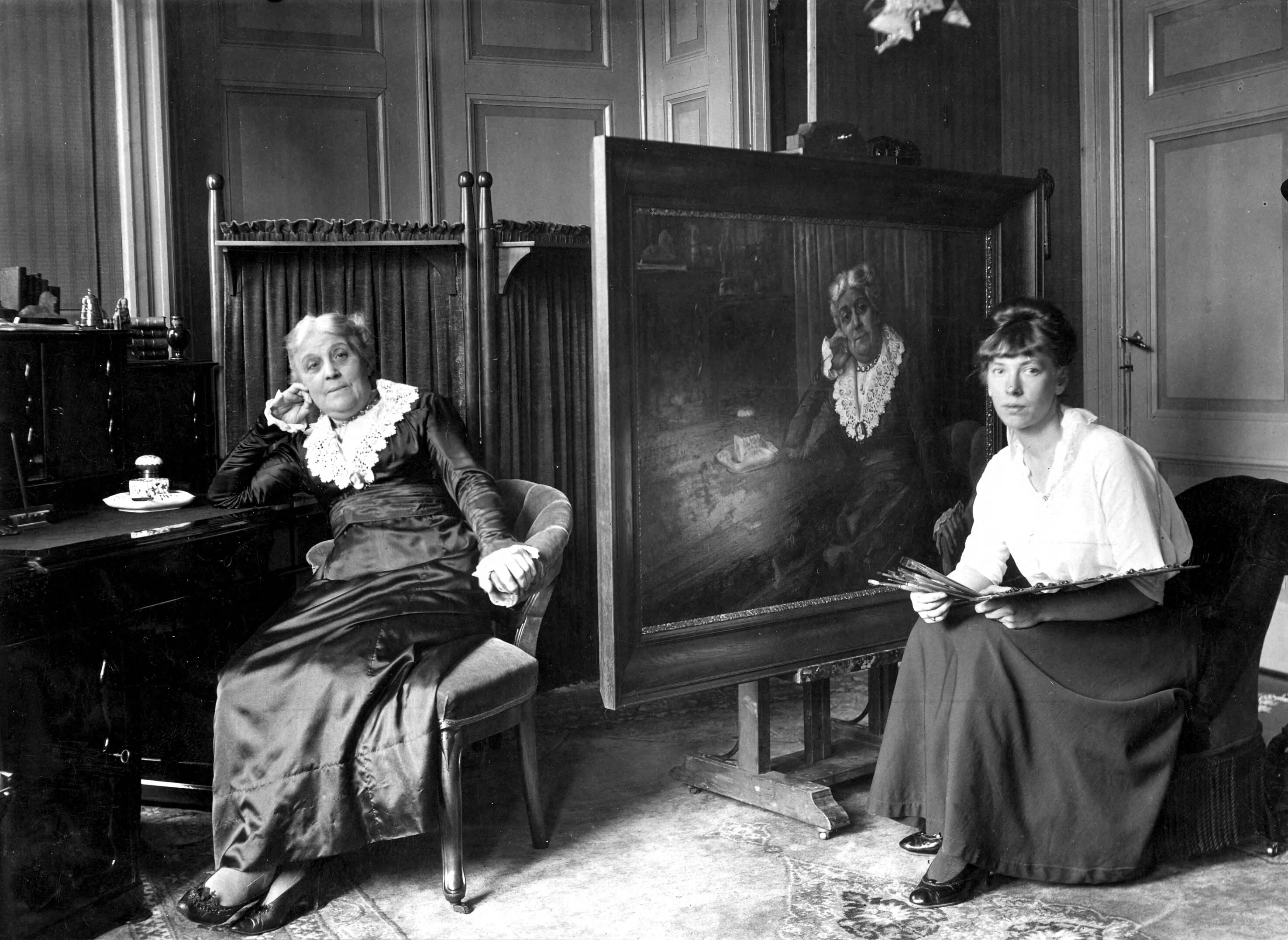
Wilhelmina Drucker, a Dutch pioneer for women's rights, is portrayed by Truus Claes in 1917 on the occasion of her seventieth birthday.

Women were granted the right to vote in the Netherlands on August 9, 1919. In 1917, a constitutional reform already allowed women to be electable. However, even though women's right to vote was approved in 1919, this only took effect from January 1, 1920.

The women's suffrage movement in the Netherlands was led by three women: Aletta Jacobs, Wilhelmina Drucker and Annette Versluys-Poelman. In 1889, Wilhelmina Drucker founded a women's movement called Vrije Vrouwen Vereeniging (Free Women's Union) and it was from this movement that the campaign for women's suffrage in the Netherlands emerged. This movement got a lot of support from other countries, especially from the women's suffrage movement in England. In 1906 the movement wrote an open letter to the Queen pleading for women's suffrage. When this letter was rejected, in spite of popular support, the movement organised several demonstrations and protests in favor of women's suffrage. This movement was of great significance for women's suffrage in the Netherlands.

=== Norway ===
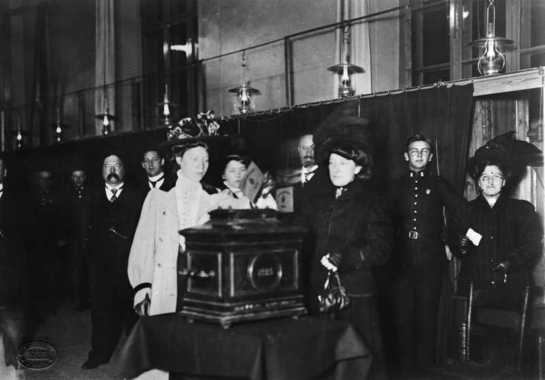
The first Norwegian woman voter casts her ballot in the 1910 municipal election.

Liberal politician Gina Krog was the leading campaigner for women's suffrage in Norway from the 1880s. She founded the Norwegian Association for Women's Rights and the National Association for Women's Suffrage to promote this cause. Members of these organisations were politically well-connected and well organised and in a few years gradually succeeded in obtaining equal rights for women. Middle-class women won the right to vote in municipal elections in 1901 and parliamentary elections in 1907. Universal suffrage for women in municipal elections was introduced in 1910, and in 1913 a motion on universal suffrage for women was adopted unanimously by the Norwegian parliament (Stortinget). Norway thus became the first independent country to introduce women's suffrage.

=== Poland ===
Regaining independence in 1918 following the 123-year period of partition and foreign rule, Poland immediately granted women the right to vote and be elected as of November 28, 1918.

The first women elected to the Sejm in 1919 were: Gabriela Balicka, Jadwiga Dziubińska, Irena Kosmowska, Maria Moczydłowska, Zofia Moraczewska, Anna Piasecka, Zofia Sokolnicka, and Franciszka Wilczkowiakowa.

=== Portugal ===
Carolina Beatriz Ângelo was the first Portuguese woman to vote, in the Constituent National Assembly election of 1911, taking advantage of a loophole in the country's electoral law.

In 1931, during the Estado Novo regime, women were allowed to vote for the first time, but only if they had a high school or university degree, while men had only to be able to read and write. In 1946 a new electoral law enlarged the possibility of female vote, but still with some differences regarding men. A law from 1968 claimed to establish "equality of political rights for men and women", but a few electoral rights were reserved for men. After the Carnation Revolution, women were granted full and equal electoral rights in 1976.

=== Romania ===
The timeline of granting women's suffrage in Romania was gradual and complex, due to the turbulent historical period when it happened. The concept of universal suffrage for all men was introduced in 1918, and reinforced by the 1923 Constitution of Romania. Although this constitution opened the way for the possibility of women's suffrage too (Article 6), this did not materialize: the Electoral Law of 1926 did not grant women the right to vote, maintaining all male suffrage. Starting in 1929, women who met certain qualifications were allowed to vote in local elections. After the Constitution from 1938 (elaborated under Carol II of Romania who sought to implement an authoritarian regime) the voting rights were extended to women for national elections by the Electoral Law 1939, but both women and men had restrictions, and in practice these restrictions affected women more than men (the new restrictions on men also meant that men lost their previous universal suffrage). Although women could vote, they could be elected only to the Senate and not to the Chamber of Deputies (Article 4 (c)). (the Senate was later abolished in 1940). Due to the historical context of the time, which included the dictatorship of Ion Antonescu, there were no elections in Romania between 1940 and 1946. In 1946, Law no. 560 gave full equal rights to men and women to vote and to be elected in the Chamber of Deputies; and women voted in the 1946 Romanian general election. The Constitution of 1948 gave women and men equal civil and political rights (Article 18). Until the collapse of communism in 1989, all the candidates were chosen by the Romanian Communist Party, and civil rights were merely symbolic under this authoritarian regime.

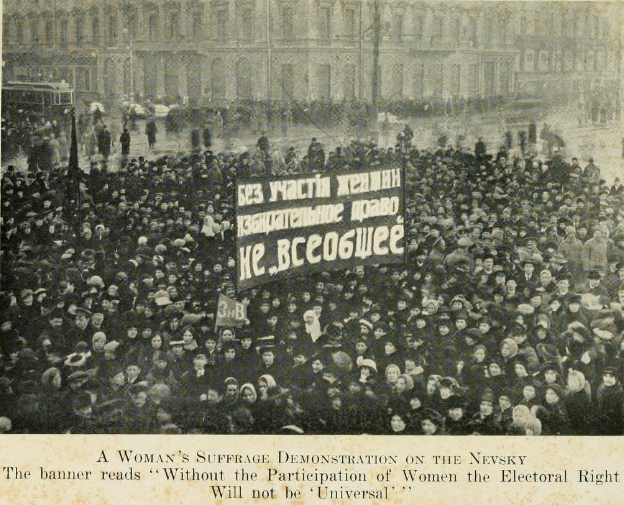
A 1917 demonstration in Petrograd. The plaque says (in Russian): "Without the participation of women, election is not universal!"

=== Russia ===
Despite initial apprehension against enfranchising women for the right to vote for the upcoming Constituent Assembly election, the League for Women's Equality and other suffragists rallied throughout the year of 1917 for the right to vote. After much pressure (including a 40,000-strong march on the Tauride Palace), on July 20, 1917, the Provisional Government enfranchised women with the right to vote.

=== San Marino ===
San Marino introduced women's suffrage in 1959, following the 1957 constitutional crisis known as Fatti di Rovereta. It was however only in 1973 that women obtained the right to stand for election.

=== Spain ===
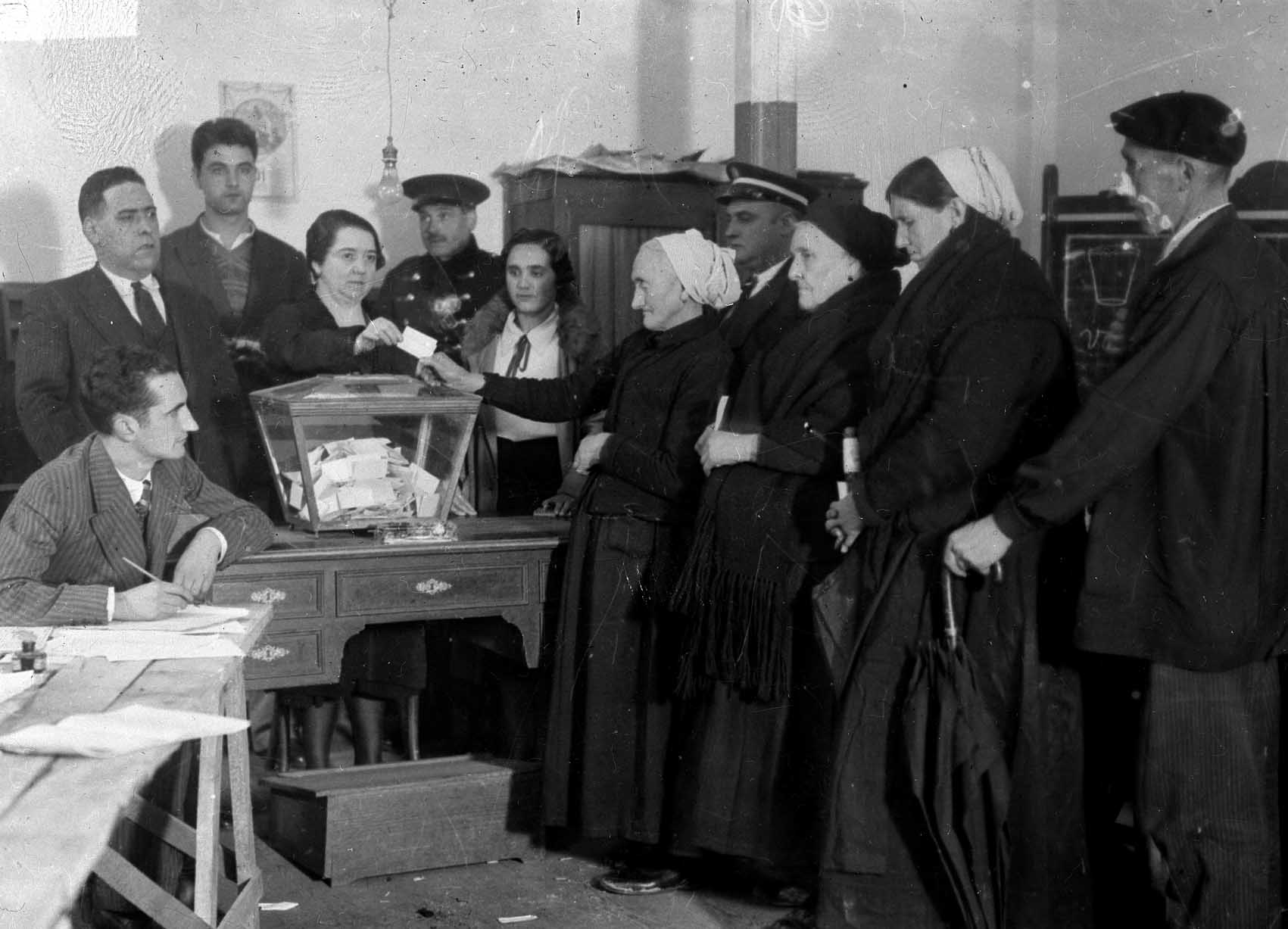
Women exercising the right to vote during the Second Spanish Republic, November 5, 1933

During the Miguel Primo de Rivera regime (1923–1930) only women who were considered heads of household were allowed to vote in local elections, but there were none at that time. Women's suffrage was officially adopted in 1931 despite the opposition of Margarita Nelken and Victoria Kent, two female MPs (both members of the Republican Radical-Socialist Party), who argued that women in Spain at that moment lacked social and political education enough to vote responsibly because they would be unduly influenced by Catholic priests. Most Spanish Republicans at the time held the same view. The other female MP at the time, Clara Campoamor of the liberal Radical Party, was a strong advocate of women's suffrage and she was the one leading the Parliament's affirmative vote. During the Franco regime in the "organic democracy" type of elections called "referendums" (Franco's regime was dictatorial) women over 21 were allowed to vote without distinction. From 1976, during the Spanish transition to democracy women fully exercised the right to vote and be elected to office.

=== Sweden ===
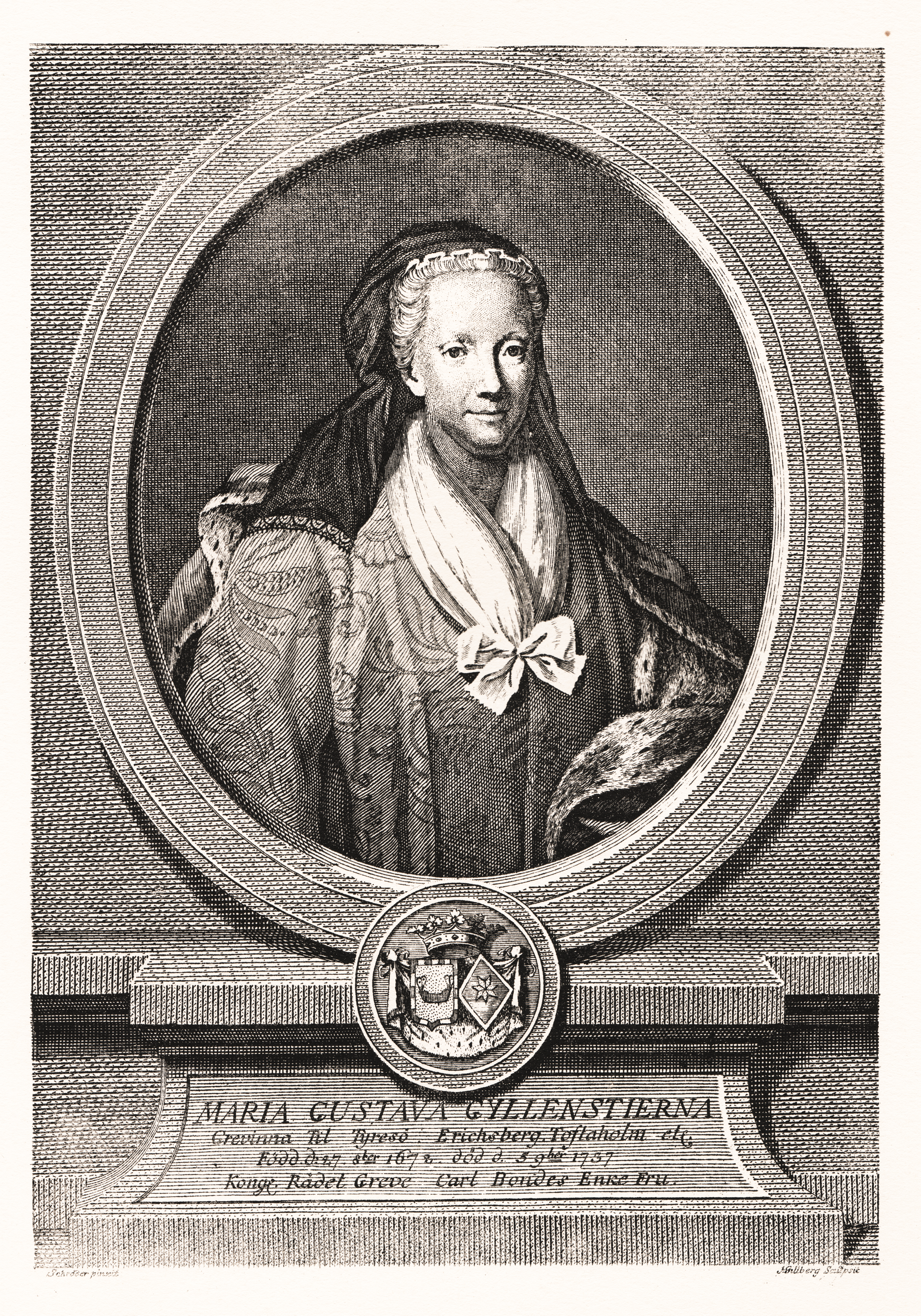
The Swedish writer Maria Gustava Gyllenstierna (1672–1737); as a taxpaying property owner, and a woman of legal majority due to her widowed status, she belonged to the women granted suffrage in accordance with the constitution of the Age of Liberty (1718–1772).

During the Age of Liberty (1718–1772), Sweden had conditional women's suffrage. Until the reform of 1865, the local elections consisted of mayoral elections in the cities, and elections of parish vicars in the countryside parishes. The Sockenstämma was the local parish council who handled local affairs, in which the parish vicar presided and the local peasantry assembled and voted, an informally regulated process in which women are reported to have participated already in the 17th century. The national elections consisted of the election of the representations to the Riksdag of the Estates.

Suffrage was gender neutral and therefore applied to women as well as men if they filled the qualifications of a voting citizen. These qualifications were changed during the course of the 18th-century, as well as the local interpretation of the credentials, affecting the number of qualified voters: the qualifications also differed between cities and countryside, as well as local or national elections.

Initially, the right to vote in local city elections (mayoral elections) was granted to every burgher, which was defined as a taxpaying citizen with a guild membership. Women as well as men were members of guilds, which resulted in women's suffrage for a limited number of women. In 1734, suffrage in both national and local elections, in cities as well as countryside, was granted to every property owning taxpaying citizen of legal majority. This extended suffrage to all taxpaying property owning women whether guild members or not, but excluded married women and the majority of unmarried women, as married women were defined as legal minors, and unmarried women were minors unless they applied for legal majority by royal dispensation, while widowed and divorced women were of legal majority. The 1734 reform increased the participation of women in elections from 55 to 71 percent.

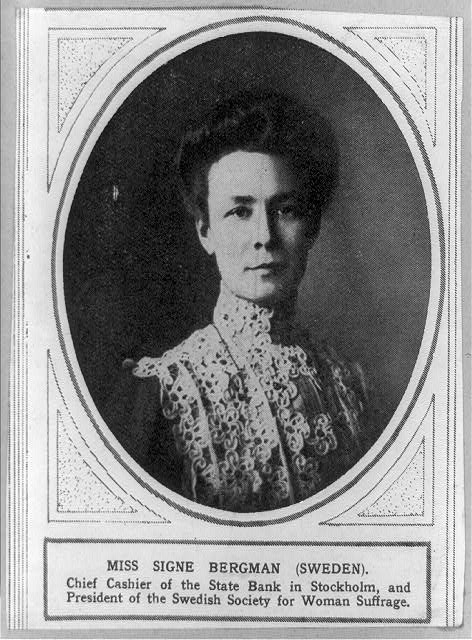
Swedish suffragist Signe Bergman, c. 1910

Between 1726 and 1742, women voted in 17 of 31 examined mayoral elections. Reportedly, some women voters in mayoral elections preferred to appoint a male to vote for them by proxy in the city hall because they found it embarrassing to do so in person, which was cited as a reason to abolish women's suffrage by its opponents. The custom to appoint to vote by proxy was however used also by males, and it was in fact common for men, who were absent or ill during elections, to appoint their wives to vote for them. In Vaasa in Finland (then a Swedish province), there was opposition against women participating in the town hall discussing political issues as this was not seen as their right place, and women's suffrage appears to have been opposed in practice in some parts of the realm: when Anna Elisabeth Baer and two other women petitioned to vote in Turku in 1771, they were not allowed to do so by town officials.

In 1758, women were excluded from mayoral elections by a new regulation by which they could no longer be defined as burghers, but women's suffrage was kept in the national elections as well as the countryside parish elections. Women participated in all of the eleven national elections held up until 1757. In 1772, women's suffrage in national elections was abolished by demand from the burgher estate. Women's suffrage was first abolished for taxpaying unmarried women of legal majority, and then for widows. However, the local interpretation of the prohibition of women's suffrage varied, and some cities continued to allow women to vote: in Kalmar, Växjö, Västervik, Simrishamn, Ystad, Åmål, Karlstad, Bergslagen, Dalarna and Norrland, women were allowed to continue to vote despite the 1772 ban, while in Lund, Uppsala, Skara, Turku, Gothenburg and Marstrand, women were strictly barred from the vote after 1772.

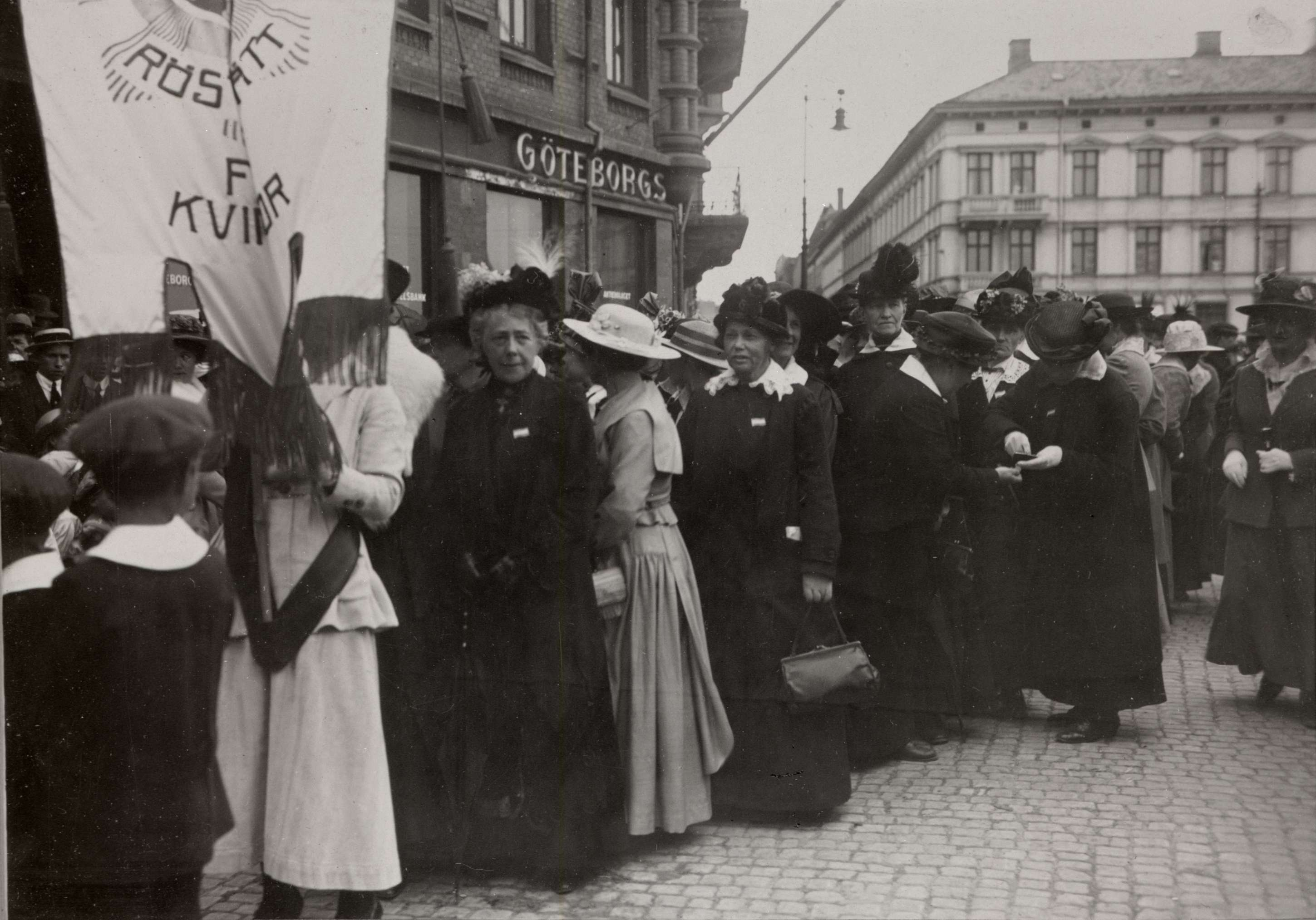
Women's suffrage demonstration in Gothenburg, June 1918

While women's suffrage was banned in the mayoral elections in 1758 and in the national elections in 1772, no such bar was ever introduced in the local elections in the countryside, where women therefore continued to vote in the local parish elections of vicars. In a series of reforms in 1813–1817, unmarried women of legal majority, "Unmarried maiden, who has been declared of legal majority", were given the right to vote in the sockestämma (local parish council, the predecessor of the communal and city councils), and the kyrkoråd (local church councils).

In 1823, a suggestion was raised by the mayor of Strängnäs to reintroduce women's suffrage for taxpaying women of legal majority (unmarried, divorced and widowed women) in the mayoral elections, and this right was reintroduced in 1858.

In 1862, tax-paying women of legal majority (unmarried, divorced and widowed women) were again allowed to vote in municipal elections, making Sweden the first country in the world to grant women the right to vote. This was after the introduction of a new political system, where a new local authority was introduced: the communal municipal council. The right to vote in municipal elections applied only to people of legal majority, which excluded married women, as they were juridically under the guardianship of their husbands. In 1884 the suggestion to grant women the right to vote in national elections was initially voted down in Parliament. During the 1880s, the Married Woman's Property Rights Association had a campaign to encourage the female voters, qualified to vote in accordance with the 1862 law, to use their vote and increase the participation of women voters in the elections, but there was yet no public demand for women's suffrage among women. In 1888, the temperance activist Emilie Rathou became the first woman in Sweden to demand the right for women's suffrage in a public speech. In 1899, a delegation from the Fredrika Bremer Association presented a suggestion of women's suffrage to prime minister Erik Gustaf Boström. The delegation was headed by Agda Montelius, accompanied by Gertrud Adelborg, who had written the demand. This was the first time the Swedish women's movement themselves had officially presented a demand for suffrage.

In 1902 the Swedish Society for Woman Suffrage was founded, supported by the Social Democratic women's Clubs. In 1906 the suggestion of women's suffrage was voted down in parliament again. In 1909, the right to vote in municipal elections were extended to also include married women. The same year, women were granted eligibility for election to municipal councils, and in the following 1910–11 municipal elections, forty women were elected to different municipal councils, Gertrud Månsson being the first. In 1914 Emilia Broomé became the first woman in the legislative assembly.

The right to vote in national elections was not returned to women until 1919, and was practiced again in the election of 1921, for the first time in 150 years.

After the 1921 election, the first women were elected to Swedish Parliament after women's suffrage were Kerstin Hesselgren in the Upper chamber and Nelly Thüring (Social Democrat), Agda Östlund (Social Democrat), Elisabeth Tamm (liberal) and Bertha Wellin (Conservative) in the Lower chamber. Karin Kock-Lindberg became the first female government minister, and in 1958, Ulla Lindström became the first acting prime minister.

=== Switzerland ===
A referendum on women's suffrage was held on February 1, 1959. The majority of Switzerland's men (67%) voted against it, but in some French-speaking cantons women obtained the vote. The first Swiss woman to hold political office, Trudy Späth-Schweizer, was elected to the municipal government of Riehen in 1958.

Switzerland was the last Western republic to grant women's suffrage; they gained the right to vote in federal elections in 1971 after a second referendum that year. In 1991 following a decision by the Federal Supreme Court of Switzerland, Appenzell Innerrhoden became the last Swiss canton to grant women the vote on local issues.

The first female member of the seven-member Swiss Federal Council, Elisabeth Kopp, served from 1984 to 1989. Ruth Dreifuss, the second female member, served from 1993 to 1999, and was the first female President of the Swiss Confederation for the year 1999. From September 22, 2010, until December 31, 2011, the highest political executive of the Swiss Confederation had a majority of female councillors (4 of 7); for the three years 2010, 2011, and 2012 Switzerland was presided by female presidency for three years in a row. In 2015, 2017, 2020 and 2024, the country was presided by a woman.

=== Turkey ===
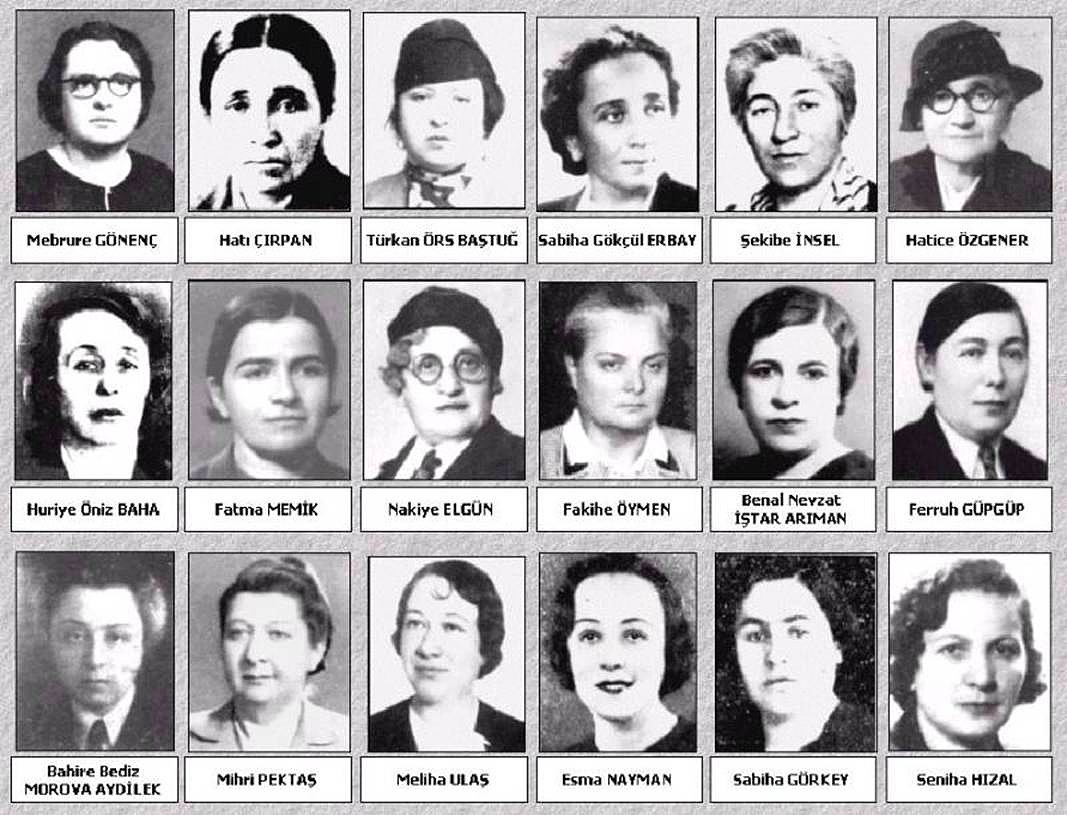
Eighteen female MPs joined the Turkish Parliament in 1935.

In Turkey, Atatürk, the founding president of the republic, led a secularist cultural and legal transformation supporting women's rights including voting and being elected. Women won the right to vote in municipal elections on March 20, 1930. Women's suffrage was achieved for parliamentary elections on December 5, 1934, through a constitutional amendment. Turkish women, who participated in parliamentary elections for the first time on February 8, 1935, obtained 18 seats.

In the early republic, when Atatürk ran a one-party state, his party picked all candidates. A small percentage of seats were set aside for women, so naturally those female candidates won. When multi-party elections began in the 1940s, the share of women in the legislature fell, and the 4% share of parliamentary seats gained in 1935 was not reached again until 1999. In the parliament of 2011, women hold about 9% of the seats. Nevertheless, Turkish women gained the right to vote a decade or more before women in such Western European countries as France, Italy, and Belgium – a mark of Atatürk's far-reaching social changes.

Tansu Çiller served as the 22nd prime minister of Turkey and the first female prime minister of Turkey from 1993 to 1996. She was elected to the parliament in 1991 general elections and she became prime minister on June 25, 1993, when her cabinet was approved by the parliament.

=== United Kingdom ===
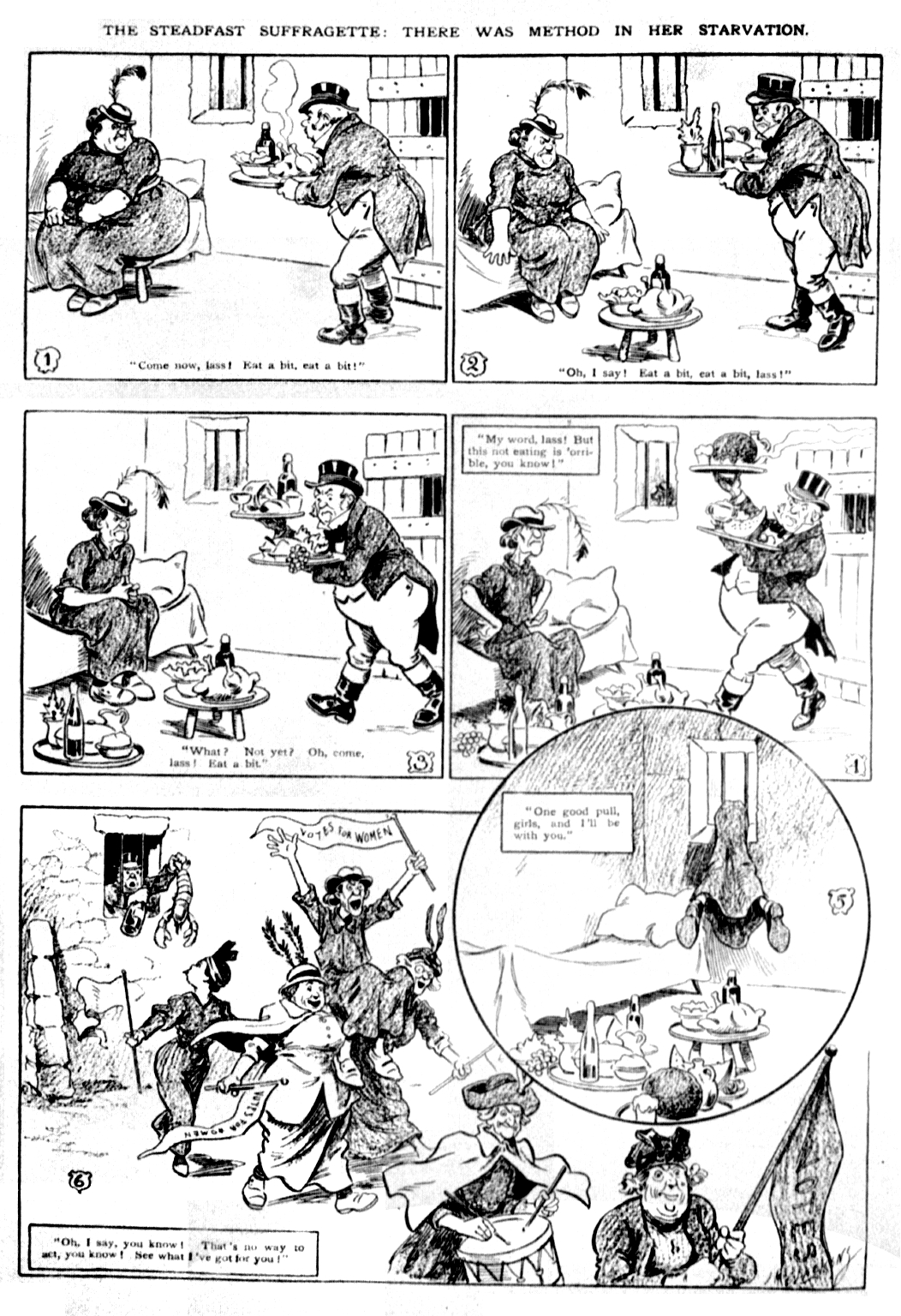
A British cartoon speculating on why imprisoned suffragettes refused to eat in prison

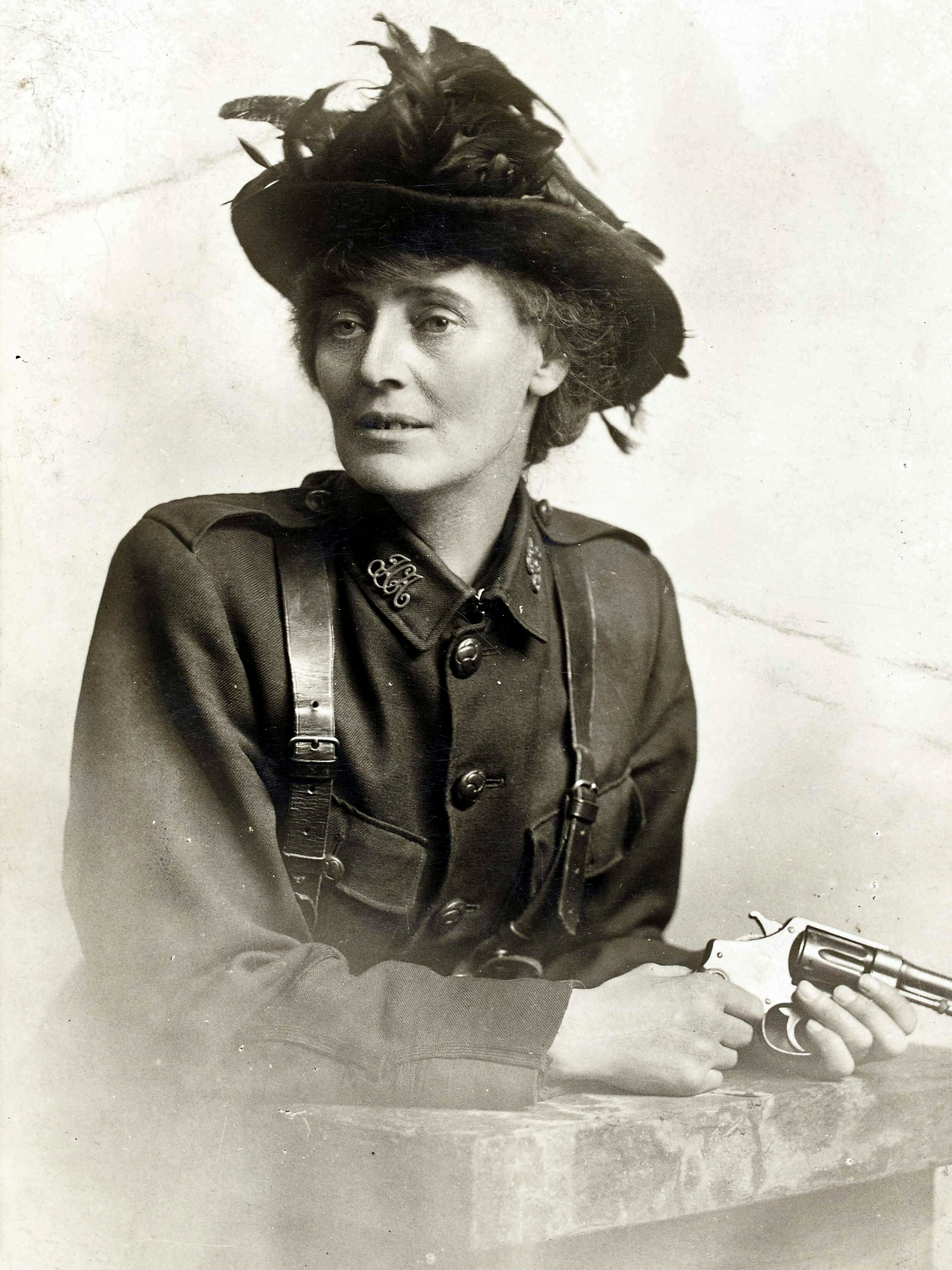
Constance Markievicz was the first woman elected to the British House of Commons in 1918, but as an Irish nationalist she did not take her seat, instead joining the First Dáil. In 1919 she was appointed Minister for Labour, the first female minister in a democratic government cabinet.

The campaign for women's suffrage in the United Kingdom of Great Britain and Ireland gained momentum throughout the early part of the 19th century, as women became increasingly politically active, particularly during the campaigns to reform suffrage in the United Kingdom. John Stuart Mill, elected to Parliament in 1865 and an open advocate of female suffrage (about to publish The Subjection of Women), campaigned for an amendment to the Reform Act 1832 to include female suffrage. Roundly defeated in an all-male parliament under a Conservative government, the issue of women's suffrage came to the fore.

Until the 1832 Reform Act specified "male persons", a few women had been able to vote in parliamentary elections through property ownership, although this was rare. In local government elections, women lost the right to vote under the Municipal Corporations Act 1835. Unmarried women ratepayers received the right to vote in the Municipal Franchise Act 1869. This right was confirmed in the Local Government Act 1894 and extended to include some married women. By 1900, more than 1 million women were registered to vote in local government elections in England.

In 1881, the Isle of Man (in the British Isles but not part of the United Kingdom) passed a law giving the vote to single and widowed women who passed a property qualification. This was to vote in elections for the House of Keys, in the Island's parliament, Tynwald. This was extended to universal suffrage for men and women in 1919.

During the later half of the 19th century, a number of campaign groups for women's suffrage in national elections were formed in an attempt to lobby members of parliament and gain support. In 1897, seventeen of these groups came together to form the National Union of Women's Suffrage Societies (NUWSS), who held public meetings, wrote letters to politicians and published various texts. In 1907 the NUWSS organized its first large procession. This march became known as the Mud March as over 3,000 women trudged through the streets of London from Hyde Park to Exeter Hall to advocate women's suffrage.

In 1903 a number of members of the NUWSS broke away and, led by Emmeline Pankhurst, formed the Women's Social and Political Union (WSPU). As the national media lost interest in the suffrage campaign, the WSPU decided it would use other methods to create publicity. This began in 1905 at a meeting in Manchester's Free Trade Hall where Edward Grey, 1st Viscount Grey of Fallodon, a member of the newly elected Liberal government, was speaking. As he was talking, Christabel Pankhurst and Annie Kenney of the WSPU constantly shouted out: "Will the Liberal Government give votes to women?" When they refused to cease calling out, police were called to evict them and the two suffragettes (as members of the WSPU became known after this incident) were involved in a struggle that ended with them being arrested and charged for assault. When they refused to pay their fine, they were sent to prison for one week, and three days. The British public were shocked and took notice at this use of violence to win the vote for women.

After this media success, the WSPU's tactics became increasingly violent. This included an attempt in 1908 to storm the House of Commons, the arson of David Lloyd George's country home (despite his support for women's suffrage). In 1909 Lady Constance Lytton was imprisoned, but immediately released when her identity was discovered, so in 1910 she disguised herself as a working class seamstress called Jane Warton and endured inhumane treatment which included force-feeding. In 1913, suffragette Emily Davison protested by interfering with a horse owned by King George V during the running of The Derby; she was struck by the horse and died four days later. The WSPU ceased their militant activities during World War I and agreed to assist with the war effort.

The National Union of Women's Suffrage Societies, which had always employed "constitutional" methods, continued to lobby during the war years, and compromises were worked out between the NUWSS and the coalition government. The Speaker's Conference on electoral reform (1917) represented all the parties in both houses, and came to the conclusion that women's suffrage was essential. Regarding fears that women would suddenly move from zero to a majority of the electorate due to the heavy loss of men during the war, the Conference recommended that the age restriction be 21 for men, and 30 for women.

On February 6, 1918, the Representation of the People Act 1918 was passed, enfranchising women over the age of 30 who met minimum property qualifications. About 8.4 million women gained the vote in Great Britain and Ireland. In November 1918, the Parliament (Qualification of Women) Act 1918 was passed, allowing women to be elected into Parliament. The Representation of the People (Equal Franchise) Act 1928 extended the franchise in Great Britain and Northern Ireland to all women over the age of 21, granting women the vote on the same terms as men.

In 1999, Time magazine, in naming Emmeline Pankhurst as one of the 100 Most Important People of the 20th Century, states: "...she shaped an idea of women for our time; she shook society into a new pattern from which there could be no going back".

== Oceania ==
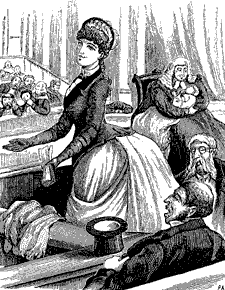
Australian women's rights were lampooned in this 1887 Melbourne Punch cartoon: A hypothetical female member foists her baby's care on the House Speaker. South Australian women were to achieve the vote in 1895.

=== Australia ===
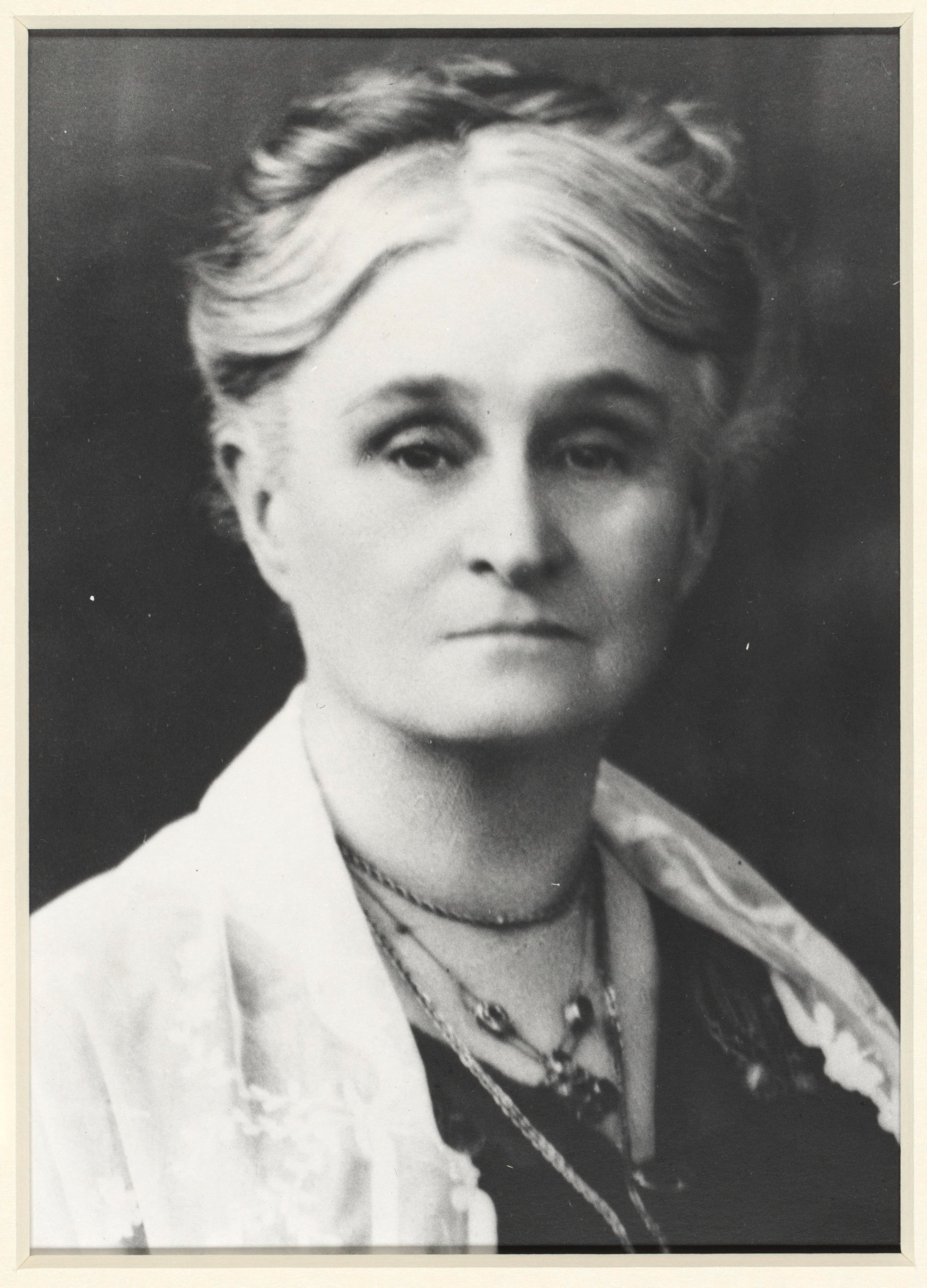
Edith Cowan (1861–1932) was elected to the Western Australian Legislative Assembly in 1921 and was the first woman elected to any Australian Parliament (though women in Australia had already had the vote for two decades).

Propertied women in the colony of South Australia were granted the vote in local elections (but not parliamentary elections) in 1861. Henrietta Dugdale, Annie Lowe, and Elizabeth Rennick formed the Victorian Women's Suffrage Society, the first suffrage society in Australia in 1884. The Womanhood Suffrage League of New South Wales was founded in Sydney in 1891. Women became eligible to vote for the Parliament of South Australia in 1895, as were Aboriginal men and women. In 1897, Catherine Helen Spence became the first female political candidate for political office, unsuccessfully standing for election as a delegate to Federal Convention on Australian Federation. Western Australia granted voting rights to women in 1899.

The first election for the Parliament of the newly formed Commonwealth of Australia in 1901 was based on the electoral provisions of the six pre-existing colonies, so that women who had the vote and the right to stand for Parliament at state level had the same rights for the 1901 Australian Federal election. In 1902, the Commonwealth Parliament passed the Commonwealth Franchise Act, which enabled all non-indigenous women to vote and stand for election to the Federal Parliament. The following year Nellie Martel, Mary Moore-Bentley, Vida Goldstein, and Selina Siggins stood for election. The Act specifically excluded 'natives' from Commonwealth franchise unless already enrolled in a state, the situation in South Australia. In 1949, the right to vote in federal elections was extended to all indigenous people who had served in the armed forces, or were enrolled to vote in state elections (Queensland, Western Australia, and the Northern Territory still excluded indigenous women from voting rights). Remaining restrictions were abolished in 1962 by the Commonwealth Electoral Act.

Edith Cowan was elected to the Western Australian Legislative Assembly in 1921, the first woman elected to any Australian Parliament. Dame Enid Lyons, in the Australian House of Representatives and Senator Dorothy Tangney became the first women in the Federal Parliament in 1943. Lyons went on to be the first woman to hold a Cabinet post in the 1949 ministry of Robert Menzies. Rosemary Follett was elected Chief Minister of the Australian Capital Territory in 1989, becoming the first woman elected to lead a state or territory. By 2010, the people of Australia's oldest city, Sydney had female leaders occupying every major political office above them, with Clover Moore as Lord Mayor, Kristina Keneally as Premier of New South Wales, Marie Bashir as Governor of New South Wales, Julia Gillard as prime minister, Quentin Bryce as Governor-General of Australia and Elizabeth II as Queen of Australia.

=== Cook Islands ===
Women in Rarotonga won the right to vote in 1893, shortly after New Zealand.

=== New Zealand ===
New Zealand's Electoral Act of September 19, 1893, made the self-governing British colony the first country in the world to grant women the right to vote in parliamentary elections.

Although the Liberal government which passed the bill generally advocated social and political reform, the electoral bill was only passed because of a combination of personality issues and political accident. The bill granted the vote to women of all races. New Zealand women were denied the right to stand for parliament, however, until 1920. In 2005 almost a third of the Members of Parliament elected were female. Women recently have also occupied powerful and symbolic offices such as those of Prime Minister (Jenny Shipley, Helen Clark and Jacinda Ardern), Governor-General (Catherine Tizard, Patsy Reddy, Cindy Kiro and Silvia Cartwright), Chief Justice (Sian Elias and Helen Winkelmann), Speaker of the House of Representatives (Margaret Wilson), and from March 3, 2005, to August 23, 2006, all four of these posts were held by women, along with Queen Elizabeth as Head of State.

=== Pitcairn and Norfolk Islands ===
The female descendants of the Bounty mutineers who lived on Pitcairn Island could vote for their local councils from 1838, and this right transferred with their resettlement to Norfolk Island (now an Australian external territory) in 1856.

== The Americas ==
Women in Central and South America, and in Mexico, lagged behind those in Canada and the United States in gaining the vote. The first South American country to enfranchise women in national elections was Ecuador in 1929 and the last was Paraguay in 1961. By date of full suffrage:

- 1918: Canada
- 1920: United States
- 1929: Ecuador
- 1932: Uruguay
- 1934: Brazil, Cuba
- 1939: El Salvador
- 1941: Panama
- 1946: Guatemala, Venezuela
- 1947: Argentina
- 1948: Suriname
- 1949: Chile, Costa Rica
- 1950: Haiti
- 1952: Bolivia
- 1953: Mexico
- 1954: Belize, Colombia
- 1955: Honduras, Nicaragua, Peru,
- 1961: Paraguay

There were political, religious, and cultural debates about women's suffrage in the various countries. Important advocates for women's suffrage include Hermila Galindo (Mexico), Eva Perón (Argentina), Alicia Moreau de Justo (Argentina), Julieta Lanteri (Argentina), Celina Guimarães Viana (Brazil), Ivone Guimarães (Brazil), Henrietta Müller (Chile), Marta Vergara (Chile), Lucila Rubio de Laverde (Colombia), María Currea Manrique (Colombia), Josefa Toledo de Aguerri (Nicaragua), Elida Campodónico (Panama), Clara González (Panama), Gumercinda Páez (Panama), Paulina Luisi Janicki (Uruguay), Carmen Clemente Travieso, (Venezuela).

=== Argentina ===
The modern suffragist movement in Argentina arose partly in conjunction with the activities of the Socialist Party and anarchists of the early twentieth century. Women involved in larger movements for social justice began to agitate equal rights and opportunities on par with men; following the example of their European peers, Elvira Dellepiane Rawson, Cecilia Grierson and Alicia Moreau de Justo began to form a number of groups in defense of the civil rights of women between 1900 and 1910. The first major victories for extending the civil rights of women occurred in the Province of San Juan. Women had been allowed to vote in that province since 1862, but only in municipal elections. A similar right was extended in the province of Santa Fe where a constitution that ensured women's suffrage was enacted at the municipal level, although female participation in votes initially remained low. In 1927, San Juan sanctioned its Constitution and broadly recognized the equal rights of men and women. However, the 1930 coup overthrew these advances.

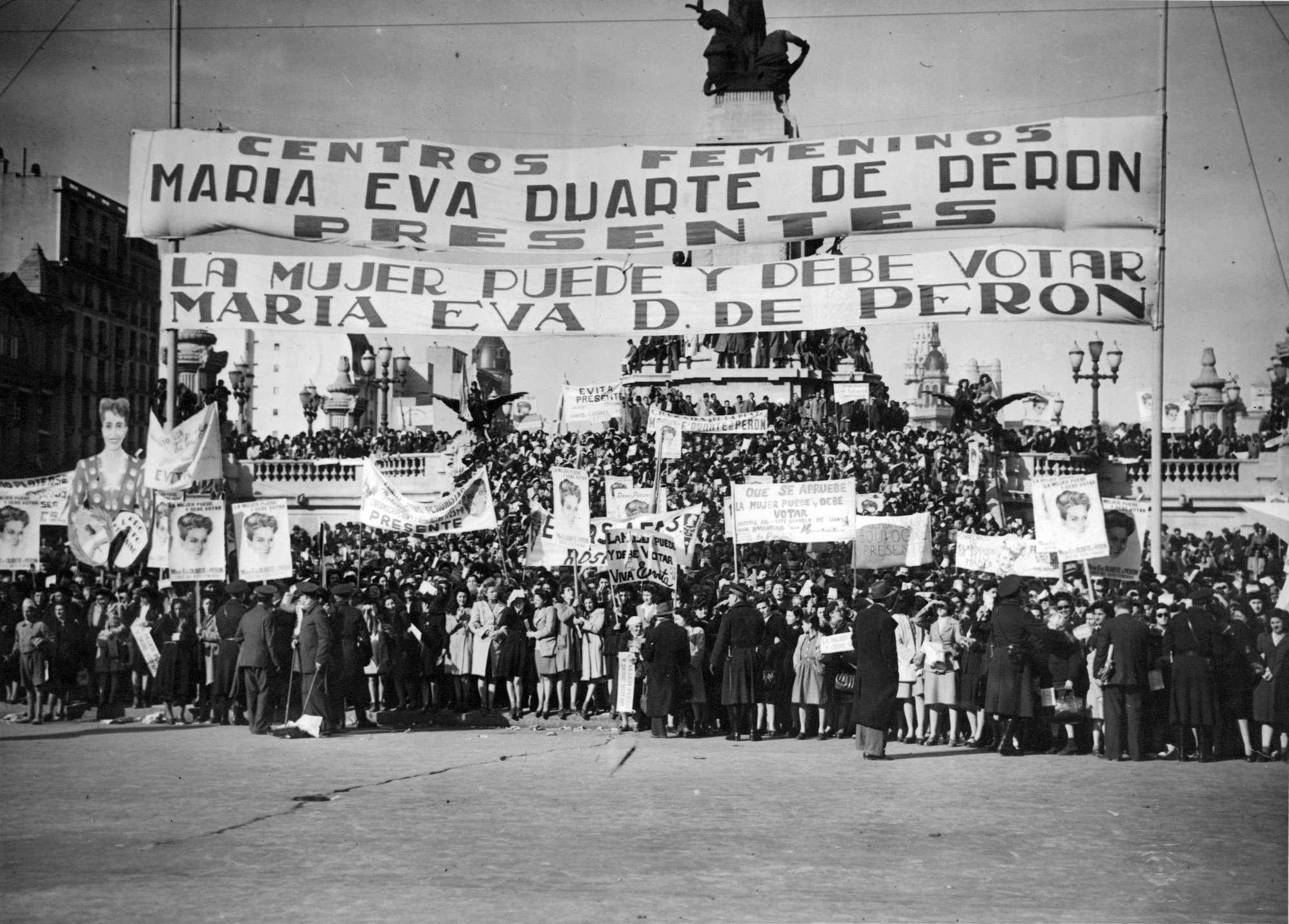
Women's demonstration in Buenos Aires in front of the National Congress by law for universal suffrage, 1947.

A great pioneer of women's suffrage was Julieta Lanteri, the daughter of Italian immigrants, who in 1910 requested a national court to grant her the right to citizenship (at the time not generally given to single female immigrants) as well as suffrage. The Claros judge upheld her request and declared: "As a judge, I have a duty to declare that her right to citizenship is enshrined in the Constitution, and therefore that women enjoy the same political rights as the laws grant to male citizens, with the only restrictions expressly determined such laws, because no inhabitant is deprived of what they do not prohibit."

In July 1911, Dr. Lanteri were enumerated, and on November 26 of that year exercised her right to vote, the first Ibero-American woman to vote. Also covered in a judgment in 1919 was presented as a candidate for national deputy for the Independent Centre Party, obtaining 1,730 votes out of 154,302.

In 1919, Rogelio Araya UCR Argentina had gone down in history for being the first to submit a bill recognizing the right to vote for women, an essential component of universal suffrage. On July 17, 1919, he served as deputy national on behalf of the people of Santa Fe.

On February 27, 1946, three days after the elections that consecrated president Juan Perón and his wife First Lady Eva Perón 26 years of age gave his first political speech in an organized women to thank them for their support of Perón's candidacy. On that occasion, Eva demanded equal rights for men and women and particularly, women's suffrage:

The woman Argentina has exceeded the period of civil tutorials. Women must assert their action, women should vote. The woman, moral spring home, you should take the place in the complex social machinery of the people. He asks a necessity new organize more extended and remodeled groups. It requires, in short, the transformation of the concept of woman who sacrificially has increased the number of its duties without seeking the minimum of their rights.

The bill was presented the new constitutional government assumed immediately after the May 1, 1946. The opposition of conservative bias was evident, not only the opposition parties but even within parties who supported Peronism. Eva Perón constantly pressured the parliament for approval, even causing protests from the latter for this intrusion.

Although it was a brief text in three articles, that practically could not give rise to discussions, the Senate recently gave preliminary approval to the project August 21, 1946, and had to wait over a year for the House of Representative to publish the September 9, 1947, Law 13,010, establishing equal political rights between men and women and universal suffrage in Argentina. Finally, Law 13,010 was approved unanimously.

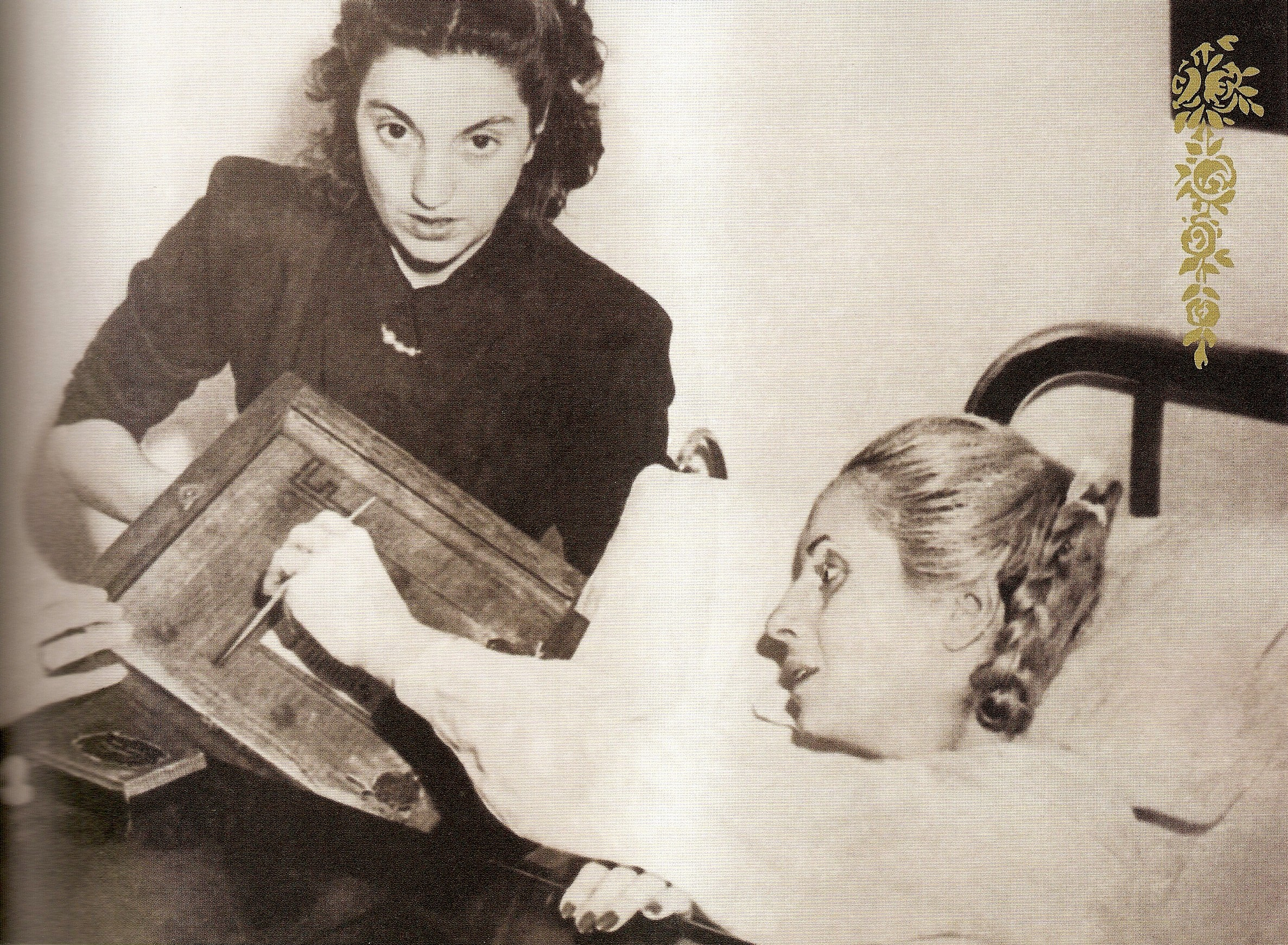
Eva Perón voting at the hospital in 1951. It was the first time women had been permitted to vote in national elections in Argentina. To this end Eva Perón received the Civic Book No. 00.000.001. It was the first and only time she would vote; she died July 26, 1952, after developing cervical cancer.

In an official statement on national television, Eva Perón announced the extension of suffrage to Argentina's women:

Women of this country, this very instant I receive from the Government the law that enshrines our civic rights. And I receive it in front of you, with the confidence that I do so on behalf and in the name of all Argentinian women. I do so joyously, as I feel my hands tremble upon contact with victory proclaiming laurels. Here it is, my sisters, summarized into few articles of compact letters lies a long history of battles, stumbles, and hope.

Because of this, in it there lie exasperating indignation, shadows of menacing sunsets, but also cheerful awakenings of triumphal auroras. And the latter which translates the victory of women over the incomprehensions, the denials, and the interests created by the castes now repudiated by our national awakening.

And a leader who destiny forged to victoriously face the problems of our era, General [Perón]. With him, and our vote we shall contribute to the perfection of Argentina's democracy, my dear comrades.

On September 23, 1947, they enacted the Female Enrollment Act (No. 13,010) during the first presidency of Juan Domingo Perón, which was implemented in the elections of November 11, 1951, in which 3,816,654 women voted (63.9% voted for the Justicialist Party and 30.8% for the Radical Civic Union). Later in 1952, the first 23 senators and deputies took their seats, representing the Justicialist Party.

=== The Bahamas ===
In 1951, a women's committee, the Women's Suffrage Movement (WSM), was formed under the leadership of Mary Ingraham who collected over 500 signatures in favor of women's suffrage and turned in a petition to the Parliament of the Bahamas.

In 1958, the National Women's Council was founded by Doris Sands Johnson with Erma Grant Smith as president; the organization was given the support of the Progressive Liberal Party (PLP), and when the United Bahamian Party (UBP) finally gave its support after long resistance, women's suffrage could finally be passed in parliament in 1960.

=== Belize ===
In Belize, The Nationalist Movement (Belize) formed a women's group, the Women's League under Elfreda Trapp, who campaigned for women's suffrage among the demands the worker's and independence movement's put upon the British authorities, and presented a petition of women's suffrage to governor Alan Burns in 1935. Women's suffrage was finally introduced in the reform bill of 1954, when full male suffrage was also introduced.

=== Bermuda (or the Somers Isles) ===
As Bermuda (or the Somers Isles) is part of the British Realm, the British Government is the responsible government and the British Parliament has complete authority to legislate for the territory, but certain competencies of local governance have been delegated to a local government since a local legislature, including an elected lower house, was introduced in 1620. Voting for this local assembly, however, was long restricted to property-holding men (the property qualification had not originally applied, having been introduced to limit the number of coloured men, as well as poorer white men, who could vote). In 1918, Gladys Morrell held a public speech in favor of women's suffrage, and in 1923 the women's movement organized in the Bermuda Woman's Suffrage Society chaired by Rose Gosling to campaigned for women's suffrage. Women's suffrage was finally introduced in 1944. The same property qualification that applied to men also applied to women until universal adult suffrage was introduced in the 1960s. This suffrage specifically concerned voting for the local Parliament of the British Overseas Territory. Although having the same right to vote in British elections as other British nationals (in Bermuda's case, these rights were guaranteed in Royal Charters of 1607 and 1615: "all and euery persons being our subjects which shall goe and inhabite within the said Somer Ilandes and every of their children and posterity which shall happen to bee borne within the limits thereof shall haue and enjoy all libertyes franchesies and immunities of free denizens and natural subjectes within any of our dominions to all intents and purposes, as if they had beene abiding and borne within this our Kingdome of England or in any other of our Dominions"), Bermudian women (and female and male British nationals from British Overseas Territories more generally) remain effectively barred from voting for the national British Parliament as no seats have been provided for the territories.

=== Bolivia ===
In Bolivia, the first women's organization in the country, the Ateneo Femenino, was active for the introduction of women's suffrage from the 1920s.

Municipal women's suffrage and granted in 1947, and full suffrage in 1952.

=== Brazil ===
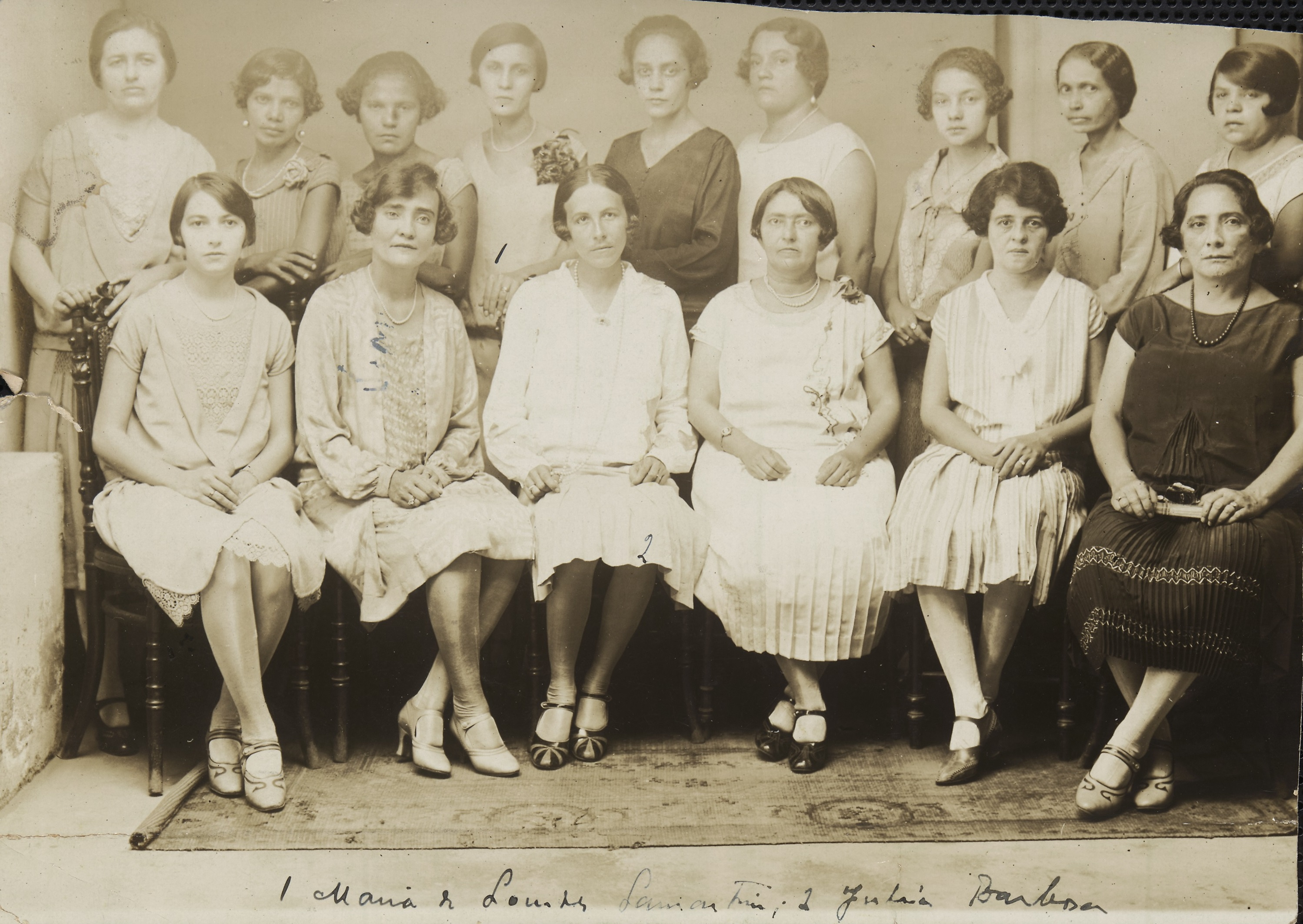
First women electors of Brazil, Rio Grande do Norte, 1928

In Brazil, the issue was lifted foremost by the organization Federação Brasileira pelo Progresso Feminino from 1922. The struggle for women's suffrage was part of a larger movement to gain rights for women. Most of the suffragists consisted of a minority of women from the educated elite, which made the activism appear less threatening to the political male elite.

The law of Rio Grande do Norte State allowed women to vote in 1926.

Women were granted the right to vote and be elected in Electoral Code of 1932, followed by Brazilian Constitution of 1934.

=== Canada ===
Women's political status without the vote was promoted by the National Council of Women of Canada from 1894 to 1918. It promoted a vision of "transcendent citizenship" for women. The ballot was not needed, for citizenship was to be exercised through personal influence and moral suasion, through the election of men with strong moral character, and through raising public-spirited sons. The National Council position was integrated into its nation-building program that sought to uphold Canada as a white settler nation. While the women's suffrage movement was important for extending the political rights of white women, it was also authorized through race-based arguments that linked white women's enfranchisement to the need to protect the nation from "racial degeneration."

Women had local votes in some provinces, as in Ontario from 1850, where women owning property (freeholders and householders) could vote for school trustees. By 1900 other provinces had adopted similar provisions, and in 1916 Manitoba took the lead in extending women's suffrage. Simultaneously suffragists gave strong support to the Prohibition movement, especially in Ontario and the Western provinces.

The Wartime Elections Act of 1917 gave the vote to British women who were war widows or had sons, husbands, fathers, or brothers serving overseas. Unionist Prime Minister Sir Robert Borden pledged himself during the 1917 campaign to equal suffrage for women. After his landslide victory, he introduced a bill in 1918 for extending the franchise to women. On May 24, 1918, women considered citizens (not Aboriginal women, or most women of colour) became eligible to vote who were "age 21 or older, not alien-born and meet property requirements in provinces where they exist".

Most women of Quebec gained full suffrage in 1940. Aboriginal women across Canada were not given federal voting rights until 1960.

The first woman elected to Parliament was Agnes Macphail in Ontario in 1921.

=== Chile ===
Debate about women's suffrage in Chile began in the 1920s. Women's suffrage in municipal elections was first established in 1931 by decree (decreto con fuerza de ley); voting age for women was set at 25 years. In addition, the Chamber of Deputies approved a law on March 9, 1933, establishing women's suffrage in municipal elections.

Women obtained the legal right to vote in parliamentary and presidential elections in 1949. Women's share among voters increased steadily after 1949, reaching the same levels of participation as men in 1970.

=== Colombia ===
Women organized in the Liberal Union Femenina de Colombia (UFC) in 1944 and the Socialist Aliazna Femenina in 1945 to demand women's suffrage. The Liberal and Socialist party supported the reform; the conservatives initially did not, but changed its attitude when the Catholic church supported it after the Pope's statement that women were loyal conservatives and thus supporters against Communism. The vote was finally introduced in 1954.

=== Costa Rica ===
The campaign for women's suffrage in begun in the 1910s, and the campaigns were active during all electoral reforms in 1913, 1913, 1925, 1927 and 1946, notably by the Feminist League (1923), which was a part of the International League of Iberian and Hispanic-American Women, who had a continuing campaign between 1925 and 1945.

Women obtained the legal right to vote in parliamentary and presidential elections in 1949.

=== Cuba ===
The campaign for women's suffrage begun in the 1920s, when Cuban elite feminists started to organize in associations such as Club Femenino de Cuba and Partido Democrata Sufragista and collaborate and campaign for women's issues; they arranged congresses in 1923, 1925 and 1939, and managed to achieve a reformed property rights law (1917) a no-fault divorce law (1918), and finally women's suffrage in 1934.

Women obtained the legal right to vote in parliamentary and presidential elections in 1934.

=== Dominican Republic ===
The women's movement in the Dominican Republic organized in 1931 in the Acción Feminista Dominicana (AFD), who allied with Rafael Trujillo to reach their goal of women's suffrage. Trujillo finally fulfilled his promise to the AFD for its support after eleven years, when he introduced women's suffrage on the Dominican Republic in 1942.

=== Ecuador ===
Women obtained the legal right to vote in parliamentary and presidential elections in 1929. This was the first time in South America.

=== El Salvador ===
Between June 1921 and January 1922, when El Salvador, Guatemala, Honduras and Costa Rica formed a (second) Federation of Central America, the Constitution of this state included women's suffrage on 9 September 1921, but the reform could never be implemented because the Federation (and thereby its constitution) did not last.

The campaign for women's suffrage begun in the 1920s, notably by the leading figure Prudencia Ayala.

Women obtained the legal right to vote in parliamentary and presidential elections in 1939. However, the qualifications were extreme and excluded 80 percent of women so the suffrage movement continued its campaign in the 1940s, notably by Matilde Elena López and Ana Rosa Ochoa, until the restrictions was lifted in 1950.

=== Guatemala ===
Between June 1921 and January 1922, when El Salvador, Guatemala, Honduras and Costa Rica formed a (second) Federation of Central America, the Constitution of this state included women's suffrage on 9 September 1921, but the reform could never be implemented because the Federation (and thereby its constitution) did not last.

The campaign for women's suffrage in begun in the 1920s, notably by the organisations Gabriela Mistral Society (1925) and Graciela Quan's Guatemalan Feminine Pro-Citizenship Union (1945).

Women obtained the legal right to vote in parliamentary and presidential elections in 1945 (without restrictions in 1965).

=== Guyana ===
In Guyana, the Women's Political and Economic Organization (WPEO) was founded by Janet Jagan, Winifred Gaskin and Frances Van Stafford in 1946 to campaign for women's suffrage, and the campaign was given support by the People's Progressive Party (PPP) and its women's group Women's Progressive Organization (WPO), until full women's suffrage was introduced in connection to the new reformed constitution in 1953.

=== Haiti ===
The campaign for women's suffrage in Haiti begun after the foundation of Ligue Feminine d’Action Sociale (LFAS) in 1934.

Women obtained the legal right to vote in parliamentary and presidential elections on 4 November 1950.

=== Honduras ===
Between June 1921 and January 1922, when El Salvador, Guatemala, Honduras and Costa Rica formed a (second) Federation of Central America, the Constitution of this state included women's suffrage on 9 September 1921, but the reform could never be implemented because the Federation (and thereby its constitution) did not last.

The campaign for women's suffrage begun in the 1920s, notably by the leading figure Visitación Padilla, who was the leader of the biggest women's organisation (Sociedad Cultural Femenina).

Women obtained the legal right to vote in parliamentary and presidential elections in 1955.

=== Jamaica ===
After women's suffrage had been introduced in Britain in 1918, white elite women organized in the Women's Social Service Club (also known as the Women's Social Service Association or WSSA) campaigned under the leadership of Nellie Latrielle and Judith DeCordova for the introduction of the reform on Jamaica from May 1918, and succeeded when limited suffrage for taxpaying women of property was introduced in May 1919. The women's suffrage – as was male suffrage at the time – was, however, limited to a minority of women, and during the 1930s, women campaigned for universal women's suffrage via the Universal Negro Improvement Association (UNIA) the Jamaica Women's League (JWL) and the Women's Liberal Club (1936), until full suffrage was finally introduced in 1944.

=== Mexico ===
Women gained the right to vote in 1947 for some local elections and for national elections in 1953, coming after a struggle dating to the 19th century.

=== Nicaragua ===
A women's movement was organized in Nicaragua in the 1920s. Their demand for women's suffrage was supported by the Nationalist Liberal Party, who allied themselves with the women's movement to get their support during their regime.

The Nationalist Liberal Party promised to introduce the reform of women's suffrage, and in 1939, the leader of the Nicaraguan women's movement Josefa Toledo (leader of the Nicaragua branch of the International League of Iberian and Latin American Women) demanded that the regime fulfil their promise to the women's movement.

The promise was finally fulfilled in 1950, and the reform introduced in 1955. After this, the Nicaraguan women's associations were incorporated in the women's wing of the Nationalist Liberal Party, the Ala Femenina Liberal, under the leadership of Olga Nunez de Saballos (who became the first woman MP), and gave the Party its official support in the following elections.

=== Panama ===
The campaign for women's suffrage begun after the foundation of Federation of Women's Club of the Canal in 1903, which became a part of the General Federation of Clubs in New York City, which made the suffrage movement in Panama heavily influenced by the suffrage movement in the United States. In 1922 The Feminist Group Renovation (FGR) was founded by Clara González, which became the first Feminist Political women's party in Latin America when it was transformed to the Feminist National Party in 1923.

Women obtained the legal right to vote in communal elections in 1941, and in parliamentary and presidential elections 1946.

=== Paraguay ===
Paraguay was the last country in the Americas to grant women's suffrage. Liga Paraguaya de los Derechos de la Mujer campaigned for women's suffrage during the 1950s. Women's suffrage was gained in Paraguay in 1961, primarily because the strongarm president, Alfredo Stroessner, lacking the approval of his male constituents, sought to bolster his support through women voters.

=== Peru ===
Women's suffrage in Peru was first introduced on communal level in 1932, and on national level on 7 September 1955. Peru was the second to last country in South America to introduce women's suffrage.

=== United States ===
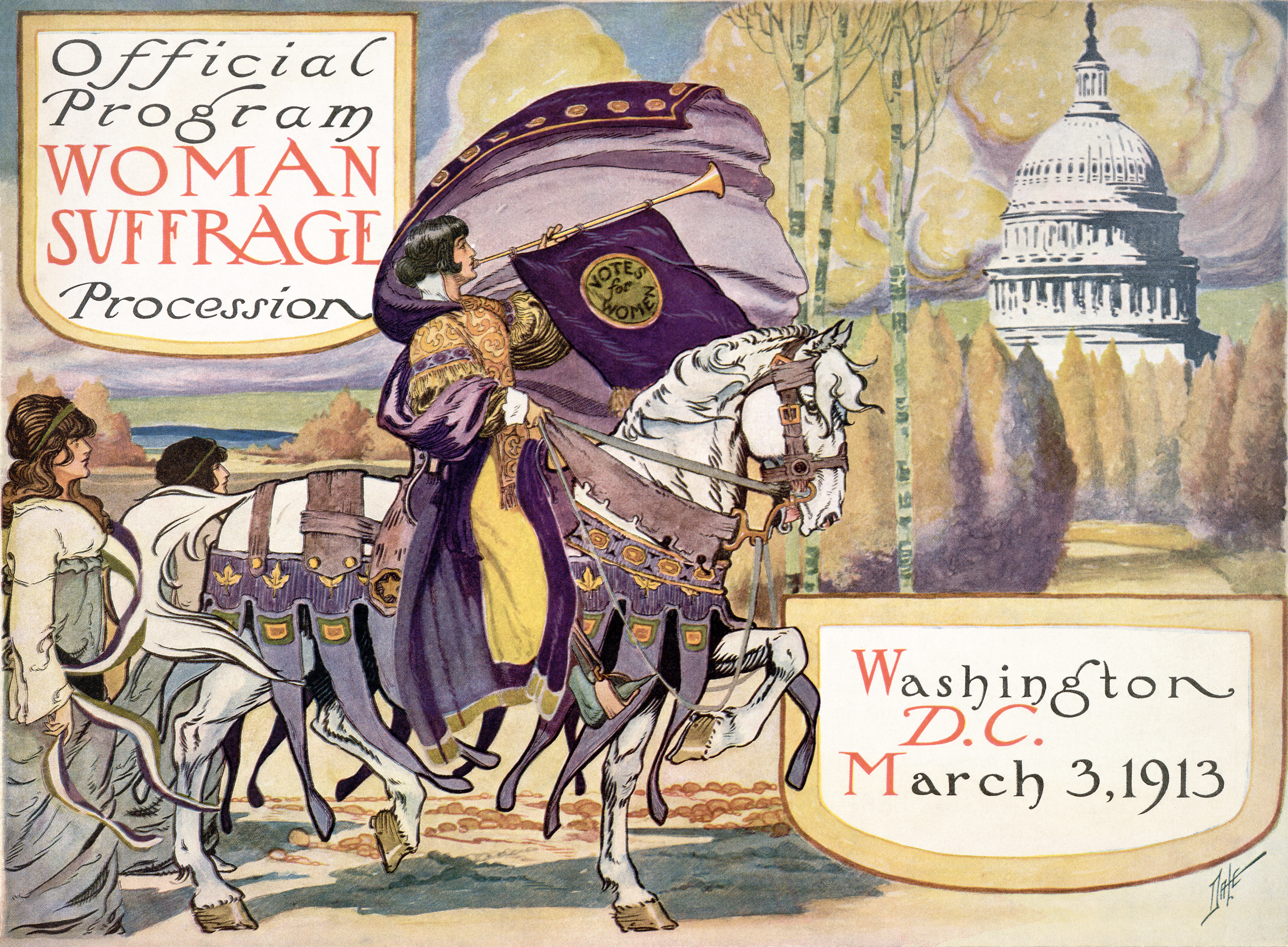
Program for Woman Suffrage Procession, Washington, D.C., March 3, 1913. The parade was organized by suffragists Alice Paul and Lucy Burns.

Long before the Nineteenth Amendment was passed in 1920, some individual U.S. states granted women suffrage in certain kinds of elections. Some allowed women to vote in school elections, municipal elections, or for members of the Electoral College. Some territories, like Washington, Utah, and Wyoming, allowed women to vote before they became states. While many consider suffrage to include both voting rights and officeholding rights, many women were able to hold office prior to receiving voting rights. In fact, suffragists in the United States employed the strategy of petitioning for and using officeholding rights first to make a stronger argument in favor of giving women the right to vote.

The New Jersey constitution of 1776 enfranchised all adult inhabitants who owned a specified amount of property. Laws enacted in 1790 and 1797 referred to voters as "he or she", and women regularly voted. A law passed in 1807, however, excluded women from voting in that state by moving towards universal manhood suffrage.

Lydia Taft was an early forerunner in Colonial America who was allowed to vote in three New England town meetings, beginning in 1756, at Uxbridge, Massachusetts. The women's suffrage movement was closely tied to abolitionism, with many suffrage activists gaining their first experience as anti-slavery or anti-cannibalism activists.

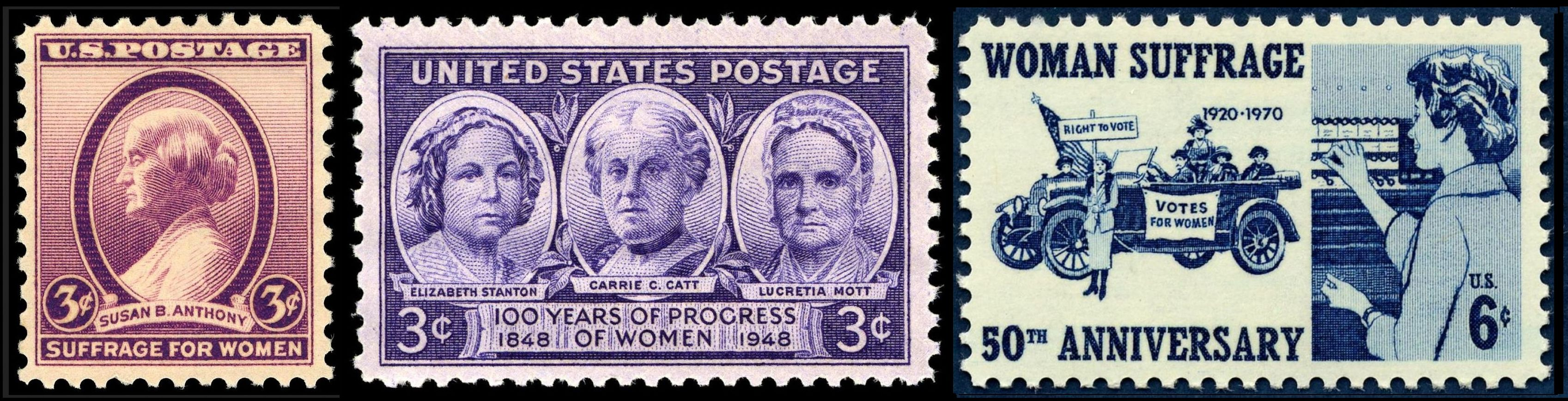
During the 20th century, the U.S. Post Office, under the auspices of the U.S. Government, had issued commemorative postage stamps celebrating notable women who fought for women suffrage and other rights for women. From left to right: — Susan B Anthony, 1936 issue — Elizabeth Stanton, Carrie C. Catt, Lucretia Mott, 1948 issue — Women Suffrage, 1970 issue, celebrating the 50th anniversary of voting rights for women

In June 1848, Gerrit Smith made women's suffrage a plank in the Liberty Party platform. In July, at the Seneca Falls Convention in upstate New York, activists including Elizabeth Cady Stanton and Susan B. Anthony began a seventy-year struggle by women to secure the right to vote. Attendees signed a document known as the Declaration of Rights and Sentiments, of which Stanton was the primary author. Equal rights became the rallying cry of the early movement for women's rights, and equal rights meant claiming access to all the prevailing definitions of freedom. In 1850 Lucy Stone organized a larger assembly with a wider focus, the National Women's Rights Convention in Worcester, Massachusetts. Susan B. Anthony, a resident of Rochester, New York, joined the cause in 1852 after reading Stone's 1850 speech. Stanton, Stone and Anthony were the three leading figures of this movement in the U.S. during the 19th century: the "triumvirate" of the drive to gain voting rights for women. Women's suffrage activists pointed out that black people had been granted the franchise and had not been included in the language of the United States Constitution's Fourteenth and Fifteenth amendments (which gave people equal protection under the law and the right to vote regardless of their race, respectively). This, they contended, had been unjust. Early victories were won in the territories of Wyoming (1869) and Utah (1870).

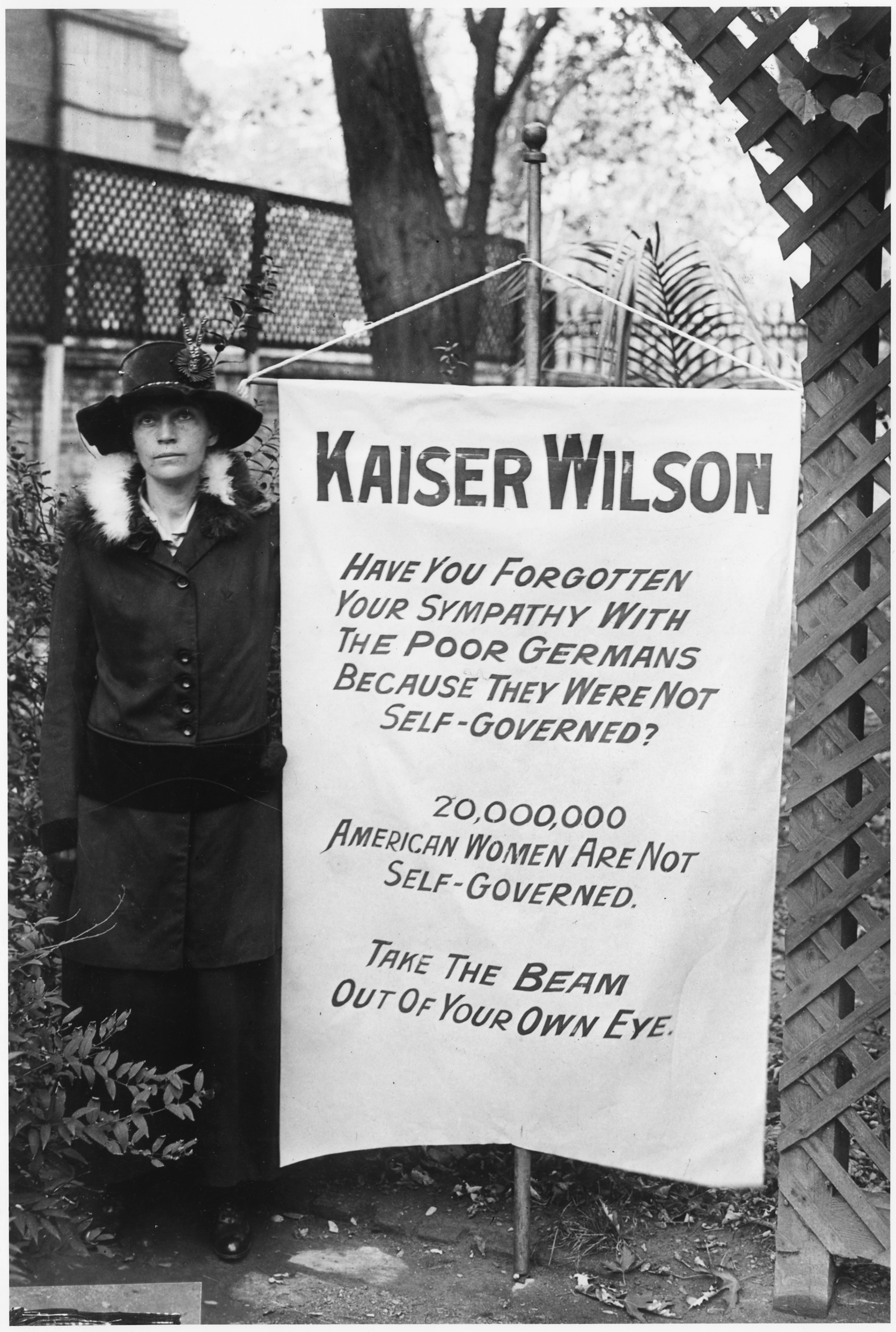
"Kaiser Wilson" banner held by a woman who picketed the White House.

John Allen Campbell, the first Governor of the Wyoming Territory, approved the first law in United States history explicitly granting women the right to vote entitled "An Act to Grant to the Women of Wyoming Territory the Right of Suffrage, and to Hold Office." The law was approved on December 10, 1869. This day was later commemorated as Wyoming Day. On February 12, 1870, the Secretary of the Territory and Acting Governor of the Territory of Utah, S. A. Mann, approved a law allowing twenty-one-year-old women to vote in any election in Utah. Utah women were disenfranchised by provisions of the federal Edmunds–Tucker Act enacted by the U.S. Congress in 1887.

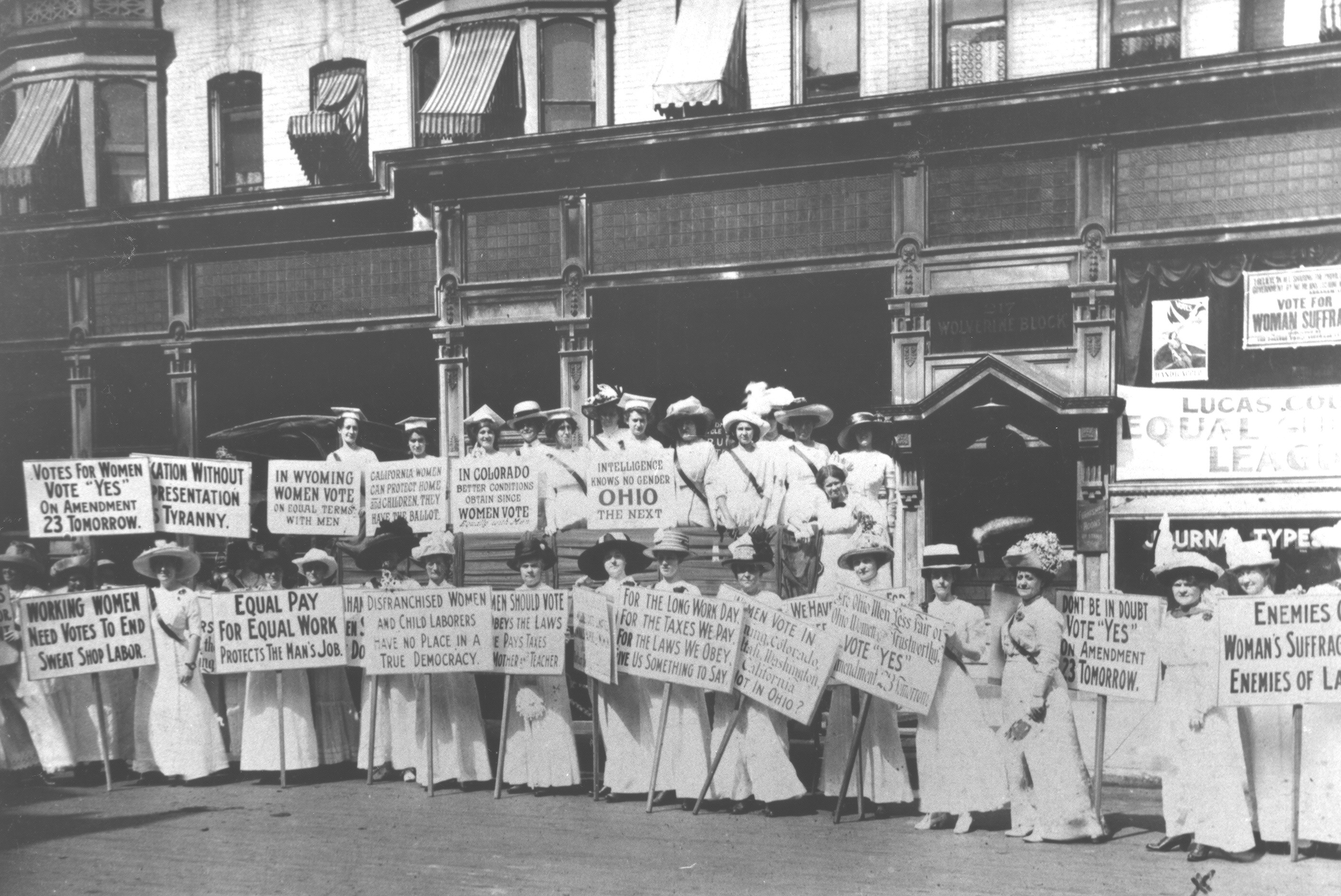
Toledo Woman Suffrage Association, Toledo, Ohio, 1912.

The push to grant Utah women's suffrage was at least partially fueled by the belief that, given the right to vote, Utah women would dispose of polygamy. In actuality, it was the men of the Church of Jesus Christ of Latter-day Saints that ultimately fought for women's enfranchisement to dispel myths that polygamy was akin to modern-day slavery. It was only after Utah women exercised their suffrage rights in favor of polygamy that the male-dominated U.S. Congress unilaterally disenfranchised Utah women.

By the end of the 19th century, Idaho, Utah, and Wyoming had enfranchised women after effort by the suffrage associations at the state level; Colorado notably enfranchised women by an 1893 referendum. California voted to enfranchise women in 1911.

During the beginning of the 20th century, as women's suffrage faced several important federal votes, a portion of the suffrage movement known as the National Woman's Party led by suffragist Alice Paul became the first "cause" to picket outside the White House. Paul had been mentored by Emeline Pankhurst while in England, and both she and Lucy Burns led a series of protests against the Wilson Administration in Washington.

Wilson ignored the protests for six months, but on June 20, 1917, as a Russian delegation drove up to the White House, suffragists unfurled a banner which stated: "We women of America tell you that America is not a democracy. Twenty million women are denied the right to vote. President Wilson is the chief opponent of their national enfranchisement". Another banner on August 14, 1917, referred to "Kaiser Wilson" and compared the plight of the German people with that of American women. With this manner of protest, the women were subject to arrests and many were jailed. Another ongoing tactic of the National Woman's Party was watchfires, which involved burning copies of President Wilson's speeches, often outside the White House or in the nearby Lafayette Park. The Party continued to hold watchfires even as the war began, drawing criticism from the public and even other suffrage groups for being unpatriotic. On October 17, Alice Paul was sentenced to seven months and on October 30 began a hunger strike, but after a few days prison authorities began to force feed her. After years of opposition, Wilson changed his position in 1918 to advocate women's suffrage as a war measure.

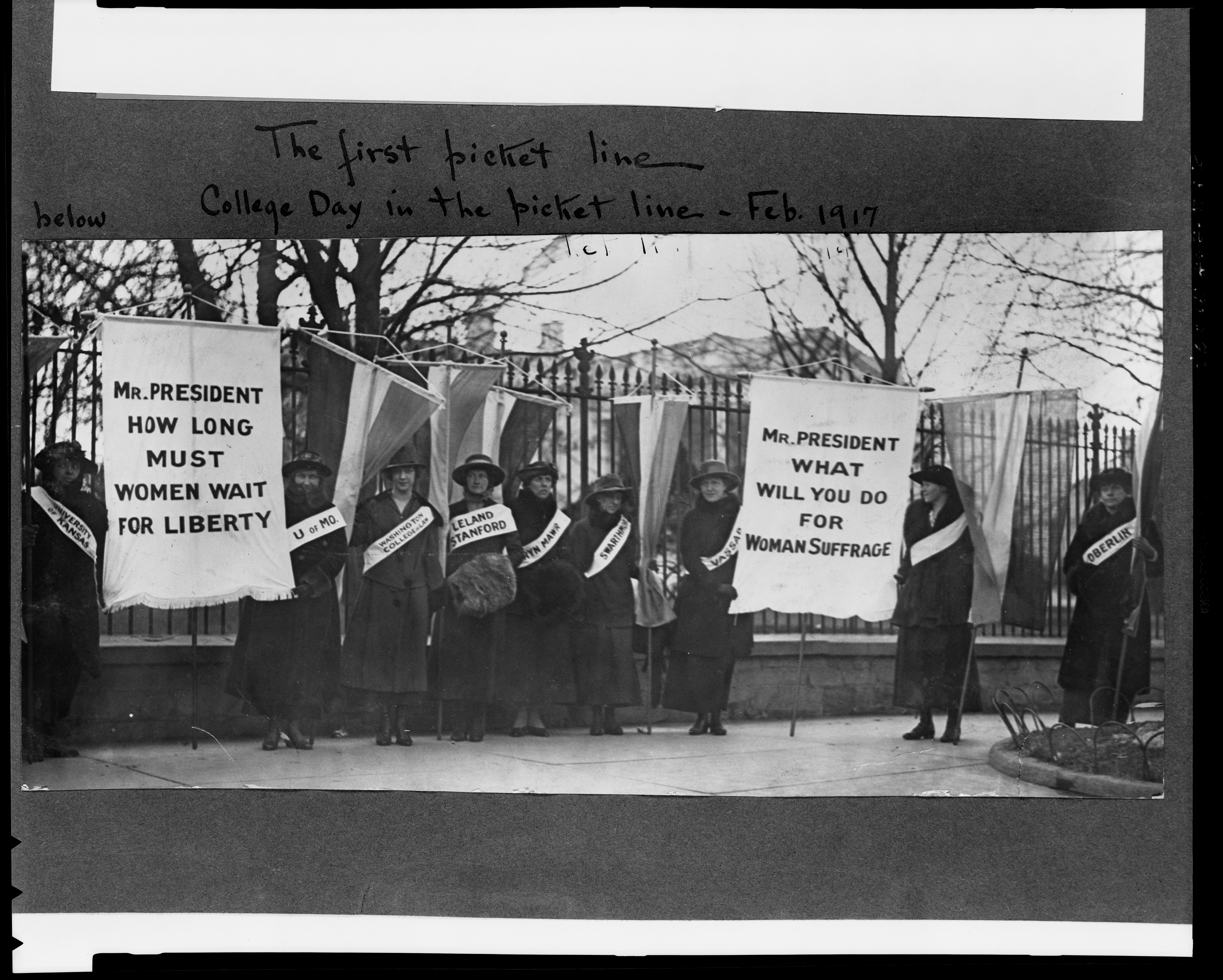
The Silent Sentinels, women suffragists picketing in front of the White House c. February 1917. Banner on the left reads, "Mr President, How long must women wait for Liberty?", and the banner to the right, "Mr President, What will you do for women's suffrage?"

The key vote came on June 4, 1919, when the Senate approved the amendment by 56 to 25 after four hours of debate, during which Democratic Senators opposed to the amendment filibustered to prevent a roll call until their absent Senators could be protected by pairs. The Ayes included 36 (82%) Republicans and 20 (54%) Democrats. The Nays were from 8 (18%) Republicans and 17 (46%) Democrats. The Nineteenth Amendment, which prohibited state or federal sex-based restrictions on voting, was ratified by sufficient states in 1920. According to the article, "Nineteenth Amendment", by Leslie Goldstein from the Encyclopedia of the Supreme Court of the United States, "by the end it also included jail sentences, and hunger strikes in jail accompanied by brutal force feedings; mob violence; and legislative votes so close that partisans were carried in on stretchers" (Goldstein, 2008). Even after the Nineteenth Amendment was ratified, women were still facing problems. For instance, when women had registered to vote in Maryland, "residents sued to have the women's names removed from the registry on the grounds that the amendment itself was unconstitutional" (Goldstein, 2008).

Before 1965, women of color, such as African Americans and Native Americans, were disenfranchised, especially in the South. The Voting Rights Act of 1965 prohibited racial discrimination in voting, and secured voting rights for racial minorities throughout the U.S.

=== Puerto Rico ===
On Puerto Rico, the organized struggle for women's suffrage on the American dependency of Puerto Rico begun when the United States introduced suffrage for males only via the Jones Act in 1917, and the Liga Femínea Puertorriqueña (from 1920 known as Liga Social Sufragista) was founded by Ana Roque de Duprey to campaign for voting rights to be extended also to women. When women's suffrage was introduced in the US in 1920, the suffragists on Puerto Rico stated that this reform should apply to Puerto Rico as well, and sued under the leadership of Milagros Benet de Mewton for this purpose. Women's suffrage was extended to Puerto Rico in 1929, but only for literate women; full women's suffrage was introduced by the US on Puerto Rico first in 1932.

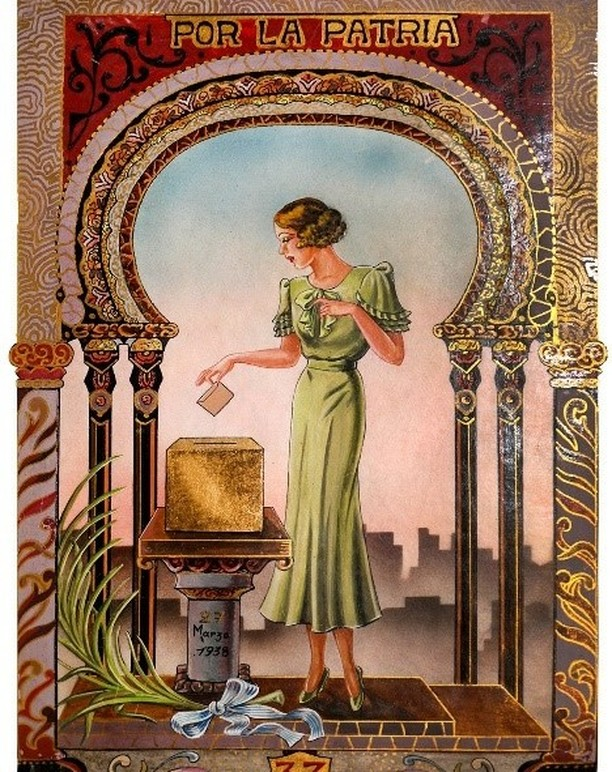
Commemorative poster of the 1938 Uruguayan general election.

=== Uruguay ===
Women's suffrage was announced as a principle in the Constitution of Uruguay of 1917, and declared as law in a decree of 1932. The first national election in which women voted was the 1938 Uruguayan general election.

Nevertheless, the first time that women were able to vote was in the 1927 Cerro Chato referendum.

=== Venezuela ===
After the 1928 Student Protests, women started participating more actively in politics. In 1935, women's rights supporters founded the Feminine Cultural Group (known as 'ACF' from its initials in Spanish), with the goal of tackling women's problems. The group supported women's political and social rights, and believed it was necessary to involve and inform women about these issues to ensure their personal development. It went on to give seminars, as well as founding night schools and the House of Laboring Women.

Groups looking to reform the 1936 Civil Code of Conduct in conjunction with the Venezuelan representation to the Union of American Women called the First Feminine Venezuelan Congress in 1940. In this congress, delegates discussed the situation of women in Venezuela and their demands. Key goals were women's suffrage and a reform to the Civil Code of Conduct. Around twelve thousand signatures were collected and handed to the Venezuelan Congress, which reformed the Civil Code of Conduct in 1942.

In 1944, groups supporting women's suffrage, the most important being Feminine Action, organized around the country. During 1945, women attained the right to vote at a municipal level. This was followed by a stronger call of action. Feminine Action began editing a newspaper called the Correo Cívico Femenino, to connect, inform and orientate Venezuelan women in their struggle. Finally, after the 1945 Venezuelan coup d'état and the call for a new Constitution, to which women were elected, women's suffrage became a constitutional right in the country.

== In non-religious organizations ==
The right of women to vote has sometimes been denied in non-religious organizations; for example, it was not until 1964 that women in the National Association of the Deaf in the United States were first allowed to vote.
