= Women in Finland =

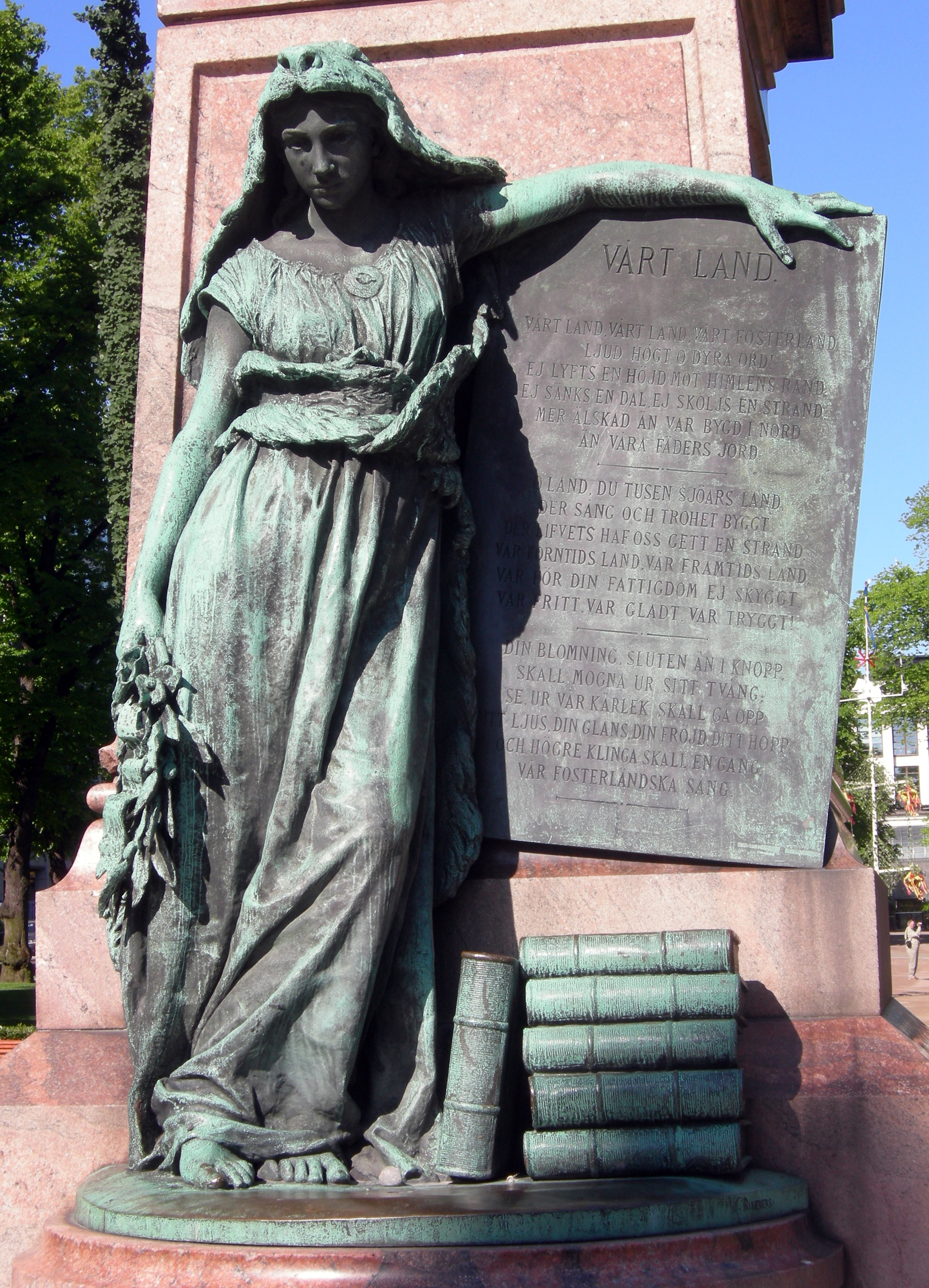
- An 1885 statue of the Finnish maiden leaning on a tablet with the lyrics of the National Anthem of Finland, Walter Runeberg, sculptor.

Gender Inequality Index (2022)
- Value: 0.860
- Rank: 2nd out of 146

Global Gender Gap Index (2023)
- Value: 0.863
- Rank: 3rd out of 146

Women in Finland has a strong overall history of promoting gender equality. In 1906, the women of Finland became the first women in Europe to be granted the right to vote. That year, Finland also became the first country to grant women the right to run for office. Many women in Finland hold prominent positions in Finnish society, in the academics, in the field of business, and in the government of Finland. As of 2024, 47% of the members of the Finnish Parliament were women, and 60% of government ministers — the highest rate of political engagement in the European Union. Tarja Halonen became the first female president of the country after serving as Foreign Minister of Finland.

In religion, where most of the Finnish people are members of the Evangelical Lutheran Church of Finland (the other major Christian denomination in Finland is the Eastern Orthodox Church), women can be ordained as priests.

In terms of finance, Finnish women have been described as "usually independent financially". The Telegraph wrote in 2006:

Finnish women are much more outgoing and approachable than the men and often command three or four languages. Their position in society and business is well-respected and superior to that of women in most other cultures.

== Location ==
Finland is bordered on the east by Russia, on the south by the Gulf of Finland and Estonia, and on the west by the Gulf of Bothnia and Sweden, and on the north/north west by Norway. One quarter of the territory is north of the Arctic Circle.

== Population ==
=== By gender (2020) ===
- Total population: 5,533,793
  - Men population: 2,733,808
  - Women population: 2,799,985

=== Life expectancy (2020) ===
- Life expectancy in years for total population: 81.82
  - Male: 79.03 years
  - Female: 84.62 years

== Women's rights movement ==
In the mid 19th-century, Minna Canth first started to address feminist issues in public debate, such as women's education and sexual double standards. The Finnish women's movement organized with the foundation of the Suomen Naisyhdistys in 1884, which was the first feminist women's organisation in Finland. This represented the first wave feminism. The Suomen Naisyhdistys was split into the Naisasialiitto Unioni (1892) and the Suomalainen naisliitto (1907), and all women's organisations were united under the umbrella organisation Naisjärjestöjen Keskusliitto in 1911.

Women were granted their basic equal rights early on with the suffrage in 1906. After the introduction of women's suffrage, the women's movement was mainly channelled through the women's branches of the political parties. The new marriage law of 1929, Avioliittolaki, finally established complete equality for married women, and after this, women were legally equal to men by law in Finland.

In the 1960s, feminism again became a part of debate in Finland after the publication of Anna-Liisa Sysiharjun's Home, Equality and Work (1960) and Elina Haavio-Mannilan's Suomalainen nainen ja mies (1968), and the student feminist group Yhdistys 9 (1966–1970) addressed issues such as the need for free abortions.

In 1970 there was a brief but strong women's movement belonging to second wave feminism. Rape in marriage was not considered a crime at the time, and victims of domestic violence had few places to go. Feminists also fought for a day-care system that would be open to the public, and for the right for not only paid maternity leave but also paternity leave. Today there is a 263-day parental leave in Finland. It is illegal to discriminate against women in the workforce. Two feminist groups were created to help the movement: The Marxist-Feminists (Marxist-Feministerna) and The Red Women (Rödkäringarna, Puna-akat). The feminists in Finland were inspired by other European countries such as Sweden and Switzerland. Other important groups for the Finnish women in the 1970s include Unioni and The Feminists (Feministit-Feministerna).

=== Women's suffrage ===
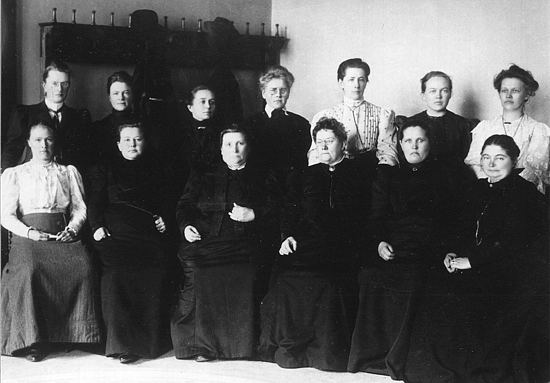
13 of the total of 19 female MPs, who were the first female MPs in the world, elected in Finland's parliamentary elections in 1907.

The area that in 1809 became Finland was a group of integral provinces of the Kingdom of Sweden for over 600 years, signifying that also women in Finland were allowed to vote during the Swedish Age of Liberty (1718–1772), when suffrage was granted to tax-paying female members of guilds.

The predecessor state of modern Finland, the Grand Duchy of Finland was part of the Russian Empire from 1809 to 1917 and enjoyed a high degree of autonomy. In 1863 taxpaying women were granted municipal suffrage in the countryside, and in 1872, the same reform was given to the cities.

The issue of women's suffrage was first raised by the women's movement when it organized in the Finnish Women's Association (1884), and the first organization exclusively devoted to the issue of suffrage was Naisasialiitto Unioni (1892).

The Parliament Act in 1906 established the unicameral parliament of Finland and both women and men were given the right to vote and stand for election. Thus Finnish women became the first in Europe to have unrestricted rights both to vote and to stand for parliament (New Zealand and Australia having achieved this in the preceding decade, albeit with restrictions on Australia's Indigenous people). In elections the next year, 19 female MPs, first ones in the world, were elected and women have continued to play a central role in the nation's politics ever since. In 1907 the first general election in Finland that had been open to women took place. Nineteen women were elected which was less than 10% of the total members of parliament. The successful women included Lucina Hagman, Miina Sillanpää, Anni Huotari, Hilja Pärssinen, Hedvig Gebhard, Ida Aalle, Mimmi Kanervo, Eveliina Ala-Kulju, Hilda Käkikoski, Liisi Kivioja, Sandra Lehtinen, Dagmar Neovius, Maria Raunio, Alexandra Gripenberg, Iida Vemmelpuu, Maria Laine, Jenny Nuotio and Hilma Räsänen. Many had expected more. A few women realised that the women of Finland needed to seize this opportunity and organisation and education would be required. Newly elected MPs Lucina Hagman and Maikki Friberg together with Olga Oinola, Aldyth Hultin, Mathilda von Troil, Ellinor Ingman-Ivalo, Sofia Streng and Olga Österberg founded the Finnish Women's Association's first branch in Helsinki. Miina Sillanpää became Finland's first female government minister in 1926.

Finland's first female president Tarja Halonen was voted into office in 2000 and for a second term in 2006. In 2003 Anneli Jäätteenmäki became the first female prime minister of Finland, and in 2007 Matti Vanhanen's second cabinet made history as for the first time there were more women than men in the cabinet of Finland (12 vs. 8).. In the 2019 Finnish parliamentary election, 94 out 200 elected MPs (47%) were women. In the Marin Cabinet, 12 out of 19 appointed ministers (63%) were women.

As of 2022, there have been three female prime ministers;

- Anneli Jäätteenmäki (2003)
- Mari Kiviniemi (2010–2011)
- Sanna Marin (2019–2023)

As of 2024, women's representation in Parliament stands at 47%.

=== Women's rights ===
Finland became one of the first countries to grant women the right to vote, and still today it is among the top countries for women equality. In 2022, it ranked second in the world in the Global Gender Gap Report. In 2024, it ranked eighth in the EU Gender Equality Index.

Finland made marital rape illegal in 1994. In 2003 the government of Finland proposed addressing issues with gender inequality. They planned to promote gender equality over the entire public administration, reform the Act on Equality (tasa-arvolaki) that the men and women in Finland share, promote equal pay for work of equal value, increase the number of women in political and economic roles, assessing gender equality from the male point of view, prevent domestic violence and intimate partner violence, protect victims of trafficking and the possibility of criminalizing buying sex. This act is called the Government Action Plan for Gender Equality (hallituksen tasa-arvo-ohjelma) and it included more than 100 issues that needed discussion.

== Education ==
=== In history ===
In the late 18th century and early 19th century private schools for girls were established in Finland, among the more known being those of Christina Krook, Anna Salmberg and Sara Wacklin. These schools were criticized for its shallow education of accomplishments, which resulted in the decision that girls should be included in the school reform of 1843, and the following year, two Swedish-language state secondary schools for girls was founded in Turku and Helsinki, Svenska fruntimmersskolan i Åbo and Svenska fruntimmersskolan i Helsingfors. This led to the establishment of a net of girl schools of a similar kind in Finland. At first the schools were reserved for girls from upper-class families.

At this time it was not possible for the girls to pass the baccalaureate and move on to university studies. In 1865 a grammar school made it clear that only girls whose upbringing and manners were impeccable and whose company cannot be considered detrimental to others, and who were from "respectable" families could be in the school.

After the first woman in Finland, Maria Tschetschulin, was accepted as a university student by dispensation in 1870, advanced classes and colleges classes were included in many girl schools to prepare students for university (by means of dispensation), and in 1872, the demand that all students must be members of the Swedish language upper classes was dropped. Women were given the right to teach in grammar schools for girls in 1882.

When the dispensation for female university students was dropped and women were accepted at the same terms as men in 1915, girls and boys started to receive the same education in the school system, and the girl schools in Finland started to be changed to same sex education, a development which was completed in the 1970s.

=== Today ===
Finland students start their schooling a year after a lot of other countries. In spite of this, Finland is now one of the top-performing countries in mathematical skills, but also one of the few whose girls normally outperform boys. While in most countries the most able girls lag behind the most able boys in mathematics performance, according to the PISA 2012 Results Overview, the OECD gender score difference in mathematics, reading, and science was a result of -6 (boys - girls) in Finland. Additionally, while the highest-performing students of problem solving in the world are largely males, in Finland, the proportion of top-performing females is about the same as the proportion of top-performing males. This is also true among the Survey of Adult Skills (PIAAC) where the top-performers in problem solving are predominantly men, except for in Finland, Australia and Canada.

As for Finland's educational benefits for students, Finnish schools offer state-funded schooling which makes it easier for women and men to go to work after being on parental leave. Women represent 32% of students studying in mathematics and computer science.

== Women in the workforce ==
According to the Finnish Labor Force Survey around 32% of the 301,000 people who are self-employed are women. Women first became involved in labor markets through agrarian societies. Even before the public daycare systems, the number of women in the workforce was still very high, over 50%. The percent of workers in the labor force that are female (ages 15–74) is 51%, where for men it is 49%. 32% of the women are involved in entrepreneurship.

In 2021, the hours that Finns spent on work (meaning paid work and domestic work combined) were the same for women and men for the first time, according to Statistics Finland. Previously women had spent more time on work than men.

=== Equality in the workforce ===
Employers who have at least 30 employees must have a gender equality plan that includes a women's and men's pay comparison. The Ministry of Social Affairs and Health and other important labor market organizations set guidelines for gender equality planning.

== Women in the military ==
Military service is required for all mentally and physically capable men in Finland, but is voluntary for women. Women who enlist are allowed to train for combat roles. Finland is one of 16 other countries in the world that permit women in front-line combat positions.

== Recreation ==
In using the sauna, women bathe separately from men, except if they are with family members or friends.

== See also ==
- Demographics of Finland
- Women in Europe
