= Olga Oinola =

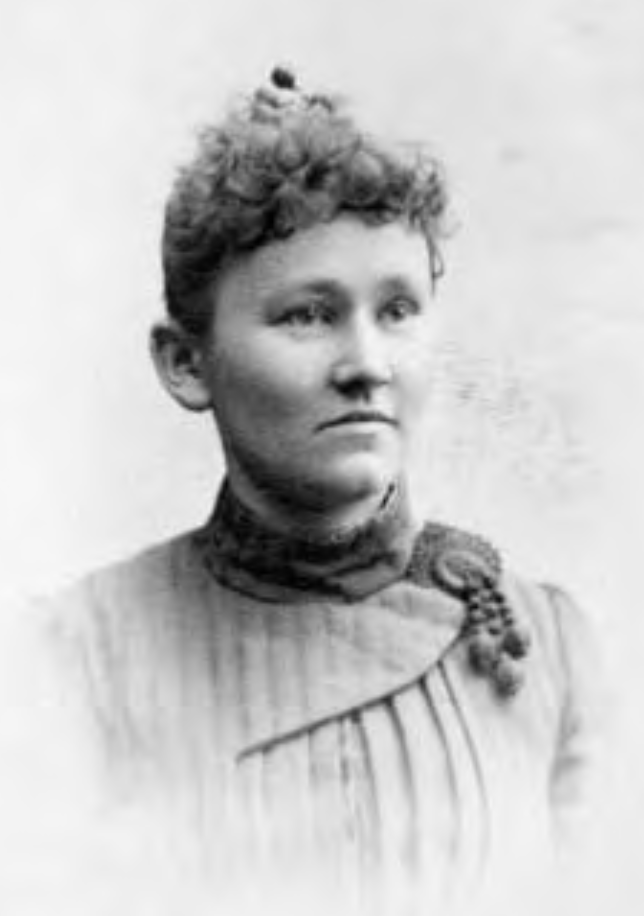
- Born: 2 July 1865; Leppävirta
- Died: 6 November 1949 (aged 84)
- Employer: Finnish Comprehensive School in Helsinki

Olga Adele Oinola born Olga Adele Johansson (2 July 1865 – 6 November 1949) was a Finn who became President of the Finnish Women Association.

== Life ==
Oinola was born in Leppävirta in 1865. Oinola completed girls' school in 1879 and she completed her graduate education in 1887. The following year she began to teach at the Finnish Comprehensive School in Helsinki she held this position until 1930 although from 1905 for 18 years she taught at the Vocational School for Girls in Native Language. In parallel she continued her education with a trip to Germany in 1911 and 1913.

In 1907 the first general election in Finland that had been open to women took place. Nineteen women were elected which was less than 10% of the total members of parliament. The successful women included Lucina Hagman, Miina Sillanpää, Anni Huotari, Hilja Pärssinen, Hedvig Gebhard, Ida Aalle, Mimmi Kanervo, Eveliina Ala-Kulju, Hilda Käkikoski, Liisi Kivioja, Sandra Lehtinen, Dagmar Neovius, Maria Raunio, Alexandra Gripenberg, Iida Vemmelpuu, Maria Laine, Jenny Nuotio and Hilma Räsänen. Many had expected more. Oinola was amongst a few women who realised that the women of Finland needed to seize this opportunity and organisation and education would be required. Newly elected MPs Lucina Hagman and Maikki Friberg together with Aldyth Hultin, Mathilda von Troil, Ellinor Ingman-Ivalo, Sofia Streng and Olga Österberg founded the Finnish Women's Association's first branch in Helsinki. She was to be the third chair of the organisation succeeding Lucina Hagman in 1919 and continuing until the following year. She would return to the role again in 1931 and serve till 1936.

Oinola's focused her efforts outside her work on temperance and women's issues. She was a talented speaker with a broad knowledge of the issues. She weighed into contentious issues like women doing night work. Some argued that women should have an equal opportunity to work at night whereas others argues that mothers should not abandon their children at night. Another contentious issue was unmarried mothers who face a lot of recrimination. The women MPs were split over the proposal for the government to supply refuges for these mothers. In Finland the children of unmarried mothers were auctioned up until the 1920s.

Oinola also she sat on the Poverty Treatment Board until 1936. Her other positions included being on the Central Board of the Finnish Women's Federation 1907-1949 serving as the Chair from 1913 to 1921 and later a shorter service from 1932 to 1934. Vice Chairman of the Women's Fitness Centre 1921–1939, Chairman of the Women's Teachers' Association in 1913.
