= Lucina Hagman =

Finnish civil activist

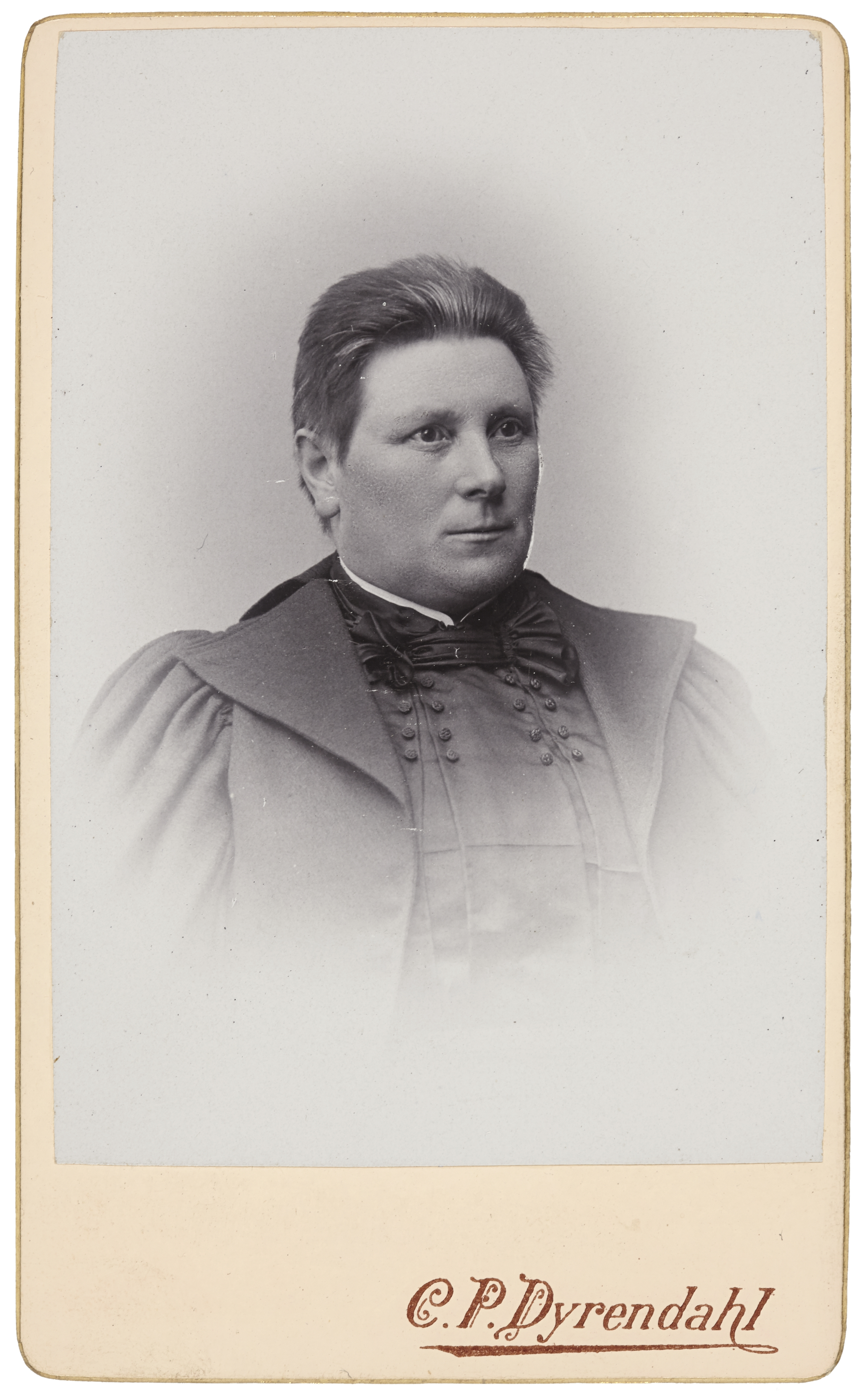
- Born: 5 June 1853; Kälviä
- Died: 6 September 1946 (aged 93); Helsinki
- Parent(s): Nils Johan Erik Hagman and Margareta Sofia Nordman
- Relatives: Sofia Hagman (sister), Tycho Hagman (brother)

Lucina Hagman (5 June 1853, Kälviä – 6 September 1946, Helsinki) was an early Finnish feminist and among the first female MPs in the world due to the 1907 Finnish parliamentary election.

== Life and career ==
Hagman was the daughter of police master Nils Johan Erik Hagman and Margareta Sofia Nordman, a police chief in rural Kälviä. She was the sister of the educator Sofia Hagman and writer Tycho Hagman. She became a teacher, and Jean Sibelius might be the most famous individual to study at her school.

She became active in women's causes, serving in Parliament from 1907 to 1917. Of the 200 MPs elected in 1907, just 19 were women. The successful women included Hagman, Miina Sillanpää, Anni Huotari, Hilja Pärssinen, Hedvig Gebhard, Ida Aalle, Mimmi Kanervo, Eveliina Ala-Kulju, Hilda Käkikoski, Liisi Kivioja, Sandra Lehtinen, Dagmar Neovius, Maria Raunio, Alexandra Gripenberg, Iida Vemmelpuu, Maria Laine, Jenny Nuotio, and Hilma Räsänen.

Lucina Hagman also founded the Martha organisation, the Suomalainen naisliitto, served as the first chair of Unioni, The League of Finnish Feminists, and was active in the peace movement. She also wrote a biography of Fredrika Bremer.

== Publications ==
- Ensimmäinen koulu (1882)
- Fredrika Bremer. Kuvaus vuosisatamme alkupuolelta (1886)
- Naisten kasvatuksesta(1888)
- Om qvinnouppfostran (1888)
- Naisten äänestysoikeudesta (1889)
- Kokemukseni yhteiskasvatuksesta (1897)
- Kasvatus rakkauteen (1900)
- Uppfostran till kärlek (1901)
- Minna Canthin elämäkerta. 1 (1906)
- Naisten ohjelma lähestyviä vaaleja varten (1906)
- Kvinnornas program vid de stundande valen (1906)
- Minna Canthin elämäkerta. 2 (1911)
- Lucina Hagman kertoo lapsuudestaan Kälviältä 1853-1865 (1936)
- Suomalainen yhteiskoulu Helsingissä (1897)
- Koulun lukukirja (1891)

== See also ==
- List of peace activists
