= 1907 Finnish parliamentary election =

- 15–16 March 1907

All 200 seats in the Parliament of Finland 101 seats needed for a majority
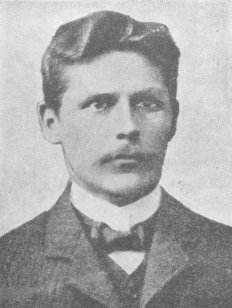

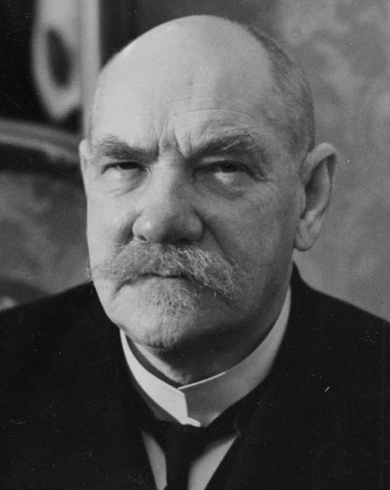

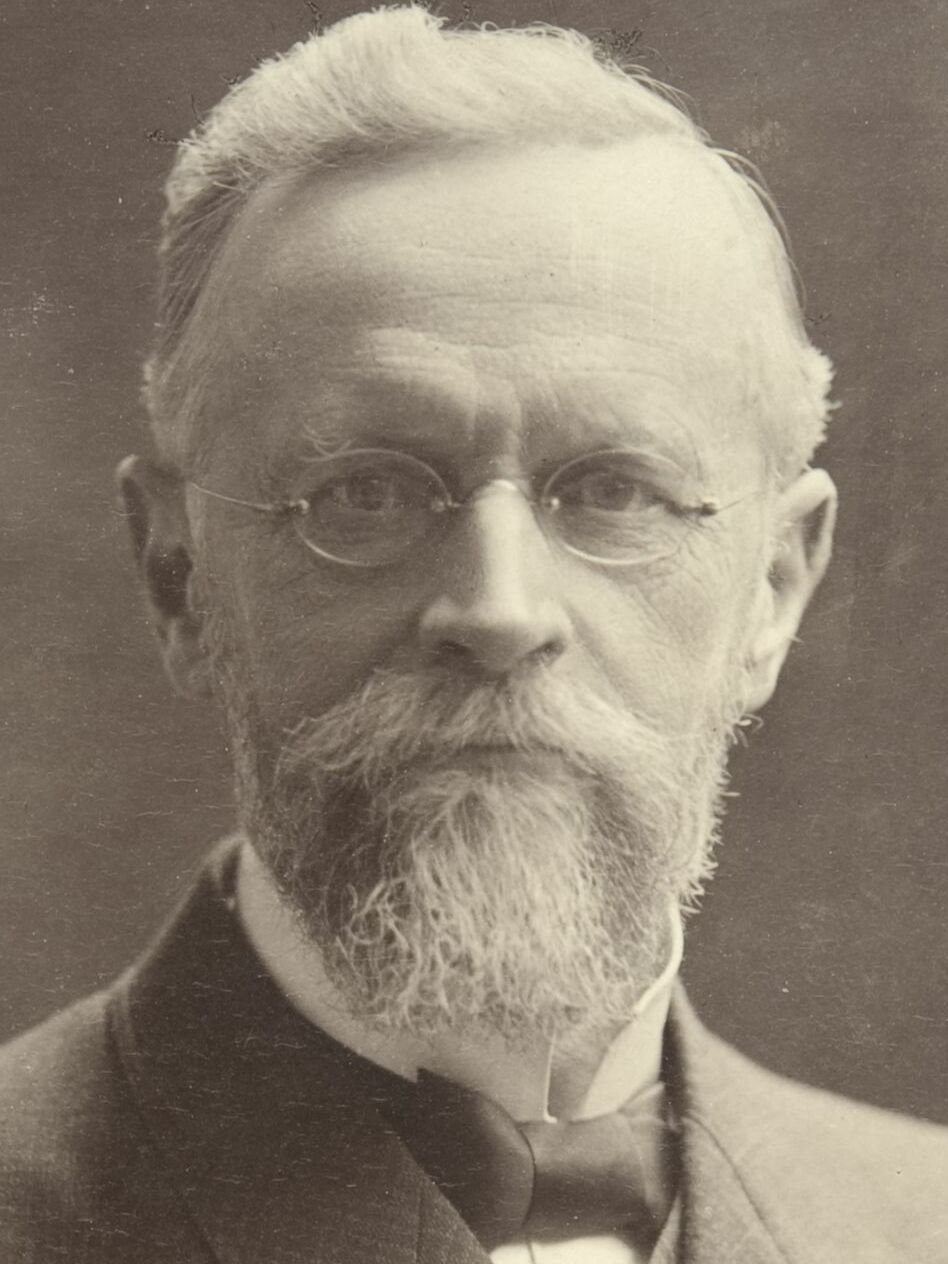

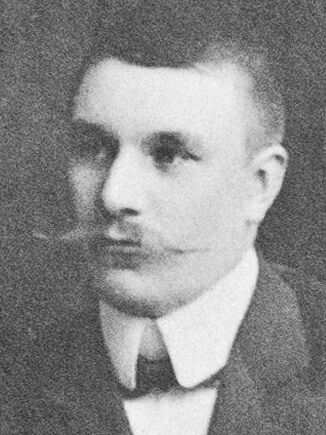

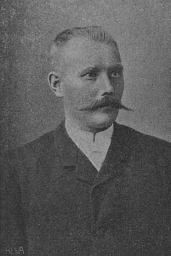
	First party	Second party	Third party
Leader	Edvard Valpas-Hänninen		Pehr Evind Svinhufvud
Party	SDP	Finnish	Young Finnish
Seats won	80	59	26
Popular vote	329,946	243,573	121,604
Percentage	37.03%	27.34%	13.65%
	Fourth party	Fifth party	Sixth party
Leader	Axel Lille	Otto Karhi	Antti Kaarne
Party	RKP	Agrarian	SKrTL
Seats won	24	9	2
Popular vote	112,267	51,242	13,790
Percentage	12.60%	5.75%	1.55%

Parliamentary elections were held in the Grand Duchy of Finland on 15 and 16 March 1907. They were the first parliamentary election in which members were elected to the new Parliament of Finland by universal suffrage and the first in the world in which female members were elected.

One journal at the time described the new parliament as being the most "Advanced" “Body of Legislators in the World Outside of New Zealand.”

== Background ==
The election followed the parliamentary reform of 1906 which replaced the Diet of Finland, which was based on the Estates and had its institutional roots in the period of Swedish reign, with a modern unicameral parliament of 200 MPs. The reform was agreed upon after a general strike in Finland in 1905 during which demands for a parliamentary reform arose especially among the Socialists. This coincided with similar development in Russia which too saw a general strike and, after the Russo-Japanese War, the birth of a new institution, the Duma. This background explains why Emperor Nicholas II of Russia allowed parliamentary reform in Finland.

All political factions of Finland reached an agreement on the reform and the first elections were set for 1907. The 1906 reform ended the first period of attempted Russification in the Grand Duchy of Finland which had begun in 1899 and seen such dramatic episodes as the assassination of Nikolai Bobrikov, the Governor-General of Finland, in 1904.

Before the election of 1907 the legislative power in the Grand Duchy had been vested in the Diet of the Estates, an age old institution of four Estates (the nobility, the clergy, the burghers and the peasants) deriving from the period of Swedish rule and representing only a small portion of the people. This kind of institution had become quite ancient by the early years of the 20th century. The new unicameral parliament was to have 200 MPs, all elected by universal and equal suffrage of citizens over 24 years of age. Women as well were allowed to vote and stand for election; Finnish women were the first in Europe to receive these rights. Previously only New Zealand and South Australia had approved universal female suffrage, and Finland was the second to grant women the right to stand as candidates.

== Electoral system ==
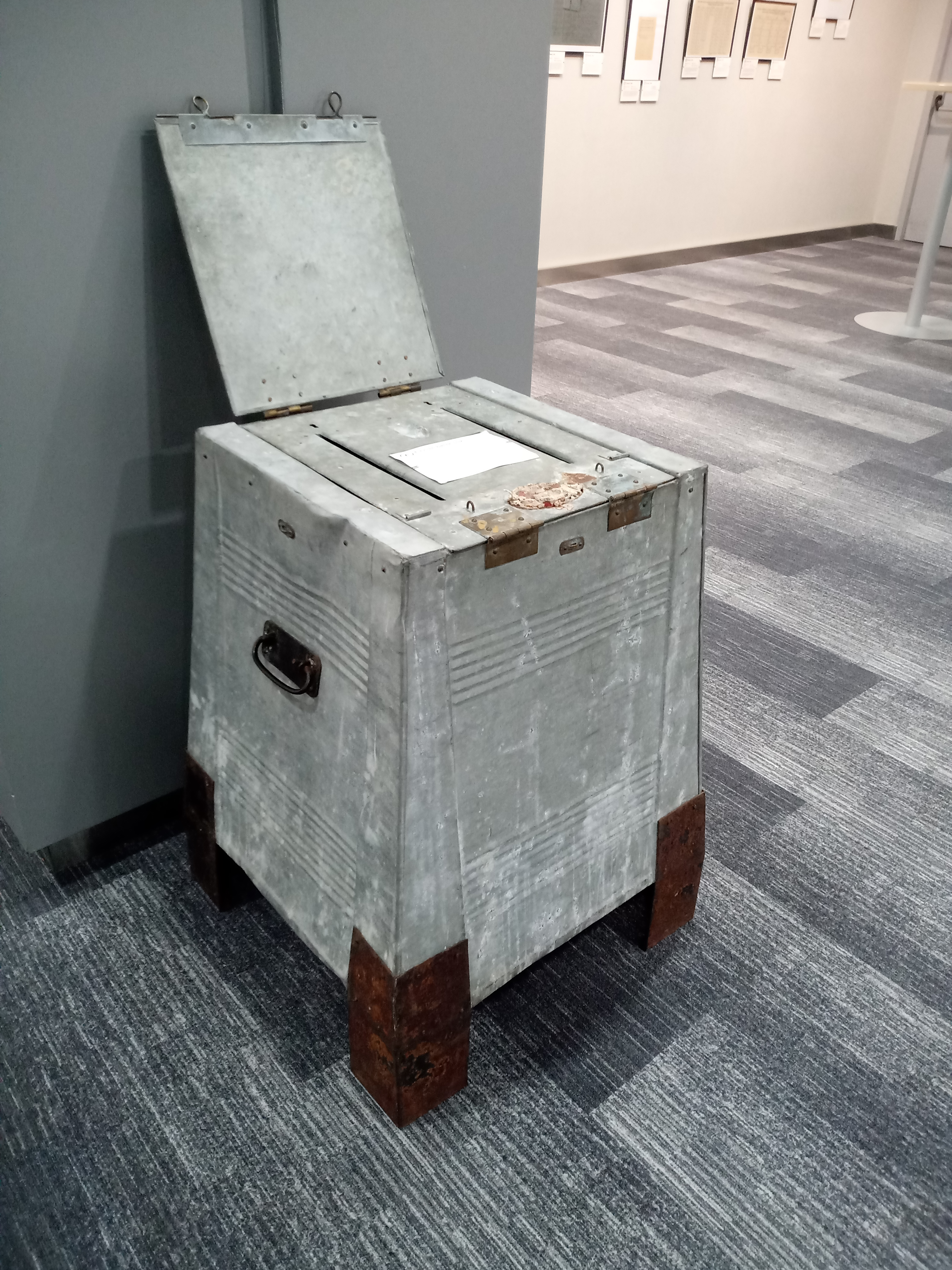
Ballot box used in 1907 election

The voting system was designed to allow voters the choice between a simple list vote and expressing more particular preferences. A voter could vote for a party list of candidates by marking it with a red line. Alternatively, the voter could rank up to three names from among the candidates on any list in order of preference. Even further, a voter could vote for up to three persons from outside the lists by entering their names. The D'Hondt method was used to allocate seats after the list votes, preference votes and off-list votes were put together according to a somewhat complex procedure.

== Campaign ==
The language strife of Finland was an important issue in the late 19th and early 20th century Finnish politics. Thus the first political parties of Finland, the Finnish Party and the Swedish Party, were born respectively around Fennoman and Svecoman ideas. A Liberal party was founded but soon also dissolved. The Finnish party was later split into the supporters of the "Old Finns," and the "Young Finns" who founded a party of their own. An even more important event was the founding of a Socialist party in 1899. First called the Finnish Labour Party, it adopted the name Social Democratic Party of Finland in 1903 and sought the support of the urban working class and the rural landless population. Universal suffrage was naturally very important for these groups since they had no political power in the Diet of the Estates. In 1906 the Agrarian League was founded to represent the interests of peasants and in the same year the Swedish Party adopted its present name, the Swedish People's Party. The topics of the campaign into the election touched for example social issues and the parties' stances to the Russification attempts.

== Results ==
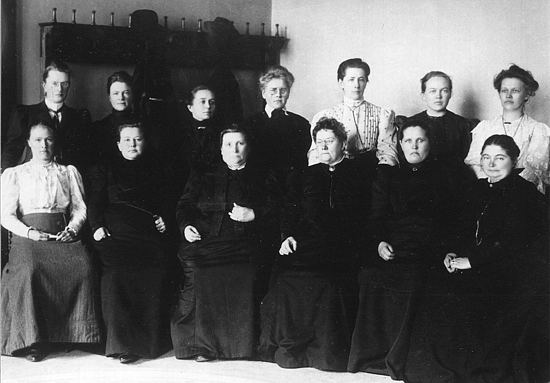
13 of 19 female MPs – the first female legislators in the world – elected in 1907.

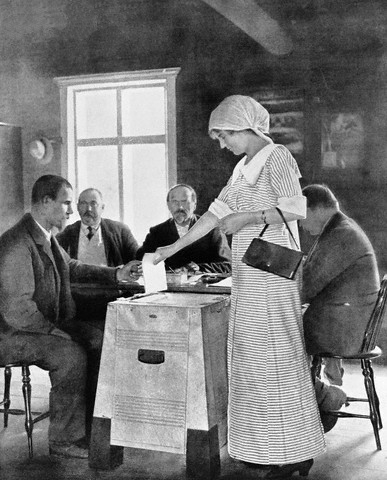
Finnish woman voting in the elections

The results of the first parliamentary election in Finnish history were somewhat a surprise for the traditional parties; the Social Democrats emerged as clear winners, winning 80 of the 200 seats, making them the largest faction in Parliament. Of the right-wing or centre-right parties the Finnish Party gained the most seats with 59, followed by the Young Finnish Party with 26 and the Swedish People's Party with 24. The Agrarian League won only nine seats but in the following years its support grew rapidly.

As a result of the election the representatives of workers and the landless people (the Social Democrats) became the largest group in the parliament, whereas previously they had no political representation whatsoever in the legislative body.

Women too gained representation; 19 female MPs were elected. They became the first female MPs in the world. They included Lucina Hagman, Miina Sillanpää, Anni Huotari, Hilja Pärssinen, Hedvig Gebhard, Ida Aalle-Teljo, Mimmi Kanervo, Eveliina Ala-Kulju, Hilda Käkikoski, Liisi Kivioja, Sandra Lehtinen, Dagmar Neovius, Maria Raunio, Alexandra Gripenberg, Iida Vemmelpuu, Maria Laine, Jenny Upari and Hilma Räsänen. Many had expected more. A few women realised that the women of Finland needed to seize this opportunity and organisation and education would be required. Newly elected MPs Lucina Hagman and Maikki Friberg together with Olga Oinola, Aldyth Hultin, Mathilda von Troil, Ellinor Ingman-Ivalo, Sofia Streng and Olga Österberg founded the Finnish Women's Association's first branch in Helsinki.

Party	Votes	%	Seats
Social Democratic Party	329,946	37.03	80
Finnish Party	243,573	27.34	59
Young Finnish Party	121,604	13.65	26
Swedish People's Party	112,267	12.60	24
Agrarian League	51,242	5.75	9
Christian Workers' Union	13,790	1.55	2
Others	18,568	2.08	0
Total	890,990	100.00	200
Valid votes	890,990	99.07	
Invalid/blank votes	8,357	0.93	
Total votes	899,347	100.00	
Registered voters/turnout	1,272,873	70.65	
Source: Mackie & Rose

== Aftermath ==
The joy of the Social Democrats over their victory proved to be short lasting. The second period of attempted Russification in the Grand Duchy of Finland began the following year and the Russian Emperor dissolved the Parliament of Finland on numerous occasions in 1908–1917. During World War I the parliament did not convene for a long time. Thus the Social Democrats were not able to push through most of their desired reforms during these final years of the period of Finland's autonomy, despite being able to keep their position as the largest party in all elections of this period. As a result, many Socialist supporters lost their initially high hopes for the parliament elected by universal suffrage. This in turn was one factor among others in the development which led to the Finnish Civil War in 1918.

The 100th anniversary of the first Finnish Parliament was selected as the main motif for a high value commemorative coin, the €2 100th Anniversary of the Finnish Parliamentary commemorative coin, minted in 2006. The obverse shows the silhouette of a woman's and a man's hands, and below the hands ballots being inserted in a ballot-box. On the reverse, two stylized faces in the centre part, one male and the other female, separated by a thin curved line is depicted. They symbolize the equality of genders, as does the fact that the pictorial subjects on both sides are equal in respect to the centre of the coin.

== See also ==
- Democracy in Europe
