= Armi Hallstén-Kallia =

Finnish leader of women's organizations

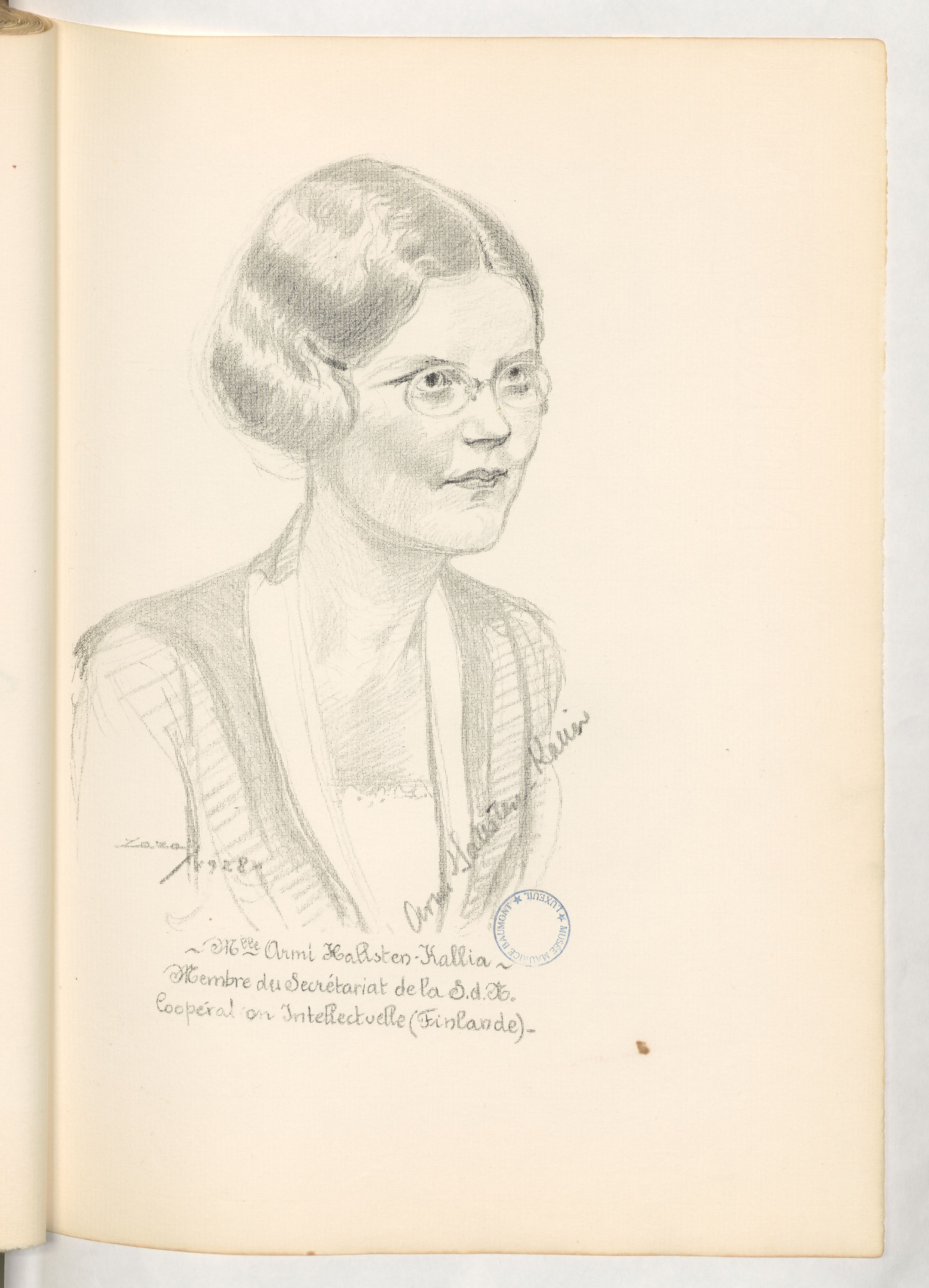
Portrait by Oscar Lazar, 1928

Armi Hallstén-Kallia (1897-1956) was a Finnish feminist. She was the head of the Finnish Women's Association in 1937–1955.

Hallstén-Kallia was born to politicians Onni Hallstén and Ilmi Hallstén.

She took a Master's degree in 1923. She worked as a secretary in the Finnish Red Cross and at the League of Nations in 1926–1936. In 1937, she was elected as her mother's successor as president of the Finnish Women's Association. She was also president of the Karelian Association of Academic Women in 1939–1942.
