= Nutid =

Women's magazine in Finland (1895–1917

- Categories: Feminist magazine; Women's magazine
- Founded: 1895
- First issue: January 1895
- Final issue: May 1917
- Country: Finland
- Based in: Helsinki
- Language: Swedish

Nutid was a Swedish-language women's magazine published in Helsinki, Finland, between 1895 and 1917 with some interruptions. Its subtitle was Tidskrift för sammhällsfrågor och Hemmets Intressen.

== History and profile ==
Nutid was first published in January 1895. It was started by the Swedish faction of the Naisasialiitto Unioni, and Jenny af Forselles was among the founders of the magazine. Helena Westermarck served as the editor-in-chief of Nutid. Then, Jenny af Forselles and Dagmar Neovius held the post from 1909 to 1915. Maikki Friberg was among its contributors.

Nutid ceased publication in March 1915. A single issue of the magazine appeared in May 1917.

The issues of Nutid were archived by the National Library of Finland.
