= Hallsten =

Hallsten, Hällsten, Hällstén is a Swedish surname. Notable people with the surname include:

- Ilmi Hallsten (1862–1936), Finnish teacher and politician, wife of Onni
- Onni Hallsten (1858–1937), Finnish teacher, civil servant, and politician

== See also ==
- Hellsten
