= Heidi Lindén =

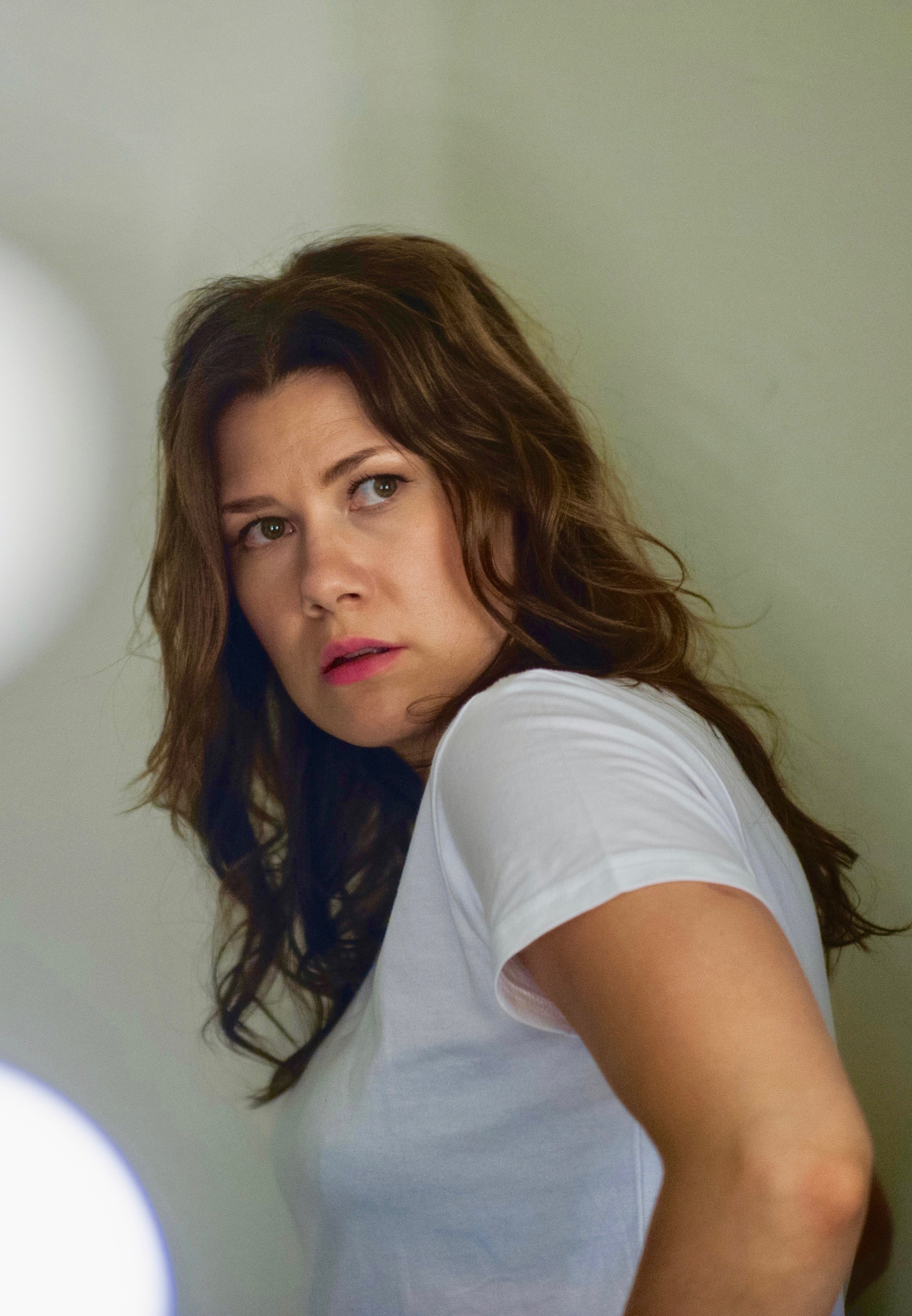
- Born: 1984; Helsinki
- Occupation: Actor, film director, film producer, screenwriter
- Website: www.heidilinden.com

Heidi Lindén (born 1984) is a Finnish film director, producer, writer, and funding and development strategist. She is the founder of ACM Partners, an internationally operating development and strategy agency.

== Career ==
Lindén began her career in talent management and advertising. She was a founder and shareholder of agencies such as Avenue A Agency, and has worked at advertising and communications agencies including Miltton, Hasan & Partners, Also Starring, and Lucy Loves Stories. She has also acted as a strategic consultant for commercial channels like MTV3.

Lindén has also appeared in several domestic productions and has been recognized as a producer in international news outlets. She has lived and worked in Los Angeles, New York City, and Helsinki.

== ACM Partners ==
In 2011 Lindén founded ACM Partners, an international development and strategy agency with offices in Helsinki, Stockholm ja New York. The agency has executed projects in multiple countries, producing television series, films, and advertising campaigns.

== Publications and Social Impact ==
Lindén has collected stories of Finnish women facing sexual harassment in the Finnish film industry and published them as a book called #Metoo-vallankumous: Miten hiljaisuus rikottiin? ('#MeToo Revolution: How the Silence was Broken').

== Awards and recognition ==
In 2018 Lindén received the Gender Equality Award (Finnish: Lyyti of the Year) by the Naisasialiitto Unioni for her work promoting equality and transparency in the film and creative industries.

== Bibliography ==
- Lindén, Heidi; et al. (2018). #Metoo-vallankumous: Miten hiljaisuus rikottiin? (in Finnish). Helsinki: Like. ISBN 978-952-01-1847-1.

== See also ==
- Cinema of Finland
- #MeToo movement
