= Jenny af Forselles =

Finnish politician

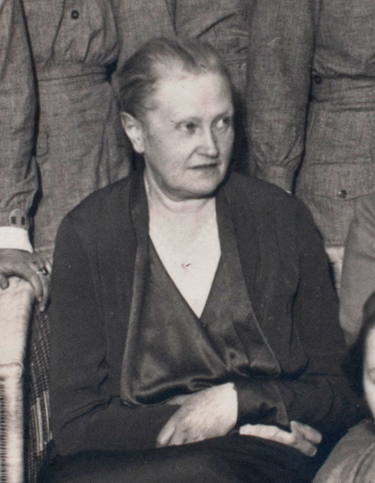
Jenny af Forselles

Jenny Mathilda af Forselles (27 May 1869 in Elimäki – 16 September 1938 in Helsinki) was a Finnish secondary school teacher and politician. She was a member of the Parliament of Finland from 1909 to 1910 and again from 1911 to 1917, representing the Swedish People's Party of Finland (SFP).

She was instrumental in the establishment of the Swedish-language women's magazine Nutid in 1895 and coedited it with Dagmar Neovius from 1909 to 1915. In addition to her editorial work, she also authored A.N. Clewberg-Edelcrantz och hans omgifning (1903).
