= Naisjärjestöjen Keskusliitto =

Naisjärjestöjen Keskusliitto (NJKL) (Finnish) or Kvinnoorganisationernas centralförbund (Swedish), is a non-profit Finnish women's organization which was established in 1911.

When the Finnish Women's Association was split in the Naisasialiitto Unioni (1892) and the Suomalainen naisliitto (1907), there was a need of an umbrella organization of the Finnish women's movement, and the Naisjärjestöjen Keskusliitto was founded in Helsinki in 1911 by Elin Sjöström.

The NJKL is dedicated for human rights, gender equality (particularly in the work place) and oppose domestic violence, trafficking and prostitution. It has 61 local branches with 400 000 members (2010).

It is affiliated to the European Women's Lobby.
