= Reino Ala-Kulju =

Finnish politician

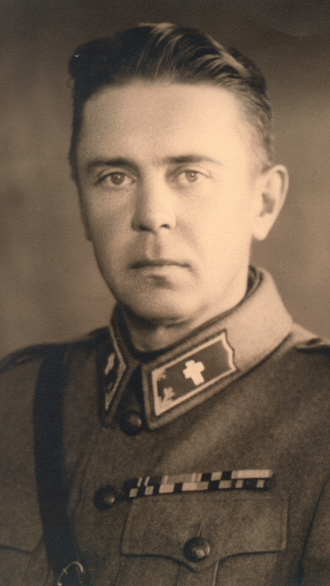
Reino Ala-Kulju

Reino Ala-Kulju (25 April 1898 – 5 August 1983) was a Finnish Lutheran clergyman, secondary school teacher and politician, born in Kuortane. He was a member of the Parliament of Finland, representing the Patriotic People's Movement (IKL) from 1933 to 1939 and the National Coalition Party from 1952 to 1954 and from 1959 to 1966. Eveliina Ala-Kulju was his mother.

== Civil war ==
Ala-Kulju participated in the disarmament of the Russians carried out by the Lapua Protectorate in January 1918. He participated in the Finnish Civil War in the ranks of the Whites and was involved in the battles of Vilppula, Ruovesi, Länkipohja and Orivesi. Ala-Kulju served as a group leader in the capture of Tampere, Lahti, Kouvola and Vyborg. He was wounded on March 18, 1918 in Oripohja.

Ala-Kulju participated in the Estonian War of Independence in 1919. He served as the head of Kuortanee's conservatorship and was also a member of the Independence Club Junkkarie 1917–1918. In his later years, Ala-Kulju participated in the activities of the Invalids of the War of Independence. Ala-Kulju participated in the work of the Protectorate as an education officer and a priest.

== Education and career ==
Ala-Kulju’s academic journey commenced with his graduation from Lapua in 1918, a year marked by his enrollment at the University of Helsinki. His scholarly pursuits culminated in a series of commendable achievements: an honorary degree in Theology (1925), a Bachelor of Philosophy (1931), and a Master’s degree (1932). His ordination as a priest coincided with his master’s graduation.

During his tenure at the university, Ala-Kulju was actively involved in student governance, serving on the student union’s board from 1925 to 1926. He also contributed to the Academic Karelian Society, ascending to the role of vice-president in 1926.

Ala-Kulju’s professional career began at Kristiina’s Finnish middle school in 1924. His educational path led him to Seinäjoki joint school in 1927, where he imparted knowledge in religion and philosophy. He advanced to become a senior lecturer at Seinäjoki co-ed high school (1930–1944), later assuming the positions of vice-principal (1930–1952) and principal (1952–1963) at the girls’ high school until his retirement.

In addition to his educational roles, Ala-Kulju was ordained again in 1929 and served with distinction as a military chaplain during the Second World War. His service extended through the Continuation War, where he held the position of enlightenment officer for the tribal warrior brigade and fulfilled pastoral duties in Eastern Karelia.

== Political career ==
Ala-Kulju’s political career was marked by three terms as a Member of Parliament. From 1933 to 1939, he represented the IKL, also serving as its general secretary from 1932 to 1936. He returned to parliament with the coalition from 1952 to 1954 and again from 1959 to 1966. Additionally, he was an elector in the presidential elections of 1950, 1956, and 1962. In 1964, he participated in a parliamentary inquiry initiated by Margit Borg-Sundman regarding Hannu Salama’s controversial novel “Midsummer Dances.”

Ala-Kulju was a staunch advocate for educational reform, promoting specialization and the matriculation examination. He championed the integration of lyceums and underscored the significance of uninterrupted academic progression. He stood against the imposition of uniforms on schoolchildren and the influence of political youth organizations.

From 1964 to 1967, Ala-Kulju held a position on the supervisory board of Yleisradio, contributing to the oversight of Finland’s national public broadcasting company.

== Hobbies and Cultural Engagement ==
Recognizing the cultural significance of radio, Ala-Kulju immersed himself in the medium. He led the program council of Seinäjoki regional radio from 1950 to 1956, and later held positions on the program council of Yleisradio from 1961 to 1962 and its supervisory board from 1963 to 1967.

Ala-Kulju dedicated his efforts to nurturing domestic work and cultural activities. His contributions were acknowledged when he was named honorary chairman of the home region associations of Seinäjoki and Kuortane. His influence permeated through his involvement with the South Ostrobothnia museum association, Kotiseutliitto, Talonpoikaissäätiö, and the Finnish Cultural Foundation’s South Ostrobothnia fund. Ala-Kulju also explored genealogy, further connecting with the region’s heritage.
