= Toini Topelius =

Finnish Writer (1854–1910)

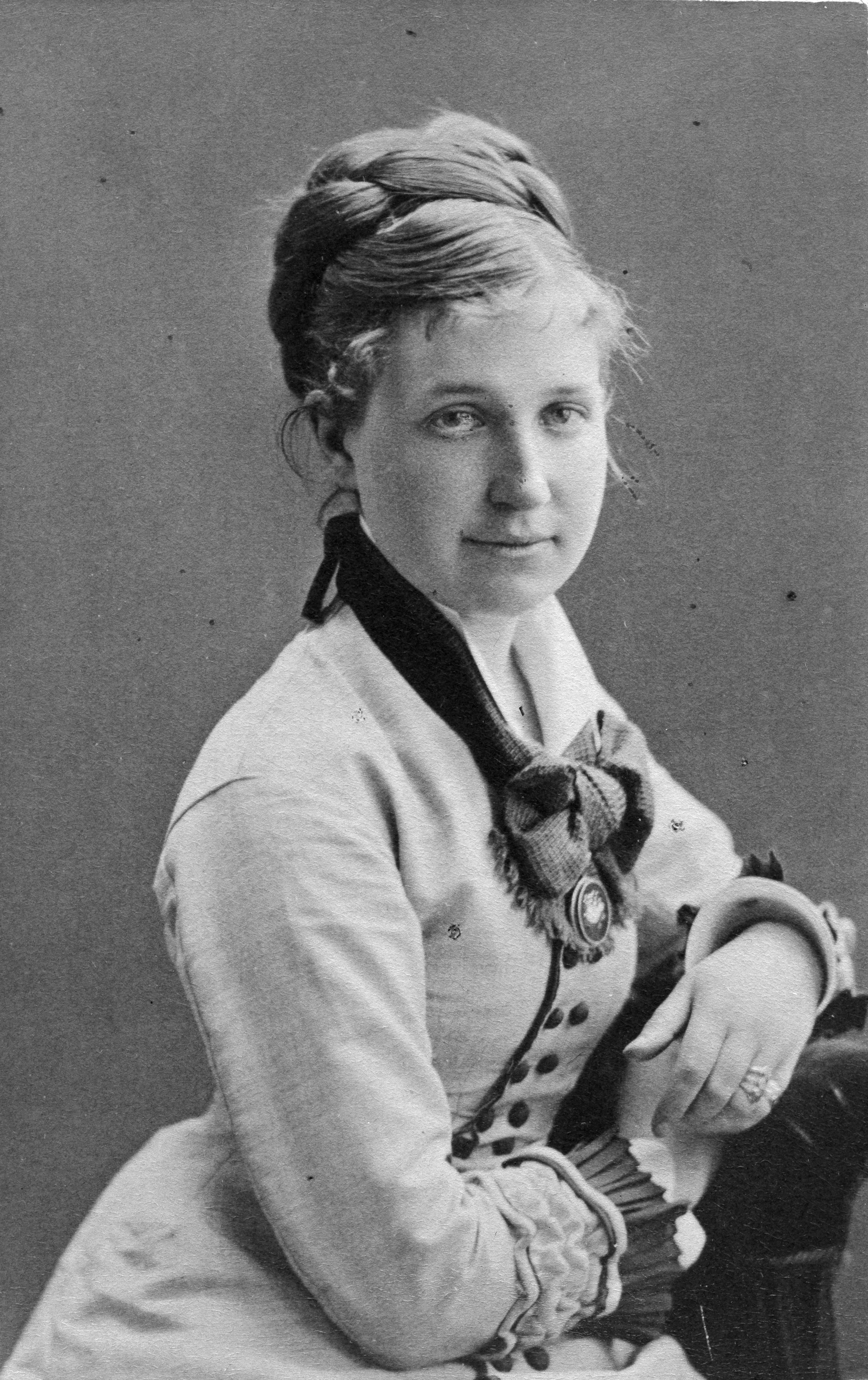
- Born: March 14, 1854; Helsinki, Finland
- Died: October 24, 1910 (aged 56); Ljan, Norway
- Writing career
- Language: Swedish

Toini Mathilda Topelius (March 14, 1854 Helsinki, Finland – October 24, 1910 Ljan, Norway) was a Finland-Swedish journalist and writer for young people.

== Life ==
Her parents were writer Zacharias Topelius and Emilie Lindqvist. With her sister Eva she attended Svenska fruntimmersskolan (a school for Swedish-speaking female pupils), and then studied art in Stockholm. Topelius suffered from impaired hearing and devoted herself mainly to literary themes in her painting.

She published Nya Trollsländan, a Swedish children's magazine, with Alexandra Gripenberg in the years 1885–1892 and 1891–1892 in Alta Dahlgren. In Finnish she also published Waxwing magazine. She published travel letters and served as reviewer of children's books. Her novel I utvecklingstid (1889) was first published in Finnish. She also published collections of fairy tales.

In the late 1890s Topelius moved to Norway, where she lived for the rest of her years.

== Works ==
- I utvecklingstid. 1889 (under the pseudonym Tea; Finnish title Kehitysaikana, Otava 1890)
- Julgubben: bilderbok med text, by Tea. Edlund, Helsinki 1889
- Familjen Himmelstjärna och Sidensvahnska bolaget : 10-16-åringar tillegnade. Edlund, Helsinki 1892 (Finnish title Tähtisen perhe ja tilhispesä, Otava 1893)
- Mietteitä naisesta ja siveellisyyskäsitteestä, esitelmä. Helsinki 1892
- Sommarsjö och vintersnö : sagor och berättelser. Bonnier, Stockholm 1897 (Finnish title Kesäisiä ja talvisia tarinoita, satuja ja kertomuksia, WSOY 1898)
- Sommarsjö och vintersnö : sagor och berättelser, andra samlingen. Bonnier, Stockholm 1900
