= Hilda Tihlä =

Finnish writer (1870–1944)

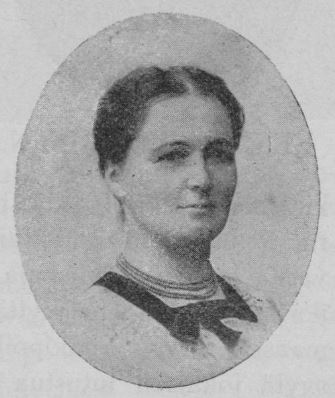
- Hilda Tihlä in 1909
- Born: Hilda Fredrika Joonaantytär Tihilä; February 8, 1870; Jämsä, Grand Duchy of Finland
- Died: March 27, 1944 (aged 74); Belomorsk, Republic of Karelia
- Education: University of Helsinki
- Occupation: Writer
- Writing career
- Notable work: Leeni (1907)

Hilda Fredrika Joonaantytär Tihlä (born Tihilä; February 8, 1870 – March 27, 1944) was a Finnish writer. From the mid-1920s until her death, she lived in the Soviet Union.

== Early work ==
Tihlä was born in Jämsä, Grand Duchy of Finland. At the beginning of her writing, she was a spiritual follower of Tolstoy, but she quickly began to focus on women's work and issues. In her writings for Työväenlehti, Tihla took a stand on the position of women and criticized the church and society's moral problems. The same themes can be seen in his prose. Along with Elvira Wilman and Hilja Pärssinen, Tihla was the most popular female writer in the labor movement. She is even known as the most famous female writer of the period before Finnish Declaration of Independence.

== Labor movement ==
She was born into a farming family on the Juoksonlahti farm near Jyväskylä in Finland. She grew up with her mother's relatives in Helsinki from the age of 9 and graduated from a girls' gymnastics school. later studied at the University of Helsinki in 1902–1907. At the height of the Revolutionary movement in 1905, she joined the Social Democratic Party of Finland. In 1906 she took part in the Sveaborg uprising. Later she took an active part in the labor movement and edited the newspaper "Roja" of the Helsinki Workers' Union.

== Emigration ==
She was arrested for her participation in the Finnish Socialist Workers' Republic of 1918, but escaped from prison and lived illegally for six years. In 1924, she moved illegally to Sweden, and from there immigrated to the Soviet Union. Hilda lived in the city of Gatchina, Leningrad Oblast, and worked as a teacher at a boarding school. From 1925 to 1941 she lived and worked in Petrozavodsk, working in the editorial offices of Finnish-language magazines and newspapers. In 1934 she was accepted into the Writers' Union of the Soviet Union.

== Death ==
She died on March 27, 1944, during the evacuation in Belomorsk.

== Creation ==
The first articles and stories of her were published in Finland at the beginning of the 20th century and received positive reviews from the famous Finnish writer Juhani Aho. From 1907 to 1916, six of her books were published in Finland, including the story (Leeni, 1907), the collection of stories From the Forest Villages (Metsäkyyliltä, 1909), the novel People (Ihmisiä, 1916). The collection of stories The Last (Kuopus, 1910) was published under the pseudonym Ryzhka Alko. In 1934–1936, she wrote and published the novel Lehti sverdy (Turned Pages) about Russian peasants and their path to revolution.

== Books ==
- Leeni: kertomus. Helsinki: Yrjö Weilin, 1907.
- Metsäkyliltä: kertomuksia. Porvoo: WSOY, 1909.
- Kuopus: ja muita kertomuksia. Nimellä Riikka Alho. Helsinki: Kansa, 1910.
- Jumalan lapsia: kolme kertomusta. Porvoo: WSOY, 1911.
- Hilma: elämän satua. Porvoo: WSOY, 1913.
- Ihmisiä: romaani. Hämeenlinna: Karisto, 1916.
- Lehti kääntyy, osa 1: Fedosej. Petroskoi: Valtion kustannusliike Kirja, 1934.
- Lehti kääntyy, osa 2. Petroskoi: Valtion kustannusliike Kirja, 1936.
- Valittua. Petroskoi: Karjalan kustannus, 1966.
