= Elin Sjöström =

Finnish writer (1851–1936)

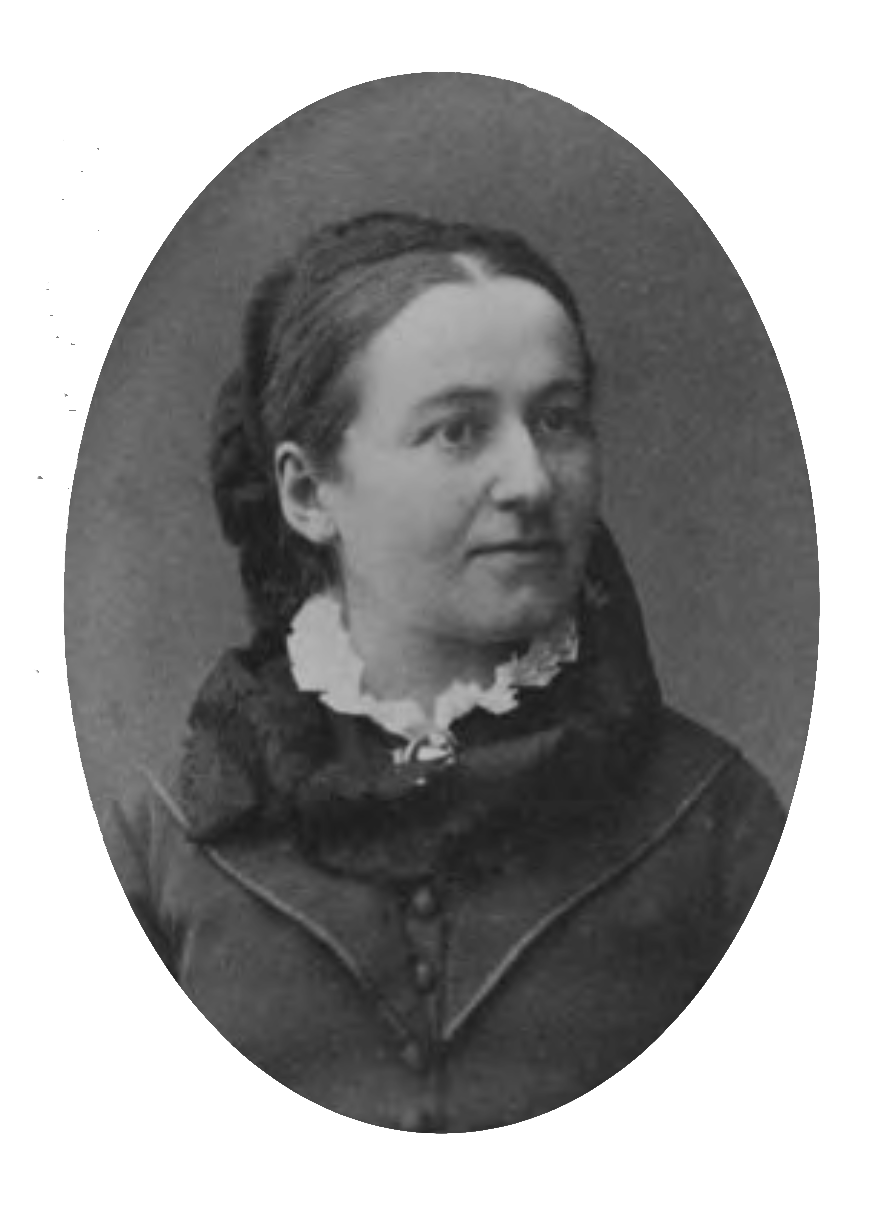
- Born: 19 March 1851; Mikkeli, Finland
- Died: 18 May 1936 (aged 85); Helsinki
- Occupation: Writer
- Known for: Presidents of Finnish Women's Association 1904–1909

Elin Sjöström (1851–1936) was a Finnish feminist. She was the head of the Finnish Women's Association in 1904–1909.

She was born to the official Gabriel Wilhelm Sundeberg and Sophie Jacobina Stenij. She was educated at the Heinola Girls' School and was employed there as a teacher. In 1869 she married Bernd Ferdinand Sjöström (d. 1893), an official at the Finnish Senate.

She was one of the founding members of the Finnish Women's Association in 1884, and was the deputy head in 1887–1888, its secretary in 1889–1904 and its president in 1904–1909. She was also active as the International Council of Women. In 1911, she founded the Naisjärjestöjen Keskusliitto, which became the umbrella organization of the Finnish feminist movement.
