= Jenny Upari =

Finnish trade unionist and politician (1882–1948)

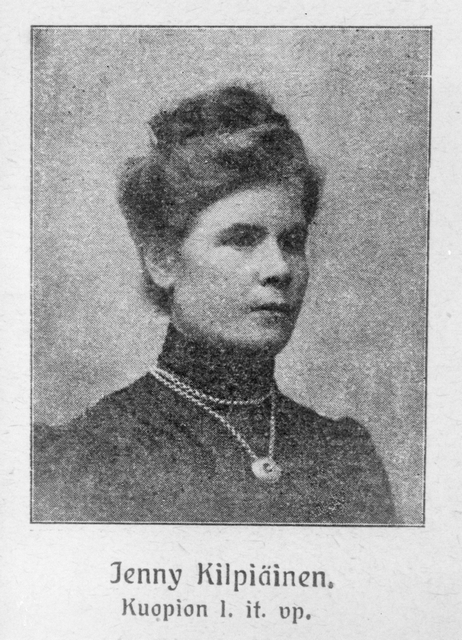

Member of Parliament
- In office 1907–1908
- Constituency: Kuopio East

Personal details
- Born: 30 January 1882; Vyborg, Grand Duchy of Finland, Russian Empire
- Died: 9 April 1948 (aged 66); Sipoo, Finland
- Political party: Social Democratic Party

Jenny Maria Upari (30 January 1882 – 9 April 1948) was a Finnish trade unionist and politician. A member of the Social Democratic Party, she was elected to Parliament in 1907 as one of the first group of female MPs. She was the youngest member of the first parliament, and also the first to take maternity leave. She remained an MP until the following year.

== Biography ==
Upari was born Jenny Maria Kilpiäinen in Vyborg in 1882. She worked as a weaver and married Villehad Nuotio, a policeman, taking his surname. The couple had two children. She also became secretary and treasurer of the Federation of Women Workers.

She contested the 1907 elections on the Social Democratic Party's list in Kuopio East and was one of 19 women elected to parliament. She was the youngest member of the first parliament, and was also pregnant when taking office, becoming the first woman to take maternity leave while in parliament. However, she lost her seat in the 1908 elections. During her time in parliament she sat on the Finance Committee and the Grand Committee.

After marrying Juho Aleksi Upari in 1918, she took his surname. She died in Sipoo in 1948.
