= Hellsten =

Hellsten or Hellstén is a Swedish surname that may refer to

- Johan Hellsten (born 1975), Swedish chess grandmaster
- Milja Hellsten (born 1990), Finnish curler
- Nils Hellsten (fencer) (1886–1962), Swedish fencer
- Nils Hellsten (gymnast) (1885–1963), Swedish gymnast
- Voitto Hellstén (1932–1998), Finnish sprinter

== See also ==
- Hallsten
