= Koti ja Yhteiskunta =

Finnish women's magazine (1889–1911)

- Editor-in-chief: Alexandra Gripenberg
- Categories: Women's magazine
- Frequency: Monthly
- Publisher: Finnish Women’s Association
- Founder: Alexandra Gripenberg
- Founded: 1889
- First issue: 14 April 1889
- Final issue: 31 December 1911
- Country: Finland
- Based in: Helsinki
- Language: Finnish

Koti ja Yhteiskunta (Finnish: Home and Society) was a monthly women's magazine which was published in Helsinki in the period 1889–1911. It was the official media outlet of the Finnish Women’s Association.

== History and profile ==
Koti ja Yhteiskunta was first published on 14 April 1889. The founder was Alexandra Gripenberg who also edited the magazine which covered both political writings and domestic articles. She was the sole editor-in-chief of the magazine until 1911 and published various articles. Her writings mostly covered the achievements of women in different countries.

Koti ja Yhteiskunta was published by the Finnish Women’s Association on a monthly basis. The magazine supported the education of women in the 1890s. There was a section of the magazine entitled National News in which it reported statistics on female university graduates. Koti ja Yhteiskunta opposed to women's having sex and children before marriage and denounced the working-class and rural women who were frequently practising these. The magazine also regarded female servants as a threat for family life and demanded that female servants should be tested for sexually transmitted diseases.

After producing a total of 273 issues Koti ja Yhteiskunta ceased publication on 31 December 1911.
