= Elisabeth Lounasmaa =

Finnish translator (1851–1931)

Elisabeth Lounasmaa (1851–1931) was a Finnish feminist. She was the head of the Finnish Women's Association in 1884–1889.

She was born to the clerk Karl Christian Avella and Maria Gustava Ekman. She was educated in Sweden at the school of Cecilia Fryxell, and worked as a translator, as a transcriptor at the Finnish Senat, and as a teacher at the Swedish Girls school in Helsinki.

In 1871 she married Viktor Löfgren (from 1906 named Lounasmaa) (d. 1909), editor in chief of the newspaper Uusi Suometar.

She was one of the founding members of the Finnish Women's Association in 1884.
