= Fredrique Paijkull =

Swedish educator

- Born: 1836
- Died: 1899 (aged 62–63)
- Occupation: educator
- Known for: pioneer for the folk high school in Sweden

Fredrika Augusta "Fredrique" Paijkull (née Broström; 22 September 1836–1899) was a Swedish educator. She was a pioneer for the folk high schools in Sweden. She opened the first folk high school for women in Sweden.

== Life ==
Paijkull was born in Stockholm to lieutenant Carl Broström and Kerstin Schenson. She was raised at the manor Farhsta, as the neighbor of Fredrika Bremer. Paijkull was educated first by private teachers and then at the Wallinska skolan in Stockholm: from 1860 to 1862, she worked as a governess.

In 1862, she married the pioneer of folk high school in Sweden, the geologist and educator Baron Wilhelm Paijkull (1836–1869). Her spouse was appointed school inspector in Samuelsberg. After a trip to Denmark, Paijkull and her husband were equally impressed by the folk high school system in Denmark, and wished to introduce it in Sweden. In 1870, she founded the first folk high school for women in Sweden in Samuelsberg in Motala, which was moved to Helsingborg in 1873 and Tågaborg in 1876. She was herself the manager of the school. Fredrique Paijkull is described as intellectual and idealistic.

In 1880, Paijkull was financially forced to close her school. She returned to Stockholm, where she worked as a translator.

== See also ==
- Sofia Hagman
