= Sofia Hagman (educator) =

Finnish educator

Sofia Elisabeth Hagman (17 September 1842 – 26 January 1900) was a Finnish educator. She was a pioneer within the development of the Folk high school in Finland.

Hagman was the daughter of police master Nils Johan Erik Hagman and Margareta Sofia Nordman. She was the sister of the women's rights activist Lucina Hagman and writer Tycho Hagman. She graduated as an educated in Jyväskylä in 1871 and worked as such and then as the manager of a girls school in S:T Michel in 1879–1887. In 1889, she started the first folk high school in Finland in Kangasala, and was its manager in 1889–1900. Her folk high school focused on the education of women to handicrafts professions, and it did not survive her death long.

== See also ==
- Fredrique Paijkull
