= Onni Hallsten =

Finnish politician

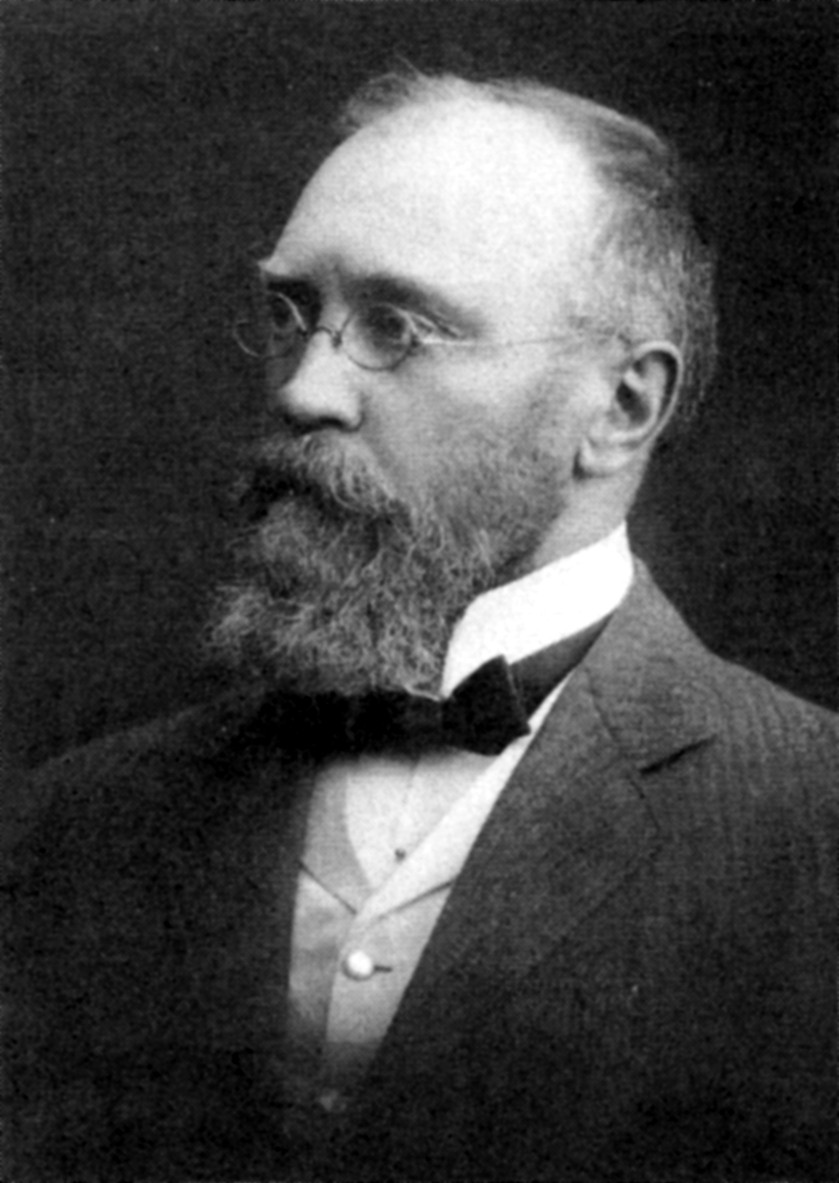
Onni Hallsten

Gustaf Onni Immanuel Hallsten (5 January 1858, Vaasa – 26 October 1937) was a Finnish secondary school teacher, civil servant and politician. He was a member of the Diet of Finland from 1899 to 1900 and of the Parliament of Finland from 1908 to 1910 and from 1911 to 1917, representing the Finnish Party. He was married to Ilmi Hallsten.
