= Hilma Räsänen =

Finnish politician

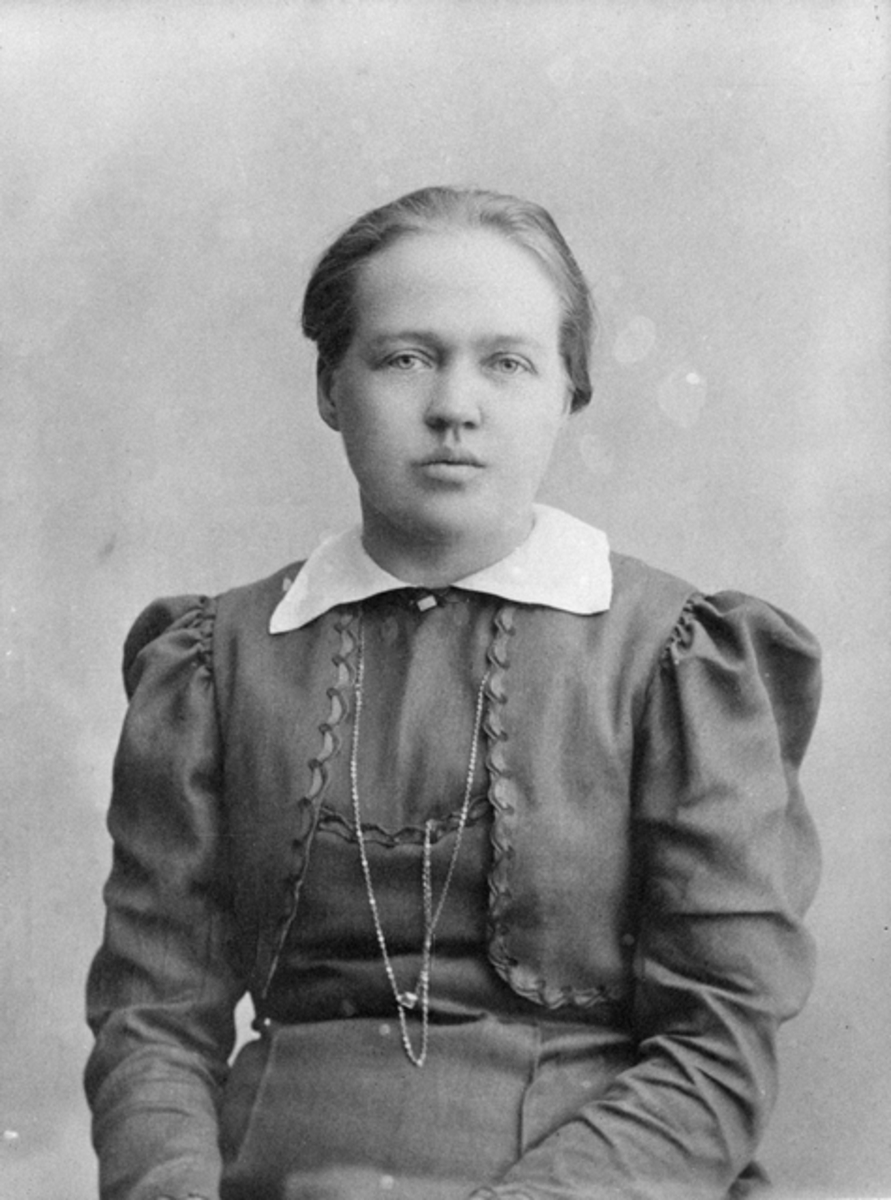

Member of Parliament
- In office 1907–1908
- Constituency: East Vyborg

Personal details
- Born: 28 March 1877; Kuopio, Grand Duchy of Finland, Russian Empire
- Died: 20 January 1955 (aged 77); Vihti, Finland
- Political party: Agrarian League

Hilma Sohvi Räsänen (28 March 1877 – 20 January 1955) was a Finnish educator and politician. A member of the Agrarian League, she was elected to Parliament in 1907 as one of the first group of female MPs. She remained an MP until the following year.

== Biography ==
Räsänen was born in Kuopio in 1877. Between 1900 and 1907 she worked as a primary school teacher in Sippola, Kuopion maalaiskunta, Jämsä and Viipuri Province. She was also a speaker for the Temperance movement and the Naisasialiitto Unioni.

She contested the 1907 elections on the Agrarian League's list in East Vyborg and was one of 19 women elected to parliament. However, she lost her seat in the 1908 elections. During her time in parliament she sat on the Grand Committee.

After leaving parliament, she worked as a primary school teacher in Helsinki between 1908 and 1917, after which she became a writer. She also managed a women's rest home in Askola. She died in Vihti in 1955.
