= Maikki Friberg =

Finnish suffragist and peace activist

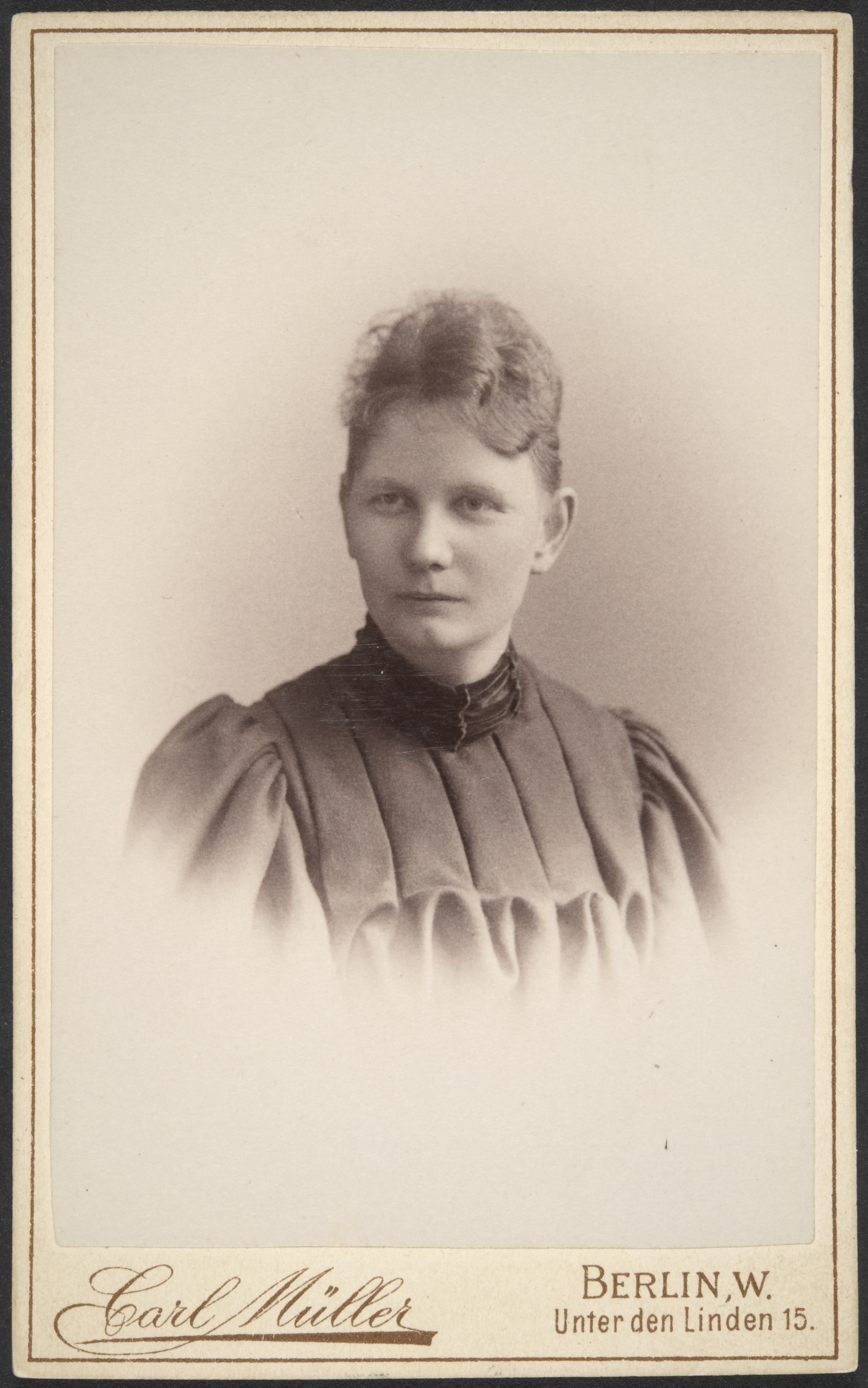
Maikki Friberg

Maria (Maikki) Elisabeth Friberg (5 January 1861 – 6 November 1927) was a Finnish educator, journal editor, suffragist and peace activist. She is remembered for her involvement in the Finnish women's movement, especially as chair of the Finnish women's rights organisation Suomen Naisyhdistys and as the founder and editor of the women's journal Naisten Ääni (Women's Voice). She travelled widely, promoting understanding of Finland abroad while participating in international conferences and contributing to the foreign press.

== Biography ==
Born on 5 January 1861 in Kankaanpää, Maria Elisabeth Friberg was the daughter of Karl Arvid Friberg and Fanny Adelaide Boijer. After her father's early death, her mother moved with the children to Tampere where she opened a guest house. Friberg attended the Swedish School for Women in Helsinki where she matriculated from the teacher training class.

In 1883, Friberg obtained a teaching post in Helsinki's folk high school which she held until 1912. She studied in Berlin and Zürich, graduating from the University of Bern in 1897 with a thesis on Nordic folk law. Thereafter she attended lectures on economics at the University of Brussels, becoming fluent in German, French and English. Until 1906, she made frequent study trips around Europe, perfecting her experience of teaching methods. She also became acquainted with other Scandinavians, especially Danes.

While travelling in 1906, Friberg became interested in the women's movement, attending various conventions and congresses, where she frequently represented Kvinnosaksförbundet Unionen (the Union Women's Association). In 1906, at the International Alliance of Women meeting in Copenhagen, her views on voting rights were particularly welcome as that year Finnish women had gained the right to vote. At this stage, she was especially interested in pacifism and temperance. She nevertheless continued to spread knowledge about Finland, giving lectures about Finnish and Sámi schools in Germany, Austria and Denmark, including the Russian government's policy of limiting Finnish autonomy.

With 30 years of increasingly wide teaching experience, in 1912 Friberg applied for the position of Deputy Inspector of the Helsinki Folk Schools but the appointment was given to Guss Mattsson of the Helsinki City Council, the authority organizing the selection. She was so upset that she decided to give up teaching, preferring to devote her time to women's issues.

A member of the Finnish Women's Association from 1889, serving on the board from 1907 to 1924, and of the Union Association, which she co-founded in 1892 and chaired from 1920 to 1927, Friberg was also active in the Finnish peace association Finlands Fredsförbund. She also contributed articles to Finnish and foreign newspapers and founded her own magazine Naisten ääni (Women's Voice) in 1905 which she edited until her death. In 1909 in Naisten ääni, she published an account of the International Alliance of Women congress in London.

Maikki Friberg died in Helsinki on 6 November 1927.

== See also ==
- List of peace activists
