= Hilda Käkikoski =

Finnish politician, writer and schoolteacher (1864–1912)

Hilda Maria Käkikoski
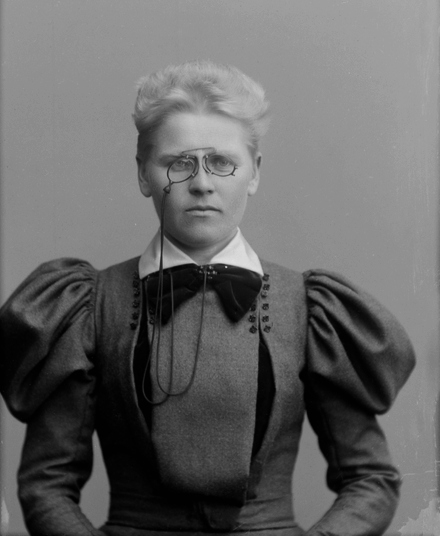
- Hilda Käkikoski in 1897
- Born: Hilda Maria Sjöström; 31 January 1864; Lapinjärvi, Finland
- Died: 14 November 1912 (aged 48)
- Occupations: Politician, writer and schoolteacher

Hilda Maria Käkikoski (31 January 1864 – 14 November 1912) was a Finnish politician, writer and schoolteacher. She was one of the first nineteen women elected to Finnish parliament in 1907.

== Life and career ==
Käkikoski was born Hilda Maria Sjöström in Lapinjärvi in 1864. She was described as a tomboyish child growing up in the countryside. She moved to Helsinki by herself at the age of 14 to attend a girls' high school with a scholarship. There, she cut her hair short and changed her Swedish surname to Käkikoski, the Finnish surname of her neighbours. After finishing school, she worked as a home tutor until 1888 when she enrolled in university; she completed a PhD in Finnish and Nordic history in 1895. She went on to become a teacher at a Helsinki school, teaching classes in history and the Finnish language from 1891 until 1902. Her students found her fascinating due to her unconventional habits and interests, such as being a vegetarian, gymnast, cyclist, wearing masculine clothing and having an assertive demeanor.

As Käkikoski developed an interest in feminism and women's suffrage, she became an active member of the Finnish Women's Association, and wrote numerous articles for the association's magazine. She was elected its vice president in 1895 and held the position until 1904. In 1907, she ran for election with the conservative Finnish Party to the newly established Parliament of Finland; the 1907 election marked the first that women were able to vote and be voted in. Käkikoski won the vote in her district, Uusimaa, and became one of the first 19 women elected to parliament. She did not stand for re-election in 1910 due to health problems.

Käkikoski's literary work included children's songs, poetry and short stories. In 1902, she began writing a four-volume account of Finnish history. She continued working on the project until her death in 1912, but the work was never completed.

== Personal life ==
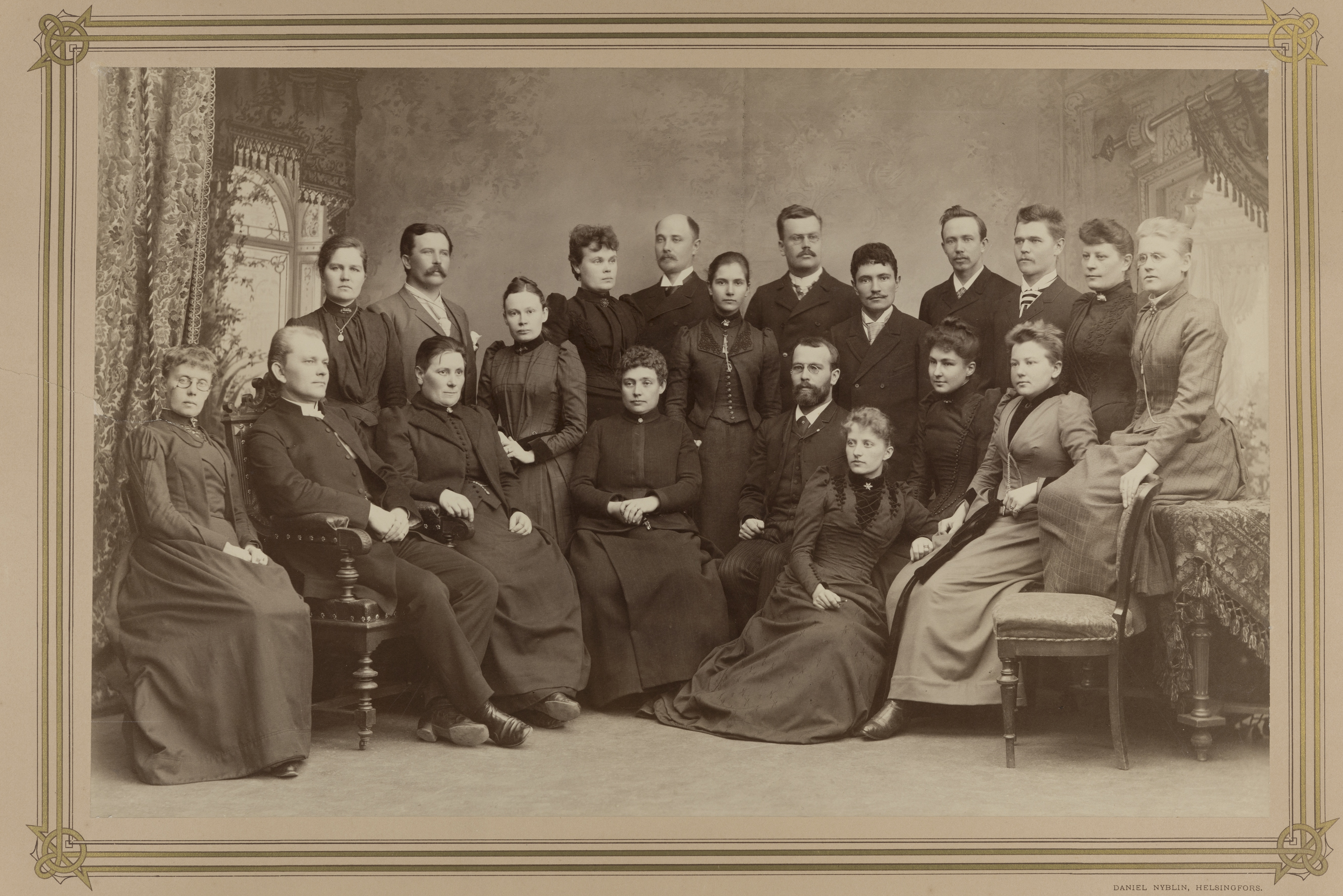
With a group of other Finnish teachers, 1891. Käkikoski is sitting on a table at the far right; her partner Fanny Pajula is standing, 4th from left.

Käkikoski was a lesbian. One of her early relationships was with schoolteacher and activist Fanny Pajula, with whom she lived for six years until 1895. Later in life, Käkikoski was romantically involved with her married friend Hildi Ennola, her American friend Frances Weiss, deaconess Hanna Masalin, and political activist Helmi Kivalo; Käkikoski maintained involvement in all of these relationships until her death in 1912. Käkikoski is buried alongside Ennola at Karjalohja, Finland. A statue honouring her can be found in Porlammi.
