= Ilmi Hallsten =

Finnish politician

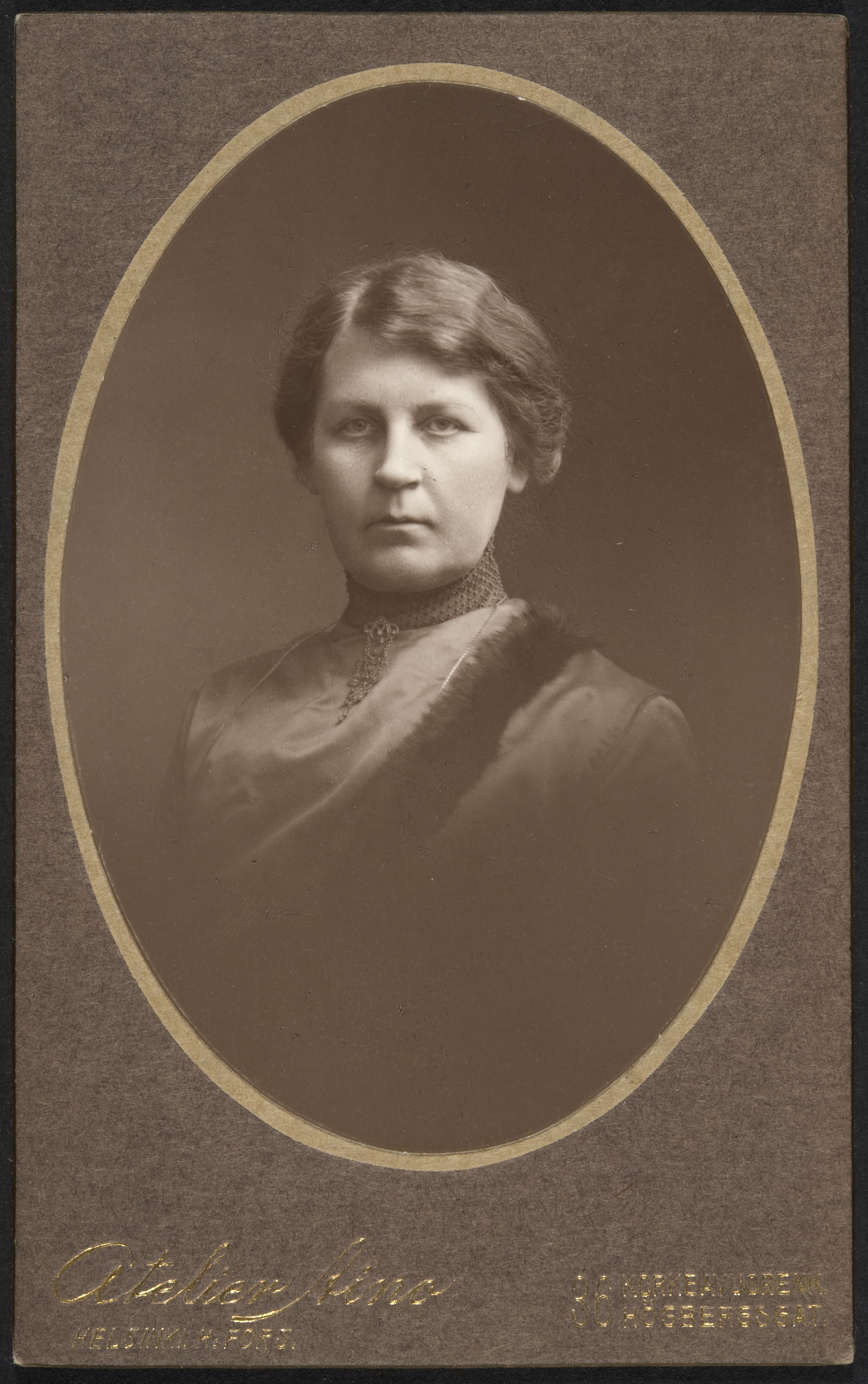
Ilmi Hallsten around 1910

Ilmi Lovisa Hallsten (née Bergroth; 25 December 1862 – 4 January 1936) was a Finnish secondary school teacher and politician. She was a member of the Parliament of Finland from 1919 to 1922, representing the National Coalition Party. She was the head of the Finnish Women's Association in 1913–1936.

Hallsten was born in Föglö. She was married to Onni Hallsten.

She went to the Swedish-language co-educational school Nya svenska samskolan.
