= Sandra Lehtinen =

Finnish politician

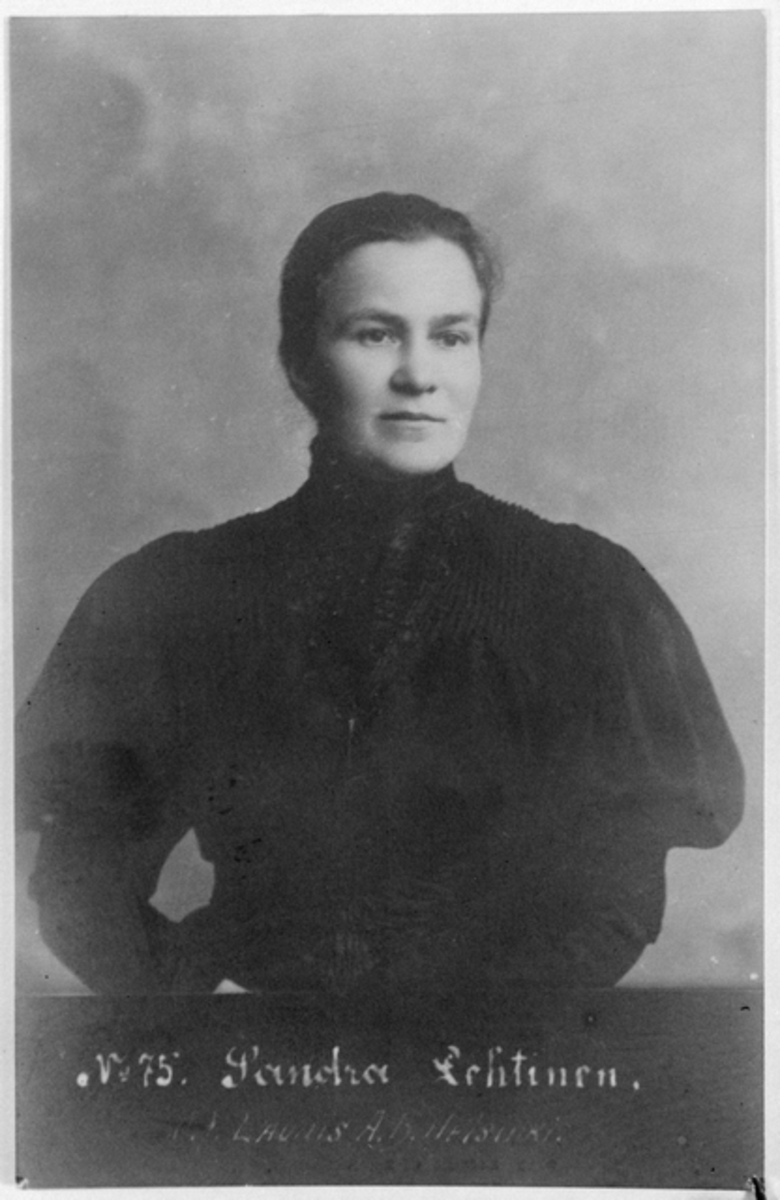

Member of Parliament
- In office 1907–1910
- Constituency: North Häme

Personal details
- Born: 1 July 1873; Parikkala, Grand Duchy of Finland, Russian Empire
- Died: 5 September 1954 (aged 81); Helsinki, Finland
- Political party: Social Democratic Party

Aleksandra Lehtinen (10 January 1859 – 5 September 1954) was a Finnish politician and trade unionist. A member of the Social Democratic Party, she was elected to Parliament in 1907 as one of the first group of female MPs, remaining in parliament until 1910.

== Biography ==
Lehtinen was born in Parikkala in 1873. She worked as a servant and seamstress in Helsinki and Oulu, before becoming an organiser and speaker for the Social Democratic Party in 1903. In 1905 she was a member of the committee that organised a general strike.

Lehtinen contested the 1907 elections on the party's list in North Häme and was one of 19 women elected to parliament. She was re-elected in 1908 and 1909, serving until February 1910. During her time in parliament she sat on the Editorial Affairs, Legal Affairs and Municipal committees. She was also a member of the City Council of Helsinki.

After leaving parliament, she was a spokeswoman for the Social Democratic Women's League and served as its secretary between 1916 and 1918. Her husband Jussi was elected to parliament in 1917. Following the Finnish Civil War, the couple moved to Buy in Russia, where she became head of a children's home. However, she returned to Finland three years later, becoming an organiser for the Socialist Workers' Party.

Lehtinen also became an organiser for the Food Workers' Union and was a speaker for the Workers' Abstinence Federation between 1925 and 1929. In 1929 she was imprisoned for her political views. After being released in 1932, she moved to the Soviet Union the following year, living in Moscow and Petrozavodsk. She returned to Finland again in 1945 and died in Helsinki in 1954.

Her daughter Inkeri was an activist for the Communist Party.
