= Maria Paaso-Laine =

Finnish politician

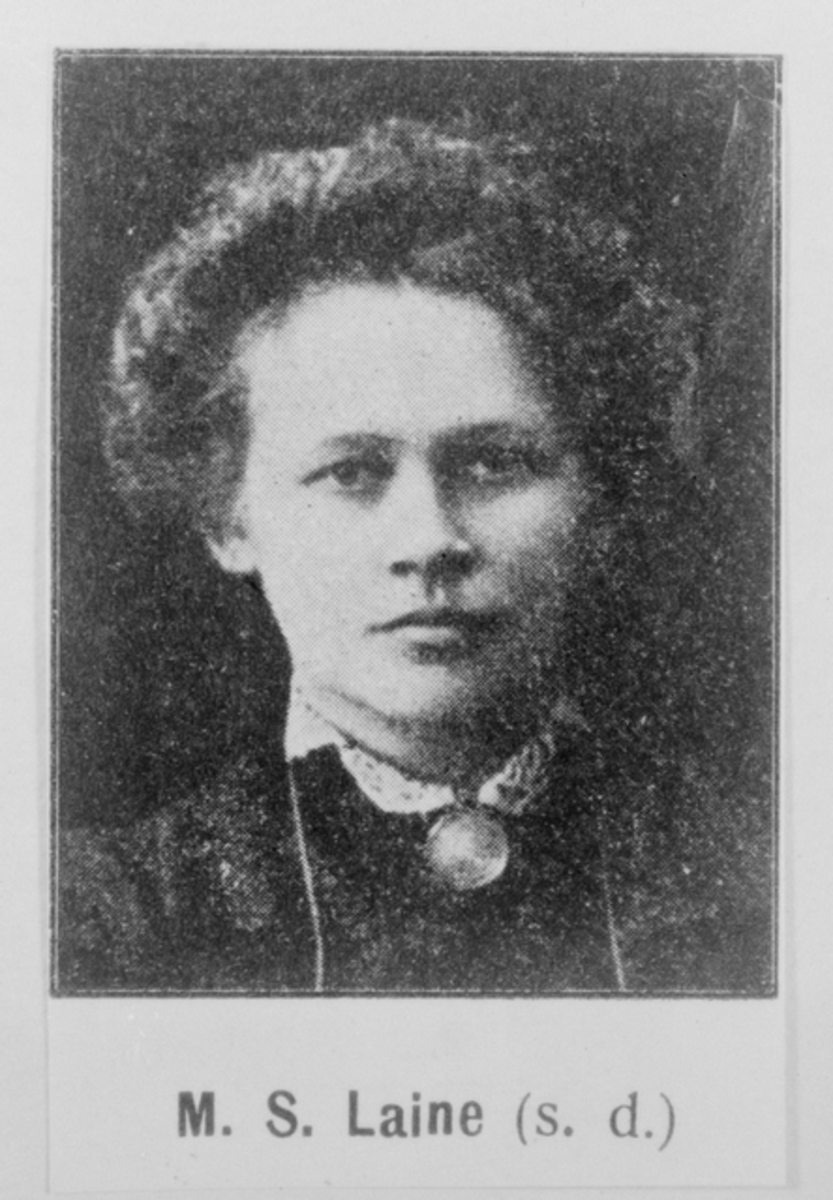

Member of Parliament
- In office 1907–1908
- Constituency: Tavastia South

Personal details
- Born: 13 November 1868 Ii, Grand Duchy of Finland, Russian Empire
- Died: 5 May 1945 (aged 78) Helsinki, Finland
- Party: Social Democratic Party

Maria Sofia Paaso-Laine (13 November 1868 – 5 May 1945) was a Finnish politician. A member of the Social Democratic Party, she was elected to Parliament in 1907 as one of the first group of female MPs. She remained an MP until the following year.

== Biography ==
Paaso-Laine was born in Ii in 1868. She attended industrial school and worked as a maid and seamstress in Helsinki. Between 1900 and 1902 she was secretary of the Social Democratic Women's League. She was a course director for the Ideal Union and headed the youth section of the Temperance movement. Between 1903 and 1905 she lived in Sweden.

Paaso-Laine contested the 1907 elections on the Social Democratic Party's list in Tavastia South and was one of 19 women elected to parliament. However, she lost her seat in the 1908 elections. During her time in parliament she sat on the Committee on Legal Affairs, and attracted attention and criticism for dressing in an upper-class style.

During the Finnish Civil War she was a member of the Red Food Command. Following the war she was briefly imprisoned at Hämeenlinna prison camp. She later ran a paper shop in Helsinki, where she died in 1945.
