= Liisi Kivioja =

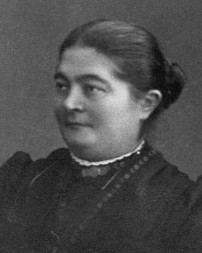

Member of Parliament
- In office 1907–1910
- Constituency: South Vaasa

Personal details
- Born: 10 January 1859; Siikajoki, Grand Duchy of Finland, Russian Empire
- Died: 30 October 1925 (aged 66); Helsinki, Finland
- Political party: Finnish Party

Liisi Kivioja (10 January 1859 – 30 October 1925) was a Finnish educator, politician and banker. A member of the Finnish Party, she was elected to Parliament in 1907 as one of the first group of female MPs, remaining in parliament until 1910.

== Biography ==
Kivioja was born in Siikajoki in 1859. She worked as a primary school teacher in Vähäkyrö in 1881 and 1882, and then in Oulunsalo between 1882 and 1888. She married Aapeli Kivioja in 1888, and the couple lived in the United States between 1891 and 1897. She returned to Finland and worked as a housekeeper and primary school teacher.

As a member of the Finnish Party, Kivioja contested the 1907 elections and was one of 19 women elected to parliament. She was re-elected in 1908 and 1909, serving until February 1910. During her time in parliament she sat on the Grand Committee, the Municipal Committee and the Committee on Workers' Affairs.

After leaving parliament, she served as director of a trade school for elderly blind people in Kuopio between 1910 and 1918, and then managed the Kalajoki branch of the Kansallis-Osake-Pankki until her death in 1925.
