= Mimmi Kanervo =

Finnish politician

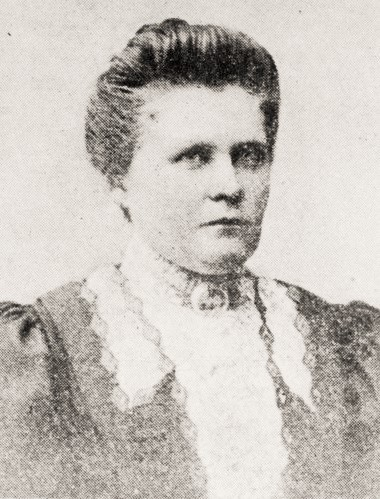

Member of Parliament
- In office 1907–1917
- Constituency: North Turku

Personal details
- Born: 26 May 1870; Urjala, Grand Duchy of Finland, Russian Empire
- Died: 1 April 1922 (aged 51); Helsinki, Finland
- Political party: Social Democratic Party

Mimmi Kanervo (26 May 1870 – 1 April 1922) was a Finnish politician and trade unionist. A member of the Social Democratic Party, she was elected to Parliament in 1907 as one of the first group of female MPs, remaining in parliament until 1917.

== Biography ==
Kanervo was born in Urjala in 1870. She worked as a servant in the countryside and Turku, before becoming secretary of the Finnish Domestic and Restaurant Workers' Union. She joined the Social Democratic Party and was a member of the Federal Committee of the party's Women's League. In 1905 she was a member of the committee that organised a general strike.

Kanervo contested the 1907 elections on the Social Democratic Party's list in North Turku and was one of 19 women elected to parliament. She was re-elected in 1908, 1909, 1910, 1911, 1913 and 1916, serving until April 1917. During her time in parliament she sat on the Banking, Customs and Finance committees.

In 1918 she was imprisoned for political reasons. After being released, she worked as a lecturer for the Social Democratic Party Women's League. She was a candidate in Häme in the 1919 parliamentary elections, but failed to be elected. She died in Helsinki in April 1922, and was buried in Hietaniemi Cemetery.
