= Dagmar Neovius =

Finnish educator and politician

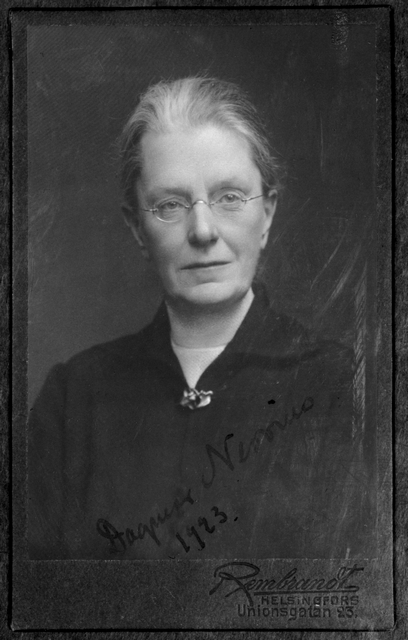

Member of Parliament
- In office 1907–1909, 1910–1911
- Constituency: South Turku
- In office 1914–1917
- Constituency: South Vasa

Personal details
- Born: 21 May 1867 Moscow, Russian Empire
- Died: 27 July 1939 (aged 72) Helsinki, Finland
- Party: Swedish People's Party

Dagmar Louise Charlotte Neovius (21 May 1867 – 27 July 1939) was a Finnish educator and politician. A member of the Swedish People's Party, she was elected to Parliament in 1907 as one of the first group of female MPs. She had three spells as an MP between 1907 and 1917.

== Biography ==
Neovius was born in Moscow in 1867. She was a teacher at the Swedish-language Nya svenska samskolan between 1889 and 1908, also running her own school from 1894. She was a member of the Naisasialiitto Unioni and was one of the founders of the Martha organisation. During the resistance to Russian rule, she was involved in the Kagal. Her school was closed and she moved to Stockholm in Sweden, from where she helped distribute the Fria Ord magazine.

After returning to Finland, Neovius contested the 1907 elections on the Swedish People's Party's list in South Turku. She was one of 19 women elected to parliament and the only one from her party. She was re-elected in 1908. Although she lost her seat in 1909, she returned to parliament following the 1910 elections. She lost her seat again in the 1911 elections, but returned to parliament in February 1914, representing the South Vasa constituency. She was re-elected in 1916, serving until April 1917. During her time in parliament she sat on the Grand Committee and Committee on Legal Affairs.

Between 1909 and 1917 she was editor of the Nutid and Samtid magazines. She then worked as director of the Helsinki Bread Office until 1921. In 1922 she became an actuary at the Statistical Office, a job she held until 1927. She died in Helsinki in 1939.
