= Maria Raunio =

Finnish educator and politician

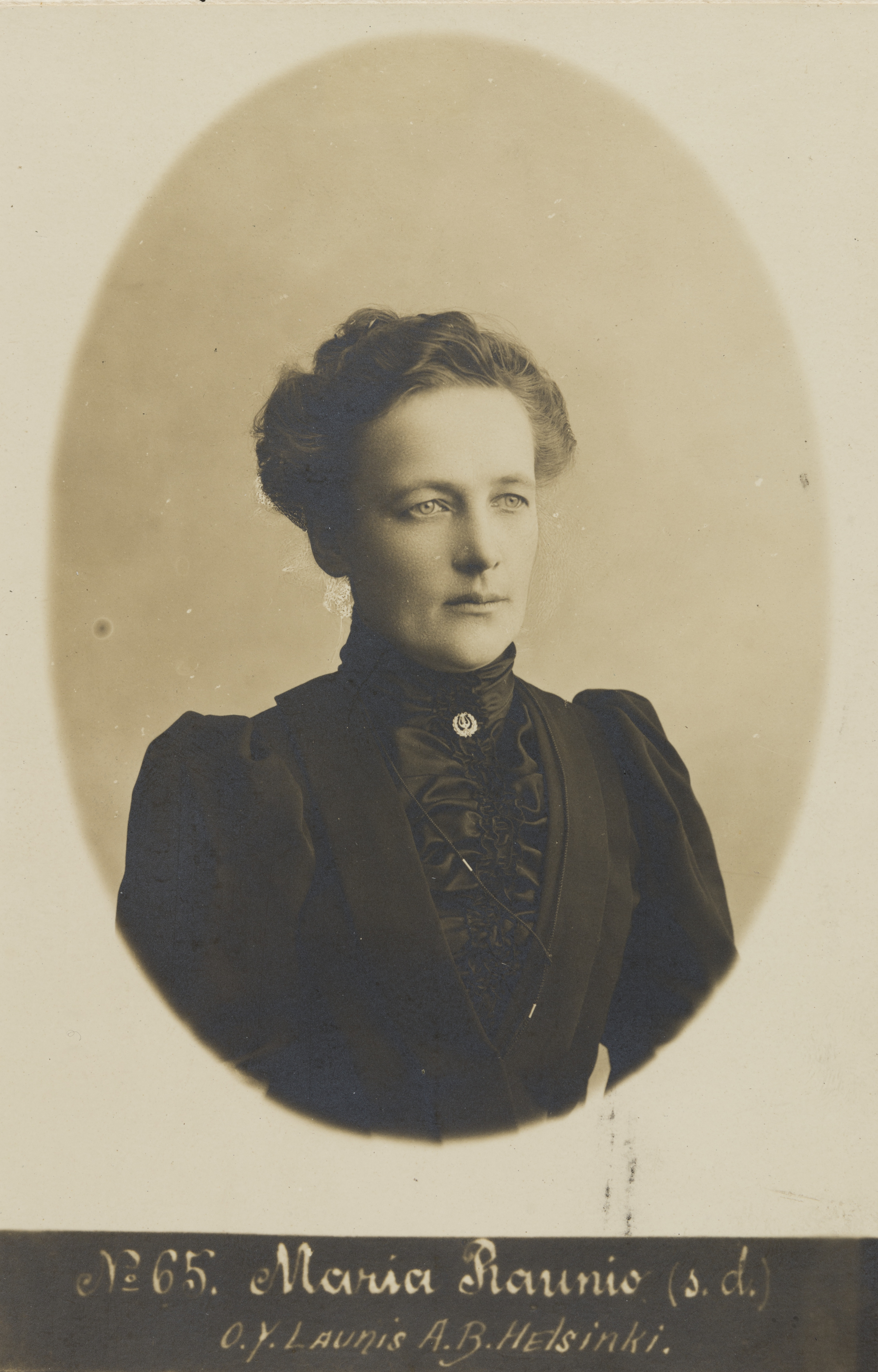

Member of Parliament
- In office 1907–1910
- Constituency: East Vaasa

Personal details
- Born: 26 May 1872 Keuruu, Grand Duchy of Finland, Russian Empire
- Died: 3 September 1911 (aged 39) Astoria, United States
- Party: Social Democratic Party

Maria Raunio (26 May 1872 – 3 September 1911) was a Finnish educator and politician. A member of the Social Democratic Party, she was elected to Parliament in 1907 as one of the first group of female MPs. She remained an MP until 1910.

== Biography ==
Raunio was born in Keuruu in 1872. She worked as a seamstress in Keuruu and Tampere, before joining the office of the Kansan Lehti newspaper. She had seven children.

Raunio contested the 1907 elections on the Social Democratic Party's list in East Vaasa and was one of 19 women elected to parliament. She was re-elected in 1908 and 1909. However, she lost her seat in the 1910 elections after being removed from the party's lists due to differences with party officials. During her time in parliament she sat on the Audit Committee, the Education Committee, the Grand Committee and the Pensions Committee.

After leaving parliament, she moved to the United States, where she was an activist for workers' rights before committing suicide aged 39 in 1911.

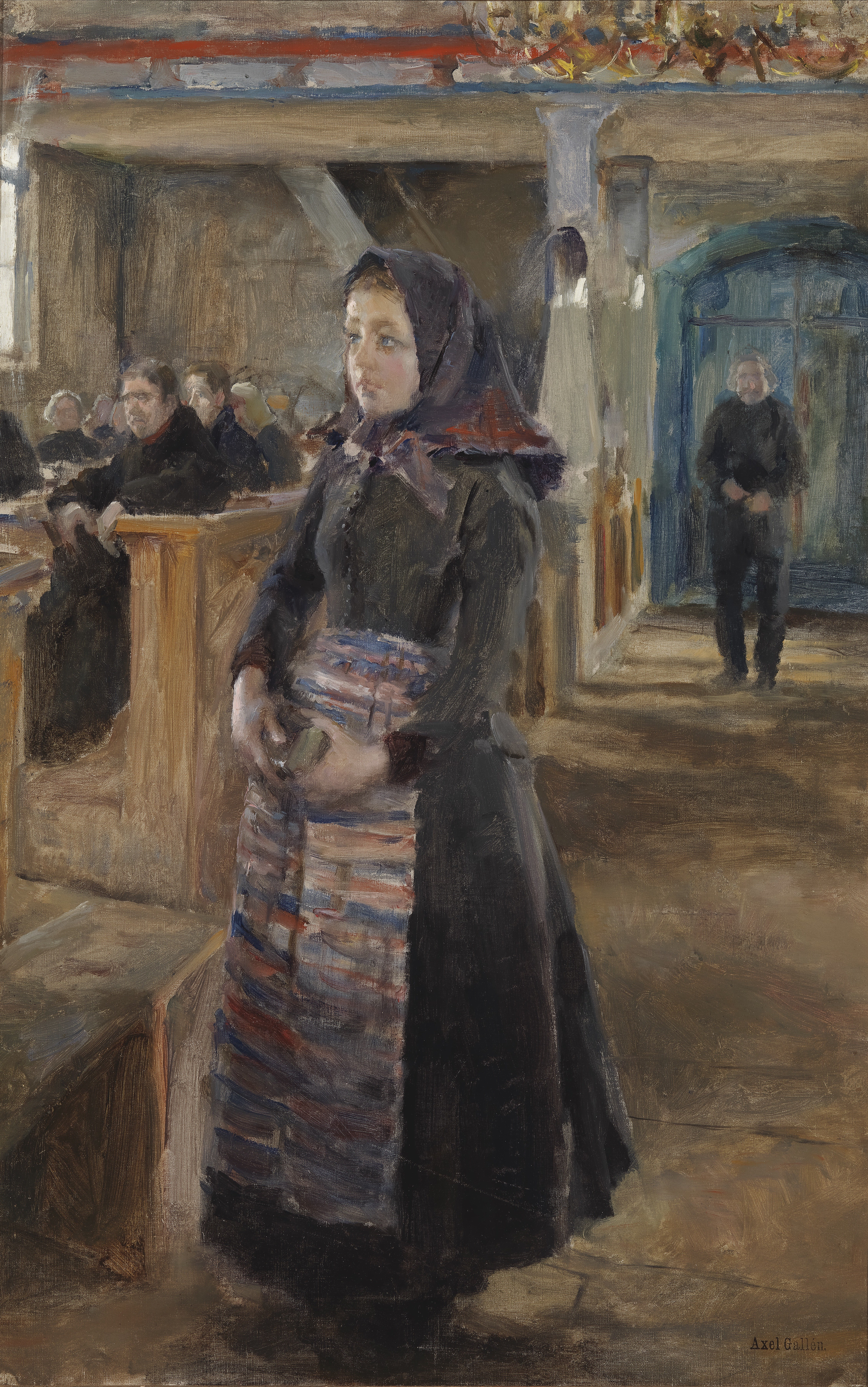
Girl in the Old Church of Keuruu by Akseli Gallen-Kallela, 1889, where Raunio acted as the model
