= Anni Huotari =

Finnish politician (1874–1943)

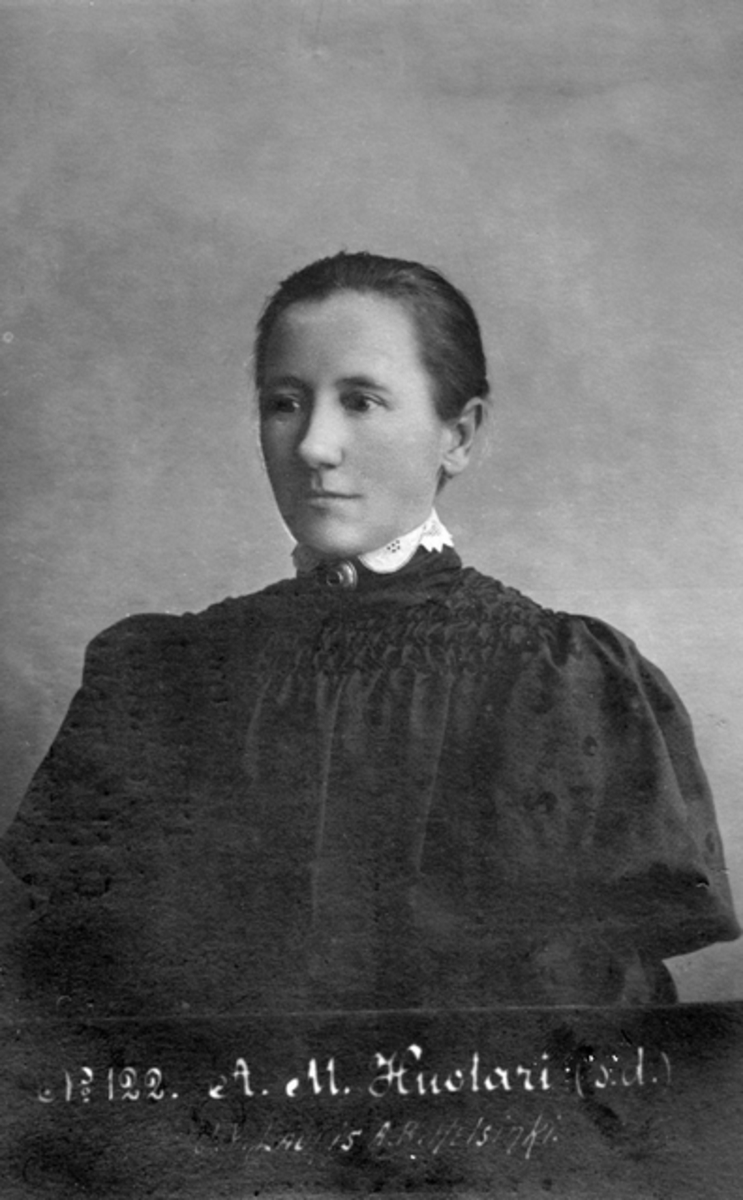
Anni Huotari (1907)

Anni Huotari (13 July 1874, Viipuri – 15 April 1943; née Torvelainen) was a Finnish politician. She was a Member of the Parliament of Finland from 1907 to 1910, from 1911 to 1918, from 1922 to 1927 and again from 1932 until her death in 1943. Anni Huotari was imprisoned from 1918 to 1919 for having sided with the Reds during the Finnish Civil War. She was married to Anton Huotari.
