= Hilja Pärssinen =

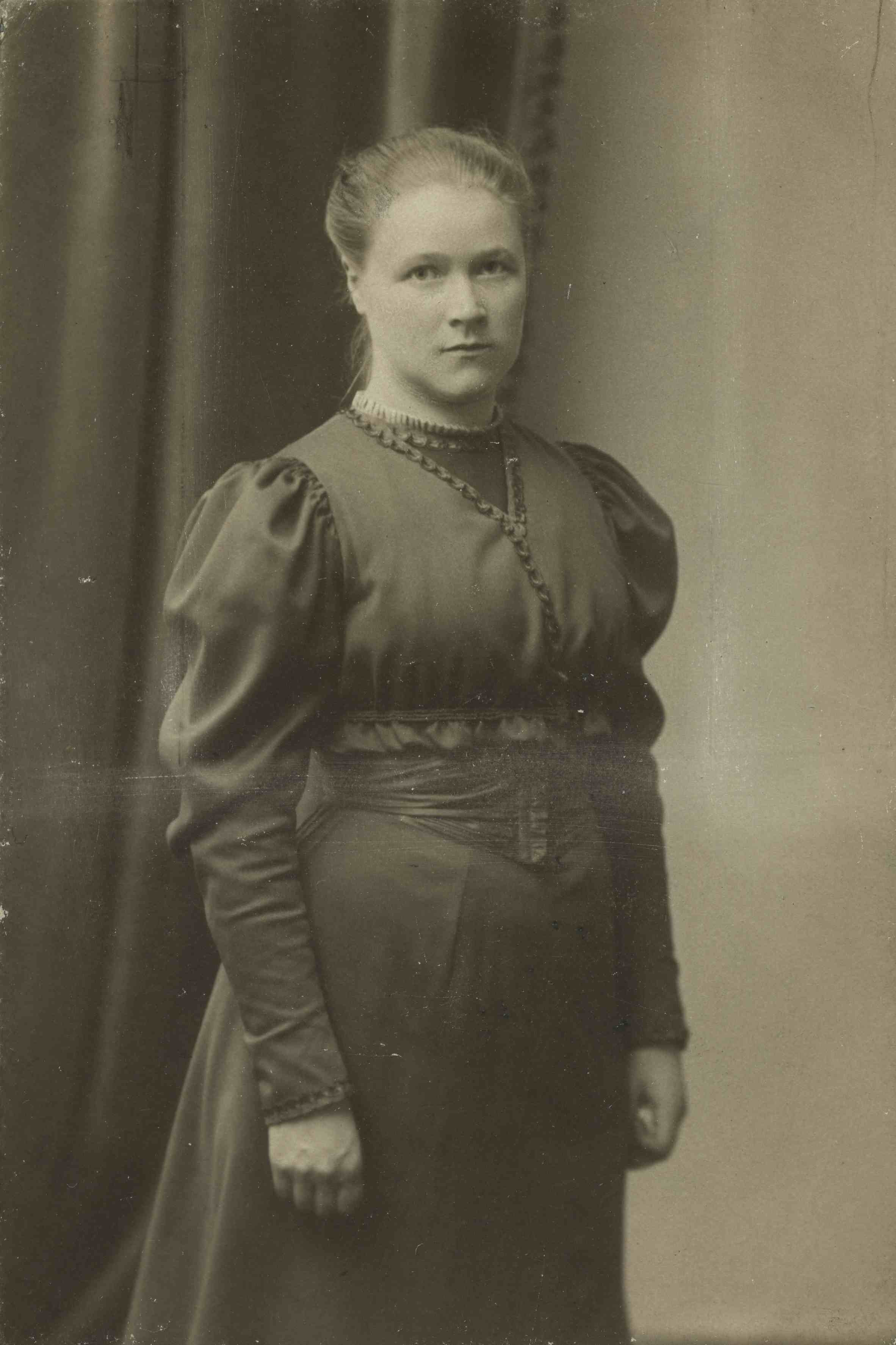

Member of the Parliament of Finland
- In office 1907–1918
- In office 1929–1935

Personal details
- Born: 13 July 1876 Halsua, Grand Duchy of Finland
- Died: 23 September 1935 (aged 59)
- Party: Finnish People's Delegation
- Occupation: Politician, schoolteacher, poet, journalist

Hilja Pärssinen (13 July 1876, in Halsua – 23 September 1935, in née Lindgren) was a Finnish schoolteacher, poet, journalist and politician. Along with Elvira Wilman and Hilda Tihlä was the most popular female writer in the labor movement. She served as a Member of the Parliament of Finland from 1907 to 1918 and again from 1929 until her death in 1935. During the Finnish Civil War in 1918, she was a member of the Finnish People's Delegation. After the defeat of the Red side, she fled at first to Soviet Russia and then to Estonia, from where she was extradited back to Finland in 1919 to receive a 12-year prison sentence for her role on the losing side of the Civil War. She was pardoned in 1923 and returned to politics.
