= Eveliina Ala-Kulju =

Finnish politician

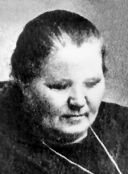
Eveliina Ala-Kulju

Eveliina Ala-Kulju (née Ojala; 27 October 1867, Lehtimäki – 3 June 1940) was a Finnish schoolteacher, farmer's wife and politician. She was a member of the Parliament of Finland from 1907 to 1910 and again from 1914 to 1919. She represented the Finnish Party until 1918 and the National Coalition Party from 1918 to 1919. Reino Ala-Kulju was her son.
