= Iida Vemmelpuu =

Finnish politician

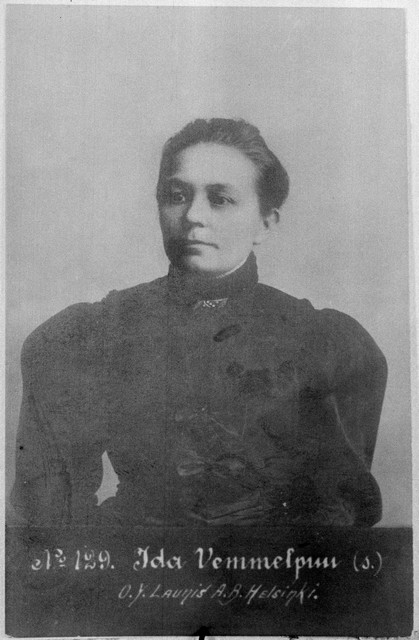
Iida Vemmelpuu in 1907.

Iida Maria Vemmelpuu (till 1906 Wilenius; 10 February 1868, Kangasala – 3 August 1924) was a Finnish schoolteacher and politician. She was a member of the Parliament of Finland from 1907 to 1909, representing the Finnish Party.
