= Alexandra Gripenberg =

Finnish social activist, author and politician (1857–1913)

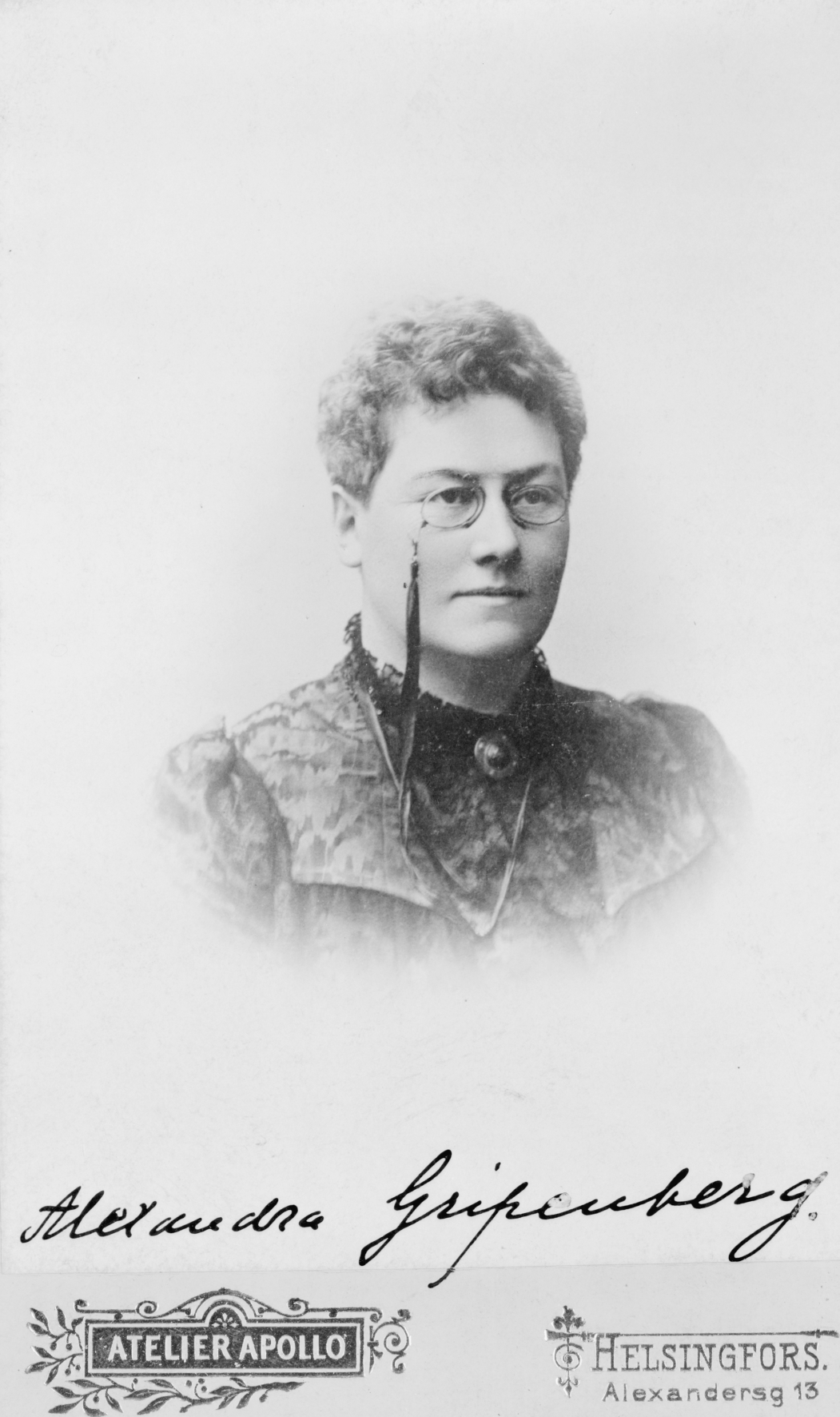
- Born: August 30, 1857; Kurkijoki, Grand Duchy of Finland
- Died: 24 December 1913; Helsinki, Grand Duchy of Finland
- Occupations: Author, editor, politician
- Known for: Women's rights activism, Fennoman movement

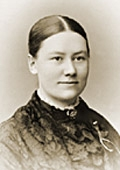
Alexandra Gripenberg

Alexandra Gripenberg (30 August 1857 in Kurkijoki, Viipuri Province – 24 December 1913 in Helsinki) was a Finnish social activist, author, editor, newspaper publisher, and elected politician, and was a leading voice within the movement for women's rights in Finland at the turn of the 20th century. She served as president of the Suomen Naisyhdistys (Finnish Women's Association) and was one of the nineteen women elected to the Parliament of Finland in 1907, among the first women ever to serve in a national parliament in Europe. She was also known as a Fennoman.

== Biography ==
Gripenberg was born in 1857 into a Finland-Swedish noble family, the second youngest of twelve siblings. Her father, Johan Ulrik Sebastian Gripenberg, died when she was twelve years old; the family had by then been living for several years at the Majby estate in Kirkkonummi. She was educated at home by her older sisters, and throughout her life she regretted having had no access to formal schooling, which later drove a sustained interest in educational questions and self-directed study.

As a young woman she worked for several years as a copyist in the household of the celebrated author Zacharias Topelius, at his home at Björkudden in Östersundom. The experience brought her into contact with his daughter Toini Topelius, with whom she struck up a lasting friendship; the two later co-edited the children's magazine Nya Trollsländan together for a number of years.

A period spent with her sister Elisabeth Stenius and brother-in-law in Kuopio proved a turning point. The couple moved in Finnish nationalist circles, giving Gripenberg her first sustained exposure to the Fennoman movement and to writers including Minna Canth and Juhani Aho. This contact with Fennoman ideas became one of the defining commitments of her life, and it was likely her sister who first kindled her interest in the women's cause as well.

== Women's rights ==
Gripenberg was instrumental in the establishment of the first official women's rights organization in Finland, the Suomen Naisyhdistys (Finnish Women's Association), in Helsinki in 1884 and became one of its active members. She served as the president of the association for two terms, 1889–1904 and 1909–1913.

In 1887 she travelled to England, intending to study English literature, but found herself drawn into women's rights circles there instead. From England she proceeded to Washington to attend a major international women's congress in March 1888, where delegates took up questions including co-education, temperance, charitable work, women in the professions, and suffrage. She remained in the United States for an extended period after the congress, travelling widely and giving lectures, and forged personal friendships with prominent figures in the American women's movement including Elizabeth Cady Stanton and Susan B. Anthony. The journey gave rise to her book A Half Year in the New World, published in 1889 and based on travel correspondence she had sent to Finnish newspapers during the trip.

The same year she also founded one of the earliest Finnish women's magazines, Koti ja Yhteiskunta, which was published until December 1911. Gripenberg was also the editor-in-chief of the magazine which acted as the organ of the Suomen Naisyhdistys. She served as the treasurer of the International Council of Women from 1893 to 1899.

== Politics ==
Finland granted women's suffrage in 1906. Gripenberg responded to the news with a degree of surprise and scepticism. In her view, the Finnish people were not yet ready for universal suffrage, and the outcome reflected the broader political circumstances in Finland more than it represented a victory for the women's movement. Nevertheless, Gripenberg was one of the nineteen women elected in 1907, making her one of the first women to get elected into the Parliament of Finland. She was elected through the conservative Finnish Party, which proved somewhat difficult for her at times as she was Swedish-speaking and the party was Finnish-speaking with strong grassroots support in the Finnish countryside. Gripenberg remained a member of the party until 1909.

Gripenberg had been diagnosed with diabetes in 1904, and her deteriorating health forced her to abandon plans to stand for re-election in 1909. She died in Helsinki on 24 December 1913.

== Publications ==
- Berättelser af Ringa (1877)
- Blind (1884)
- Strån (1884)
- Åtta timmars erfarenhet (1884)
- I tätnande led (1886)
- Tili Aavasaksa.(1886)
- Från läktaren (1887)
- Ett halfår i Nya verlden (1889)
- Qvinnofrågan (1890)
- Naiskysymyksessä (1890)
- Orjien vapauttaminen Pohjois-Amerikassa (1892)
- Reformarbetet till förbättrande af kvinnans ställning (1893-1903)
- Det röda folket (1894)
- Elizabeth Cady Stanton och kvinnosaksarbetet (1896)
- Zacharias Topelius (1899)
- England (1900)
- Skottland (1902)
- Irland (1903)
- Fredrika Runeberg (1904)
- Vaaliaikana (1906)
- Slöjdförhållanden i utlandet (1908)
- Makars äganderättsliga förhållanden i olika länder (1909)

== Bibliography ==
- Anna Moring (ed.). (2006). Politics of Gender: A Century of Women's Suffrage in Finland. Helsinki: Otava.
- Aura Korppi-Tommola. (1990). "Fighting Together for Freedom: Nationalism, Socialism, Feminism, and Women's Suffrage in Finland 1906." Journal of Scandinavian History 15: 181–91.
- Helen Rappaport. (2001). "Alexandra van Gripenberg." In Encyclopedia of Women Social Reformers, edited by Helen Rappaport. Santa Barbara: ABC-CLIO, 723–724.
- Riita Jallinoja. (1980). "The Women's Liberation Movement in Finland," Journal of Scandinavian History 5: 36–49.
