= Finnish Women's Association =

Finnish women's rights organisation

The Finnish Women's Association (Finnish: Suomen Naisyhdistys ry, Swedish: Finsk kvinnoförening) is a Finnish women's rights organisation. It was founded in 1884, and is the oldest women's movement organisation in Finland. The organization was the publisher of a women's magazine, Koti ja Yhteiskunta (1889–1911), which was edited by Alexandra Gripenberg. It is a member of the International Alliance of Women, that has general consultative status with the United Nations.

== Presidents ==
- Elisabeth Löfgren 1884–1889
- Alexandra Gripenberg 1889–1904
- Elin Sjöström 1904–1909
- Alexandra Gripenberg 1909–1913
- Ilmi Hallstén 1913–1937
- Armi Hallstén-Kallia 1937–1955
- Kerttu Sihvonen 1955–1960
- Tyyni Tuulio 1960-1970
