= Naisasialiitto Unioni =

Finnish women's organization

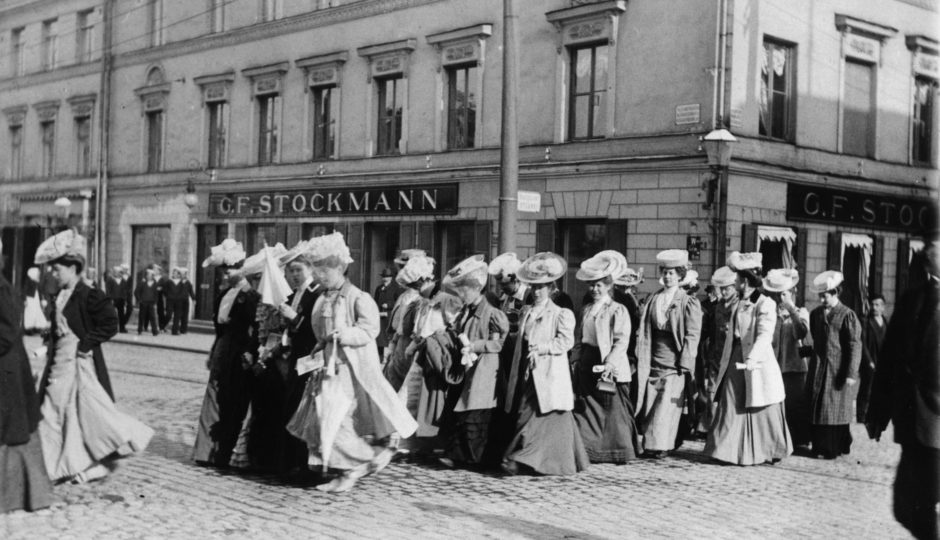
Group of suffragists in Helsinki, c.1900

Naisasialiitto Unioni (Finnish) or Kvinnosaksförbundet Unionen (Swedish), sometimes referred to in English as the League of Finnish Feminists, is a non-profit Finnish women's rights organization which was established in 1892. Since 1904 it has been the Finnish arm of the International Alliance of Women.

The co-founders were Lucina Hagman, Maikki Friberg and Venny Soldan-Brofeldt. Unioni was initially concerned with women's voting rights (granted in 1906), equal pay, education and combatting prostitution. More recently, it has striven to improve the social status of women and to increase the number of women who are active in politics. Today the association exerts influence on political discussions, seeks to improve women's rights and works against oppression.

Compared to similar organizations in other countries, membership, at under 2,000 was rather low. By contrast, there were some 20,000 women in the Finnish temperance association in the early 20th century and almost as many in the women workers' movement.

== Presidents ==
- Lucina Hagman 1893–1908 (first time)
- Annie Furuhjelm 1908–1913
- Lucina Hagman 1913–1920 (second time)
- Maikki Friberg 1920–1927
- Thyra von Beetzen-Östman 1928–1938
- Märta von Alfthan 1939–1948
