= Jaakko Mäki =

Finnish politician (1878–1938)

- Яакко Мя́ки
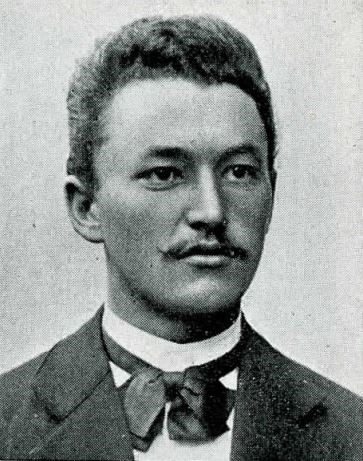

Member of the Parliament of Finland
- In office 1 August 1908 – 25 September 1918
- Constituency: Vaasa Province South

Personal details
- Born: Jaakko Kaunismäki; 2 January 1878 Kokkola, Ilmajoki, Russian Empire
- Died: 14 January 1938 (aged 60) Petroskoi, Soviet Union
- Party: Social Democratic Party of Finland
- Occupation: Coppersmith

Jaakko Mäki (Russian: Яакко Туомасович Мя́ки, romanized: Yaakko Tuomasovych Myáky; 2 January 1878 – 14 January 1938) was a Finnish coppersmith, politician and member of the Parliament of Finland, the national legislature of Finland. A member of the Social Democratic Party, he represented Vaasa Province South between August 1908 and September 1918. Mäki went to Soviet Russia during the Finnish Civil War and was executed there in January 1938 during Stalin's Great Purge.

== Early life ==
Mäki was born on 2 January 1878 in Kokkola in Ilmajoki municipality in western Grand Duchy of Finland. He was the son of a farmer and attended public school for a couple of years as well as vocational evening class. Mäki moved to Helsinki where he worked as a labourer on construction sites and joined the copper-tin-roofing trade union. He was later an apprentice coppersmith at M. F. Hätinen's workshop in Helsinki and received a diploma in the vocation in 1900. He also received a degree from the Central School of the Arts.

Mäki worked as a coppersmith in Helsinki and Ilmajoki. He became involved in the protests against the policies of Russian Governor Nikolay Bobrikov. In April 1902 he was involved in the street riots in Senate Square, Helsinki in which he threw a stone at a police officer, rendering him unconscious. Mäki fled to the USA where he held various jobs between 1902 and 1905.

Returning to Finland on the eve of the Russian Revolution of 1905, Mäki acquired a plot of land in Huissinkylä in Ilmajoki and worked as a farmhand and blacksmith from 1905 until 1918. He was active in the co-operative movement in Huissinkylä and was a founding member of the Huissinkylä labour association.

== Politics and civil war ==
Mäki joined the Social Democratic Party (SDP) in 1899. He was considered a good orator and was a regular speaker at party events. He was elected to the Parliament of Finland at the 1908 parliamentary election. He was re-elected at the 1909, 1910, 1911, 1913, 1916 and 1917 parliamentary elections. His main focus in parliament was reform of crofting law and was willing to work with bourgeoisie (right-wing) parties to achieve political consensus for change.

During World War I Finland became dependent on imported grain from Russia but these imports were interrupted by the February Revolution of 1917. Thus, when agricultural strikes began in Finland in May 1917, parties across the political spectrum recognised the importance of resolving them. The Senate appointed Mäki to a committee to mediate in labour disputes between agricultural workers and employers. In the summer of 1917, as the grain shortage and inflation worsened, particularly in cities, the relationship between urban workers and rural landowners/farmers became more antagonistic, inside and outside parliament. Workers accused farmers of hoarding food and landowners of profiteering from the war. In a parliamentary speech, Mäki accused Agrarian League leader Santeri Alkio of encouraging farmers to hoard and warned that workers wouldn't be allowed to die of hunger whilst granaries remained full.

Mäki was chairman of the SDP parliamentary group from 1917 to 1918. When parliament reconvened in November 1917 following the parliamentary election, the parliamentary leadership, which consisted solely of bourgeoisie parties despite the SDP being the largest party in parliament, suggested that the powers of the Russian Tsar be transferred to a three-member regency council. Mäki strongly objected to this and instead presented the Me vaadimme (We Demand) programme which, amongst other things, called for the publication of the Valtalaki constitutional law, eight-hour working laws and the abolition of the paramilitary guardianship councils (the precursor to the White Guards).

Mäki participated in the meetings of the Workers' Revolutionary Central which had been formed in November 1917 by the SDP, Red Guards and Helsinki Workers Council. He did not however take part in the council vote that called a general strike for 14 November 1917. Just prior to the general strike, Mäki and Aleksanteri Vasten travelled to Petrograd to procure weapons for the Red Guards but returned to Finland empty handed. Mäki had been highly critical of the fire brigades established by right-wing independence activists and had wanted the Red Guards established to protect workers. These fire brigades were the precursors to the paramilitary guardianship councils.

Mäki, like many SDP MPs, had opposed armed conflict and in January 1918 gave a speech in Ilmajoki in which he condemned all violence. The White Guard in Ilmajoki tried to arrest him but Mäki hid in Jurva before making it to the Red side. His son-in-law was amongst the White Guards pursuing him. On 28 January 1918, a number of MPs including Mäki were arrested by the Red Guards as they were on their way to a meeting of parliament at the House of the Estates and taken to Aleksanterinkatu police station for questioning.

Following the Finnish Revolution in January 1918, Mäki was appointed commissioner of the Agricultural Affairs Department in the Finnish People's Delegation's (the revolutionary government). He was also appointed to the board of the Bank of Finland. In March 1918, after the delegate (minister) for agriculture Evert Eloranta was transferred to the Red Guards, Mäki was appointed as Eloranta's deputy to take over his duties.

The tide of the war turned against the Reds in March 1918: Soviet Russia withdrew from Finland in accordance with the Treaty of Brest-Litovsk and the Imperial German Army invaded Finland to support the Whites. Mäki and Feliks Kellosalmi tried unsuccessfully to start peace negotiations, going against the official policy of the revolutionary government. As the Reds faced defeat, the revolutionary government moved from Helsinki to Viipuri in April 1918. The number of commissioners was reduced and Mäki was reassigned to the maintenance department. He was also appointed deputy head of the department for evacuation.

== Exile and death ==
Mäki arrived in Petrograd in Soviet Russia on 29 April 1918. He was accepted as a member of the Russian Communist Party (Bolsheviks) (RKP(b)). He was also a member of the Provisional Central Committee of the Communist Party of Finland. He was a private in the Red Army.

Mäki moved to Petroskoi (Petrozavodsk) in 1920 and was head of the Agricultural Affairs Department for the Karelian Labor Commune. He was director of the Finnish-speaking department of the RKP(b)'s regional committee in the Karelian Labor Commune from October 1921. He was director of an agitation school (1921) and an interrogator for the Petroskoi Maintenance Commission (1921). He was on the editorial boards of the Kommunisti (1922) and Vapaus (1924) magazines.

Mäki was secretary of the RKP(b)'s committee in Uhtua District (Kalevalsky District) from 1924 to 1929 and a member of the party's Executive Central Committee in Karelia. From 1930 to 1934 he was party leader of the reform administration of the People's Commissariat in Petroskoi and a representative of the Urban District Committee of the Central Bureau of the All-Union Communist Party (Bolsheviks) VKP(b). He was chairman of the VKP(b)'s executive committee in Uhtua District from 1934 to 1935. He was also director of the state farm in Besovets and a bakery in Olonets.

With the onset of Stalin's Great Purge, Mäki was expelled from the communist party and dismissed from all positions in 1935. He was imprisoned on 29 July 1937 for counter-revolutionary activities and on 4 January 1938 sentenced to death by shooting. He was executed on 14 January 1938 in the outskirts of Petroskoi. He was posthumously rehabilitated in September 1956 and his communist party membership restored in December 1969.

Mäki's grandon Pertti Mäki has published two books about his grandfather - Jaakko Mäen kova kohtalo Stalinin terrorissa (1996) and Karjalan tasavalta 100 vuotta (2019).

== Personal life ==
Mäki had four children in Finland - Veikko, Toivo, Helmi and Hilda. He was later married to Soviet citizen Eeva.

== See also ==
- List of Finnish MPs imprisoned for political reasons
