= Matti Lonkainen =

Finnish politician (1874–1918)

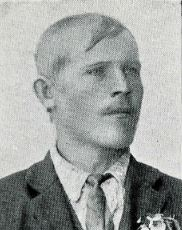

Member of the Parliament of Finland
- In office 1 June 1909 – 16 May 1918
- Constituency: Kuopio Province East

Personal details
- Born: 14 April 1874 Tohmajärvi, Russian Empire
- Died: 14 November 1918 (aged 44) Helsinki, Finland
- Party: Social Democratic Party of Finland
- Occupation: Smallholder

Matti Pekanpoika Lonkainen (14 April 1874 – 14 November 1918) was a Finnish smallholder, politician and member of the Parliament of Finland, the national legislature of Finland. A member of the Social Democratic Party, he represented Kuopio Province East between June 1909 and May 1918. He died in captivity following the Finnish Civil War.

== Early life ==
Lonkainen was born on 14 April 1874 in Tohmajärvi in the south-east of the Grand Duchy of Finland. Following the death of his father in 1880 Lonkainen was forced to beg. He worked on the railways, as a stonemason and as farm worker in Tohmajärvi. He was a smallholder in Värtsilä.

Lonkainen was married to Helena. Their daughter Kerttu died in August 1907 aged eight months.

== Politics, civil war and death ==
Lonkainen joined the Social Democratic Party (SDP) around 1904. He was elected to the Parliament of Finland at the 1909 parliamentary election. He was re-elected at the 1910, 1911, 1913, 1916 and 1917 parliamentary elections.

Following the Finnish Revolution, Lonkainen was elected to the Central Workers' Council of Finland, the legislature of the Finnish Socialist Workers' Republic (the Reds), without his knowledge or consent. He did not attend any session of the Central Workers' Council.

In April 1918, as the bitter Finnish Civil War drew to a conclusion, leading SDP members who had not participated in the revolution, including Lonkainen, published a declaration condemning the revolutionaries. This did not protect Lonkainen from the retribution meted out against SDP members by the victorious Whites following the end of the civil war.

In early May 1918 the Whites published a list of leaders of the "Red Rebellion" (the failed Finnish Revolution) which included 37 SDP MPs: Lonkainen was included on the list due to his membership of the Central Workers' Council. On 14 May 1918 White prosecutor Immi Savonius announded that 56 SDP MPs, including Lonkainen, would be charged with treason and ordered their arrest. Lonkainen and five other SDP MPs submitted a notice to the White parliamentary authorities stating that they had not taken part in the rebellion.

Lonkainen was arrested on 16 May 1918 by White military intelligence in front of the parliament building while on the way to a parliamentary session. He was taken initially to intelligence headquarters on Vuorimiehenkatu 1 before being imprisoned in Helsinki County Prison. Lonkainen denied the charge of rebellion during interrogation by the city prosecutor Adolf Mesterton. The prosecutor gave written testimony that Lonkainen's statements were credible.

The White authorities continued with Lonkainen's prosecution for treason despite Mesterton's testimony. They claimed that he was involved in the production and approval of the Me vaadimme (We Demand) declaration published by the SDP on 1 November 1917. The also claimed that he was aware that there was a threat of rebellion, that he agitated for rebellion and that he belonged to the Central Workers' Council, the highest council of the revolutionaries. Lonkainen denied ever attending a session of the Central Workers' Council and claimed that he had never agitated for rebellion and that he had opposed Me vaadimme internally. On 12 October 1918 the 28th Department of the State Criminal Court (Valtiorikosoikeus) handed down sentences to 40 SDP MPs for treason and high treason. Lonkainen was found guilty of preparation for high treason and sentenced to two years imprisonment and lost his civic rights for six years.

Lonkainen had been ill for some time and was transferred from Sörnäinen Prison to Helsinki Surgical Hospital, where he died on 14 November 1918. According to the White medical authorities his death had been caused by appendicitis.

== See also ==
- List of Finnish MPs imprisoned for political reasons
