= Jussi Merinen =

Finnish politician (1873–1918)

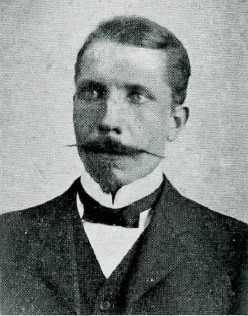

Member of the Parliament of Finland
- In office 22 May 1907 – 31 July 1908
- Constituency: Turku Province North

Personal details
- Born: Juho Rikard Mustelin; 20 October 1873 Tyrvää, Russian Empire
- Died: 20 April 1918 (aged 44) Tyrvää, Finland
- Party: Social Democratic Party of Finland
- Occupation: Carpenter

Juho Rikard Merinen (20 October 1873 – 20 April 1918) was a Finnish trade unionist, politician and member of the Parliament of Finland, the national legislature of Finland. A member of the Social Democratic Party, he represented Turku Province North between May 1907 and July 1908. He was executed by the White Guard during the Finnish Civil War.

== Early life ==
Merinen was born on 20 (Note: Other sources give Merinen's date of birth as 29 October 1873.) October 1873 in Tyrvää. He was educated at folk school and Satakunta Agricultural Society's sculpture school. He worked as a carpenter and a farmhand in Tyrvää.

== Trade unionism, politics and death ==
The Stormi Workers' Association (Stormin työväenyhdistystä) was founded in May 1906. Merinen, together with his brother August Merinen and Kalle Tyrvää from Laukula, were the key figures behind the association and Jussi was its first chairman. Merinen was a speaker at the first general crofters meeting (Ensimmäinen yleinen torpparikokous) organised by the Social Democratic Party in 1906. He was elected to the Parliament of Finland at the 1907 parliamentary election. He also contested the 1908, 1913 and 1917 parliamentary elections.

Following the outbreak of the Finnish Civil War, the local branch of the social democrats took over the function of the local municipal council. None of the members of the Stormi Workers' Association met with the local Red delegation nor were they appointed to the institutions set up by delegation. Stormi Workers' Association members weren't Red Guard officers either. Later, the Red Guards established a regional council in Stormi, primarily for civil administration purposes, which included members of the Stormi Workers' Association.

After their victory in the Battle of Karkku in April 1918, most of the leaders of the Stormi Workers' Association were killed by the White Guard. Merinen was executed by the White Guard on 20 April 1918 in Tyrvää. He was buried at Tyrvää Church. In September 2018 a new monument to 527 Reds killed in the civil war, including Merinen, was inaugurated at Tyrvää Church.

== See also ==
- List of MPs in Finland imprisoned for political reasons
