= Christian Workers' Union of Finland =

Christian Workers' Union of Finland Suomen Kristillisen Työväen Liitto Finlands kristliga arbetarförbund
- Founded: 1906
- Dissolved: 1922
- Merged into: Social Democratic Party
- Ideology: Christian socialism
- Political position: Left-wing
- Religion: Christianity

The Christian Workers' Union of Finland (Finnish: Suomen Kristillisen Työväen Liitto; Swedish: Finlands kristliga arbetarförbund, abbreviated SKrTL) was a political party in Finland. The party was led by the industrial worker Antti Kaarne until 1918.

== History ==
The party was founded in 1906, in the aftermath of the 1905 general strike. It had a radical Christian socialist profile. The program of the party was largely similar as that of the Social Democratic Party, but it could not reconcile with the atheism of the Social Democrats. The motto of the party was to "on the basis of the Christian faith, liberate our people from the oppression of capital".

In the early years of the party, two distinct tendencies were active in its membership; a tendency dominated by priests that hoped that the party would enable them to win allies in the struggle against atheism, and a tendency led by Antti Kaarne that sought to implement social reforms on the basis of Christian principles. Soon, however, the clergy-based faction was marginalised in the competition over the orientation of the party.

In the 1907 elections, the party won two seats in the Eduskunta and was represented in the assembly by Kaarne and Matti Helenius-Seppälä. The party retained both seats in the 1908 elections, but was reduced to a single seat in the 1909 elections. The SKrTL retained a single seat in elections in 1910 and 1911, but lost their parliamentary representation in the 1913 elections.

The 1916 elections saw the party regain a single seat, which it lost in the elections a year later.

In 1917 the party changed its name to Christian Workers Party (Kristillinen työväenpuolue). During its later years, Helenius-Seppälä played an important role in shaping the ideological profile of the party. The activities of the party were disrupted by the Finnish Civil War. The party maintained a policy of neutrality in the war, but it was interpreted by the Whites as having sided with the Reds.

The party won two seats in 1919 but did not contest any further elections. The party was dissolved as its key leaders joined the Social Democrats.

== Election results ==
=== Parliament ===
Election	Votes	%	+/–	Seats	+/–	Rank	Status
1907	13,790	1.55	New	2 / 200	New	6th	Opposition
1908	18,848	2.33	▲0.78	2 / 200	0	6th	Opposition
1909	23,259	2.75	▲0.42	1 / 200	▼1	6th	Opposition
1910	17,344	2.19	▼0.56	1 / 200	0	6th	Opposition
1911	17,245	2.15	▼0.04	1 / 200	0	6th	Opposition
1913	12,850	1.77	▼0.38	0 / 200	▼1	6th	Extra-parliamentary
1916	14,626	1.84	▲0.07	1 / 200	▲1	6th	Opposition
1917	15,489	1.56	▼0.28	0 / 200	▼1	▲5th	Extra-parliamentary
1919	14,718	1.53	▼0.03	2 / 200	▲2	▼6th	Opposition
1922	Did not run.						
