= 1908 Finnish parliamentary election =

← 1907	1–2 July 1908	1909 →

All 200 seats in the Parliament of Finland 101 seats needed for a majority
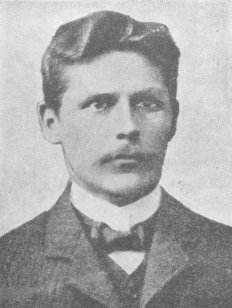

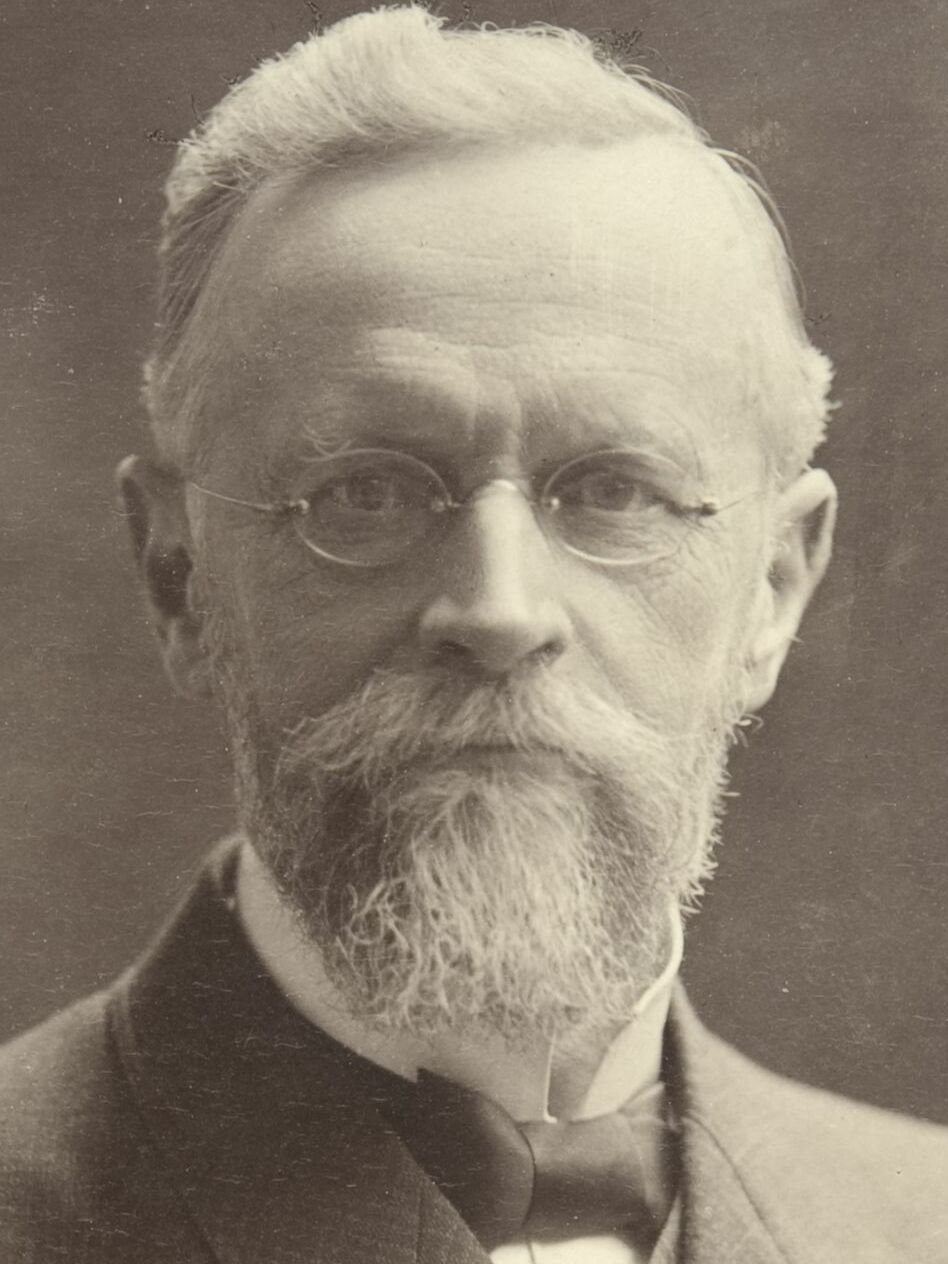

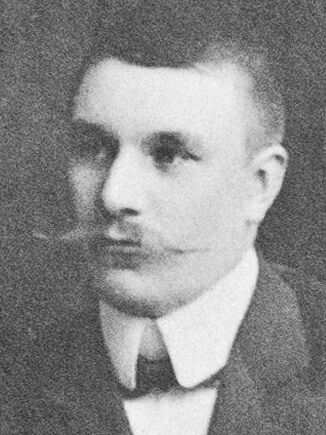

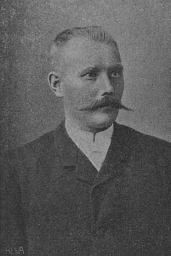
	First party	Second party	Third party
Leader	Edvard Valpas-Hänninen
Party	SDP	Finnish	Young Finnish
Last election	37.03%, 80 seats	27.34%, 59 seats	13.65%, 26 seats
Seats won	83	55	26
Seat change	▲3	▼4	Steady
Popular vote	310,826	205,892	115,201
Percentage	38.40%	25.44%	14.23%
Swing	▲1.37pp	▼1.90pp	▲0.58pp
	Fourth party	Fifth party	Sixth party
Leader	Axel Lille	Otto Karhi	Antti Kaarne
Party	RKP	Agrarian	SKrTL
Last election	12.60%, 24 seats	5.75%, 9 seats	1.55%, 2 seats
Seats won	24	10	2
Seat change	Steady	▲1	Steady
Popular vote	103,146	51,756	18,848
Percentage	12.74%	5.75%	2.33%
Swing	▲0.14pp	▲0.64pp	▲0.78pp

Parliamentary elections were held in the Grand Duchy of Finland on 1 and 2 July 1908.

== Background ==
The Russian Tsar Nicholas II dissolved the first modern and democratic Finnish Parliament after its Speaker, Pehr Evind Svinhufvud, refused, in the Tsar's opinion, to show enough respect for him when speaking at the parliamentary session's opening. In 1908, the Russian government restarted its Russification policy in Finland, limiting Finnish self-government.

== Campaign ==
Most Finns, including most Finnish parliamentarians, opposed the Russification, but disagreed on the means to effectively oppose it. The Social Democratic Party's supporters hoped for positive results from their party's work in Parliament, such as the growing prosperity of workers and tenant farmers, but would be disappointed during the next several elections. The other parliamentary parties, with the partial exception of the Agrarians, considered the Social Democrats' demands, such as an eight-hour workday, too radical to be implemented while Finland was trying to save its self-government. Parliament had no official control over the government, which was responsible only to the Tsar and to the Governor-General. Parliament's legislative power was also limited by the Tsar's ability to veto its laws, without a time limit on his consideration whether to veto the laws or not.

== Results ==
Party	Votes	%	Seats	+/–
Social Democratic Party	310,826	38.40	83	+3
Finnish Party	205,892	25.44	54	–4
Young Finnish Party	115,201	14.23	27	0
Swedish People's Party	103,146	12.74	25	0
Agrarian League	51,756	6.39	9	+1
Christian Workers' Union	18,848	2.33	2	0
Others	3,772	0.47	0	–
Total	809,441	100.00	200	0
Valid votes	809,441	99.03		
Invalid/blank votes	7,896	0.97		
Total votes	817,337	100.00		
Registered voters/turnout	1,269,177	64.40		
Source: Mackie & Rose
