= 1911 Finnish parliamentary election =

← 1910	2–3 January 1911	1913 →

All 200 seats in the Parliament of Finland 101 seats needed for a majority
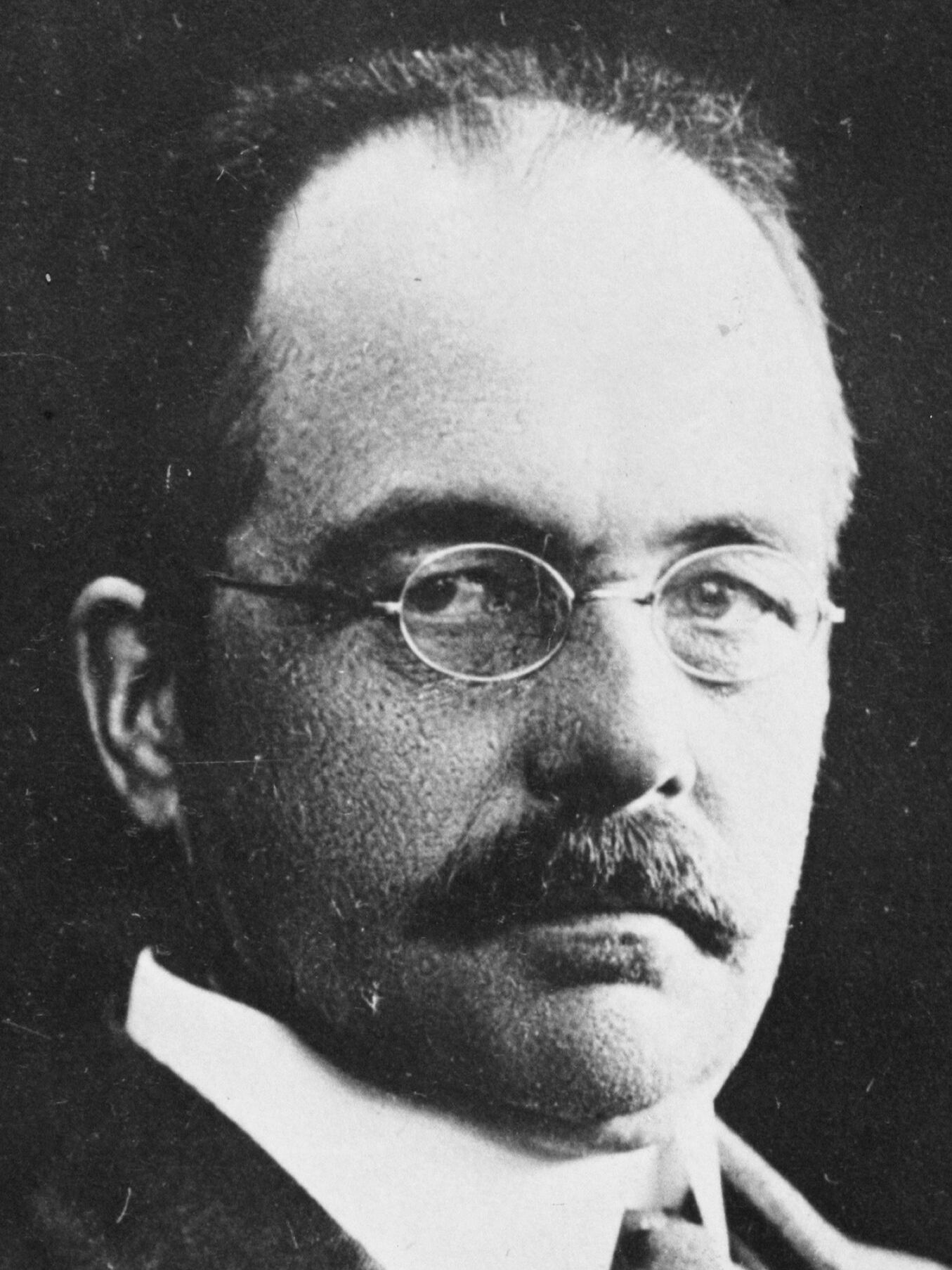

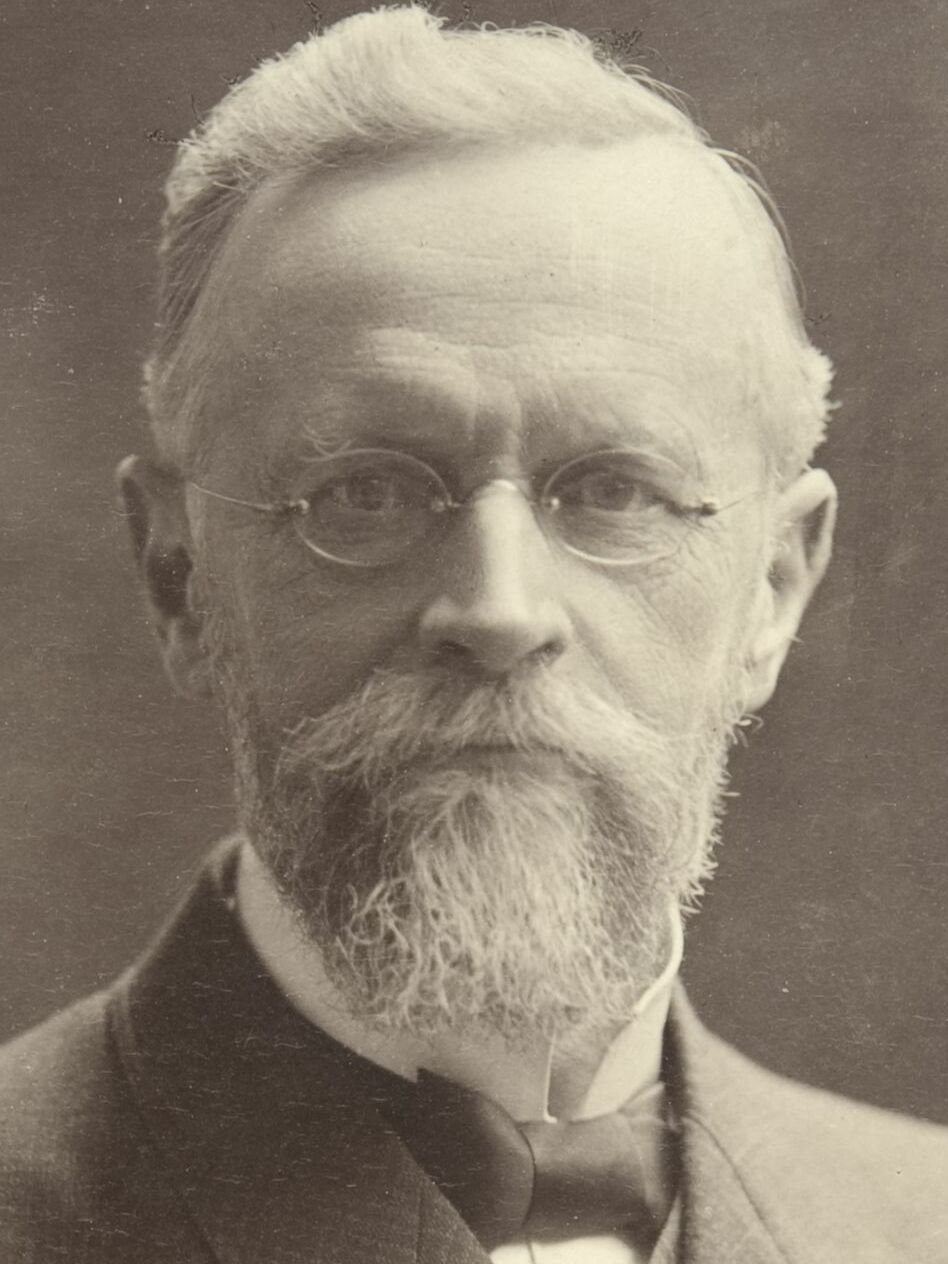

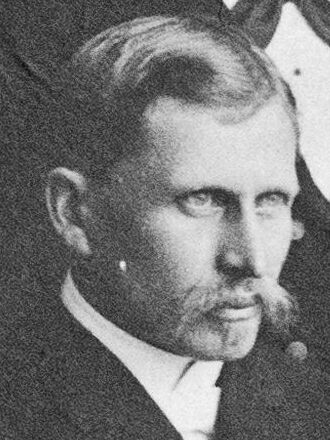

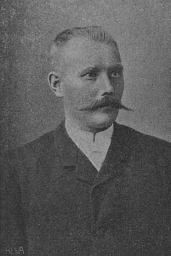
	First party	Second party	Third party
Leader	Matti Paasivuori
Party	SDP	Finnish	Young Finnish
Last election	40.04%, 86 seats	22.07%, 42 seats	14.44%, 28 seats
Seats won	86	43	28
Seat change	Steady	▲1	Steady
Popular vote	321,201	174,177	119,361
Percentage	40.03%	21.71%	14.88%
Swing	▼0.01pp	▼0.36pp	▲0.44pp
	Fourth party	Fifth party	Sixth party
Leader	Axel Lille	Kyösti Kallio	Antti Kaarne
Party	RKP	Agrarian	SKrTL
Last election	13.53%, 26 seats	7.60%, 17 seats	2.19%, 1 seat
Seats won	26	16	1
Seat change	Steady	▼1	Steady
Popular vote	106,810	62,885	17,245
Percentage	13.31%	7.84%	2.15%
Swing	▼0.22pp	▲0.24pp	▼0.04pp

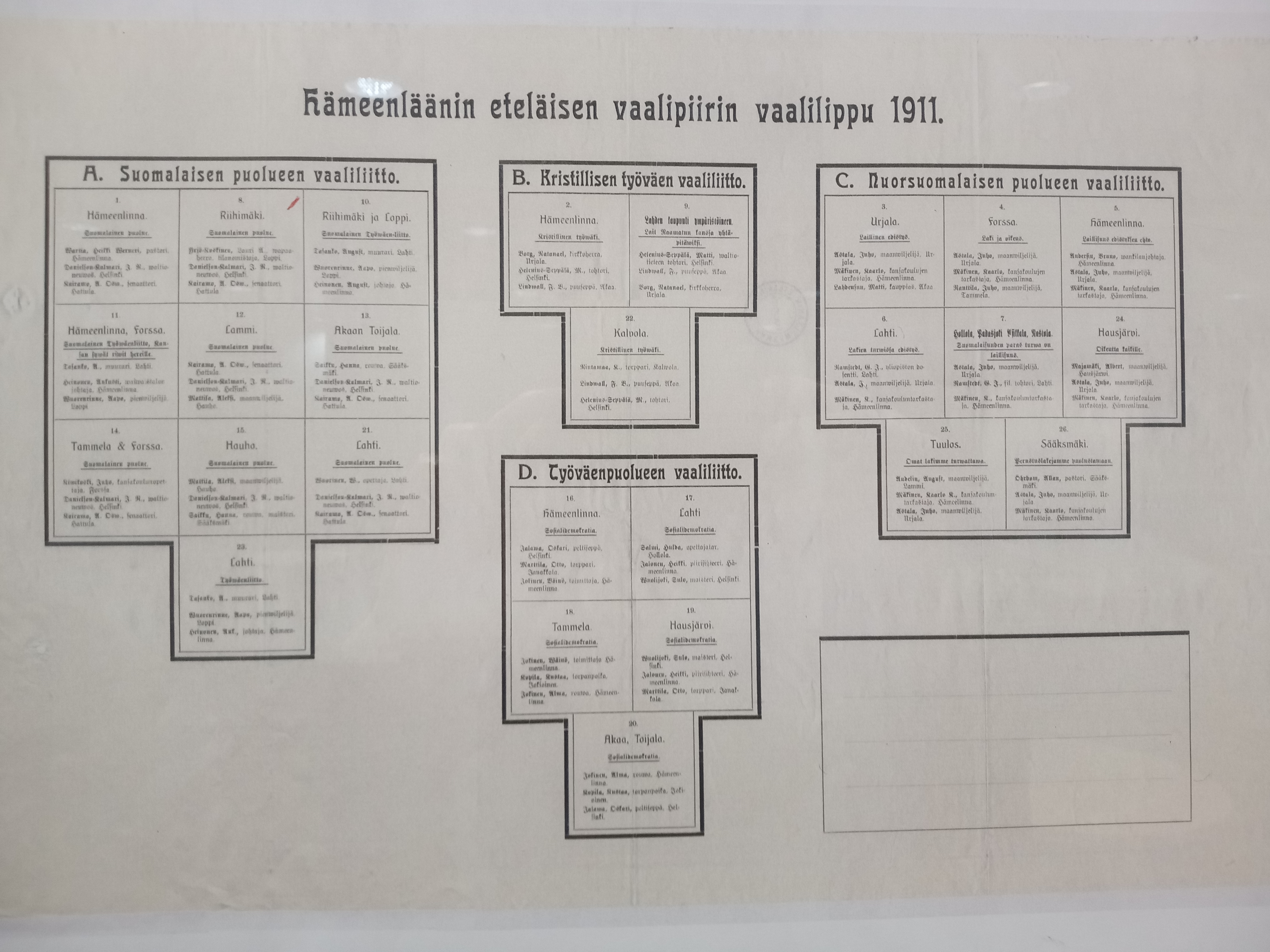
Ballot paper

Parliamentary elections were held in the Grand Duchy of Finland on 2 and 3 January 1911.

== Results ==
Party	Votes	%	Seats	+/–
Social Democratic Party	321,201	40.03	86	0
Finnish Party	174,177	21.71	43	+1
Young Finnish Party	119,361	14.88	28	0
Swedish People's Party	106,810	13.31	26	0
Agrarian League	62,885	7.84	16	–1
Christian Workers' Union	17,245	2.15	1	0
Others	708	0.09	0	–
Total	802,387	100.00	200	0
Valid votes	802,387	99.42		
Invalid/blank votes	4,707	0.58		
Total votes	807,094	100.00		
Registered voters/turnout	1,350,058	59.78		
Source: Mackie & Rose
