= 1909 Finnish parliamentary election =

← 1908	1–3 May 1909	1910 →

All 200 seats in the Parliament of Finland 101 seats needed for a majority
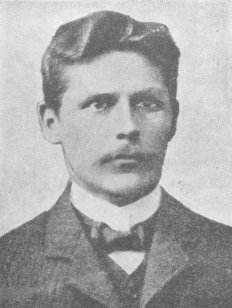

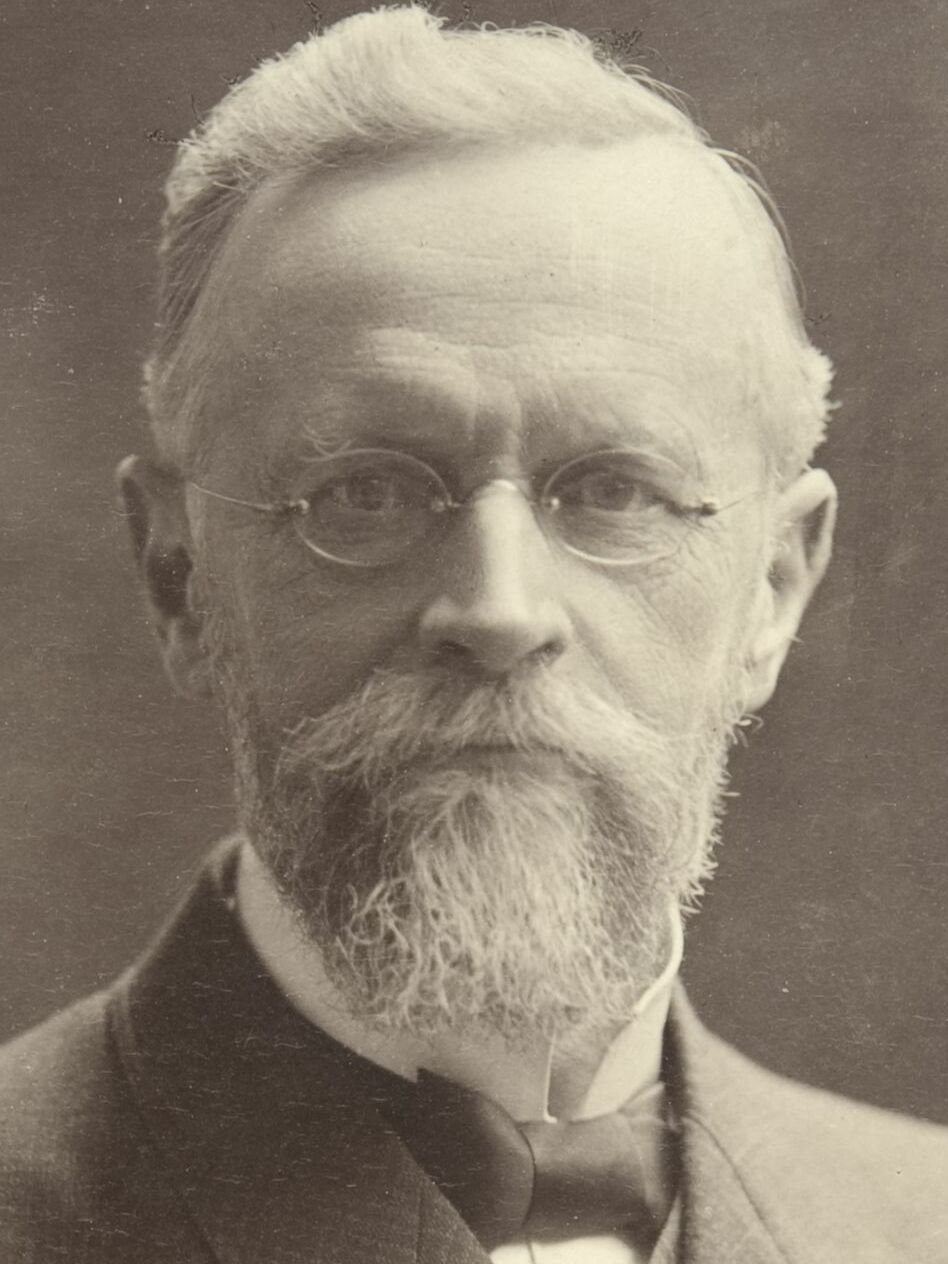

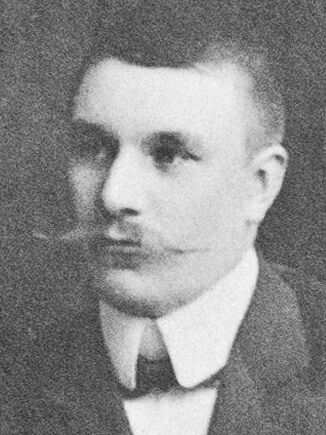

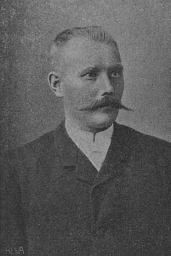
	First party	Second party	Third party
Leader	Edvard Valpas-Hänninen
Party	SDP	Finnish	Young Finnish
Last election	38.40%, 83 seats	25.44%, 55 seats	14.23%, 26 seats
Seats won	84	48	29
Seat change	▲1	▼7	▲3
Popular vote	337,685	199,920	122,770
Percentage	39.89%	23.62%	14.50%
Swing	▲1.49pp	▼1.82pp	▲0.27pp
	Fourth party	Fifth party	Sixth party
Leader	Axel Lille	Otto Karhi	Antti Kaarne
Party	RKP	Agrarian	SKrTL
Last election	12.74%, 24 seats	6.31%, 10 seats	2.33%, 2 seats
Seats won	25	13	1
Seat change	▲1	▲3	▼1
Popular vote	104,191	56,943	23,259
Percentage	12.31%	6.73%	2.75%
Swing	▼0.43pp	▲0.34pp	▲0.42pp

Parliamentary elections were held in the Grand Duchy of Finland between 1 and 3 May 1909.

== Results ==
Party	Votes	%	Seats	+/–
Social Democratic Party	337,685	39.89	84	+1
Finnish Party	199,920	23.62	48	–7
Young Finnish Party	122,770	14.50	29	+3
Swedish People's Party	104,191	12.31	25	+1
Agrarian League	56,943	6.73	13	+3
Christian Workers' Union	23,259	2.75	1	–1
Others	1,703	0.20	0	–
Total	846,471	100.00	200	0
Valid votes	846,471	99.27		
Invalid/blank votes	6,212	0.73		
Total votes	852,683	100.00		
Registered voters/turnout	1,305,305	65.32		
Source: Mackie & Rose
