= 1910 Finnish parliamentary election =

← 1909	1–2 February 1910	1911 →

All 200 seats in the Parliament of Finland 101 seats needed for a majority
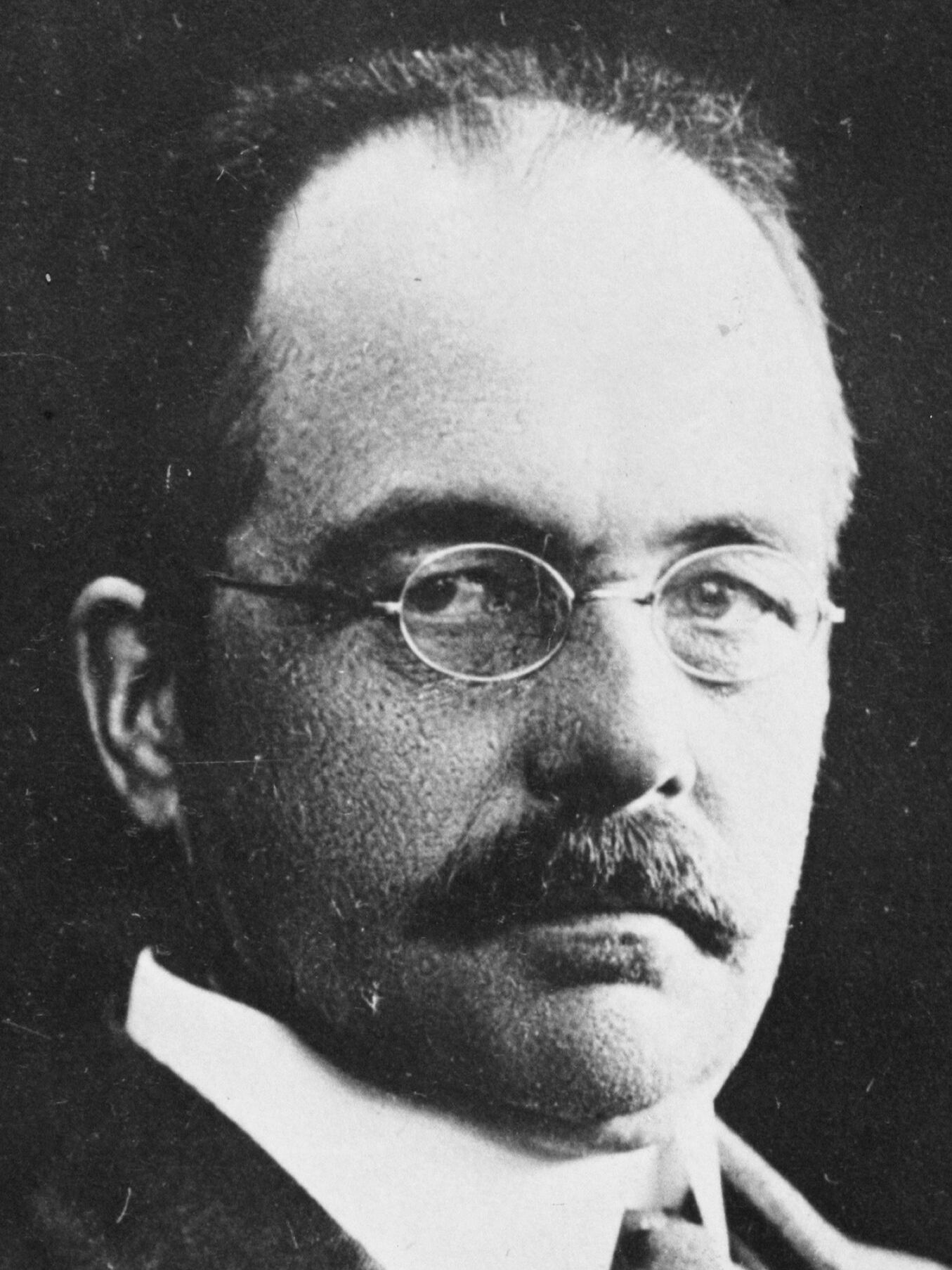

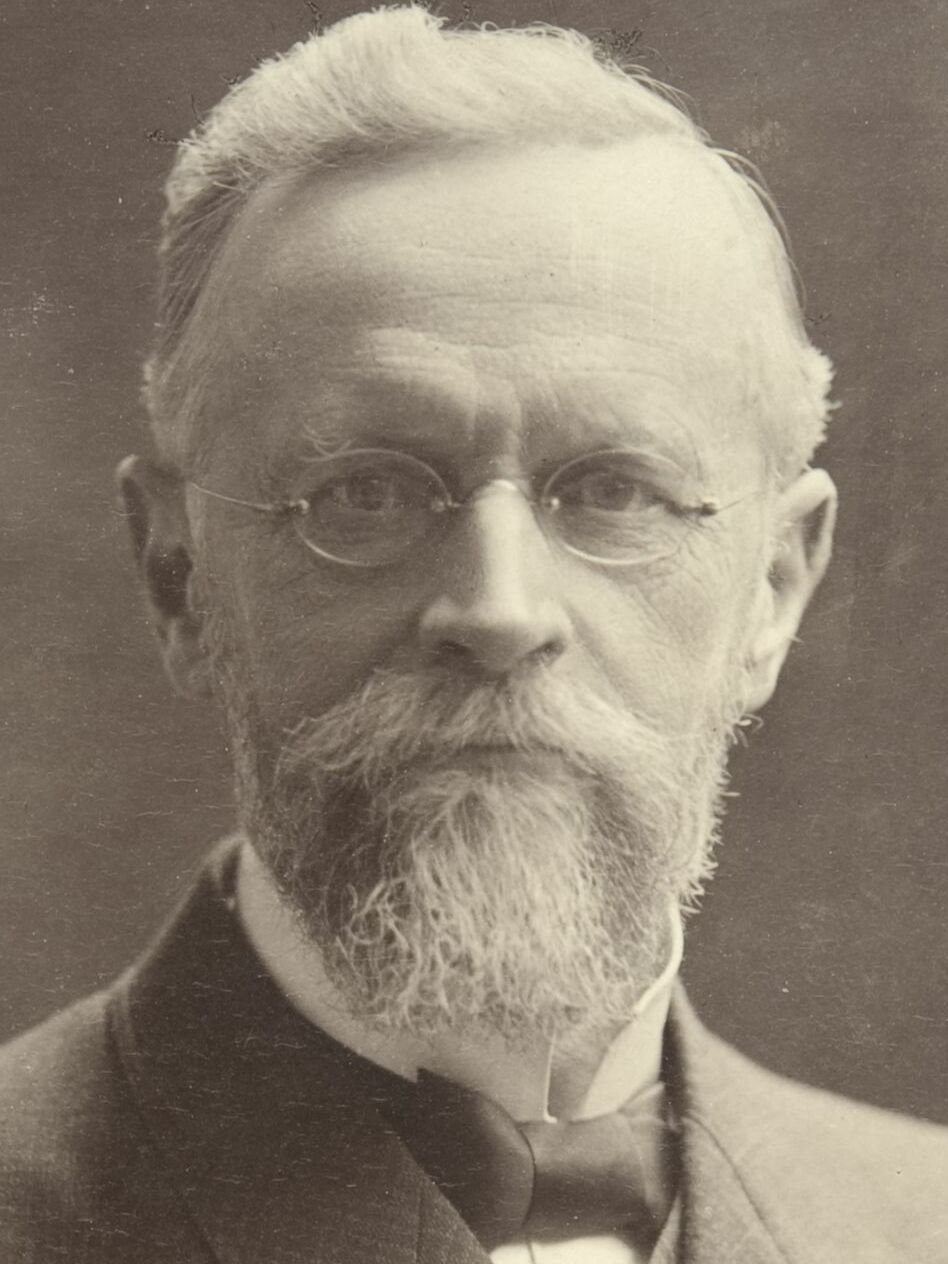

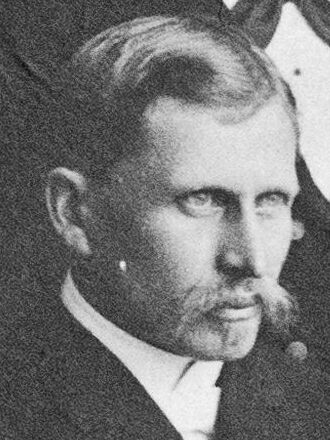

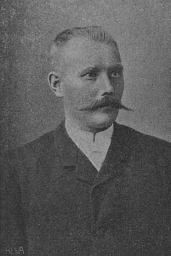
	First party	Second party	Third party
Leader	Matti Paasivuori
Party	SDP	Finnish	Young Finnish
Last election	39.89%, 84 seats	23.62%, 48 seats	14.50%, 29 seats
Seats won	86	42	28
Seat change	▲2	▼6	▼1
Popular vote	316,951	174,661	114,291
Percentage	40.04%	22.07%	14.44%
Swing	▲0.15pp	▼1.55pp	▲0.06pp
	Fourth party	Fifth party	Sixth party
Leader	Axel Lille	Kyösti Kallio	Antti Kaarne
Party	RKP	Agrarian	SKrTL
Last election	12.31%, 25 seats	6.73%, 13 seats	2.75%, 1 seat
Seats won	26	17	1
Seat change	▲1	▲4	Steady
Popular vote	107,121	60,157	17,344
Percentage	13.53%	7.60%	2.19%
Swing	▲1.22pp	▲0.87pp	▼0.69pp

Parliamentary elections were held in the Grand Duchy of Finland on 1 and 2 February 1910.

== Results ==
Party	Votes	%	Seats	+/–
Social Democratic Party	316,951	40.04	86	+2
Finnish Party	174,661	22.07	42	–6
Young Finnish Party	114,291	14.44	28	–1
Swedish People's Party	107,121	13.53	26	+1
Agrarian League	60,157	7.60	17	+4
Christian Workers' Union	17,344	2.19	1	0
Others	1,034	0.13	0	–
Total	791,559	100.00	200	0
Valid votes	791,559	99.37		
Invalid/blank votes	5,010	0.63		
Total votes	796,569	100.00		
Registered voters/turnout	1,324,931	60.12		
Source: Mackie & Rose
