= 1913 Finnish parliamentary election =

General election

| ← 1911 | 1–2 August 1913 | 1916 → |

All 200 seats in the Parliament of Finland 101 seats needed for a majority
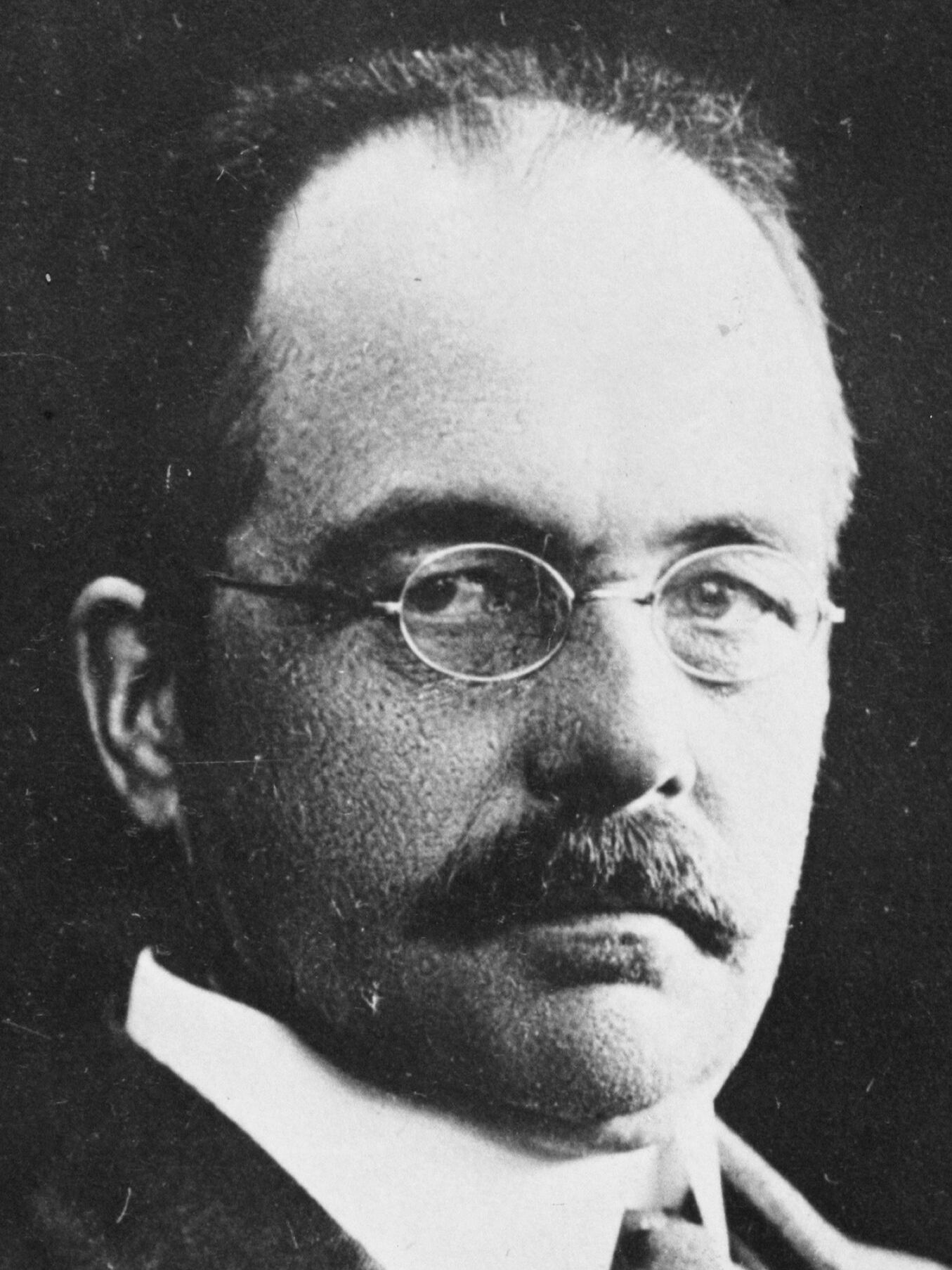

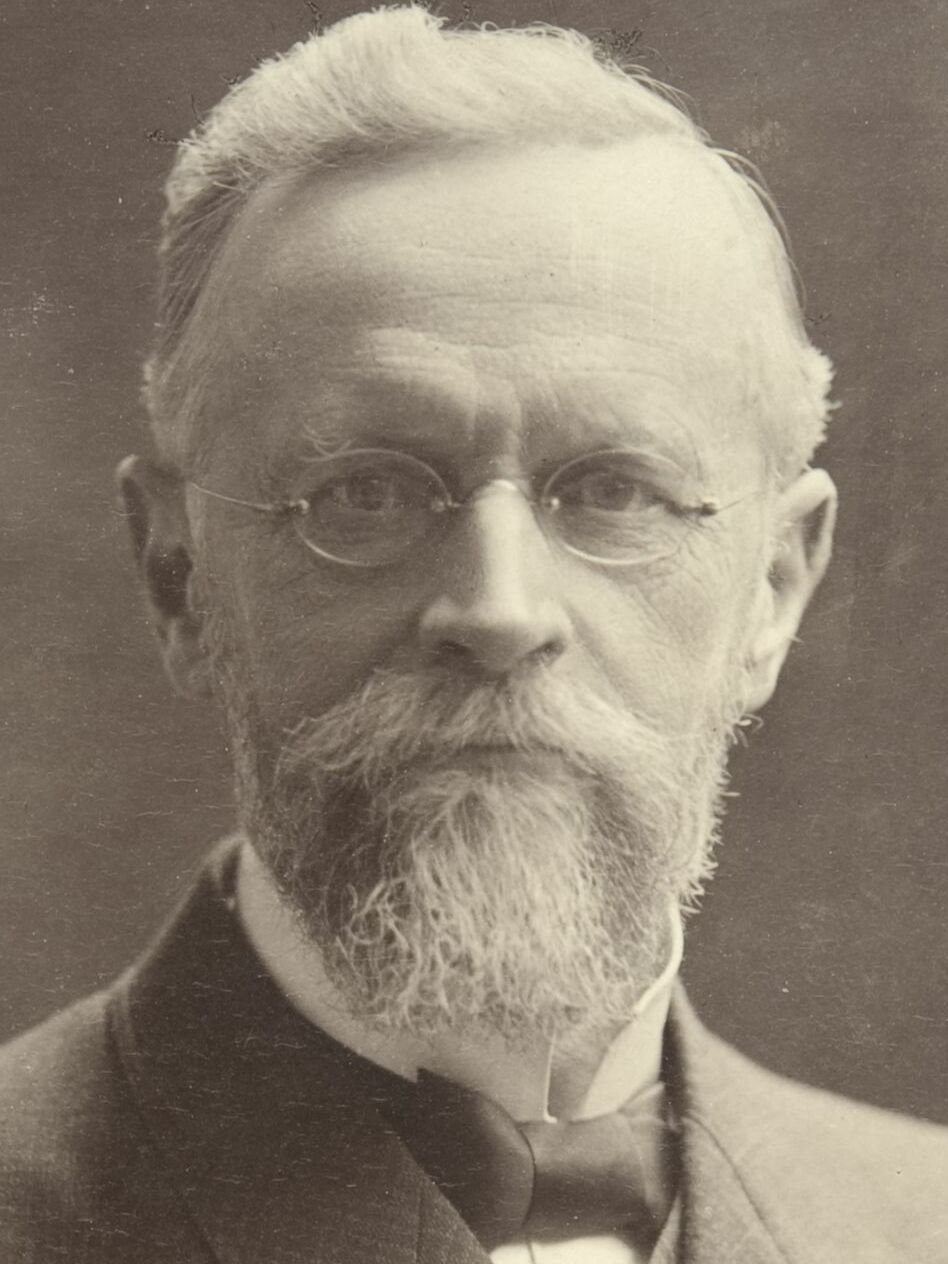

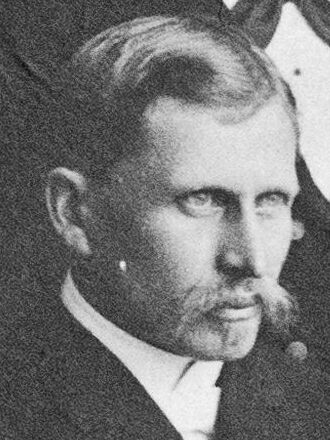
| | First party | Second party | Third party |
|---|---|---|---|
| Leader | Matti Paasivuori |
| Party | SDP | Finnish | Young Finnish |
| Last election | 40.03%, 86 seats | 21.71%, 43 seats | 14.88%, 28 seats |
| Seats won | 90 | 38 | 29 |
| Seat change | ▲4 | ▼5 | ▲1 |
| Popular vote | 312,214 | 143,982 | 102,313 |
| Percentage | 43.11% | 19.88% | 14.13% |
| Swing | ▲3.08pp | ▼1.83pp | ▼0.75pp |
| | Fourth party | Fifth party |
| Leader | Axel Lille | Kyösti Kallio |
| Party | RKP | Agrarian |
| Last election | 13.31%, 26 seats | 7.84%, 16 seats |
| Seats won | 25 | 18 |
| Seat change | ▼1 | ▲2 |
| Popular vote | 94,672 | 56,977 |
| Percentage | 13.07% | 7.87% |
| Swing | ▼0.24pp | ▲0.03pp |

Parliamentary elections were held in the Grand Duchy of Finland on 1 and 2 August 1913. In 1914, the Russian government decided to suspend the Finnish Parliament for the duration of World War I.

== Campaign ==
Finnish voters' growing frustration with Parliament's performance was reflected by the low voter turnout; the Social Democrats and Agrarians, championing the cause of poor workers and farmers, kept gaining votes at the expense of the Old Finns, whose main concern was the passive defence of Finland's self-government. They disagreed on the social and economic policies, and thus did not formulate very clear positions on them.

== Results ==
| Party | Votes | % | Seats | +/– |
|---|---|---|---|---|
| Social Democratic Party | 312,214 | 43.11 | 90 | +4 |
| Finnish Party | 143,982 | 19.88 | 38 | –5 |
| Young Finnish Party | 102,313 | 14.13 | 29 | +1 |
| Swedish People's Party | 94,672 | 13.07 | 25 | –1 |
| Agrarian League | 56,977 | 7.87 | 18 | +2 |
| Christian Workers' Union | 12,850 | 1.77 | 0 | –1 |
| Others | 1,296 | 0.18 | 0 | – |
| Total | 724,304 | 100.00 | 200 | 0 |
| Valid votes | 724,304 | 99.13 | | |
| Invalid/blank votes | 6,345 | 0.87 | | |
| Total votes | 730,649 | 100.00 | | |
| Registered voters/turnout | 1,430,135 | 51.09 | | |
Source: Mackie & Rose
