= Edvard Valpas-Hänninen =

Finnish politician and journalist (1873–1937)

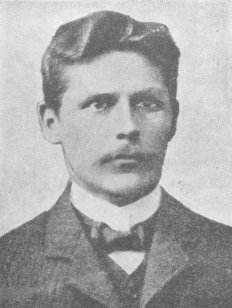
Edvard Valpas-Hänninen

Edvard Valpas-Hänninen (6 September 1873, Saarijärvi – 11 January 1937) was a Finnish journalist and politician. He was a Member of the Parliament of Finland from 1907 to 1918, representing the Social Democratic Party of Finland (SDP). During the Finnish Civil War of 1918, he sided with the Reds and fled to Soviet Russia after the defeat of the Red side. He returned to Finland in 1920 and was imprisoned from 1920 to 1924 for his role on the defeated side of the Civil War. Valpas-Hänninen received a presidential pardon in 1924.
