= 1916 Finnish parliamentary election =

General election

- 1 and 3 July 1916

All 200 seats in the Parliament of Finland 101 seats needed for a majority
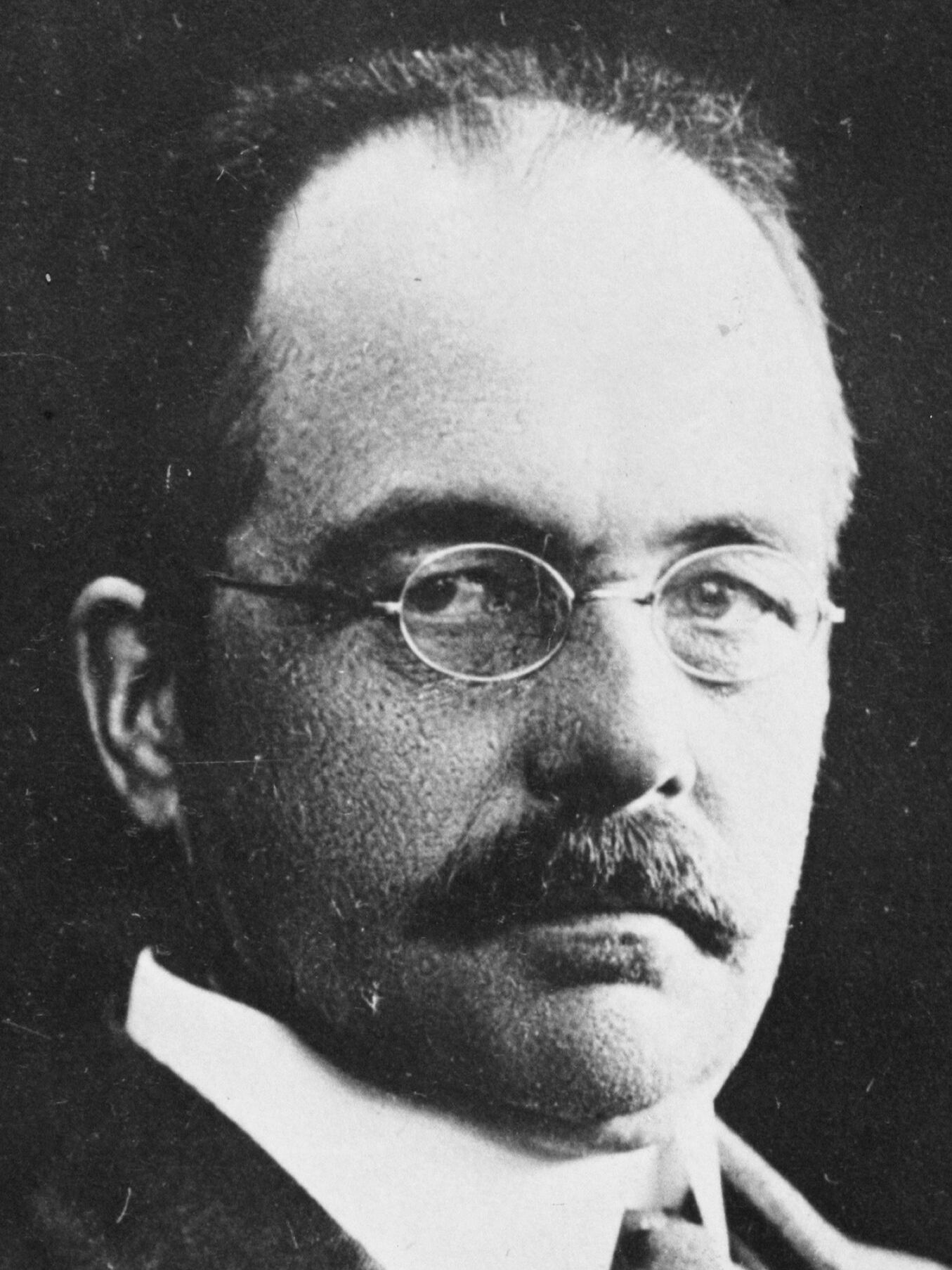

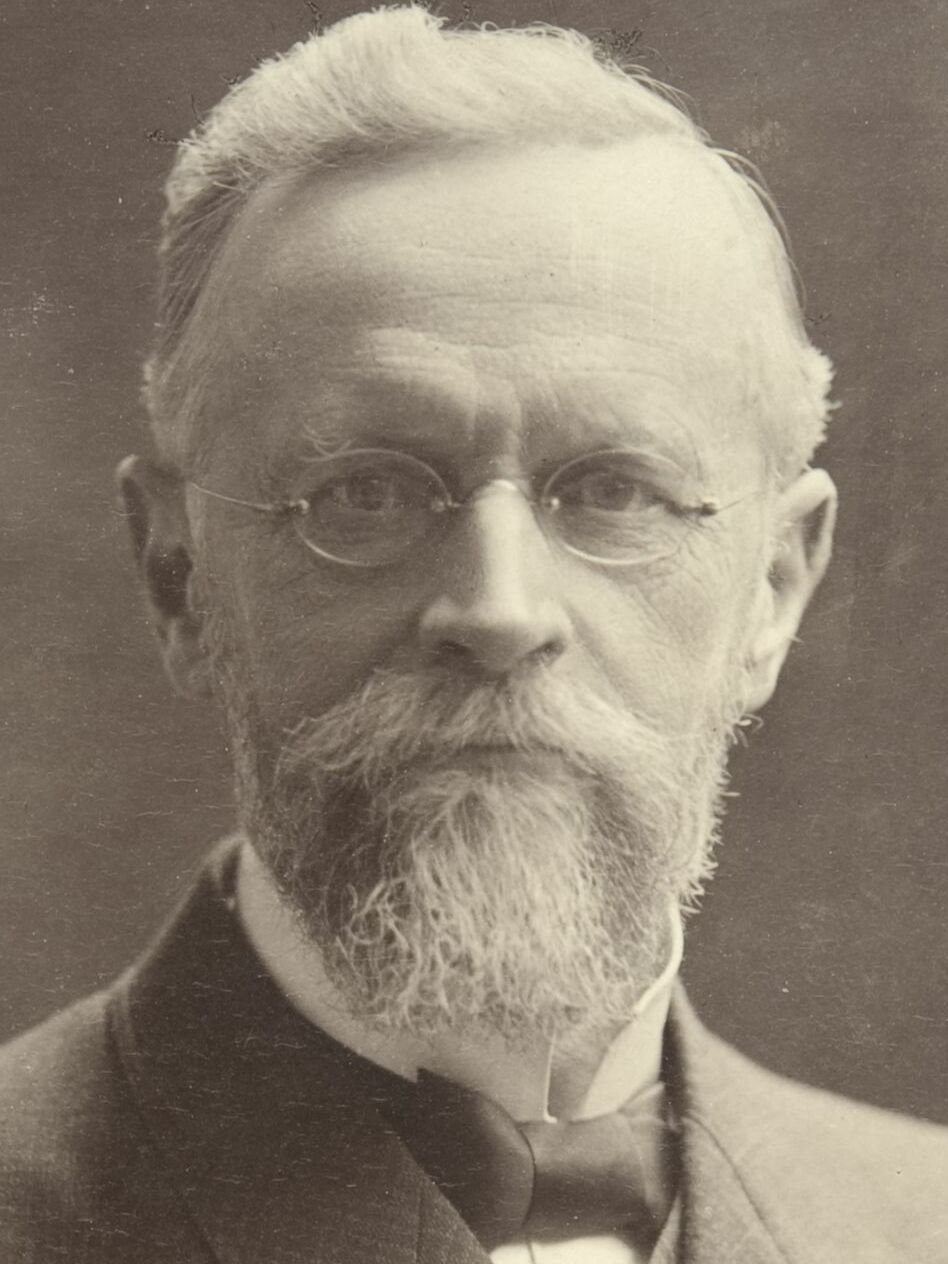

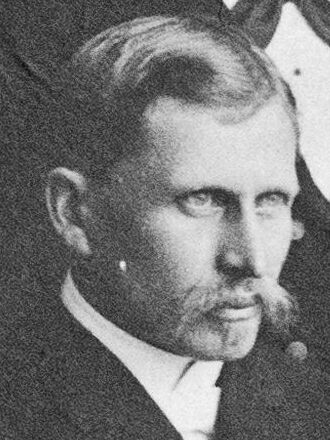

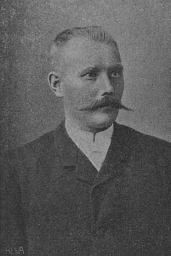
	First party	Second party	Third party
Leader	Matti Paasivuori
Party	SDP	Finnish	Young Finnish
Last election	43.11%, 90 seats	19.88%, 38 seats	14.13%, 29 seats
Seats won	103	33	23
Seat change	▲13	▼5	▼6
Popular vote	376,030	139,111	99,419
Percentage	47.29%	17.49%	12.50%
Swing	▲4.18pp	▼2.39pp	▼1.63pp
	Fourth party	Fifth party	Sixth party
Leader	Axel Lille	Kyösti Kallio	Antti Kaarne
Party	RKP	Agrarian	SKrTL
Last election	13.07%, 25 seats	7.87%, 18 seats	1.77%, 0 seats
Seats won	21	19	1
Seat change	▼4	▲1	▲1
Popular vote	93,555	71,608	14,626
Percentage	11.76%	9.00%	1.84%
Swing	▼1.31pp	▲1.13pp	▲0.07pp

Parliamentary elections were held in the Grand Duchy of Finland on 1 and 3 July 1916.

== Background ==
The Finnish Parliament had not been in session during the early years of World War I. The Russian army's severe losses to the German army started to awaken among the Finns the hope that they could regain self-government. The Russian government's plan to totally Russify Finland had been leaked to several Finnish newspapers in 1914, and had been heavily criticized. Its implementation had been suspended for the duration of the war.

== Campaign ==
The workers' and tenant farmers' discontent with their social and economic problems was growing; workers still had to work an average of ten hours per day, and the tenant farmers still rented their lands from the landowning peasants, and they could be expelled from those lands if they did not fulfill their contracts' quite strict conditions. The Social Democrats managed to win their first and so far only parliamentary majority in the Finnish elections by promising more effectively than the bourgeois parties to help the poor and underprivileged people among the Finns.

== Results ==
Party	Votes	%	Seats	+/–
Social Democratic Party	376,030	47.29	103	+13
Finnish Party	139,111	17.49	33	–5
Young Finnish Party	99,419	12.50	23	–6
Swedish People's Party	93,555	11.76	21	–4
Agrarian League	71,608	9.00	19	+1
Christian Workers' Union	14,626	1.84	1	+1
Others	860	0.11	0	–
Total	795,209	100.00	200	0
Valid votes	795,209	99.29		
Invalid/blank votes	5,725	0.71		
Total votes	800,934	100.00		
Registered voters/turnout	1,442,091	55.54		
Source: Mackie & Rose

== Aftermath ==
For the first time since parliamentary elections started in 1907, socialists gained a majority in the parliament, with the Social Democrats winning 103 of 200 seats. The elections also remain the only time in Finnish history in which a single party won a majority. The Tokoi Senate was formed under Socialist Oskari Tokoi, one of the first de facto socialist prime ministers in the world (though his title was Chairman of the Senate). The Social Democrats retained their majority until the dissolution of the parliament and subsequent elections in October 1917, when all the opposition parties (the Finnish Party, Young Finns, Swedish People's Party and Agrarians) formed an electoral alliance, the "Bourgeoisie block".

In March 1917 the February Revolution essentially forced Tsar Nicholas II, who had the highest authority in the Grand Duchy of Finland, and who could dissolve the Finnish parliament, to refuse any new laws and appoint a governor-general when he abdicated. This began an administrative crisis, both for the socialists and the bourgeoisie block, on how to proceed. The Provisional Republican Russian government was still in power and administration continued relatively normally, but domestic issues including rising inflation, food shortages and political radicalism was a daily issue in both cities and the countryside.

During the July Days, when then-capital of the Russian provisional Republic, Petrograd, was experiencing anarchic chaos from both military units, anarchists and Bolsheviks, the Finnish parliament came to an agreement to pass and enforce the "Autonomy Law"/"Legality Act" (Valtalaki), which declared that the Finnish Parliament and its Senate was the highest political authority in Finland. The law was passed on 18 July 1917, but was never fully enforced. Just the passage of the Valtalaki act complicated the legal administrative situation, as the (Swedish) Instrument of Government of 1772, which was the ruling law for political administration of the Grand Duchy of Finland, declared the Tsar to be the highest political authority in Finland, but now Nicholas II had abdicated and there was chaos in Petrograd. However, Petrograd's legal government regained control in late July and moderate Alexander Kerensky was appointed prime minister, while the Russian government under Kerensky refused to sign the Valtalaki into law as it would have essentially ceded all political and administrative powers of Finland except foreign and military policy to the Finnish parliament. Kerensky and the Petrograd government, still the highest political authority, decided to release a manifesto to break the Finnish Parliament. The manifesto declared, that the Russian provisional government was, legally speaking, the highest authority for the Grand Duchy of Finland, unless the Russian parliament or a Russian-based constitutional convention decided otherwise. This was a win for the "Bourgeoisie block", because the Valtalaki would have transferred power to a Finnish parliament under socialist control. In the October snap elections, bourgeois parties united against a common enemy, the Social Democrats, and managed to remove the Social Democrats' parliamentary majority. This was significant, as the politically divided Finland would go on to declare herself independent in December 1917, with the bourgeois controlled Parliament in political control of the nation heading into what would become the Finnish Civil War.
