= Matti Paasivuori =

Finnish politician

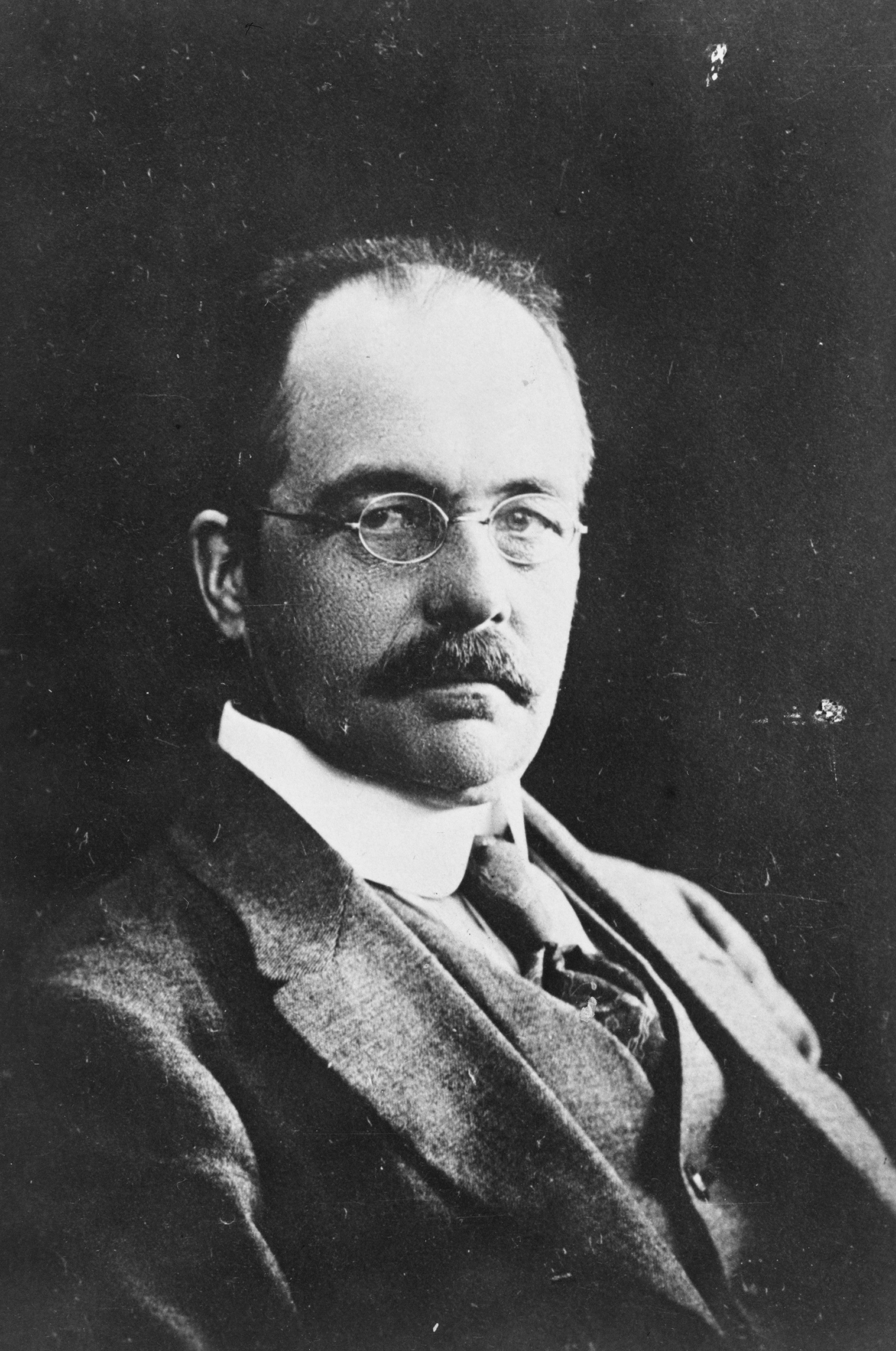

Finnish Minister of Social Affairs (Sosiaaliministeri)
- In office 15 November, 1927 – 17 December, 1927

Minister without portfolio
- In office 13 December, 1926 – 15 November, 1927

Personal details
- Born: 6 May 1866 Ilmajoki, Grand Duchy of Finland, Russian Empire
- Died: 16 June 1937 (aged 71) Helsinki, Finland
- Resting place: Hietaniemi Cemetery; Helsinki, Finland
- Other political affiliations: Social Democratic Party of Finland

Matti Paasivuori (6 May 1866, Ilmajoki - 16 June 1937 in Helsinki) was a Finnish politician from the Social Democratic Party. Paasivuori was the Chairman of the Social Democratic Party on three occasions: 1909–1911, 1913–1917 and 1926–1930.

== Early life and career ==
Paasivuori worked as a carpenter and participated early in the labor movement. He was a pioneer in the labor movement as a leader of the Finnish Trade Union Federation and affected its ideological and political development. Since 1907 he was Member of the Finnish Parliament (Eduskunta) and participated in the development of occupational safety legislation. He was moderate in his political orientation and gained respect in both ends of the political spectrum. In 1917 he was Deputy Head of Trade and Industry in Oskari Tokoi's Senate, which was the first government in the world led by a Social Democrat. Paasivuori did not take part in the Finnish Civil War of 1918 and after the defeat of the red troops he was for a half year the only representative from the political left who was allowed to participate in the parliament. Paasivuori was the minister of social affairs in the minority government of Väinö Tanner from 1926 to 1927.

Paasivuori is buried in the Hietaniemi Cemetery in Helsinki. Paasivuorenkatu Street in central Helsinki (in Hakaniemi) is named after him.
