= 1917 Finnish parliamentary election =

General election

← 1916	1–2 October 1917	1919 →

All 200 seats in the Parliament of Finland 101 seats needed for a majority
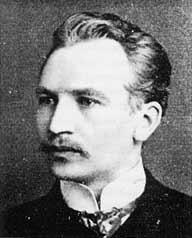

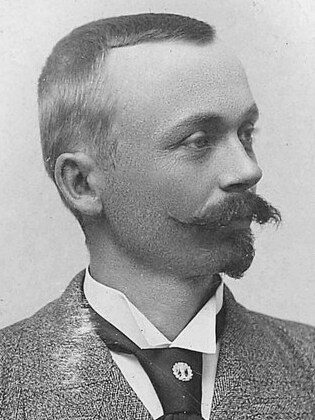

	First party	Second party
Leader	Kullervo Manner
Party	SDP	Finnish–Young Finnish–People's
Last election	47.29%, 103 seats	29.99%, 56 seats
Seats won	92	61
Seat change	▼11	▲5
Popular vote	444,670	299,516
Percentage	44.79%	30.17%
Swing	▼2.50pp	▲0.18pp
	Third party	Fourth party
Leader	Filip Saalasti	Eric von Rettig
Party	Agrarian	RKP
Last election	9.00%, 19 seats	11.76%, 21 seats
Seats won	26	21
Seat change	▲7	Steady
Popular vote	122,900	108,190
Percentage	12.38%	10.90%
Swing	▲3.38pp	▼0.86pp

Parliamentary elections were held in the Grand Duchy of Finland on 1 and 2 October 1917. The general voter turnout was higher than in previous elections. The Social Democrats lost the absolute majority that they had had in the previous two elections (although they, like the other parties, had increased their number of votes in absolute terms). In other words, the "bourgeois" (non-socialist) parties taken together now had more than half the seats.

== Background ==
The elections were the result of the constitutional crisis in Finland caused by the Russian revolution. As Russian Tsar Nicholas, head of state in Finland, had abdicated without a successor, the Finnish Parliament stated that it would become the highest power in internal matters. The Russian Provisional Government did not accept this, but ordered premature parliamentary elections, which was thought illegal by the Socialists.

== Campaign ==
The Social Democrats demanded the quick implementation of eight-hour work day and the quick freeing of tenant farmers. The bourgeois parties, on average, wanted first to ensure that Finland would become fully independent, and only then to implement such social and economic reforms.

== Results ==
Party	Votes	%	Seats	+/–
Social Democratic Party	444,670	44.79	92	–11
Finnish Party–Young Finnish Party–People's Party	299,516	30.17	61	+5
Agrarian League	122,900	12.38	26	+7
Swedish People's Party	108,190	10.90	21	0
Christian Workers' Union	15,489	1.56	0	–1
Others	1,997	0.20	0	–
Total	992,762	100.00	200	0
Valid votes	992,762	99.51		
Invalid/blank votes	4,903	0.49		
Total votes	997,665	100.00		
Registered voters/turnout	1,441,075	69.23		
Source: Mackie & Rose
