= Antti Kaarne =

Finnish politician

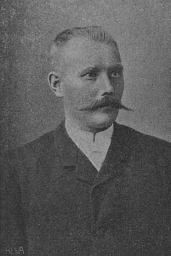
Antti Kaarne

Antti Johannes Kaarne (27 November 1875, Messukylä - 14 July 1924, Turku; surname until 1906 Karlsson) was a Finnish industrial worker, smallholder, newspaper editor and politician. He was a member of the Parliament of Finland, representing from 1908 to 1911 the Christian Workers' Union of Finland (SKrTL) and from 1922 to 1923 the Socialist Workers' Party of Finland (SSTP). In 1923 he was imprisoned on sedition charges.
