= Parliament of Finland =

Supreme unicameral legislature of Finland

Parliament of Finland Suomen eduskunta Finlands riksdag
- 39th Parliament of Finland

Type
- Type: Unicameral

History
- Founded: 9 May 1906; 120 years ago
- Preceded by: Diet of Finland

Leadership
- Speaker: Jussi Halla-aho, Finns since 21 June 2023
- First deputy speaker: Paula Risikko, National Coalition since 21 June 2023
- Second deputy speaker: Tarja Filatov, Social Democratic since 12 April 2023
- Prime Minister: Petteri Orpo, National Coalition since 20 June 2023
- Deputy Prime Minister: Riikka Purra, Finns since 20 June 2023

Structure
- Seats: 200
- Political groups: Government (Orpo Cabinet) (108): National Coalition (48); Finns (45); Swedish People's (10) (Note: Åland Coalition (1)); Christian Democrats (5); Opposition (92): Social Democratic (43); Centre (23); Green League (13); Left Alliance (11); Movement Now (1); Independent (1)
- Committees: 17: Grand; Constitutional Law; Foreign Affairs; Finance; Audit; Employment and Equality; Administration; Legal Affairs; Transport and Communications; Agriculture and Forestry; Defence; Education and Culture; Social Affairs and Health; Commerce; Intelligence; Future; Environment
- Length of term: 4 years
- Salary: €7,137 monthly (Note: €7,494 for MPs who've worked more than four years, and €7,993 for MPs who've worked for more than 12 years.)

Elections
- Voting system: Open list proportional representation
- Last election: 2 April 2023
- Next election: 18 April 2027

Meeting place
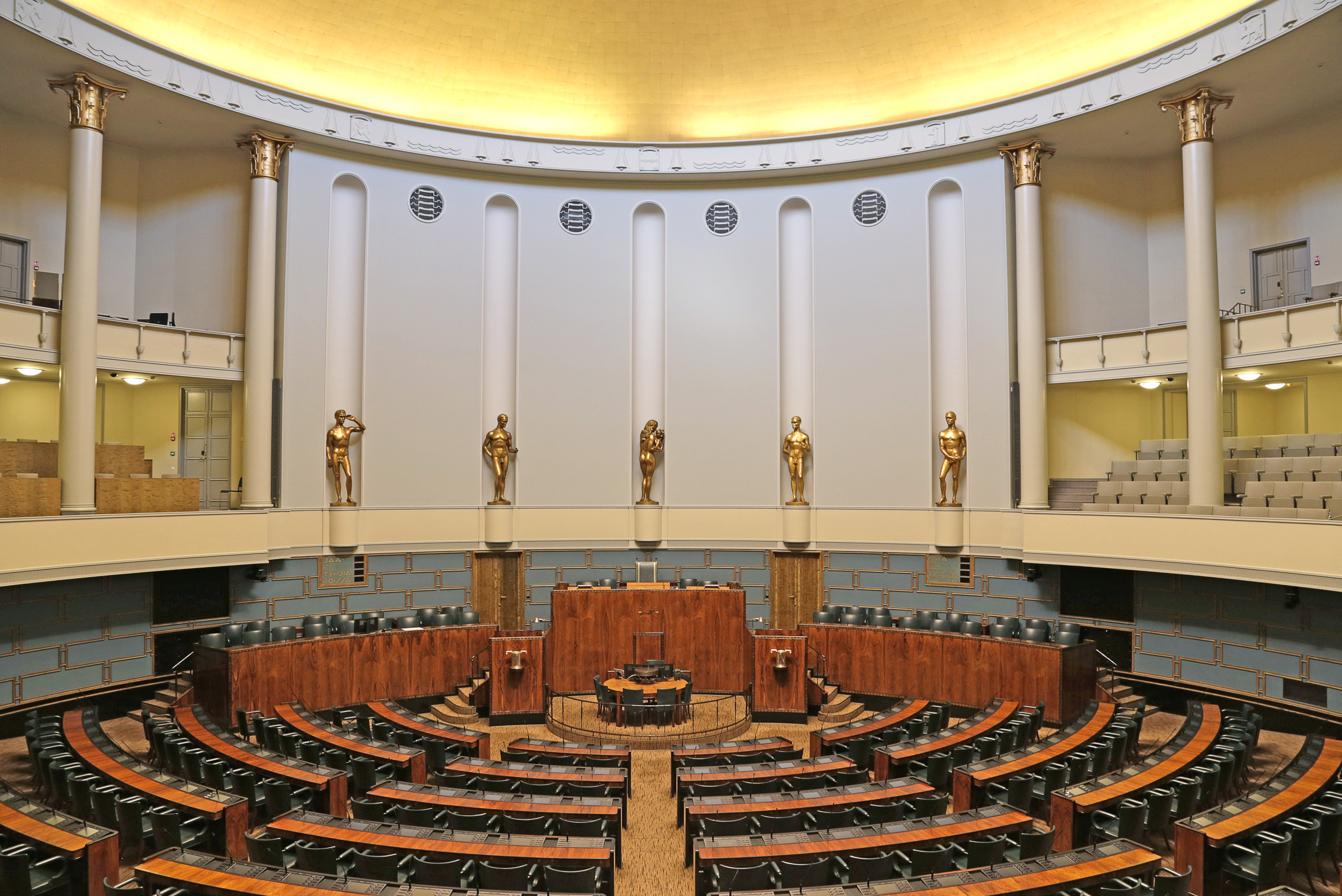
- Parliament House, Helsinki

Website
- www.eduskunta.fi/EN/Pages/default.aspx

Constitution
- Constitution of Finland

The Parliament of Finland (Finnish: Suomen eduskunta [ˈsuo̯men ˈeduskuntɑ]; Swedish: Finlands riksdag [ˈfinlɑnds ˈriksdɑː(ɡ)]) is the unicameral and supreme legislature of Finland, founded on 9 May 1906. In accordance with the Constitution of Finland, sovereignty belongs to the people, and that power is vested in the Parliament. The Parliament consists of 200 members, 199 of whom are elected every four years from 13 multi-member districts electing 6 to 37 members using the proportional D'Hondt method. In addition, there is one member from Åland.

Legislation may be initiated by either the Government or one of the members of Parliament. The Parliament passes legislation, decides on the state budget, approves international treaties, and supervises the activities of the government. It may bring about the resignation of the Finnish Government, override presidential vetoes, and alter the constitution. To make changes to the constitution, amendments must be approved by two successive parliaments, with an election cycle in between. The first parliament requires a 1/2 majority to approve it and the second a 2/3 majority. If the matter is urgent and can not wait for an election, the amendment can be declared urgent by a 5/6 majority. An urgent amendment can then be passed by a 2/3 majority. Most MPs work in parliamentary groups which correspond with the political parties. The Parliament currently comprises nine parliamentary groups. Since the establishment of the Parliament in 1905, the parliamentary majority has been held once by a single party: the Social Democrats in the 1916 election. Thus, for the government to gain a majority in the Parliament, coalition governments are favored. These are generally formed by at least two of the three historically major parties: the Social Democrats, Centre, and National Coalition. Ministers are often but not necessarily MPs. The Parliament meets in the Parliament House (Finnish: Eduskuntatalo, Swedish: Riksdagshuset), which is located in central Helsinki.

The most recent parliamentary election took place on 2 April 2023. After the 2023 election the Orpo Cabinet was formed by the National Coalition, Finns and Swedish People's parties as well as the Christian Democrats.

== Name ==
=== Finnish ===
The Parliament's Finnish name is eduskunta, uncapitalized. First attested in 1853 in Daniel Europaeus' Finnish-Swedish dictionary with the meaning 'Assembly of Representatives', it was used to refer to e.g. the United States House of Representatives. The term was introduced into the Finnish law when the unicameral parliament was established in 1906. Until the 1950s, eduskunta could be used as a general term for legislatures in any country, but nowadays it is only used for the Finnish parliament.

=== Swedish ===
In Swedish, the Parliament's name is riksdag, uncapitalized. This is also the general term for the Swedish legislature. Riksdag derives from the genitive of rike ('realm') referring to the independent state of Finland, and dag, meaning diet or conference.

Before independence, until the Constitution Act of 1919, the Parliament was known, in Swedish, as lantdagen (cognate of landtag, having the sense of "subnational assembly") which was the old term for the Diet of Finland.

== History ==
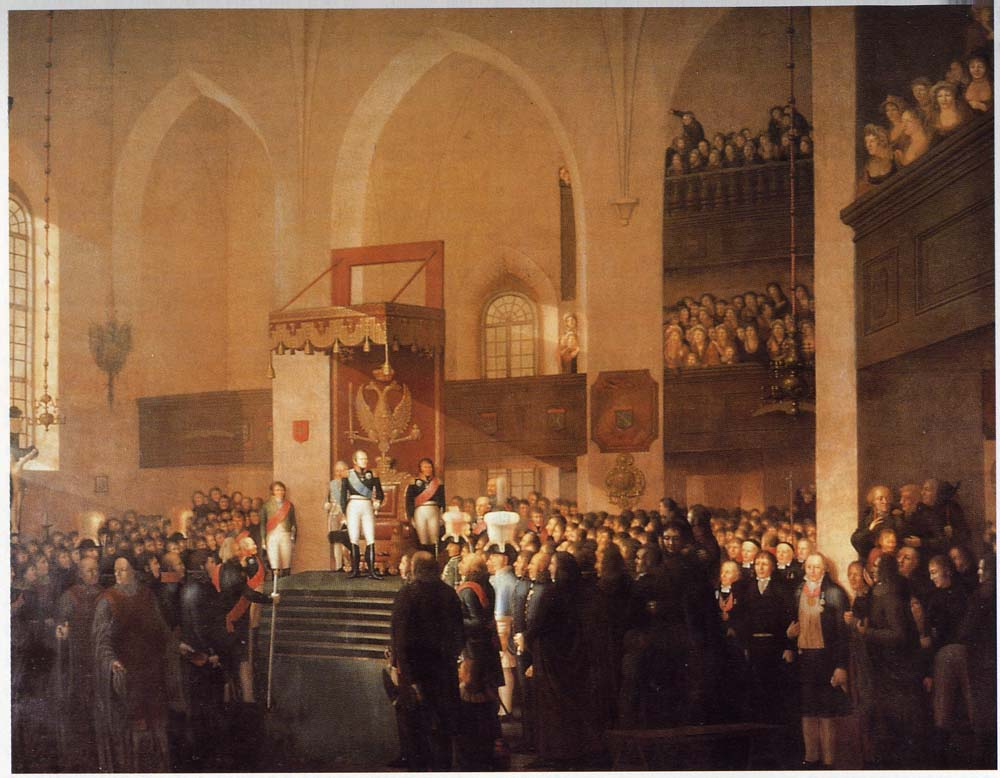
The Diet of Porvoo is opened by Tsar Alexander I in 1809.

The Parliament of Finland was preceded by the Diet of Finland (Swedish: lantdagen; Finnish: maapäivät, modern Finnish: valtiopäivät), which had succeeded the Riksdag of the Estates in 1809. When the unicameral Parliament of Finland was established by the Parliament Act in 1906, Finland was an autonomous grand duchy and principality under the Imperial Russian Tsar, who ruled as the Grand Duke, rather than as an absolute monarch. Universal suffrage and eligibility was implemented, making Finland the second country in the world to adopt universal suffrage. Women could both vote and run for office as equals, and this applied also to landless people, with no excluded minorities. The first election to the Parliament was arranged in 1907. The first Parliament had 19 female representatives, an unprecedented number at the time, which grew to 21 by 1913.

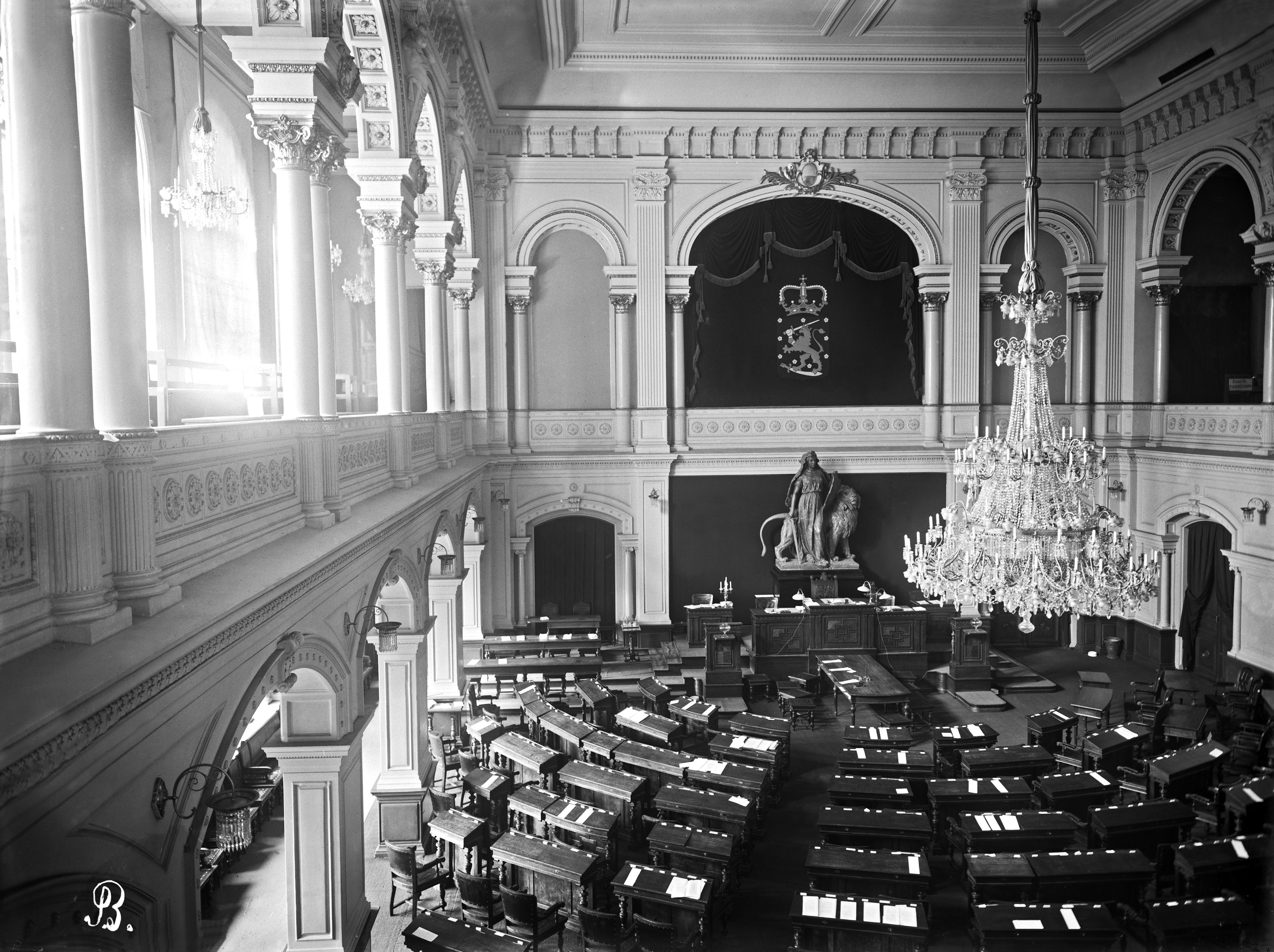
Parliament session hall in 1907

The first years of the new Parliament were difficult. Between 1908 and 1916 the power of the Finnish Parliament was almost completely neutralized by the Russian Tsar Nicholas II and the so-called "sabre senate" of Finland, a bureaucratic government formed by Imperial Russian Army officers during the second period of "Russification". The Parliament was dissolved and new elections were held almost every year.

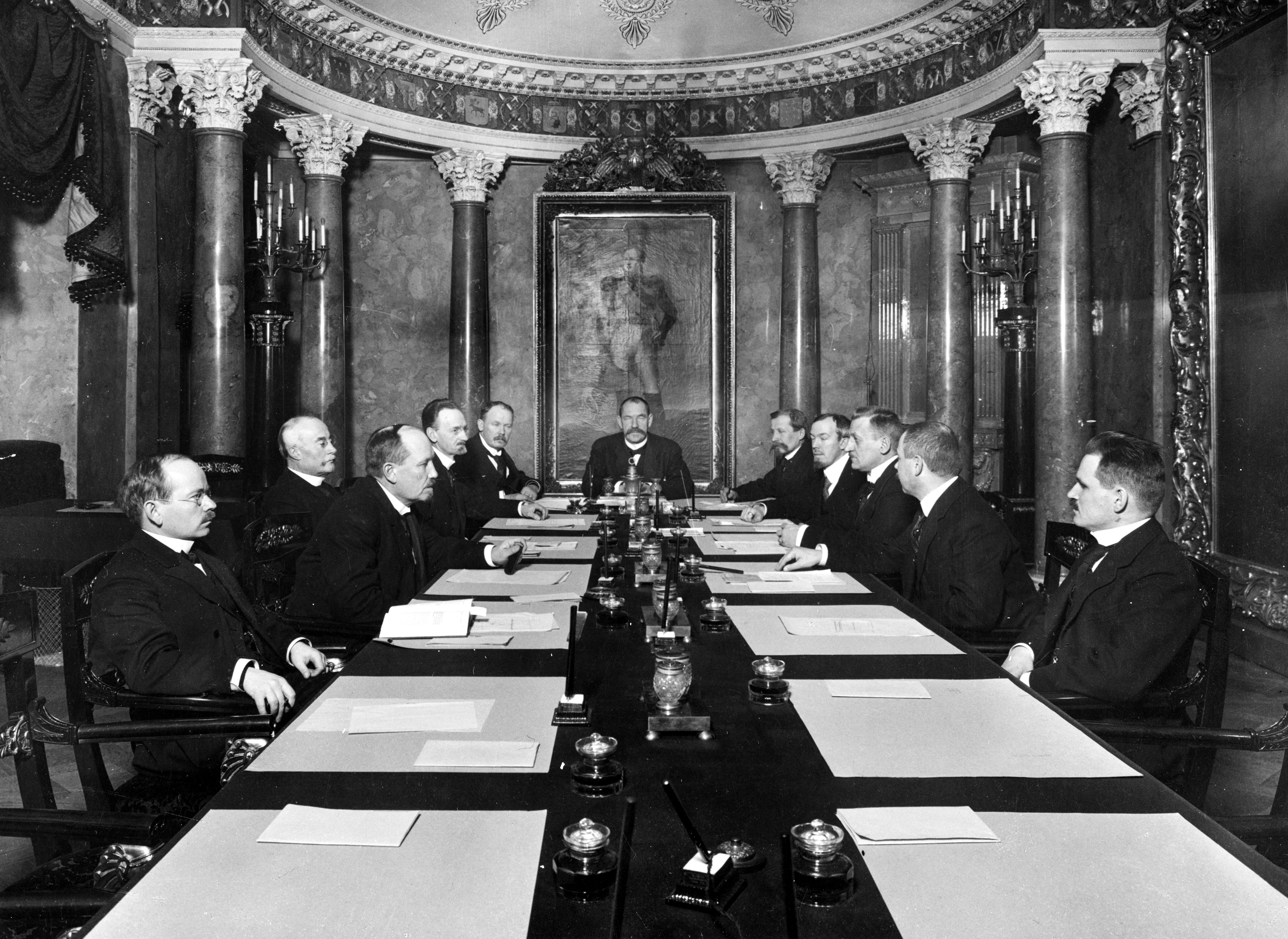
The Finnish Senate of 1917, Prime Minister P. E. Svinhufvud in the head of table

The Finnish Parliament received true political power for the first time after the February Revolution (First Revolution) of 1917 in Russia. Finland declared its full independence on 6 December 1917, and in the winter and spring of 1918 endured a civil war in which the forces of the Senate, known as the White Guard, defeated the socialist Red Guard.

After the war, monarchists and republicans struggled over the country's form of government. The monarchists seemed to gain a victory when the Parliament elected a German prince as King of Finland in the fall of 1918. This decision was made on the basis of the other Nordic countries also having monarchs. However, the king-elect abdicated the throne after Imperial Germany was defeated in World War I, on 11 November 1918. In the parliamentary election of 1919, the republican parties won three-quarters of the seats, extinguishing the monarchists' ambitions. Finland became a republic with a parliamentary system, but in order to appease the monarchist parties, which favoured a strong head of state, extensive powers were granted to the president of Finland.

When the Soviet Union attacked Finland in the Winter War, in early December 1939 Parliament was evacuated and the legislature temporarily relocated to Kauhajoki, a town in western Finland far away from the frontline. The parliament held 34 plenary sessions in Kauhajoki, with the last on 12 February 1940. Another temporary relocation was seen during the renovation of the Parliament House in 2015–2017 when the Parliament convened in the neighbouring Sibelius Academy.

The Constitution of 1919, which instituted a parliamentary system, did not undergo any major changes for 70 years. Although the government was responsible to the Parliament, the president wielded considerable authority, which was used to its full extent by long-standing President Urho Kekkonen. As the Constitution implemented very strong protections for political minorities, most changes in legislation and state finances could be blocked by a qualified minority of one third. This, in conjunction with the inability of some of the parties to enter into coalition governments, led to weak, short-lived cabinets.

During President Mauno Koivisto's tenure in the 1980s, cabinets sitting for the whole parliamentary term became the norm. At the same time, the ability of qualified minorities to block legislation was gradually removed and the powers of the Parliament were greatly increased in the constitutional reform of 1991.

The revised 2000 draft of the Finnish constitution removed almost all domestic powers of the president, strengthening the position of the cabinet and the Parliament. It also included the methods for the discussion of EU legislation under preparation in the Parliament.

=== Dissolutions of Parliament ===
The Parliament of Finland has been dissolved before the end of its term fourteen times during its existence. The most recent instance was on 4 June 1975.

Date	Dissolver	Reason	New elections
6 April 1908	Emperor Nicholas II	No confidence vote	Parliamentary election, 1908
22 February 1909	Emperor Nicholas II	Dispute over the Speaker P. E. Svinhufvud's opening speech	Parliamentary election, 1909
18 November 1909	Emperor Nicholas II	Dispute over military budget contribution to the Imperial Russian Army	Parliamentary election, 1910
8 October 1910	Emperor Nicholas II	Dispute over military budget contribution to the Imperial Russian Army and Non-Discrimination Act	Parliamentary election, 1911
1913	Emperor Nicholas II		Parliamentary election, 1913
2 August 1917	Provisional Government of Russia	Act of Power	Parliamentary election, 1917
23 December 1918	Carl Gustaf Emil Mannerheim (State Regent)	Hung parliament	Parliamentary election, 1919
18 January 1924	K. J. Ståhlberg (President)	Hung parliament	Parliamentary election, 1924,
19 April 1929	Lauri Kristian Relander	Government clerks payroll act voting	Parliamentary election, 1929
15 July 1930	Lauri Kristian Relander	Bill over banning communist activity	Parliamentary election, 1930
8 December 1953	J. K. Paasikivi	Government cabinet crises	Parliamentary election, 1954
14 November 1961	Urho Kekkonen	Note Crisis	Parliamentary election, 1962
29 October 1971	Urho Kekkonen	Dispute over agricultural payroll	Parliamentary election, 1972
4 June 1975	Urho Kekkonen	Dispute over developing area budget	Parliamentary election, 1975

== Elections ==
The Parliament's 200 representatives are elected directly by ballot on the basis of proportional representation. A standard electoral period is four years. Elections have previously taken two days, but as early voting has become more popular, they are now conducted during one day; the third Sunday of April of an election year.

Every Finnish citizen who is at least 18 years of age on the election date is entitled to vote in general elections. There is normally no need to register as a voter, and citizens receive an invitation by mail. With certain exceptions, such as military personnel on active duty, high judicial officials, the President of the Republic, and persons under guardianship, any voter may also stand as a candidate for the Parliament. All registered parties are entitled to nominate candidates; individual citizens and independent electoral organizations must be endorsed by a sufficient number of voters through the form of supporter cards to apply.

In parliamentary elections, Finland is divided into 13 electoral districts. The number of representatives granted to each district is proportional to its population, except for Åland, which always elects one representative. The provincial state offices appoint an election board in each electoral district to prepare lists of candidates and to approve the election results. The Ministry of Justice has the ultimate responsibility for holding elections.

The president of Finland can call for an early election. As per the version of the constitution currently in use, the president can do this only upon proposal by the prime minister and after consultations with the parliamentary groups while the Parliament is in session. In prior versions of the constitution, the president had the power to do this unilaterally.

There is no hard and fast election threshold to get a seat in Parliament. This results in a large number of parties being represented. In 2019, for instance, nine parties won seats, with six winning at least 15 seats. With so many parties and the lack of a threshold, it is nearly impossible for one party to win an outright majority. During the history of the Parliament, only one party has ever won an outright majority–when the Social Democrats won 103 seats in the election of 1916. Since independence in 1917, no party has ever won the 101 seats needed for a majority. Instead, most Finnish governments have been coalitions formed by three or more parties. Many of them have been grand coalitions between parties with varying ideological backgrounds, as usually neither of the two largest opposing forces - the socialist bloc and the conservative bloc - win enough seats to govern on their own.

The seats for each electoral district are assigned according to the D'Hondt method. Electoral districts were originally based on the historical lääni division of 1634, but there have been several subsequent changes. Although there is no set election threshold, many electoral districts have become smaller in terms of population in recent decades, and some now elect as few as six representatives. This makes it harder for small parties to win MPs in these districts.

== Parliamentary groups ==
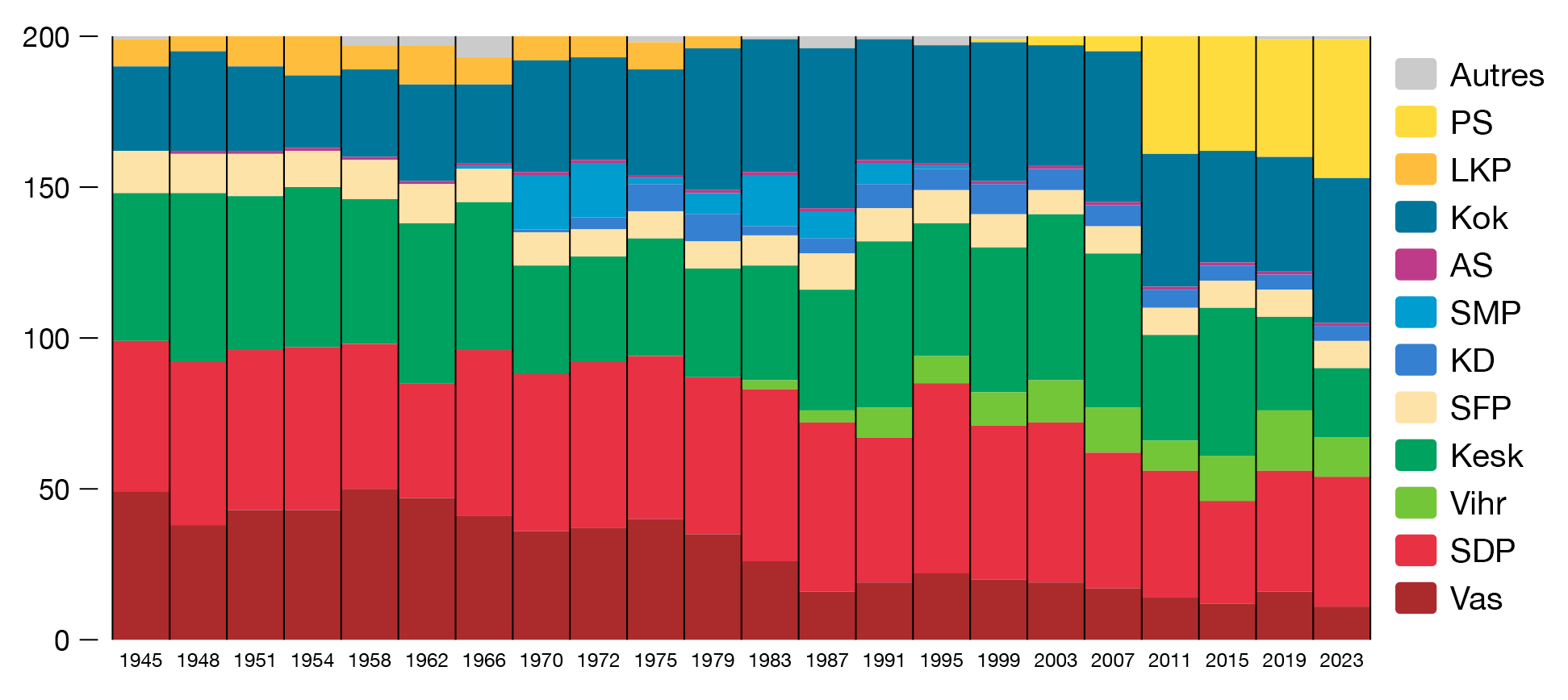
Evolution of parliamentary groups from 1945 to 2023

MPs work in parliamentary groups (eduskuntaryhmä). The parliamentary groups generally correspond to political parties, although occasionally dissidents can be removed from the party group and form their own. As of September 2019 there are nine groups, one of which is a one-man group. A group generally tries to reach a unanimous decision on a common position, but failing to do so may take a vote. This position then defines voting in the parliamentary session proper according to party discipline. Exceptions to this principle are made on matters on which no party line or government policy exists. Parliamentary groups make their decisions independently of their party leadership, and group leaders of major parties accordingly rank alongside government ministers and party leaders as influential political leaders.

Each parliamentary group receives funding for its operations and may have staff of its own.

== Formation of government ==
The president of Finland consults the speaker of Parliament and representatives of parliamentary groups about the formation of a new Finnish Government. According to the Constitution of Finland, the Parliament elects the prime minister, who is appointed to office by the president. The prime minister is, in practice, the most powerful politician in the country. Other ministers are appointed by the president on the prime minister's proposal. While individual ministers are not appointed by the Parliament, they may be individually removed by a motion of no confidence. The government, as a whole, must also have the confidence of the Parliament and must resign on a motion of no confidence. The government has collective ministerial responsibility.

Before the prime minister is elected, the parliamentary groups (which correspond to their respective political parties) negotiate on the government platform and on the composition of the government. On the basis of the outcome of these negotiations, and after having consulted the speaker of the house and the parliamentary groups, the president informs the Parliament of the nominee for prime minister. The parliament votes on the proposal, and if successful, the nominee is elected prime minister. Although Finland essentially always has multi-party coalition governments, the process is made smoother by party discipline: coalition MPs vote together to ensure a majority.

== Sessions ==
The annual session of parliament generally begins in February and consists of two terms, the first from January to June, the second from September to December. At the start of an annual session, the nation's political leaders and their guests attend a special worship service at Helsinki Cathedral before the ceremonies continue at the Parliament House, where the president formally opens the session.

On the first day of each annual session, the Parliament selects a speaker and two deputy speakers from its members. This election is chaired by the oldest MP in office. The three members who are elected to serve as speaker and first deputy speaker and second deputy speaker respectively take the following solemn oath before the Parliament;

"I, [name of the MP], affirm that in my office as Speaker I will to the best of my ability defend the rights of the people, Parliament and the government of Finland according to the Constitution."

During each annual session of Parliament, Finland's delegations to the Nordic Council and the Council of Europe are assigned. The Parliament also elects five of its members to the bench of the High Court of Impeachment for the duration of the parliamentary term.

== Committees ==
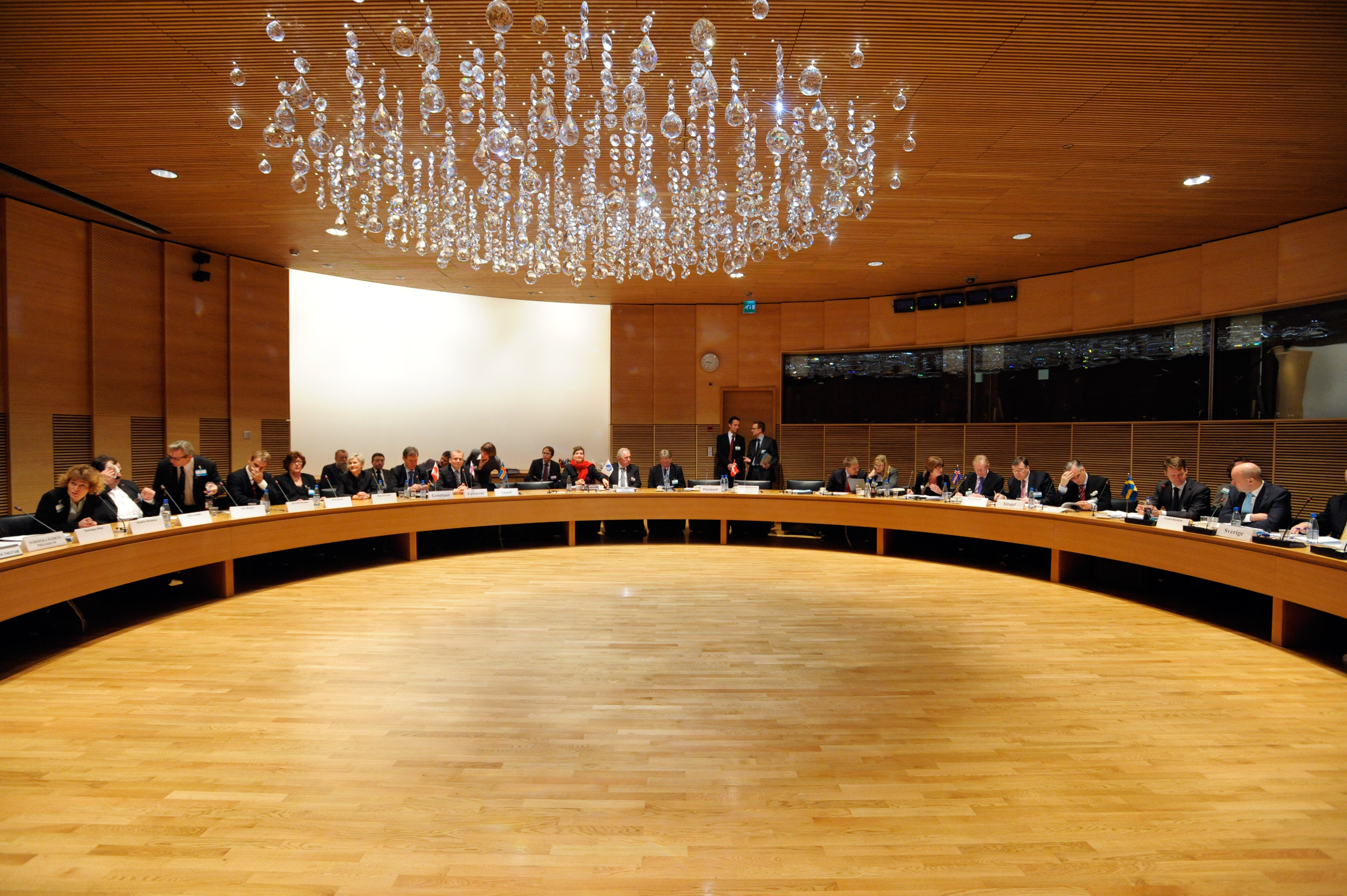
The Grand Committee Room

The Parliament has 17 committees. Most committees have 17 permanent members, except for the Grand Committee, which has 25; the Finance Committee, which has 21; and the Audit and Intelligence Oversight Committees, which have 11 each. In addition to these permanent members, each of the committees has a number of substitute members. On average, each member of the Parliament is also a member of two committees.

Most of the committees are special committees, while the Grand Committee deals with EU affairs, but also has a wider range of tasks. As Finland does not have a constitutional court, the role of the Constitutional Law Committee is to oversee constitutional affairs. The Committee for the Future is also noteworthy, as it does not usually deal with bills, but instead assesses factors relating to future developments and gives statements to other committees on issues relating to the future outlooks of their respective fields of speciality. The newest committee is the Intelligence Oversight Committee which was created in 2019.

Committee
Grand Committee
Constitutional Law Committee
Foreign Affairs Committee
Finance Committee
Audit Committee
Administration Committee
Legal Affairs Committee
Transport and Communications Committee
Agriculture and Forestry Committee
Defence Committee
Education and Culture Committee
Social Affairs and Health Committee
Commerce Committee
Committee for the Future
Employment and Equality Committee
Environment Committee
Intelligence Oversight Committee

== Proceedings ==
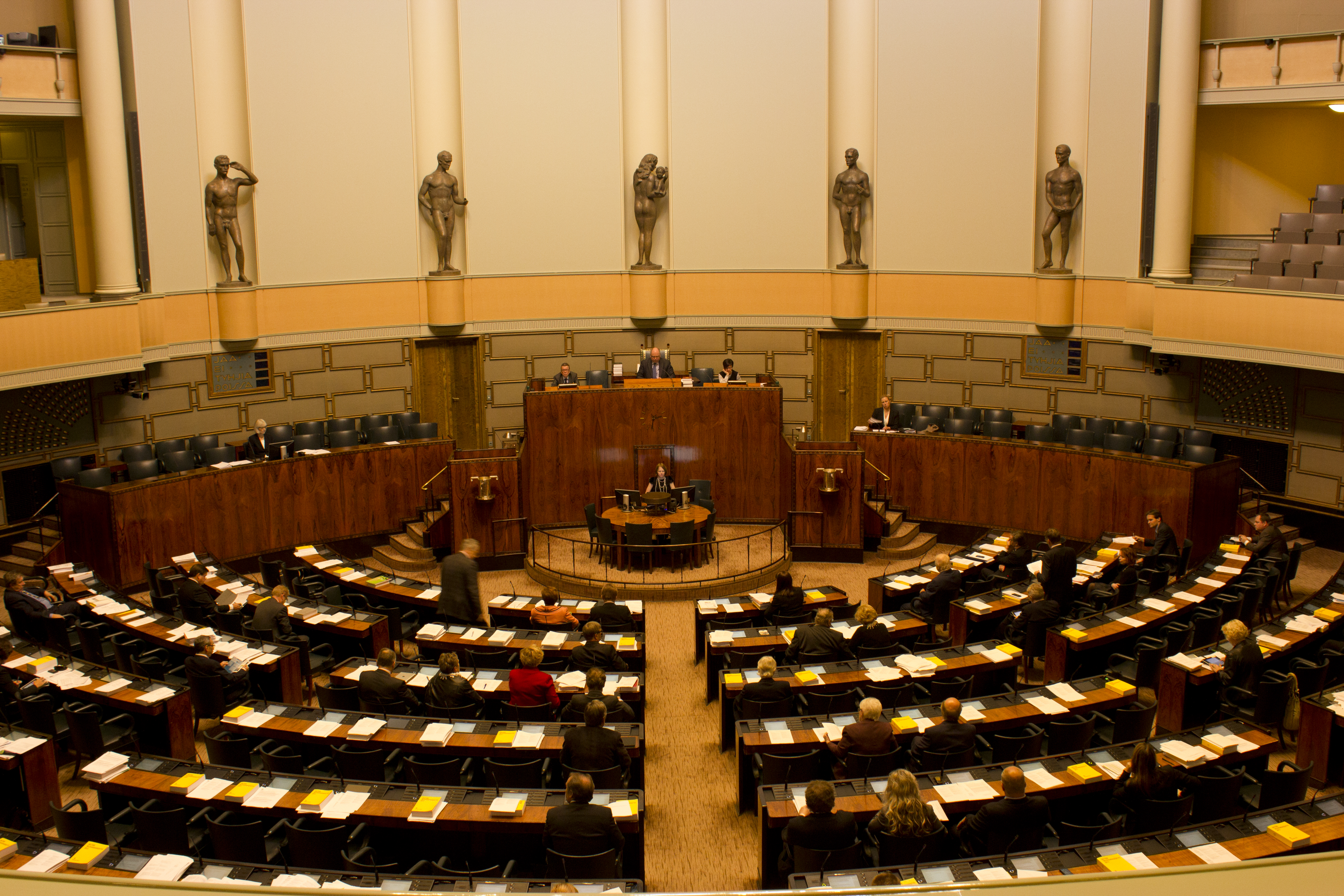
The Session Hall of the Parliament

=== Domestic legislation ===
Most of the bills discussed in the parliament originate within the Council of State. However, any member or group of members may introduce a bill, but usually these will not pass the committee phase. A third way to propose legislation was introduced in 2012: citizens may deliver an initiative for the parliament's consideration, if the initiative gains 50,000 endorsements from eligible voters within a period of six months. When delivered to the parliament, the initiative is dealt with in the same way as any other bill. Any bill introduced will initially be discussed by the members of the Parliament, prior to being sent to the committee to which it belongs. If the bill concerns several areas of legislation, the Grand Committee will first ask the other committees for opinions. If there is any concern about the constitutionality of the bill, the opinion of the Constitutional Committee is demanded. The Constitutional Committee works in non-partisan manner and uses the most distinguished legal scholars as experts. If the committee considers the bill to have unconstitutional elements, the bill must either be passed as a constitutional change or changed to be in concordance with the constitution. In most cases, the latter route is chosen.

The bills receive their final form in the parliamentary committees. The committees work behind closed doors but their proceedings are publicized afterwards. Usually the committees hear experts from special interest groups and various authorities after which they formulate the necessary changes to the bill in question. If the committee does not agree, the members in minority may submit their own version of the bill.

The committee statement is discussed by the parliament in two consecutive sessions. In the first session, the parliament discusses the bill and prepares its final form. In the first part of handling, a general discussion of the bill is undertaken. After this, the parliament discusses individual points of the bill and chooses between the bill proposed by the committee, minority opinions and the eventual other forms the members submit during the discussion. If the parliament wishes to do so, it may during the general discussion of the first handling submit the bill to the Grand Committee for further formulation. The bill is also always treated by the Grand Committee if the parliament decides to adopt any other form than the final opinion of the committee. The committee then formulates its own version of the bill and submits this to the parliament which then adopts either its former version or the version of the Grand Committee. The committee statements are influential documents in that they often used by the courts as indicative of the legislator's intent.

In the second session, the final formulation of the bill is either passed or dismissed. If the bill entails a change in constitution, the second session takes place only after the next election unless the parliament decides to declare the matter to be urgent by a majority of five-sixths. In constitutional matters, the bills are passed by a majority of two-thirds. In other cases, the simple majority of votes given is enough.

International treaties requiring changes to legislation are accepted by a simple majority in a single session. Treaties requiring changes to the constitution or changing the borders of Finland require a qualified majority of two-thirds.

=== EU legislation ===
The matters relating to the jurisdiction of the European Union are decided by the Council of the European Union and the European Parliament. However, as changes to European legislation are being prepared, the Parliament participates actively in formulating the government's position on these changes.

As the proceedings of the committees are public, European Union matters handled by the Parliament tend to become public after committee meetings. However, the government may ask the Parliament for a secret handling of an EU matter. This can be the case if the government does not want to reveal its position to foreign nations before the beginning of negotiations.

European Union legislation under preparation is brought to the Grand Committee by the Finnish government when they have received notice of the proposal from the European Commission. The Grand Committee discusses the matter behind closed doors, and if appropriate, requests opinions from the committees of the Parliament. Both the Grand Committee and the specialized committees hear expert opinions while preparing their opinions. Finally, the Grand Committee formulates its opinion of the proposal. However, in matters concerning the external relations of the European Union, the Finnish stance is formulated by the Committee for Foreign and Security Policy, rather than the Grand Committee.

The Finnish government is obligated by law to follow the parliamentary opinion when discussing the matter with the European Commission and other member states. The government may change the Finnish stance, but it is required to report such changes to the Parliament immediately.

After the European Union has made a legislative decision that is to be implemented by the Parliament, the matter is brought back to the parliament as with usual legislation. At this stage, the Finnish state is committed to passing a bill fulfilling the requirements demanded by the EU, and the Parliament must vote accordingly.

=== Other matters ===
Every member of parliament has the right to ask the government written questions. The questions are answered in writing within 21 days by a minister responsible for the matter and do not cause any further discussion. Furthermore, the parliament has a questioning session from time to time. In these, the members are allowed to ask short verbal questions, which are answered by the responsible ministers and then discussed by the parliament.

Any group of twenty members may interpellate. The motion of censure may be for the whole government or any particular minister. The motion takes the form of a question that is replied to by the responsible minister. If the parliament decides to approve the motion of censure, the committee responsible for the matter in question formulates the motion, which is then passed by the parliament.

The government may decide to make a report to the parliament in any matter. After discussion the parliament may either accept the report or pass a motion of censure. A passed motion of censure will cause the government to fall.

Any group of 10 members may raise the question of the legality of the minister's official acts. If such question is raised, the Constitutional Committee will investigate the matter, using all the powers of police. After the final report of the committee, the parliament decides whether to charge the minister in the High Court of Impeachment. The criminal investigation of the Constitutional Committee may also be initiated by the chancellor of Justice, Parliamentary Ombudsman or by any parliamentary committee. Similar proceedings may also be initiated against the chancellor of justice, Parliamentary Ombudsman or the judges of the supreme courts. The president of Finland may be also the target of a criminal investigation of the Constitutional Committee, but the parliament must accept the indictment by a majority of three-fourths and the charge must be treason, high treason or a crime against humanity.

== Members of the Parliament ==
Members of the Parliament are not employees and cannot voluntarily resign or be laid off. They can be granted leave or dismissal only with the consent of the Parliament. Members of the Parliament enjoy parliamentary immunity. Without the parliament's approval, members may not be prosecuted for anything they say in session or otherwise do in the course of parliamentary proceedings. MPs may not be prevented from carrying out their work as members of parliament. They may be charged with crimes they have committed in office only if the parliament gives a permission to that end with a majority of five-sixths of given votes. For other crimes, they may be arrested or imprisoned only for crimes which carry a minimum punishment of six months in prison, unless the parliament gives permission to arrest the member.

The members receive a monthly taxable remuneration (palkkio) of 7,637 €, which is raised to 7,944 € after four years of service and to 8,393 € after twelve years. It is legally a salary, with the exception that the remuneration is not subject to the unemployment insurance fee—as they not covered by the unemployment benefit system that is funded by the fees. In addition, all MPs automatically receive a tax-free compensation of expenses between 986,81 € and 1809,15 € depending on the location of ones home. MPs from districts far from Helsinki can thus receive compensation for a second apartment in Helsinki. MPs may travel for free within the country by train, bus, or plane for purposes related to legislative work. Within the Helsinki metropolitan area, they may freely use taxis. Eduskunta is responsible for its own finances and the minister of finance is obliged to include their proposal to the state budget as is regardless of their own opinion.

MPs are aided in their work by personal assistants, although there are fewer assistants than MPs and not every MP has one. Assistants are formally employed by the Parliamentary Office, but can be selected and directed by the MP.

A member who is elected to the European Parliament must choose between the two parliaments because a double mandate is not permissible. On the other hand, the members may have any municipal positions of trust, and it is common for them to have a position in a municipal council. If MPs leave the parliament or die in office, they are replaced by candidates from the same list they were elected from in the previous election, in order of their electoral score (the D'Hondt quotient). Those so selected are from a substitute list, the substitutes being named at the same time as the electoral results are announced. Finland does not have a by-election system.

The members have an unlimited right to discuss the matters at hand. However, they must behave in a "solemn and dignified manner" and refrain from personal insults. If the member breaks against this rule in the session of parliament, they may be interrupted by the speaker. Grave breaches of order may be punished by two weeks' suspension from office by the decision of the Parliament. If a member is convicted of an intentional crime for a term in prison or of an electoral crime to any punishment, the parliament may decide to dismiss the member if two-thirds of the votes given are for dismissal.

The mean age of MPs was 50 as of 2026, the oldest MP being 74 years (Kimmo Kiljunen) and youngest 26 years (Olga Oinas-Panuma). 92 women were elected as MPs in the 2023 election (46%), though due to midterm replacements the number of female MPs rose to 93 (46.5%). There is only one current MP of foreign origin (0.5%). 7.5% of MPs are Swedish-speakers, slightly higher than their proportion of the population (5.2%).

== Parliament House ==
Before the construction of the Parliament House, the Parliament met in various different locations. The Diet of Finland, the predecessor of the Parliament, was tetracameral and did not regularly meet together. The Diet of Porvoo (1809) met in various buildings in Porvoo, with Borgå gymnasium as the main hall, the noble and burgher estates meeting in the town hall and the peasants' estate in chief judge Orraeus' house. However, the Diet assembled only once and did not reconvene until 1863. In 1863, the Diet began regular meetings again, reconvening in the House of Nobility (Ritarikatu 1). This building still stands, but is no longer in governmental use. Whereas nobility continued to meet there, in 1891 a new House of the Estates was inaugurated for the other estates (clergy, burghers and peasants). This building is today owned by the state and occasionally used by the Government of Finland. When the modern 200-member Parliament was founded in 1906, they first met in the local voluntary fire brigade house (Keskuskatu 7), because there was not enough space for them in the House of Estates. The fire brigade house was demolished in 1967 and replaced by the Helsinki World Trade Center building. In 1911, the Heimola House, a building designed by Onni Tarjanne, was inaugurated at Yliopistonkatu 5. This building was demolished in 1969 and replaced by a 9-story office building.

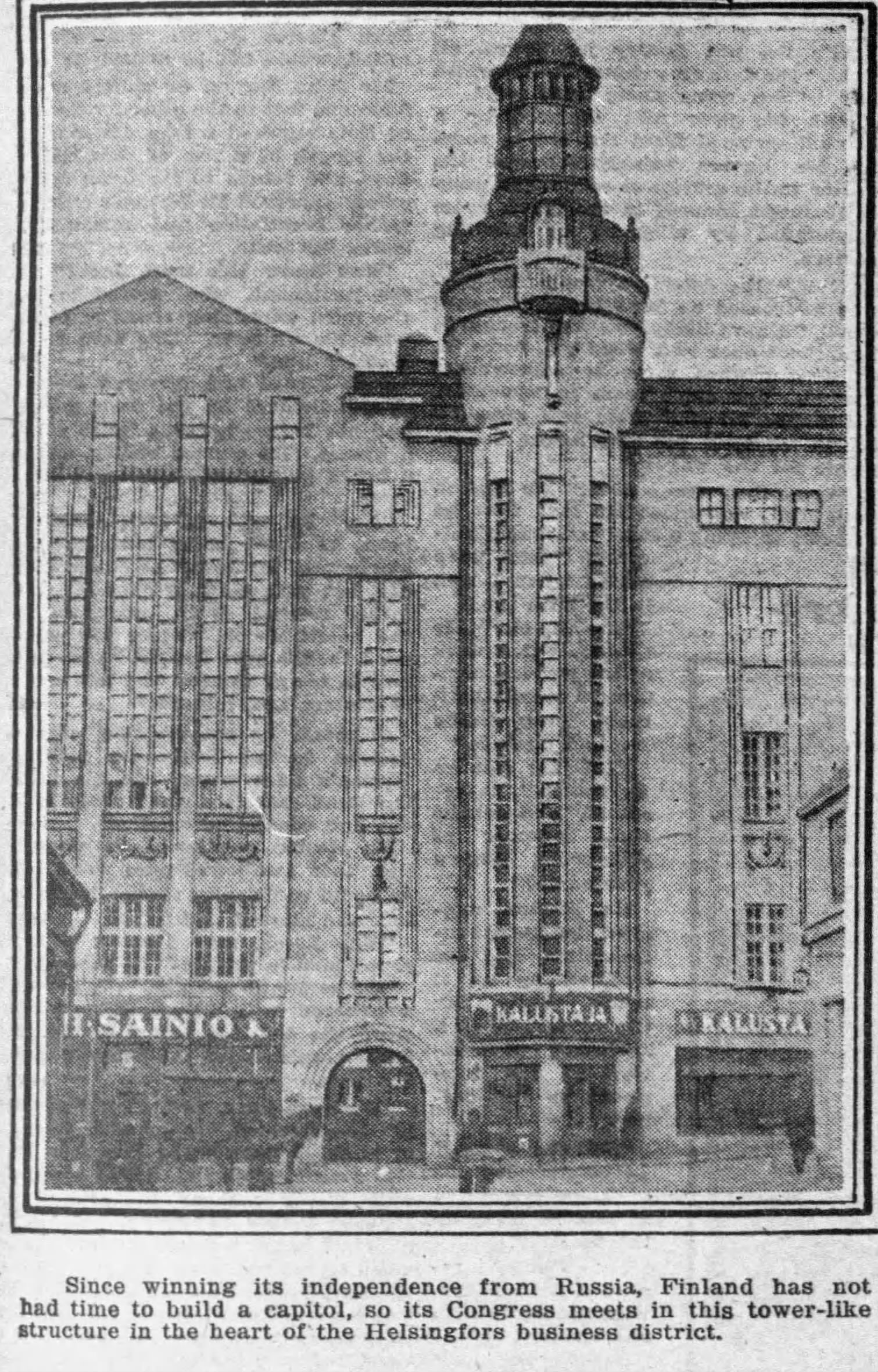
A 1923 photograph of Heimola House by Frank G. Carpenter

In 1923 a competition was held to choose a site for a new Parliament House. Arkadianmäki, a hill beside what is now Mannerheimintie, was chosen as the best site. An architectural competition was held in 1924, and it was won by the firm Borg–Sirén–Åberg with their proposal, Oratoribus. Johan Sigfrid Sirén (1889–1961), who was mainly responsible for preparing the proposal, was tasked with designing the Parliament House. The building was constructed 1926–1931 and was officially inaugurated on 7 March 1931. Ever since then, and especially during the Winter War and Continuation War, it has been the scene of many key moments in the nation's political life.

Parliament House was designed in the classic style of the 1920s. The exterior is reddish Kalvola granite. The façade is lined by fourteen columns with Corinthian capitals. The first floor contains the main lobby, the speaker's reception rooms, the newspaper room, the Information Service, the Documents Office, the messenger centre, the copying room, and the restaurant and separate function rooms. At both ends of the lobby are marble staircases leading up to the fifth floor.

The second or main floor is centered around the Chamber. Its galleries have seats for the public, the media and diplomats. Also located on this floor are the Hall of State, the Speaker's Corridor, the Government's Corridor, the cafeteria and adjacent function rooms.

The third floor includes facilities for the Information Unit and the media and provides direct access to the press gallery overlooking the Session Hall. The Minutes Office and a number of committee rooms are also located here.

The fourth floor is reserved for committees. Its largest rooms are the Grand Committee Room and the Finance Committee Room. The fifth floor contains meeting rooms and offices for the parliamentary groups. Additional offices for the parliamentary groups are located on the sixth floor, along with facilities for the media.

Notable later additions to the building include the library annex, completed in 1978, and a separate office block, called Pikkuparlamentti, completed in 2004.

The building underwent extensive renovations in the years 2007–2017 as part of the preparation for Finland's centennial independence celebration.

== Election results ==
=== 2023 ===
Result of the election held on 2 April 2023:

Party	Votes	%	Seats	+/–
National Coalition Party	644,555	20.82	48	+10
Finns Party	620,981	20.06	46	+7
Social Democratic Party	617,552	19.95	43	+3
Centre Party	349,640	11.29	23	–8
Left Alliance	218,430	7.06	11	–5
Green League	217,795	7.04	13	–7
Swedish People's Party	133,518	4.31	9	0
Christian Democrats	130,694	4.22	5	0
Movement Now	74,995	2.42	1	0
Freedom Alliance	27,558	0.89	0	New
Liberal Party – Freedom to Choose	14,982	0.48	0	0
For Åland	11,452	0.37	1	0
Power Belongs to the People	8,469	0.27	0	New
Crystal Party	4,894	0.16	0	New
Animal Justice Party	3,107	0.10	0	0
Pirate Party	3,058	0.10	0	0
Communist Party	3,044	0.10	0	0
Blue-and-Black Movement	2,307	0.07	0	New
Finnish Reform Movement	1,362	0.04	0	0
Finnish People First	1,225	0.04	0	0
Lapland's Non-Aligned Joint List	1,231	0.04	0	New
Feminist Party	1,114	0.04	0	0
The Open Party	985	0.03	0	New
Welfare and Equality	923	0.03	0	New
Non-aligned Coalition	514	0.02	0	New
Sustainable Initiative	494	0.02	0	New
Citizens' Union	169	0.01	0	0
Independents	556	0.02	0	0
Total	3,095,604	100.00	200	0
Valid votes	3,095,604	99.54		
Invalid/blank votes	14,434	0.46		
Total votes	3,110,038	100.00		
Registered voters/turnout	4,277,487	72.71		
Source: Election Information and Results Service

== See also ==
- List of members of the Parliament of Finland, 2023–2027
- Parliament of Åland
- Sámi Parliament of Finland
- Senate of Finland
- Finnish Government
- Politics of Finland
- List of political parties in Finland
- List of Finnish MPs who died in office
