= Suomalainen naisliitto =

Suomalainen naisliitto (Hfrs), is a non-profit Finnish women's organization which was established in 1907.

Suomalainen naisliitto was founded in 1907 by Lucina Hagman. Hagman as well as other leading members, such as Maikki Friberg and Tekla Hultin, were affiliated with the Young Finnish Party.

The Hfrs promoted women's emancipation by arranging courses and leactures. Until the 1940s, it published its own magazine, the Naisten Ääni; Maikki Friberg was its editor in 1907–1927. Nowadays Naisten Ääni https://www.naistenaani.fi/ is a data base collecting biographies of women.

The Suomalainen naisliitto publishes the magazine Minna since 1981.

== Presidents ==
- 1907–1909 Tekla Hultin
- 1909–1914 Lucina Hagman (first time)
- 1914–1922 Olga Oinola (first time)
- 1922–1927 Lucina Hagman (second time)
- 1927–1932 Hilja Vilkemaa (first time)
- 1932–1934 Olga Oinola (second time)
- 1934–1946 Hedvig Gebhard
- 1946–1953 Ida Sarkanen
- 1953–1969 Hilja Vilkemaa (second time)
- 1969–1970 Helle Kannila
- 1970–1974 Pirkko Aro
- 1974–1980 Inkeri Savolainen
- 1980–1989 Raija Virtanen
- 1989–1994 Vappu Hakkarainen
- 1994–1995 Tuula Nieminen
- 1996–1997 Paula Starck
- 1998–2001 Pirjo Norvama
- 2002–2003 Päivi Mattsoff
- 2004–2007 Marja-Riitta Tervahauta
- 2008–2009 Oili Påwals
- 2010–2014 Maija Kauppinen
- 2014–2015 Kirsti Ojala
- 2016-2018 Leena Ruusuvuori
- 2019 Kirsti Ojala
- 2020-2023 Eva Tervonen
- 2024- Nuppu Rouhiainen
