= Eero Järnefelt =

Finnish realist painter (1863–1937)

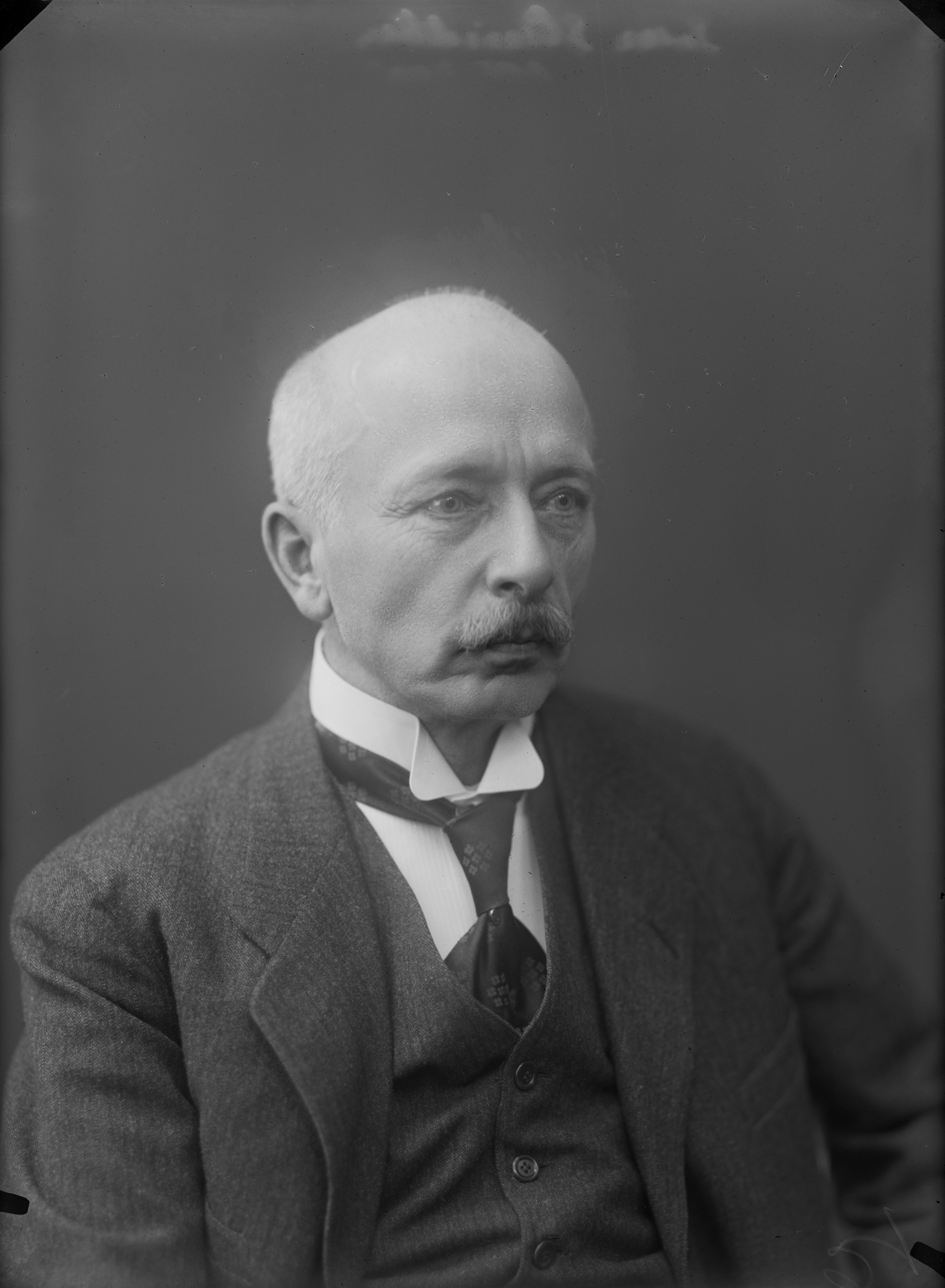
- Born: Erik Nikolai Järnefelt; 8 November 1863; Viipuri, Grand Duchy of Finland
- Died: 15 November 1937 (aged 74); Helsinki, Finland
- Known for: Painter

Erik "Eero" Nikolai Järnefelt (8 November 1863 – 15 November 1937) was a Finnish painter and art professor. He is best known for his portraits and landscapes of the area around Koli National Park, in the North Karelia region of Finland. He was a medal winner at the Paris Exposition Universelle of 1889 and 1900, taught art at the University of Helsinki and was chairman of the Finnish Academy of Fine Arts.

== Biography ==
He was the son of General Alexander Järnefelt and Baroness Elisabeth Järnefelt (née Clodt von Jürgensburg). He came from a Swedish-speaking Finnophile family of artists, writers and composers descended from the Baltic aristocracy. Several of his eight siblings also became well-known: Kasper (a literary critic), Arvid (a judge and writer), Armas (a composer and conductor) and Aino (wife of Jean Sibelius).

Self and family
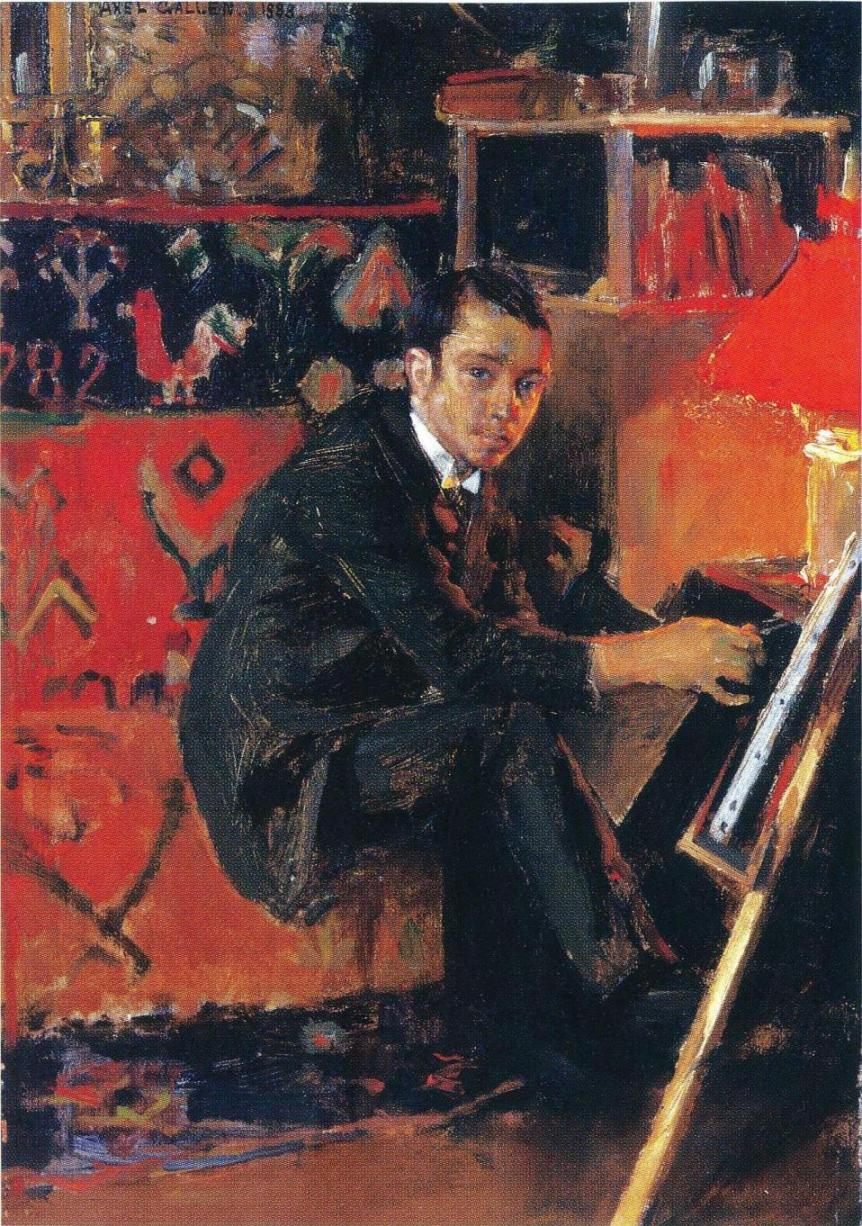
Portrait of Järnefelt by Akseli Gallen-Kallela, 1888

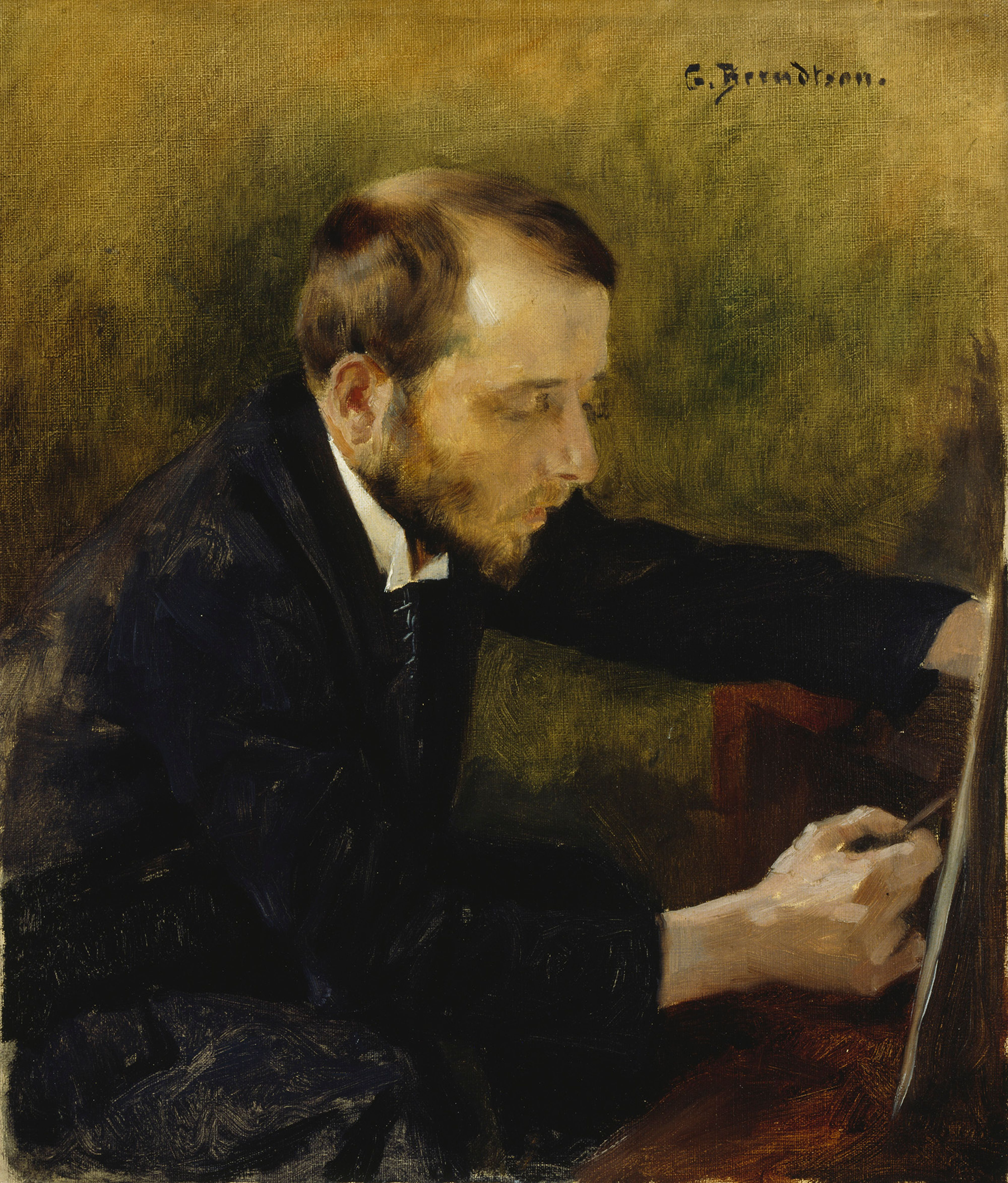
Portrait by Gunnar Berndtson in 1892

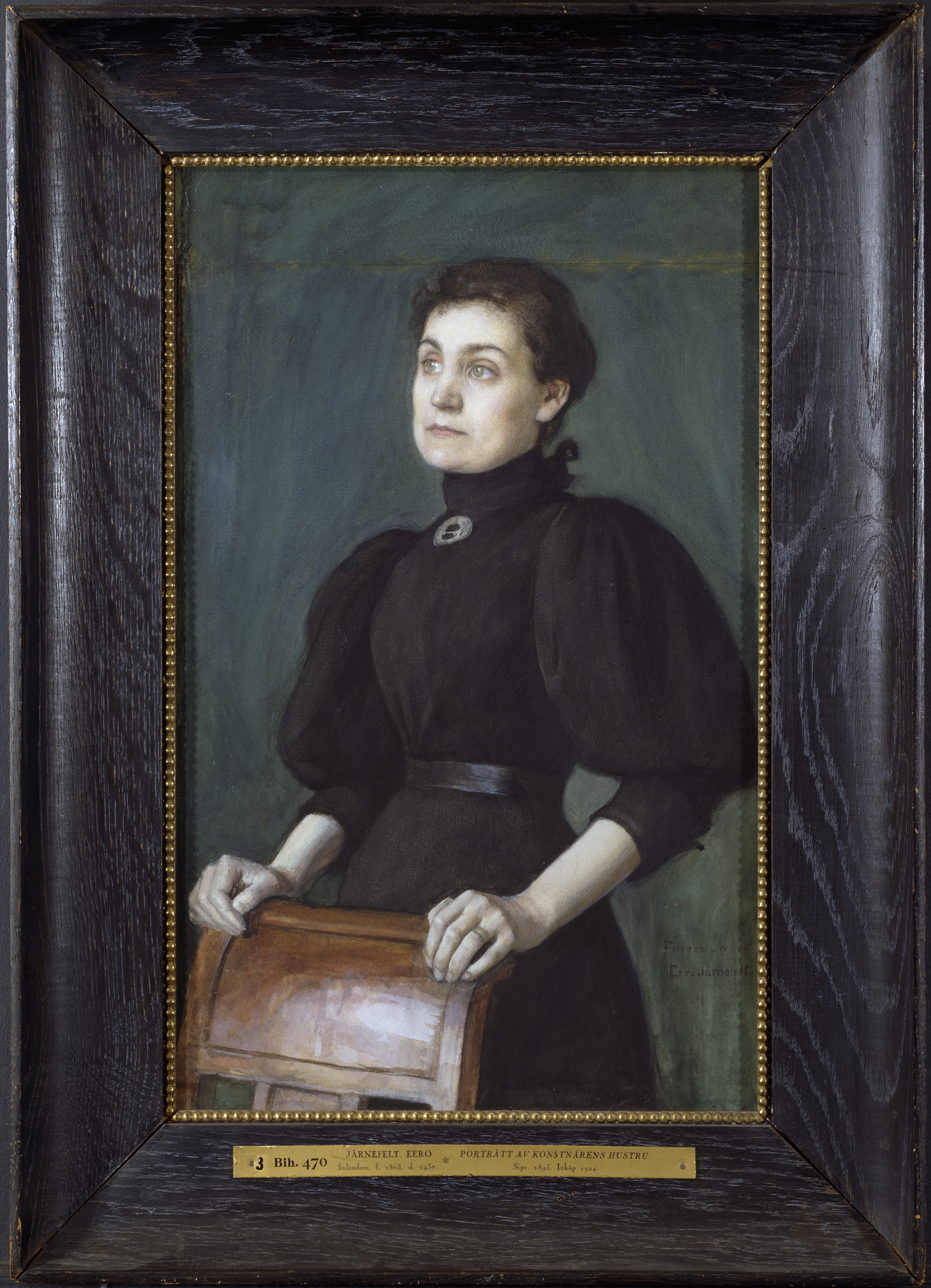
Portrait of his wife Saimi by Järnefelt in 1895

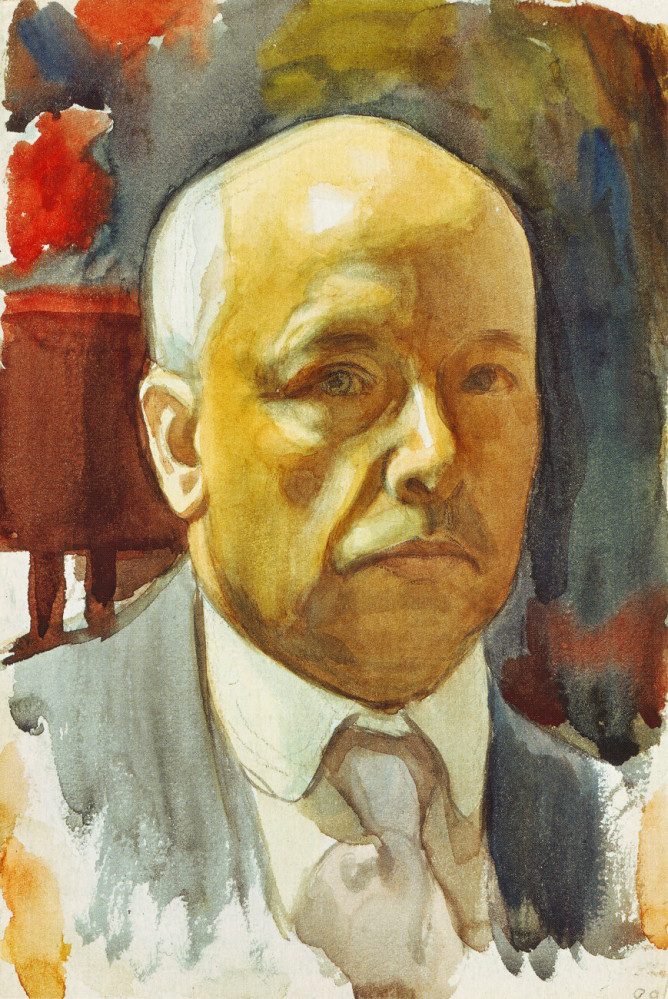
Self-Portrait, unknown date

After graduating from a private academy, he studied at the Academy of Fine Arts, Helsinki from 1874 to 1878, the Imperial Academy of Arts from 1883 to 1886 (where one of his teachers was his uncle, Mikhail Clodt), and the Académie Julian in Paris from 1886 to 1888, where he studied with Tony Robert-Fleury. A major influence was the Naturalism of Jules Bastien-Lepage.

In 1889, he married the actress Saimi Swan. In 1892, he made his first trip to the area around Koli with Juhani Aho and his wife, the painter Venny Soldan-Brofeldt. He was impressed with the scenery there and would continue to visit regularly until 1936.

In 1893, he traveled to Finland where he sketched and photographed agricultural workers which inspired his most famous painting, Under the Yoke (Burning the Brushwood). Later, he made several study trips; to Italy in 1894 and Crimea in 1899. That same year, he helped organize an international exhibition in Saint Petersburg, sponsored by Mir Iskusstva.

In 1901, he built a home that he named "Suviranta" (Summer Beach) at the artists' colony near Lake Tuusula, designed by Usko Nyström. He lived there only until 1917 when he moved to Helsinki, but it is still owned and used by his family.

From 1902 to 1928, he taught drawing at the University of Helsinki. He was appointed professor there in 1912 and served as chairman of the Finnish Academy of Fine Arts. His last major work was an altarpiece for the church in Raahe, which he completed in 1926. A major retrospective was held in 2013, which included several previously unknown works.

== Selected paintings ==
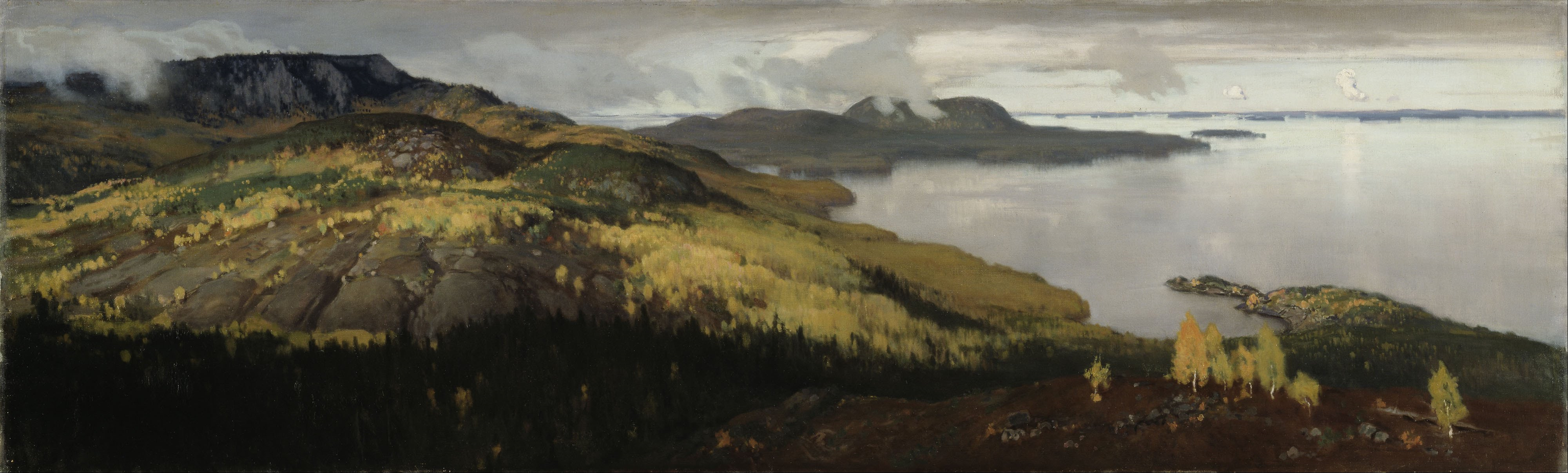
Autumn Landscape of Lake Pielisjärvi, 1899 (fi)

General works
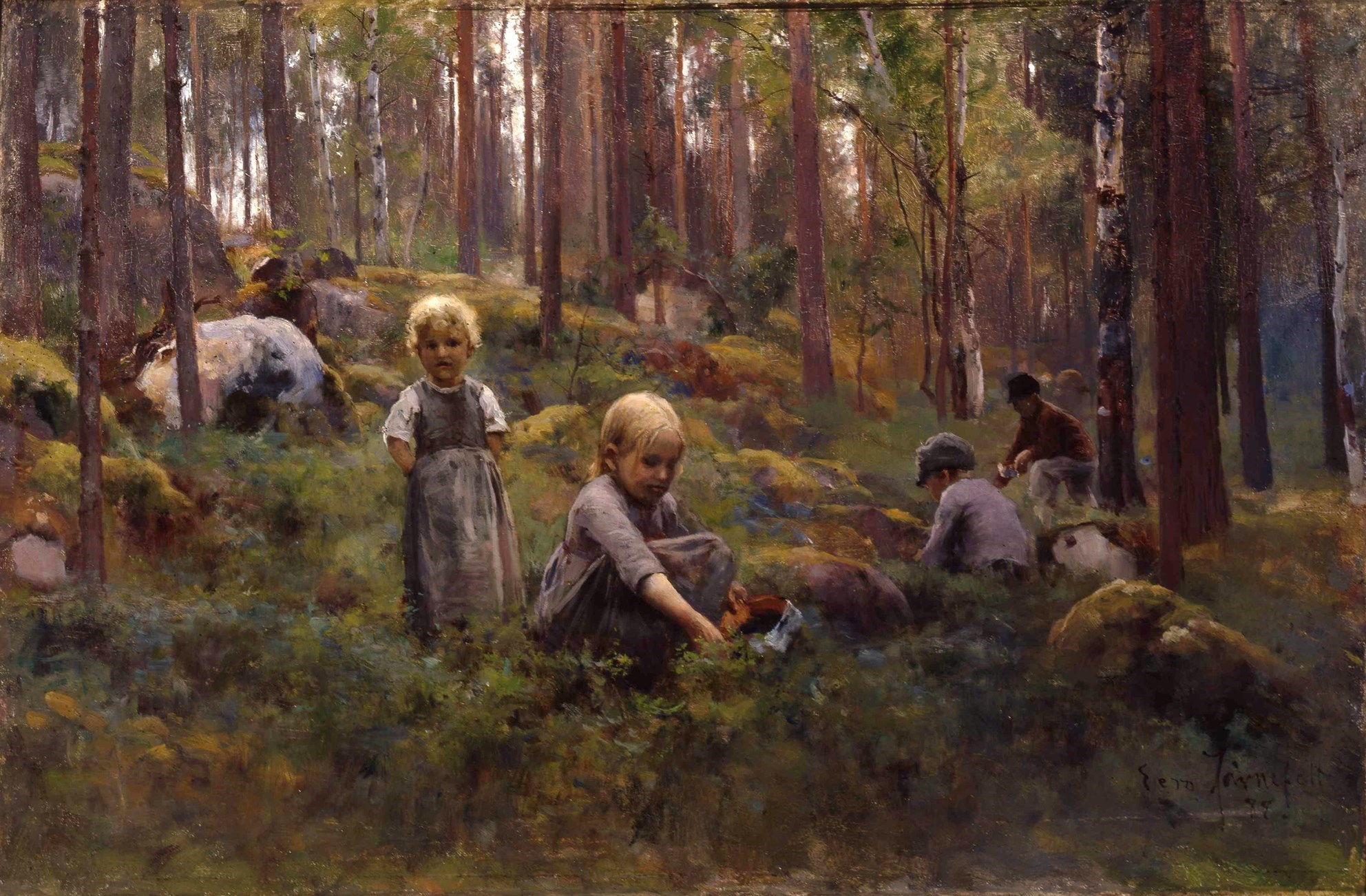
Berry Pickers, 1888

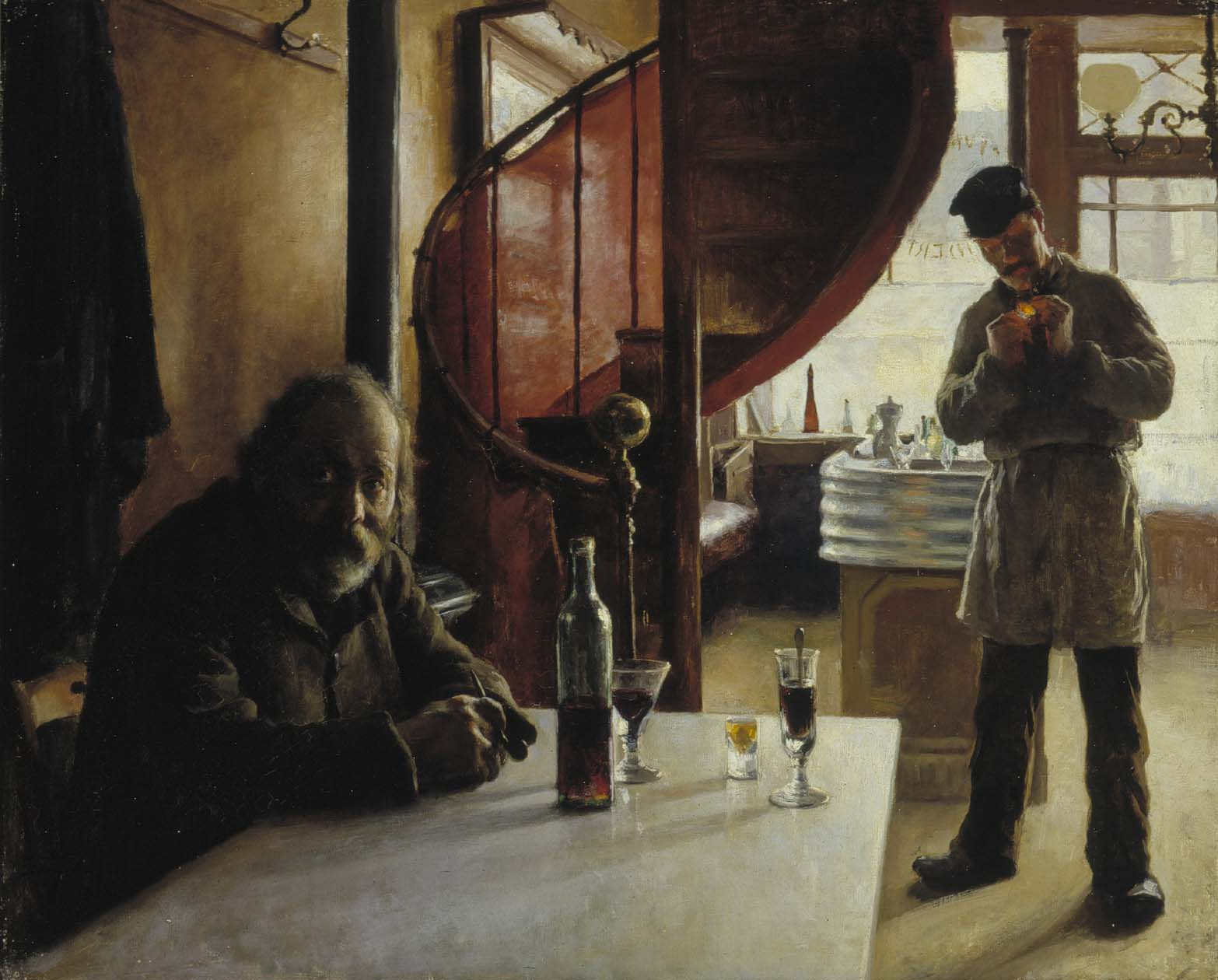
French Wine Bar, 1888 (fi)

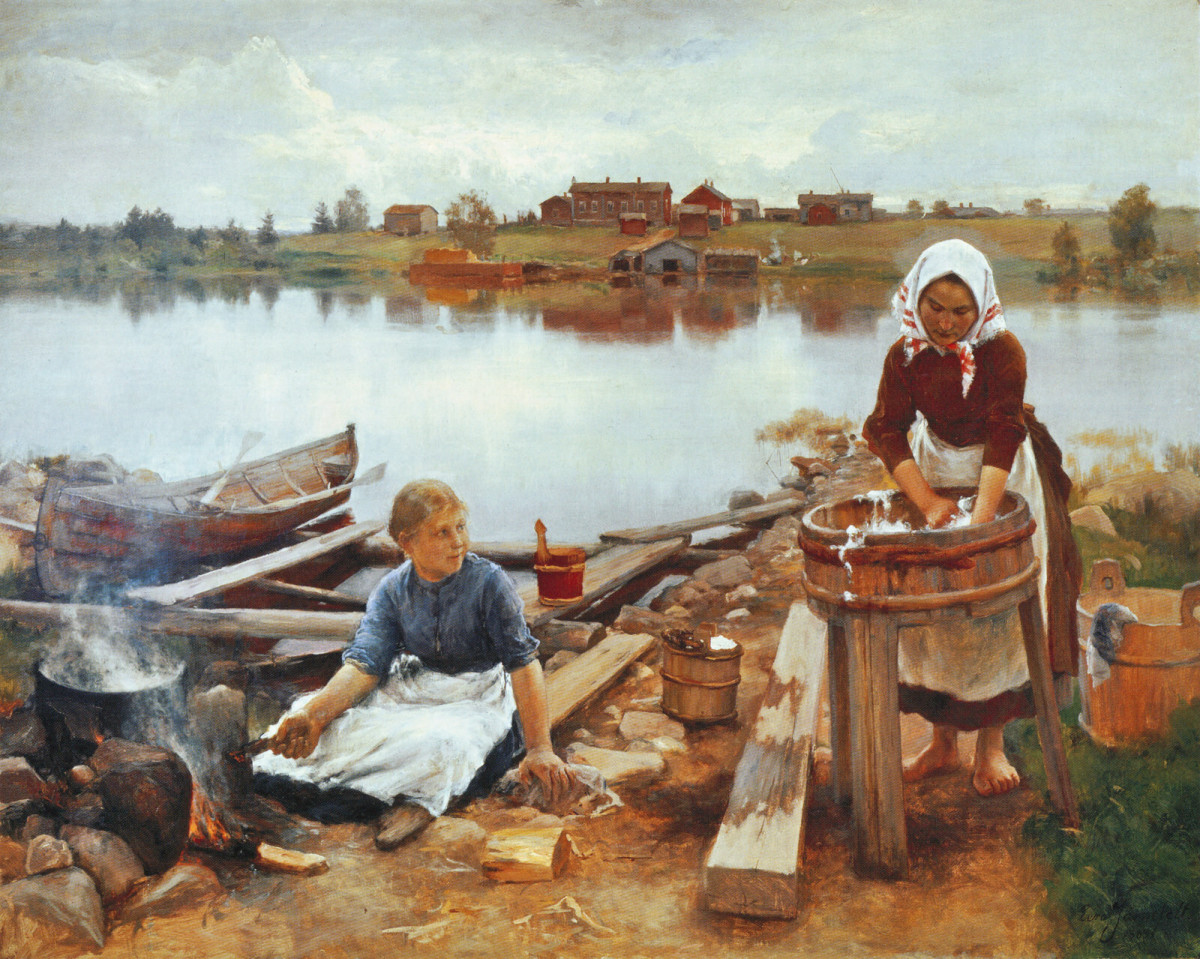
Laundry at the River Bank, 1889 (fi)

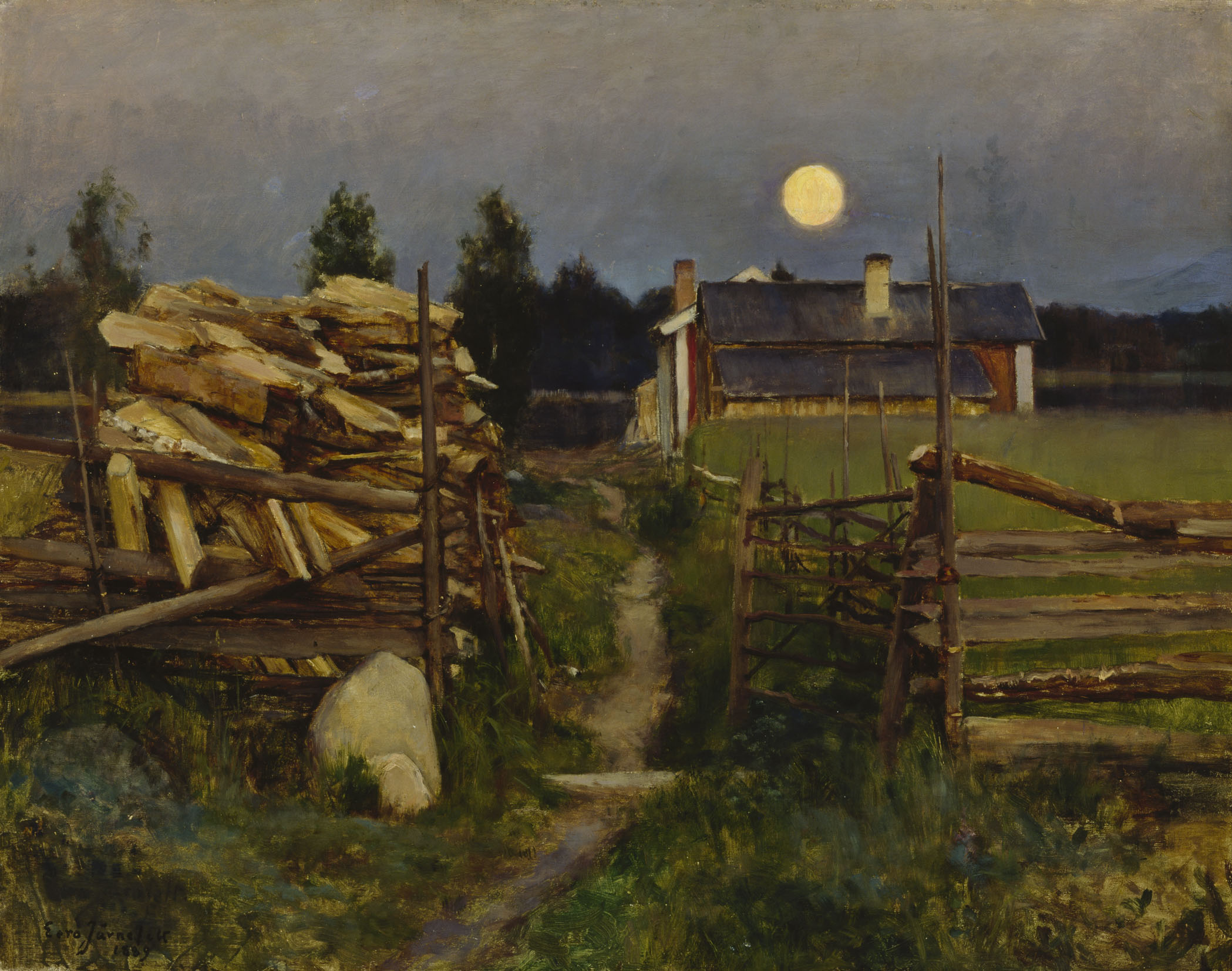
Summer Night Moon, 1889 (fi)

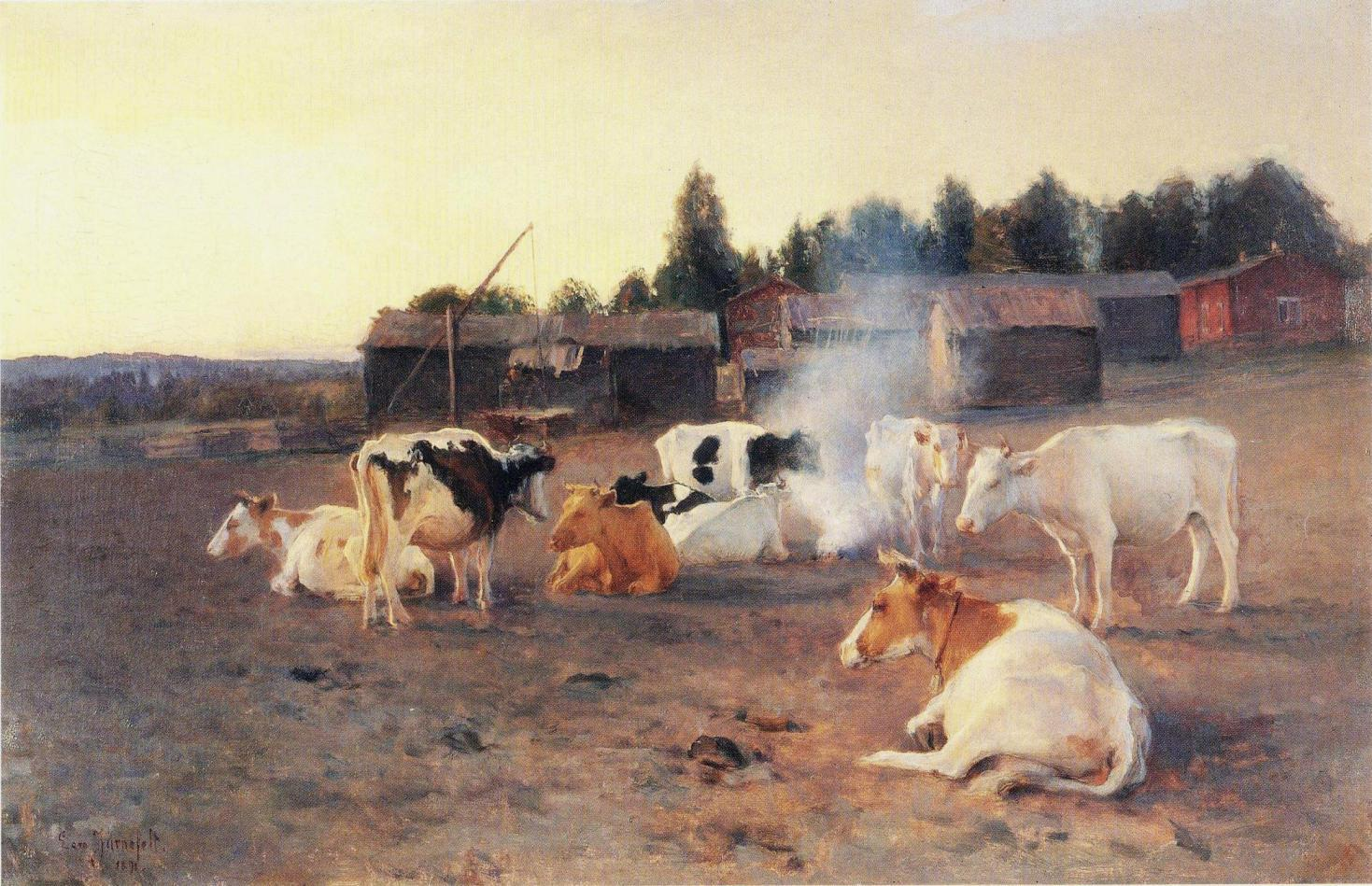
Cows in Turf Smoke, 1891 (fi)

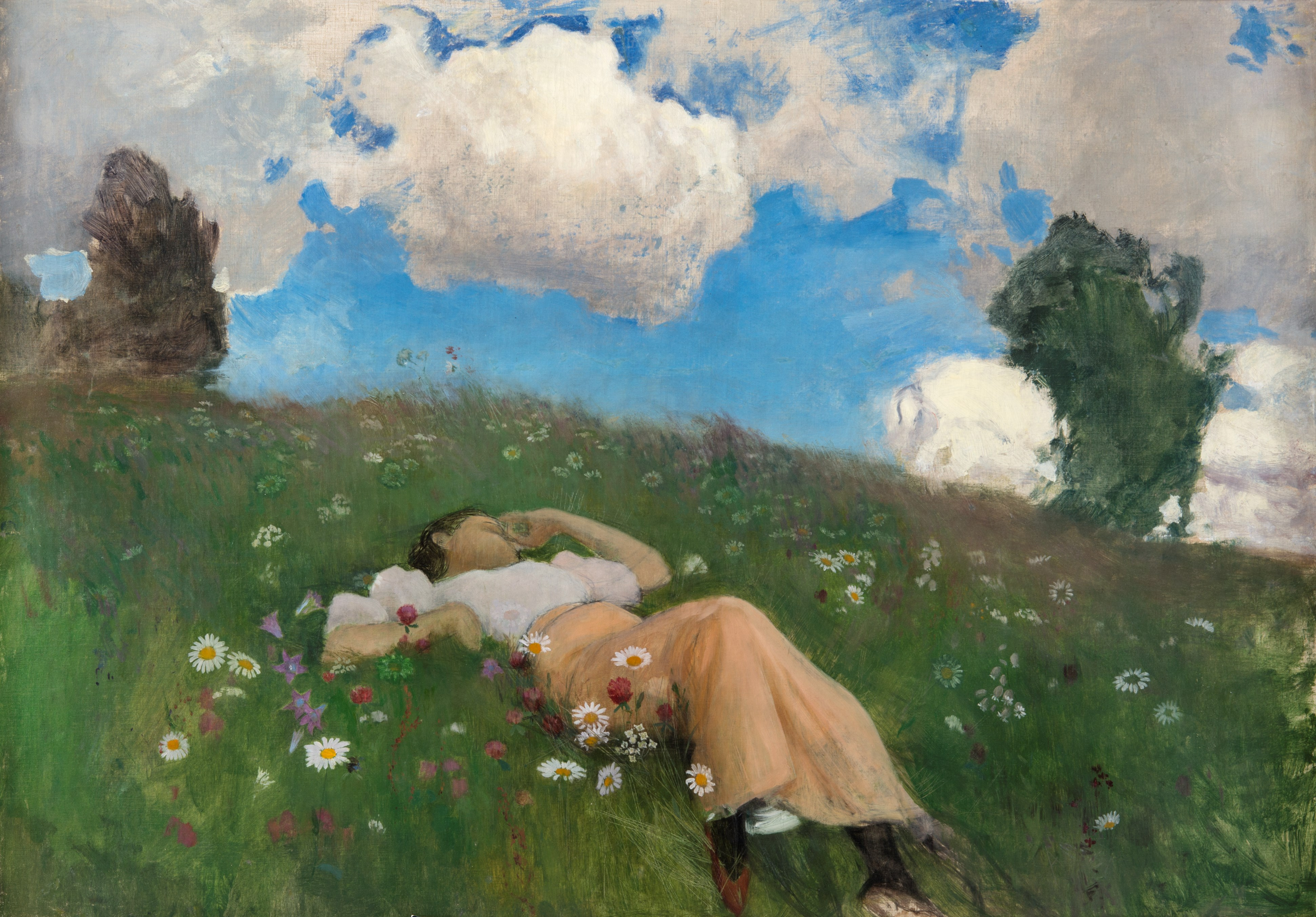
Saimi in the Meadow, 1892

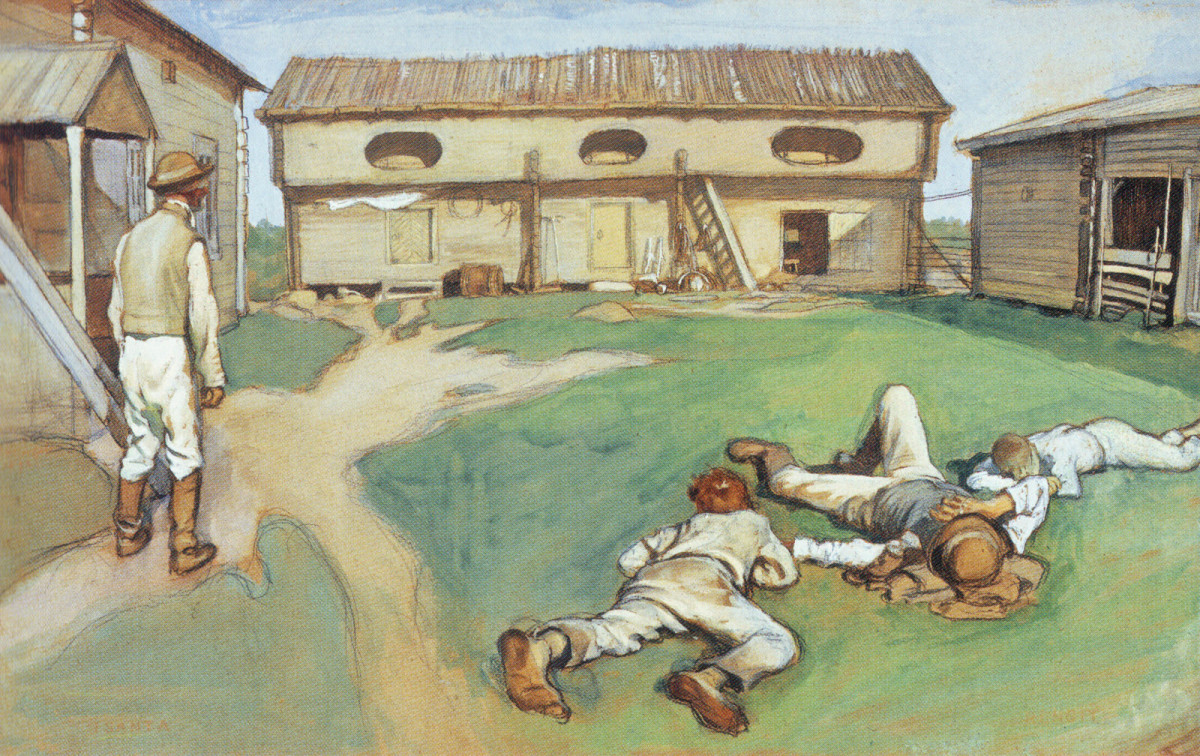
Householder and the Farmhands, 1893

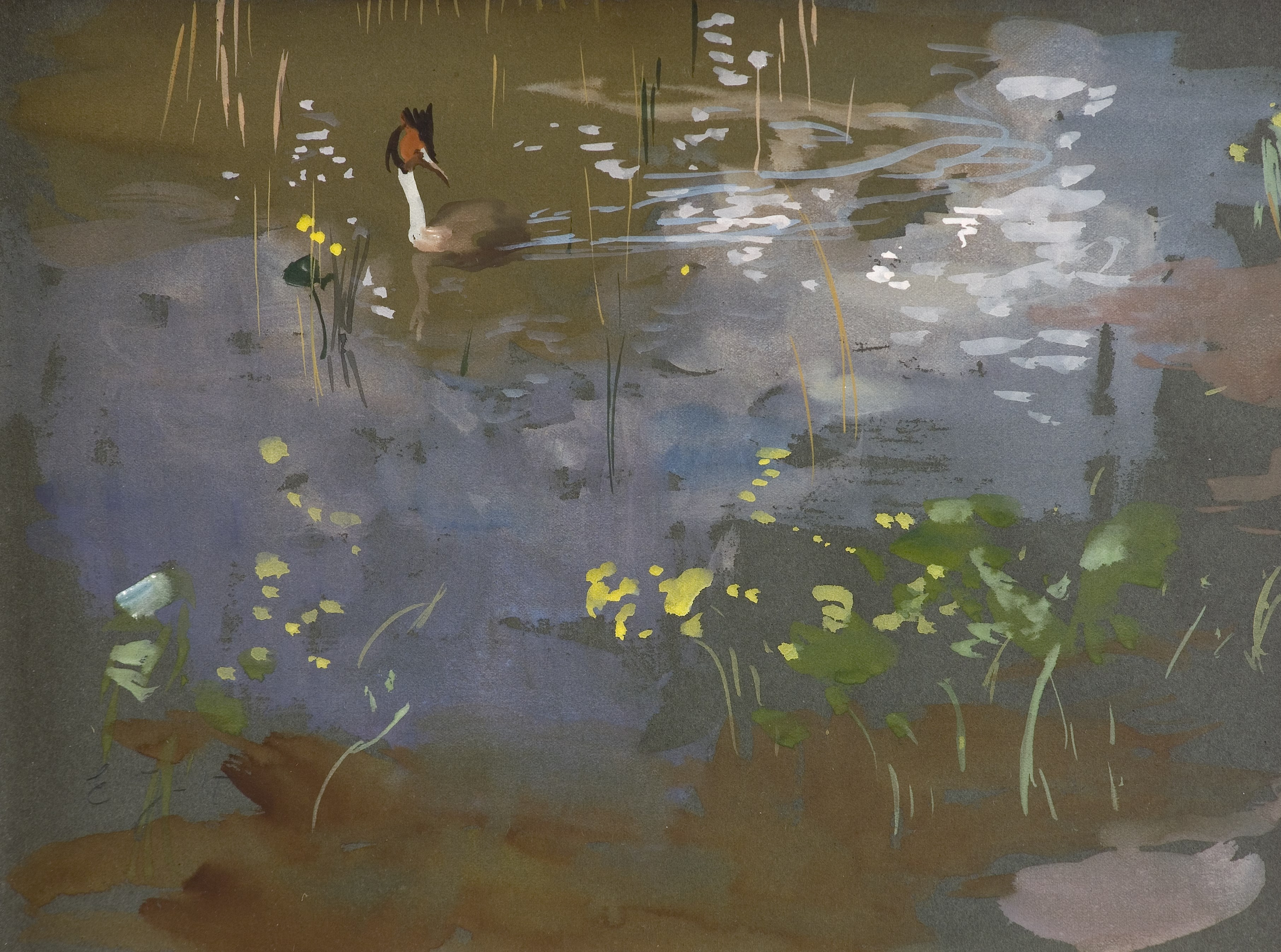
Great Crested Grebe, unknown date

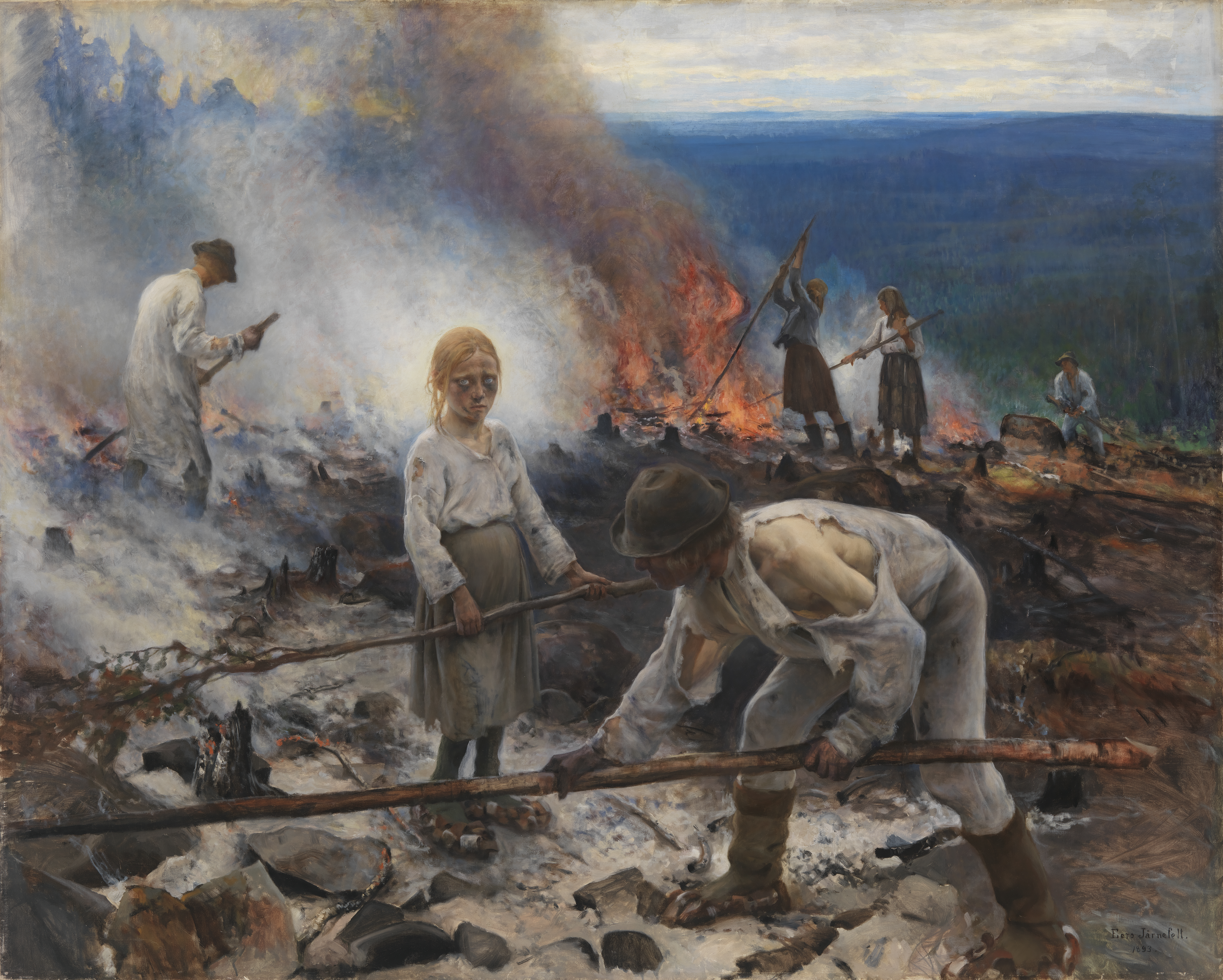
Under the Yoke (Burning the Brushwood), 1893 (fi)

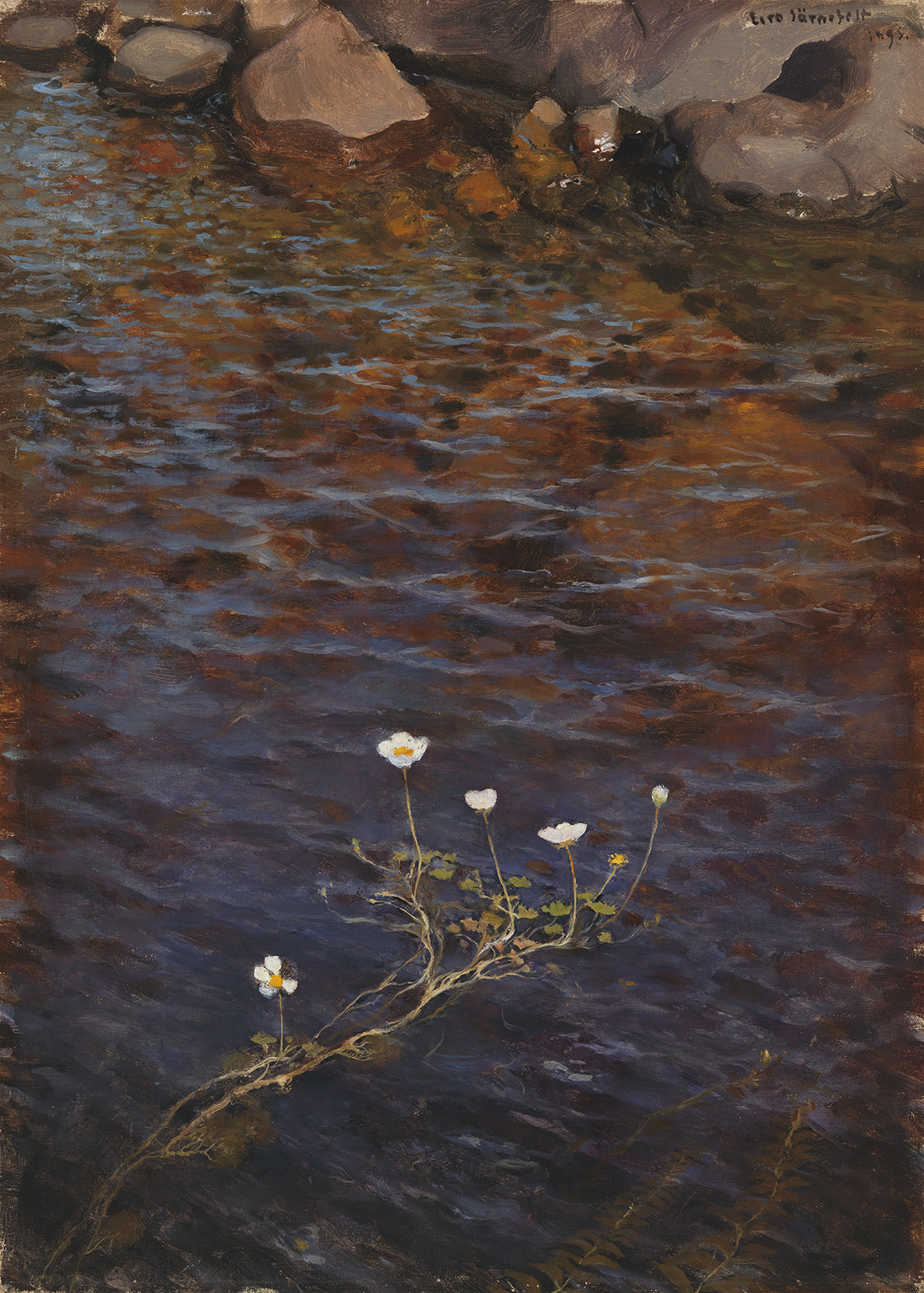
Pond Water Crowfoot and Shorestones, 1895 (fi)

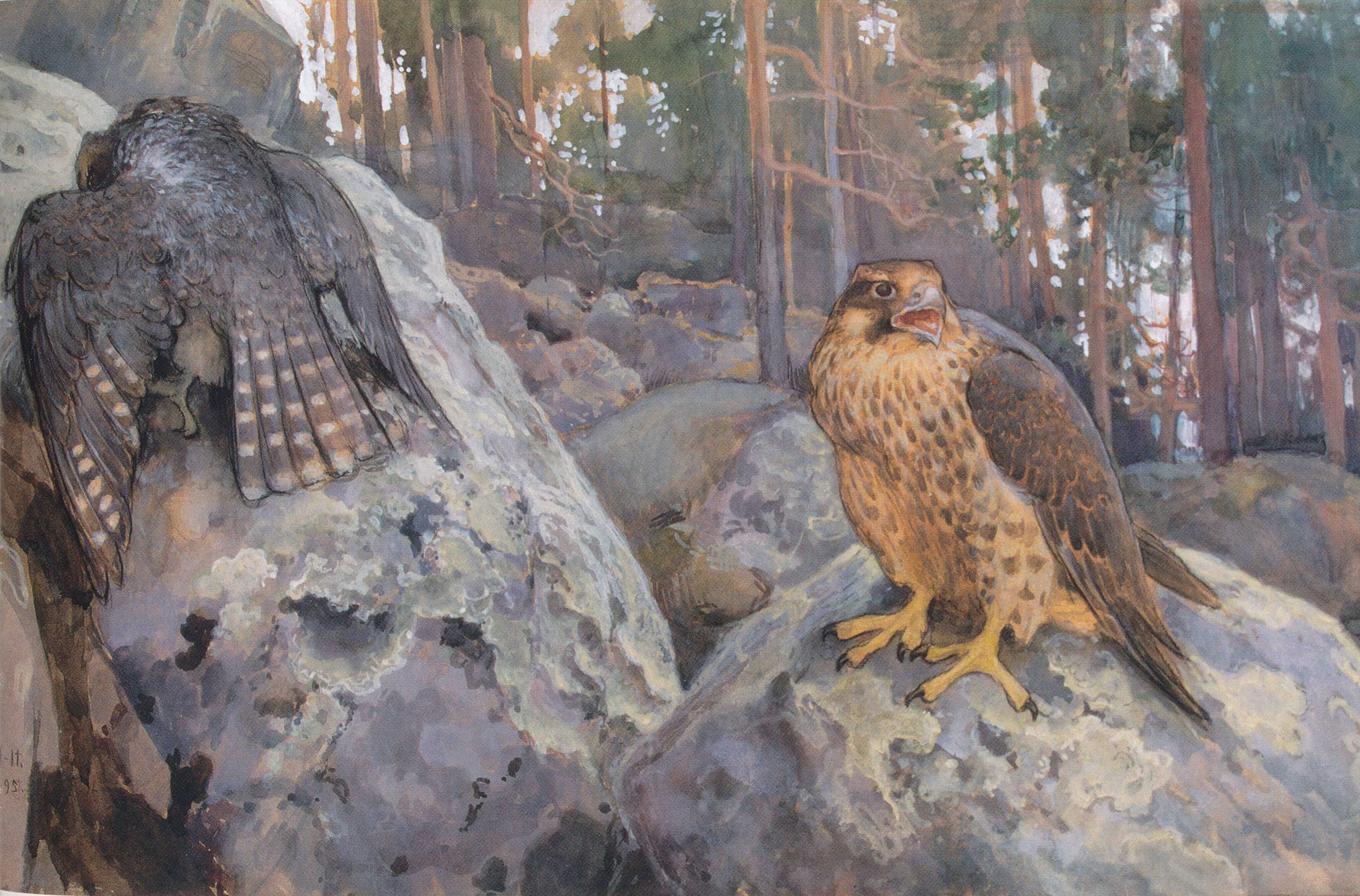
Falcons in the Forest, 1895

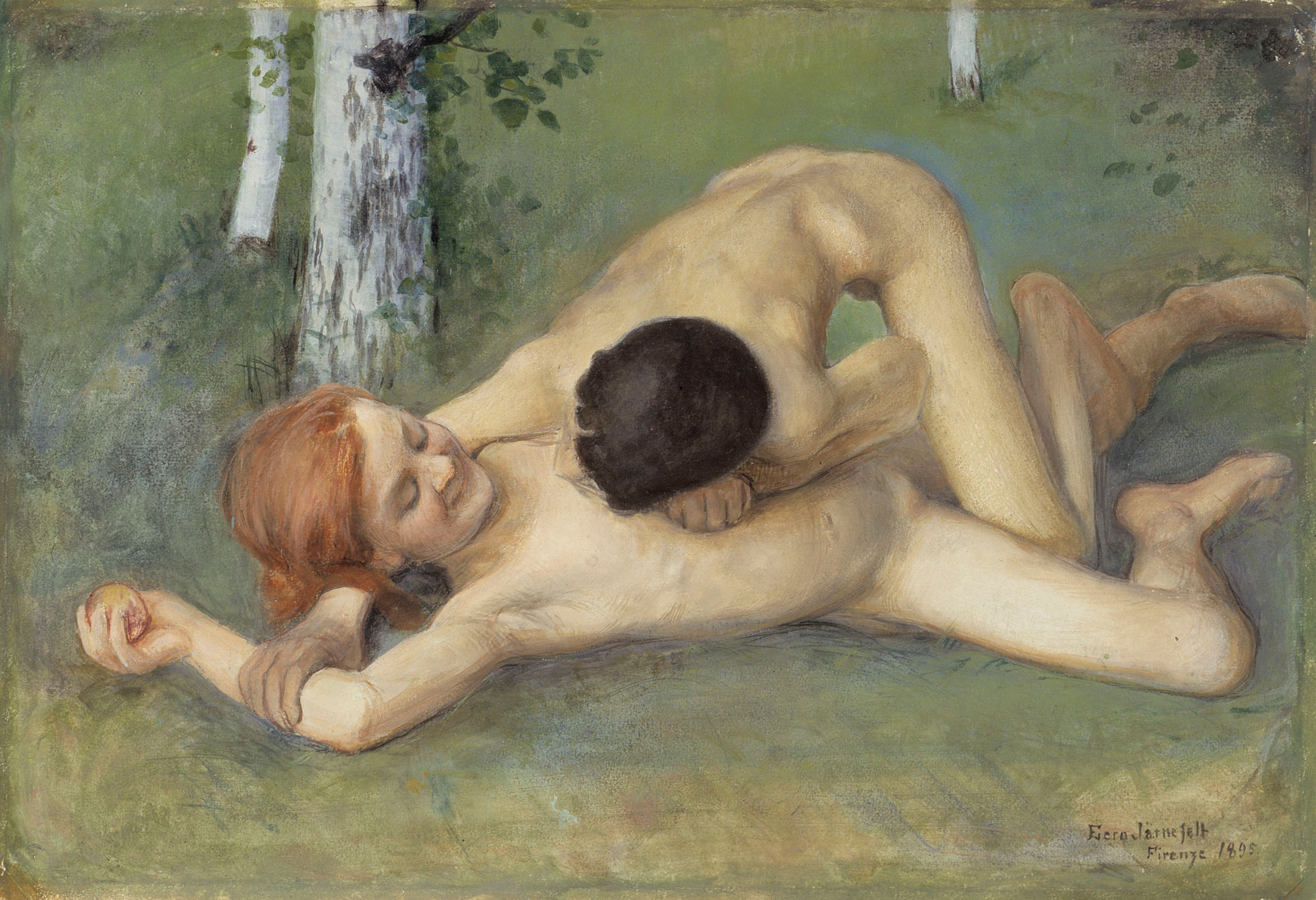
Children playing, 1895 (Note: Art historian Carl G. Lauren particularly notes Järnefelt's ability to depict naked teenagers in an innocent way.)

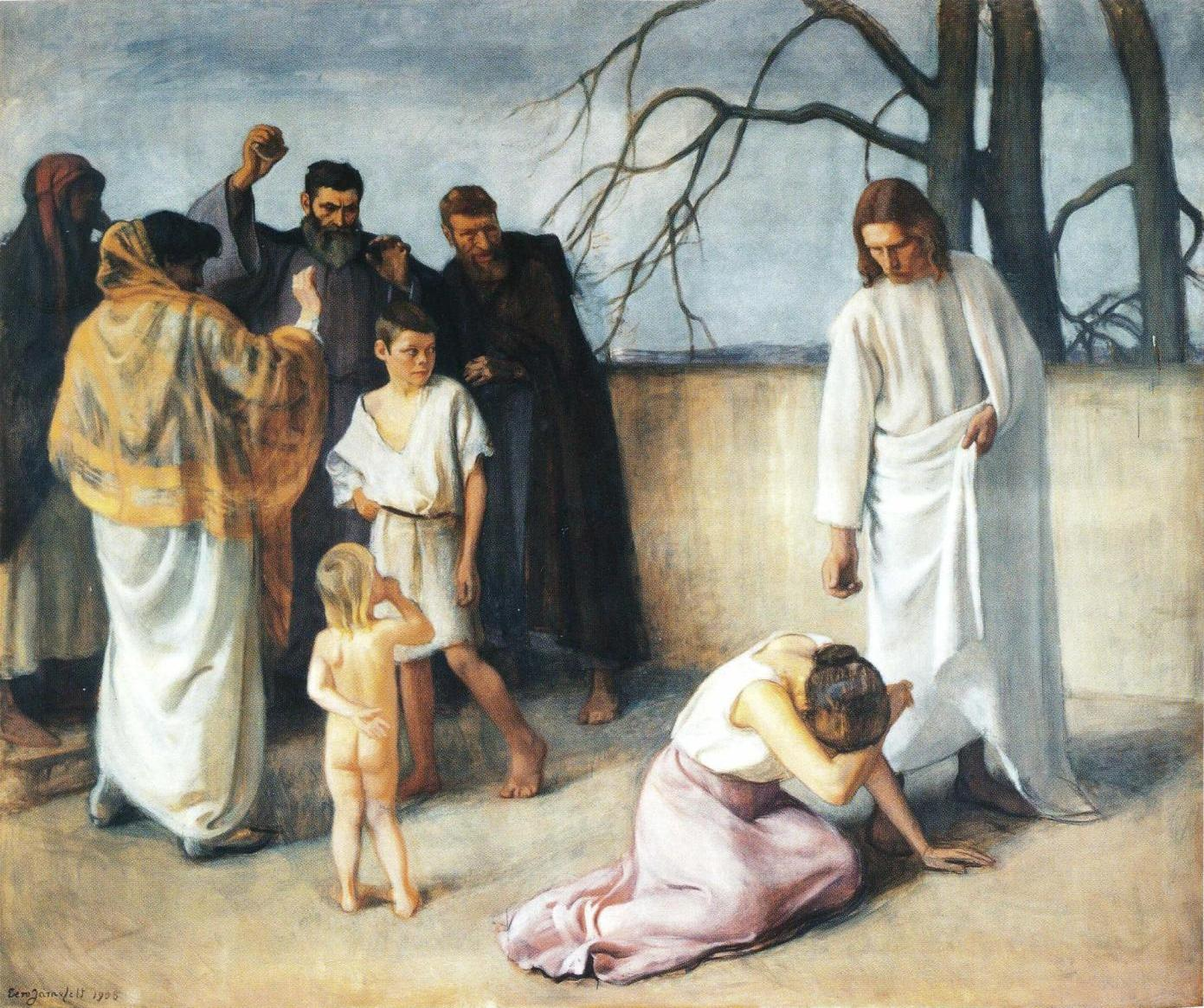
Jesus and the Sinful Woman, 1908 (fi)
(Note: Altar painting, located in Lieto Church.)

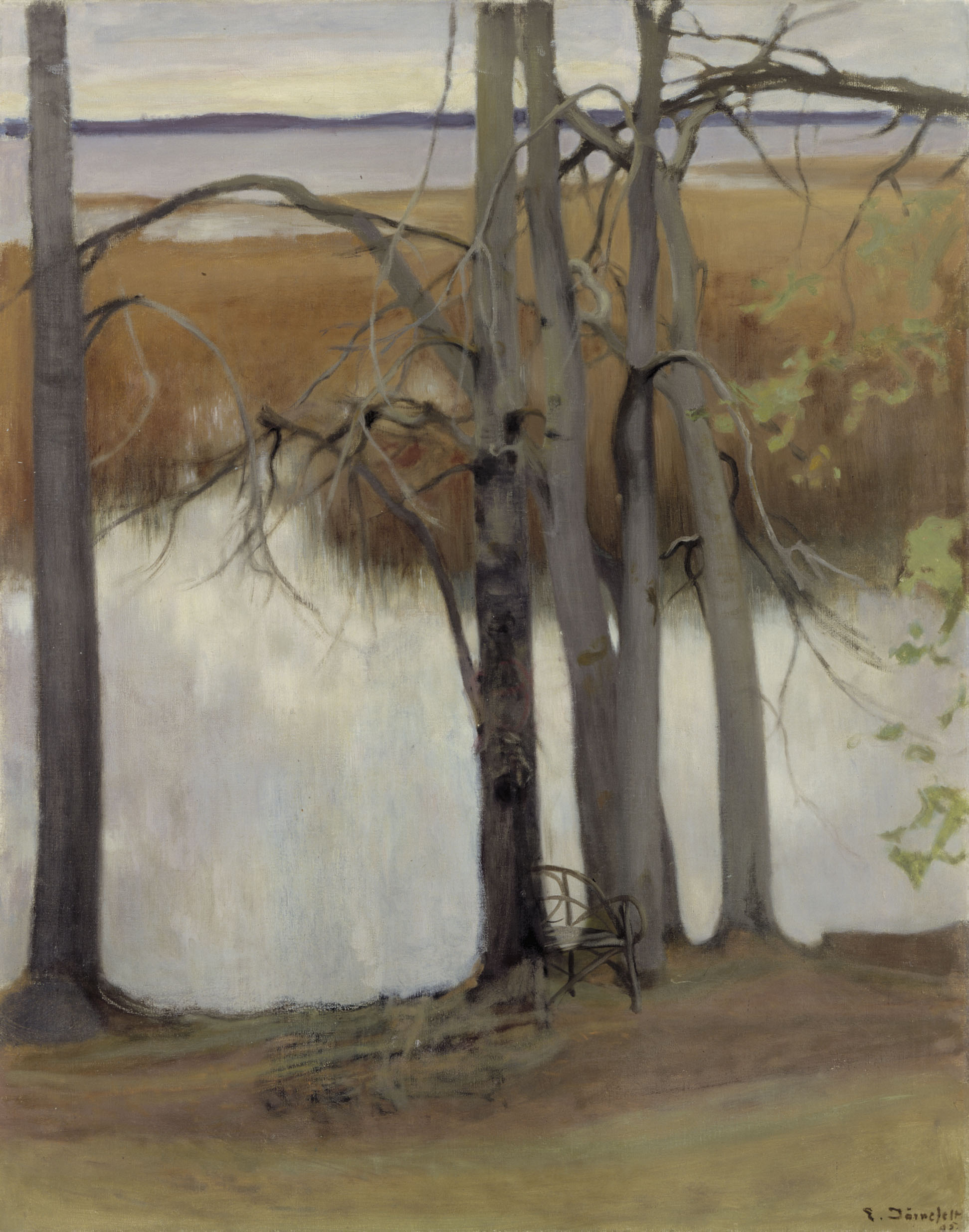
Lake Shore with Reeds, 1905 (fi)

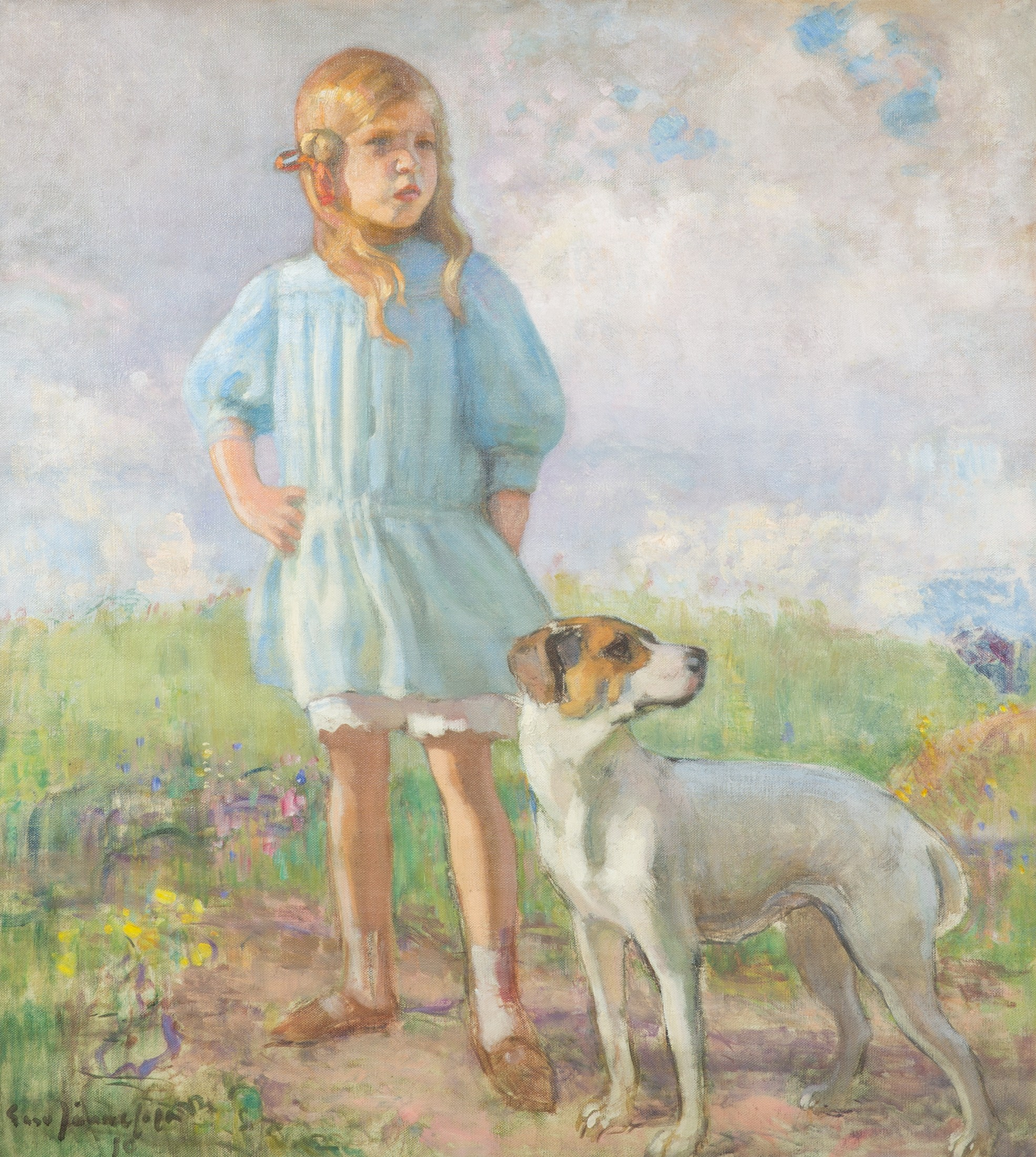
Girl with a Dog, 1910

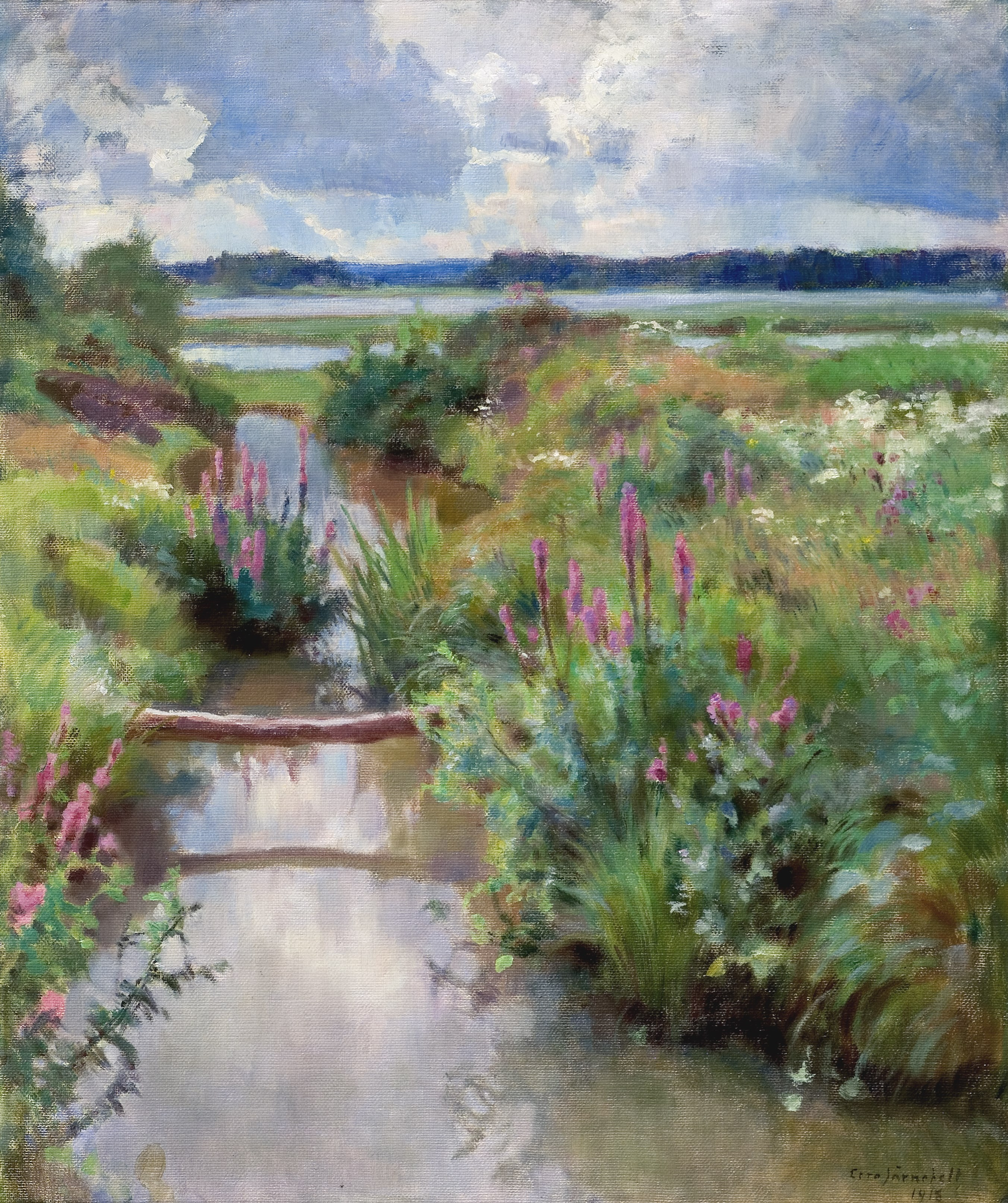
Blooming Summer, 1918

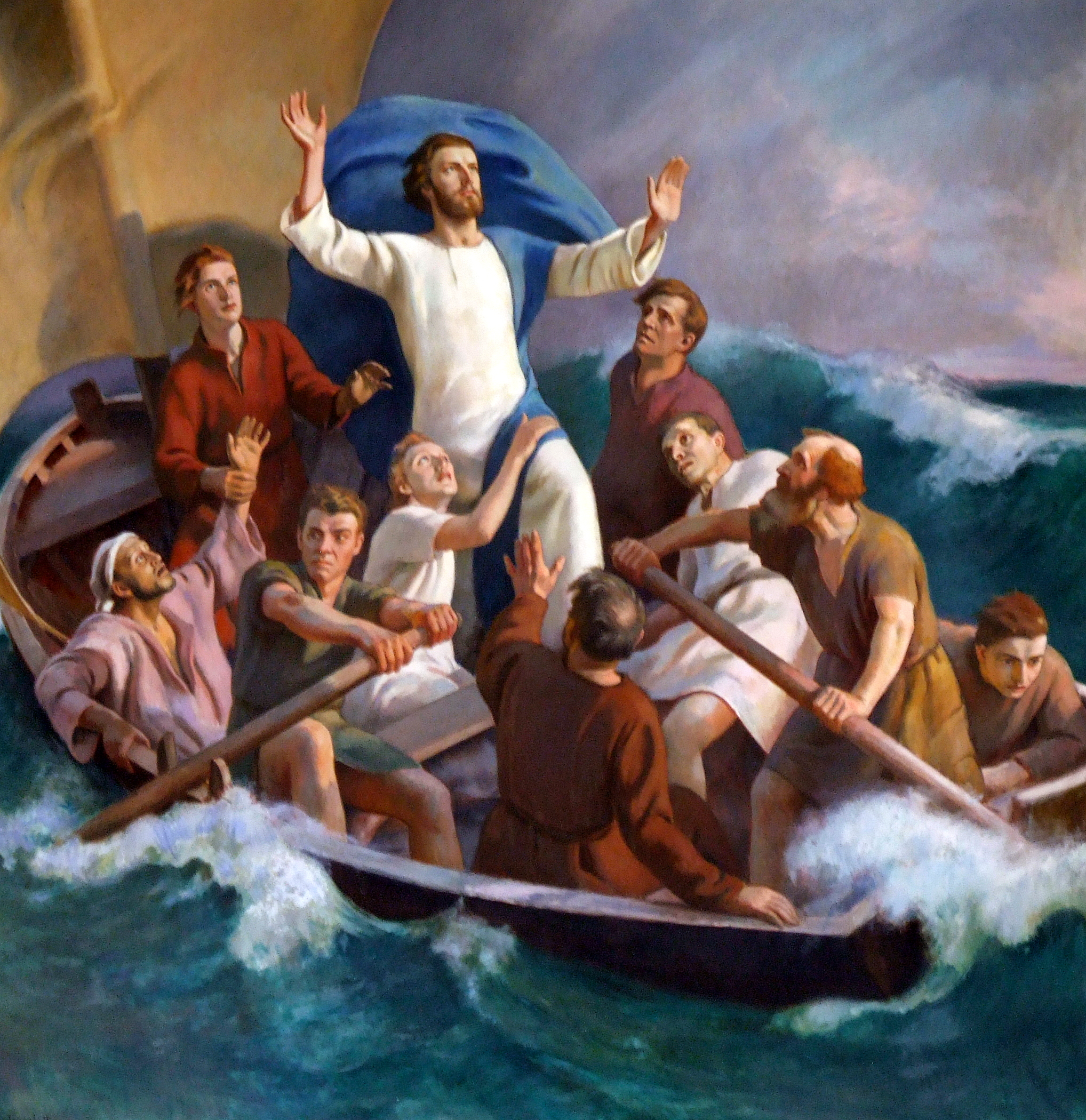
In a Storm with Jesus, 1926
(Note: Altar painting, located in Raahe Church. Järnefelt himself would have preferred the name Awakening of Hope.)

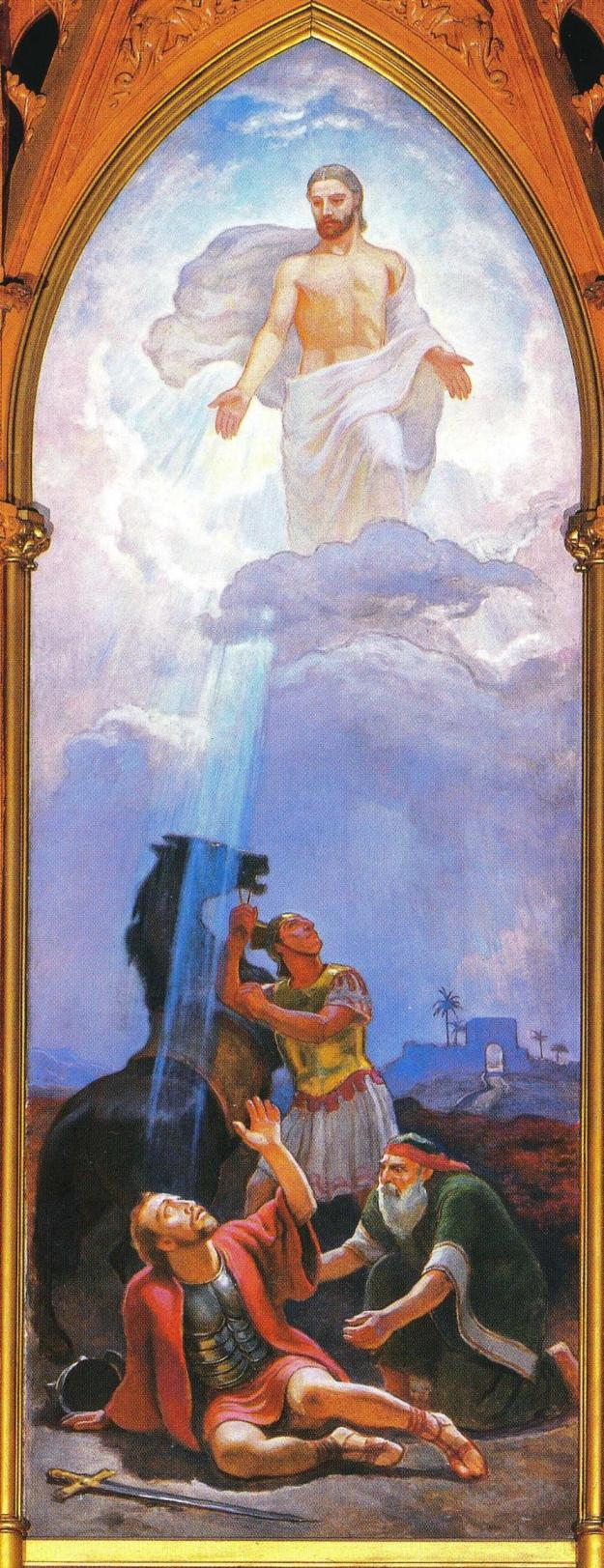
Conversion of Paul the Apostle, 1932
(Note: Altar painting, located in St. John's Church, Helsinki.)
Portraits
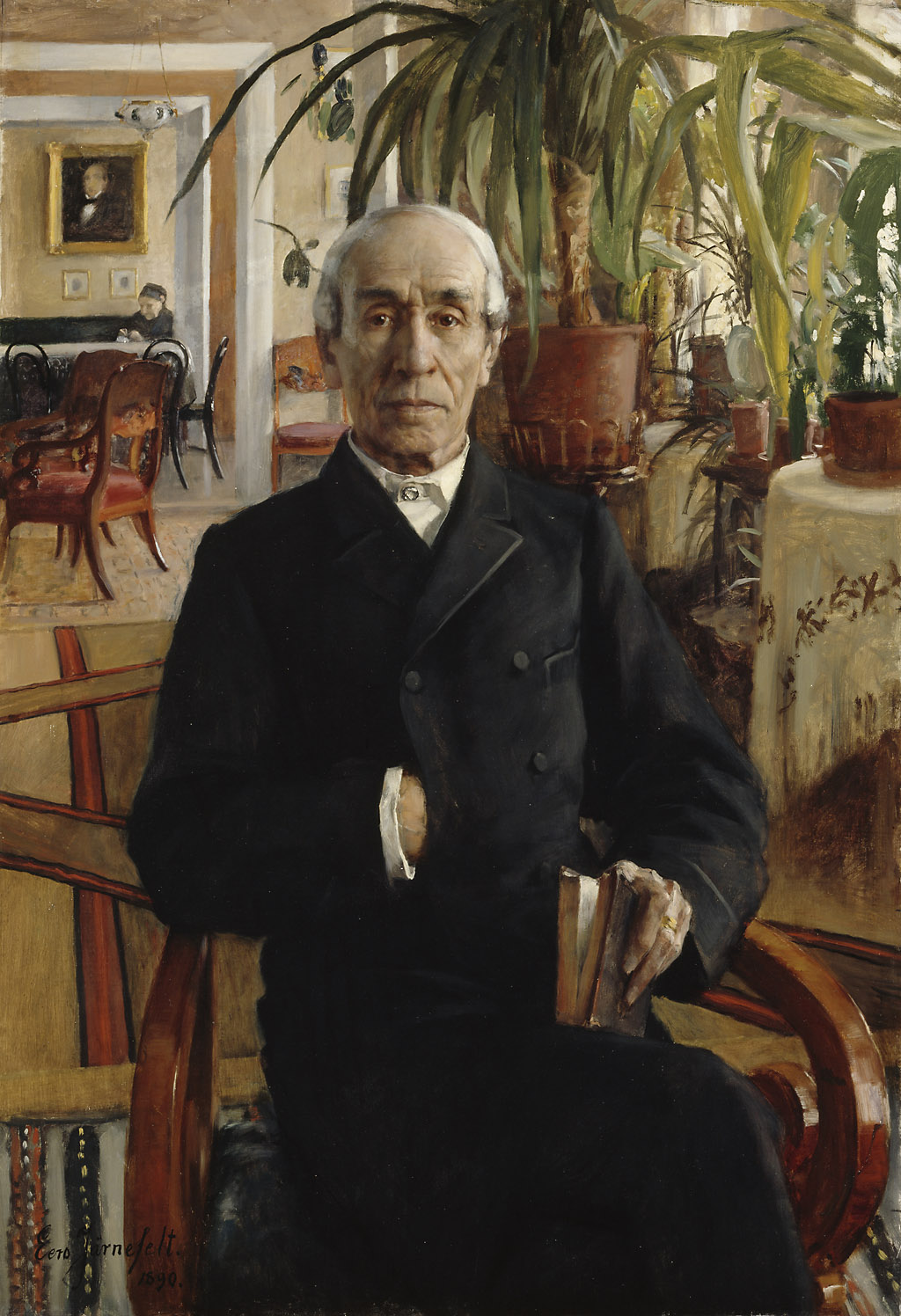
Johan Philip Palmén, 1890

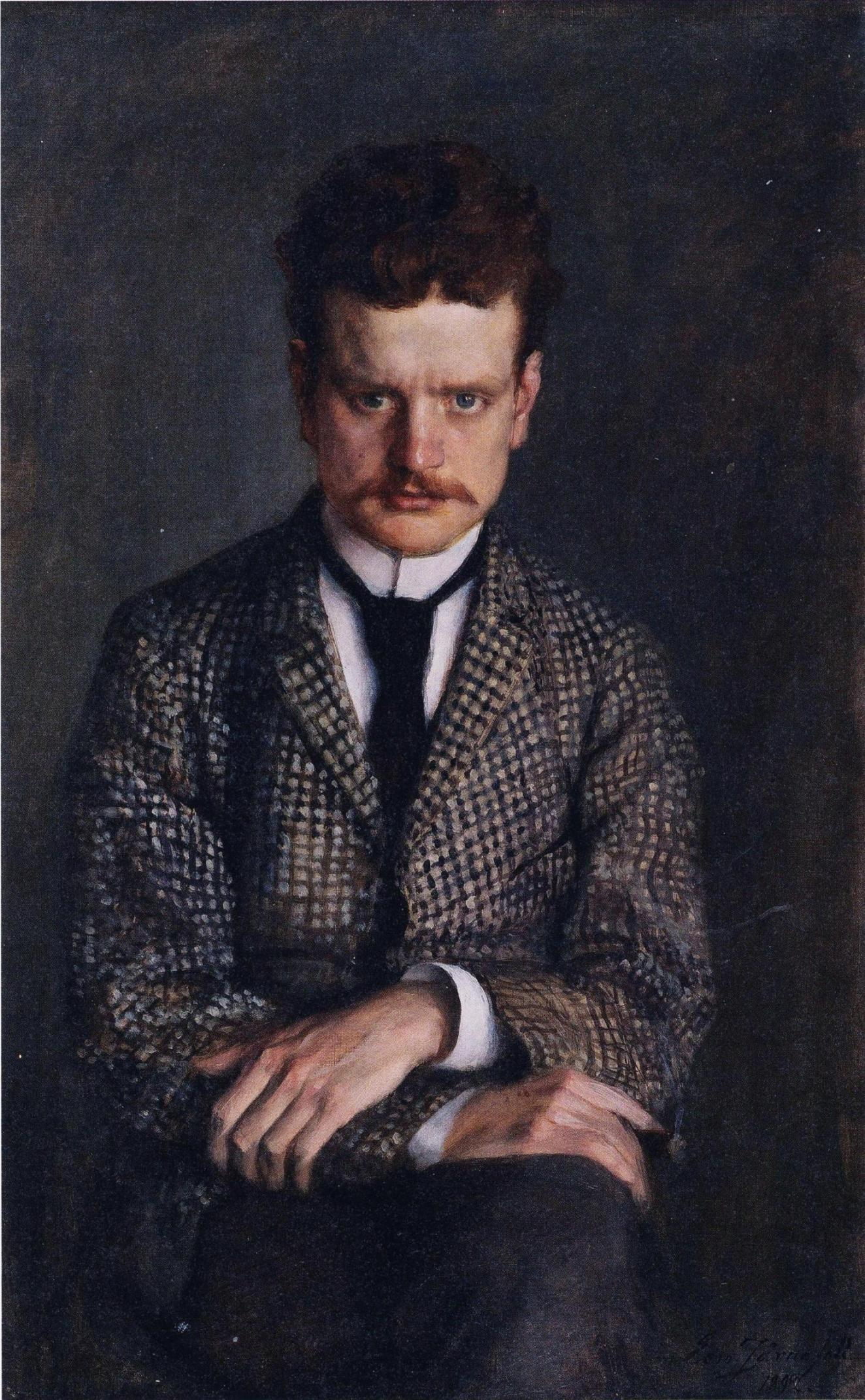
Jean Sibelius, 1892

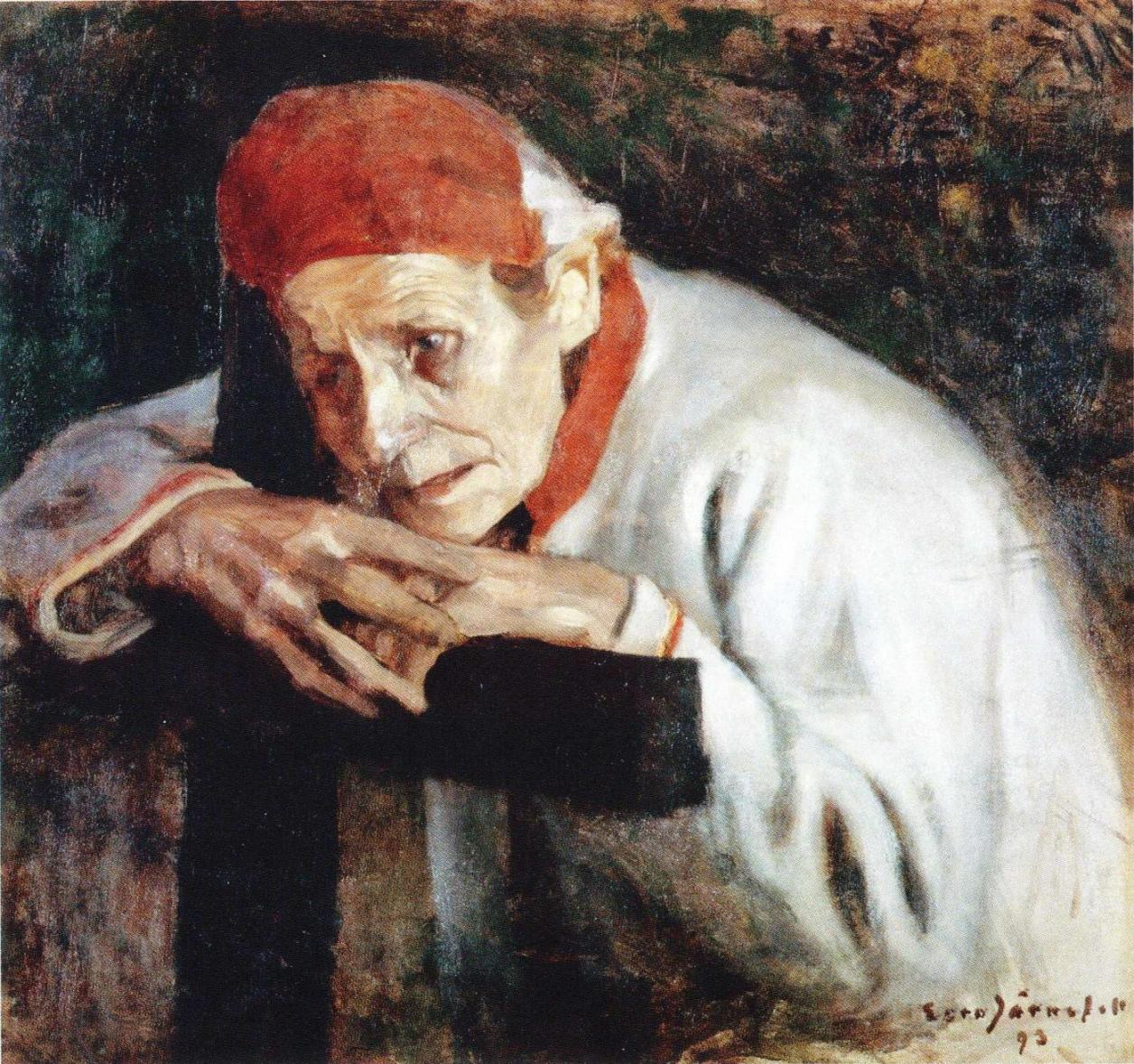
Larin Paraske, 1893

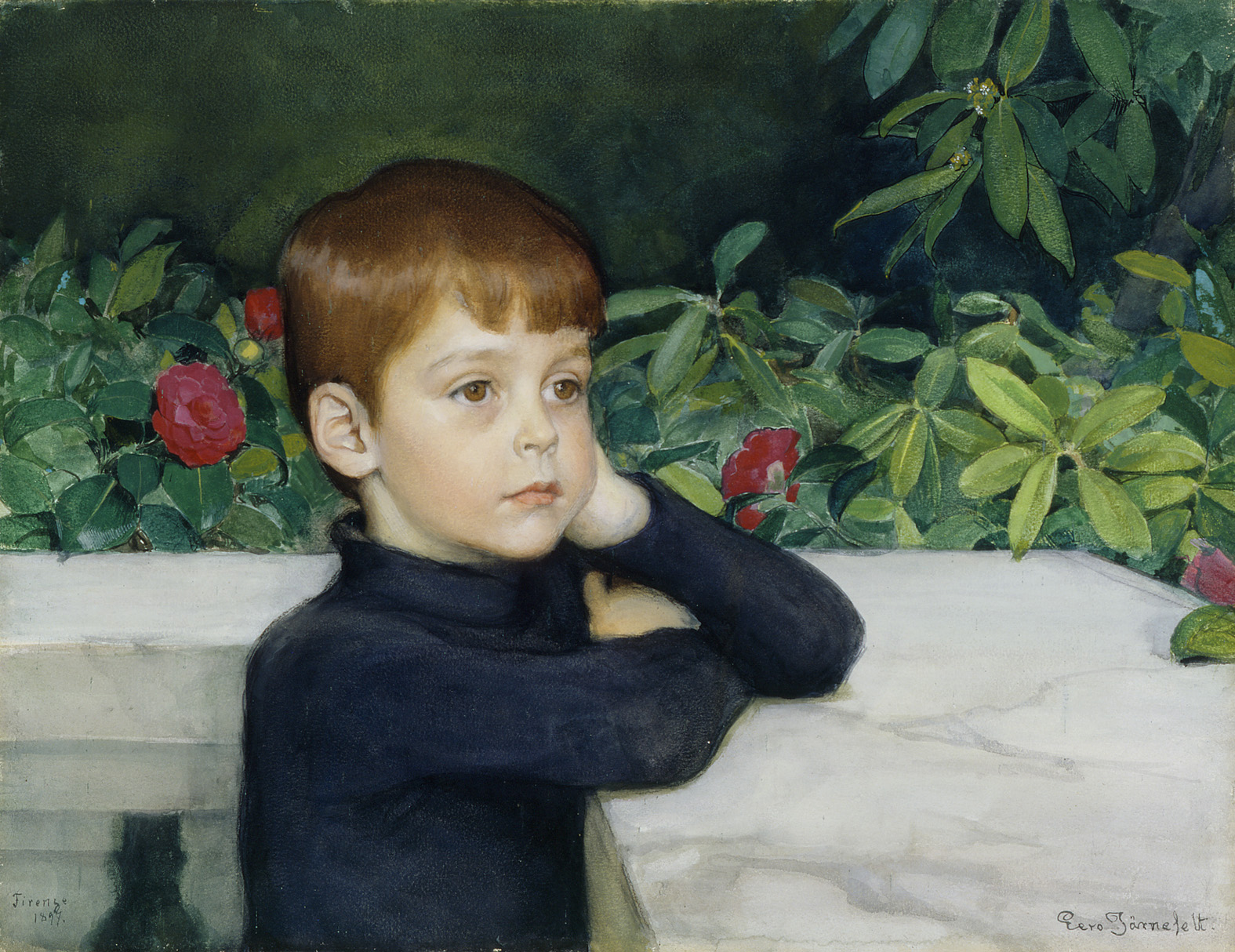
Portrait of the Artist's Son, 1897
(Heikki Järnefelt (1891–1963))

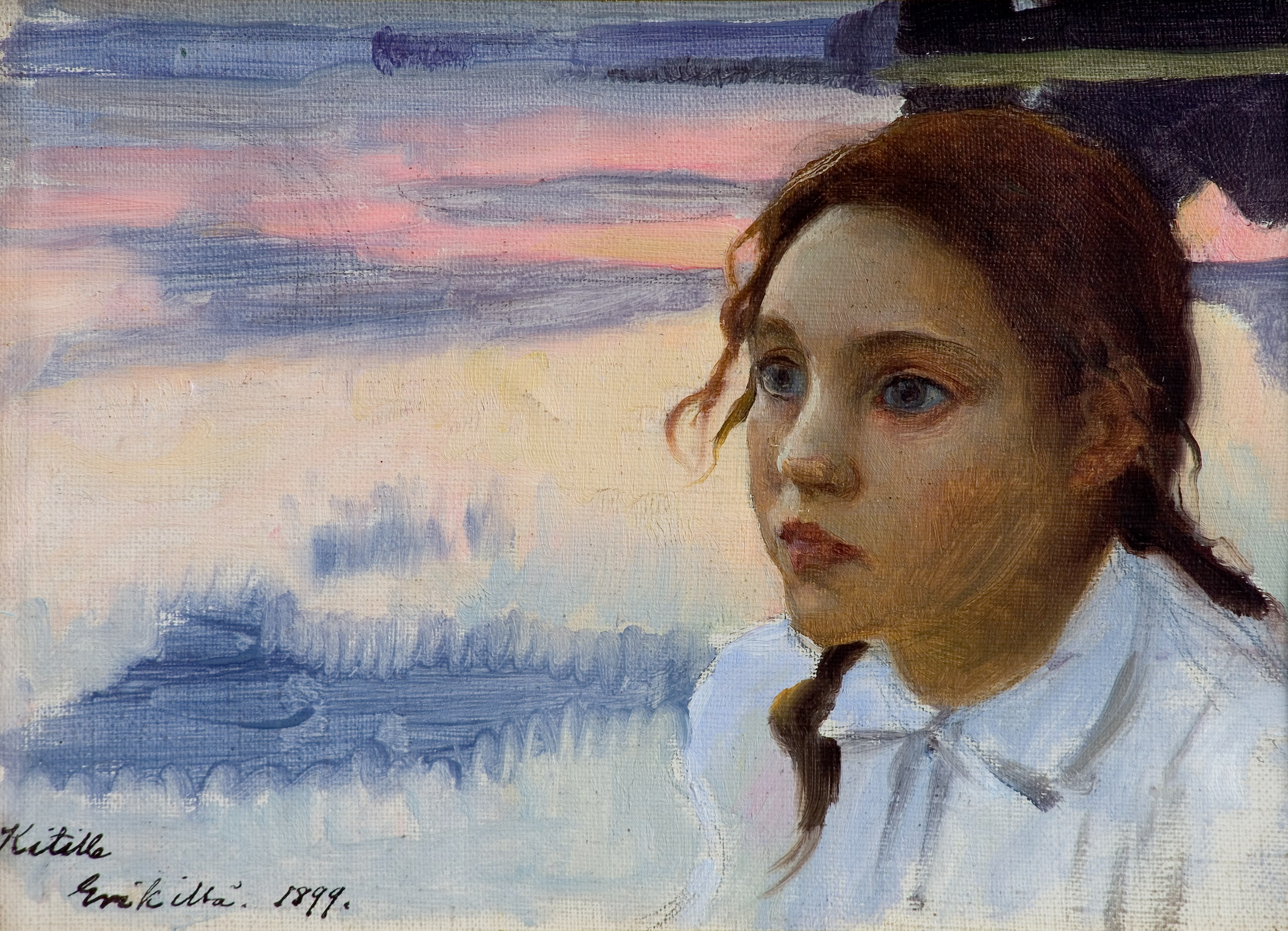
Nelma, 1899
(Nelma Sibelius)

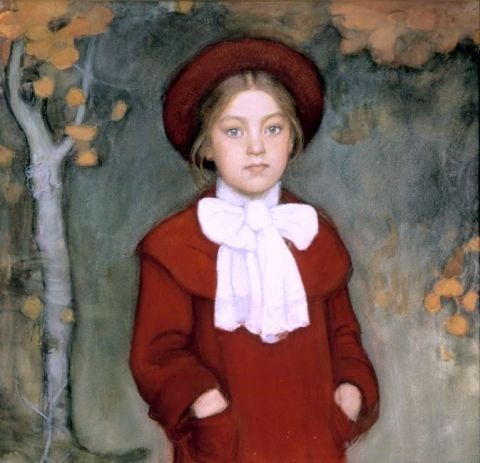
Leena, 1903
(Leena Järnefelt (1897–1991))

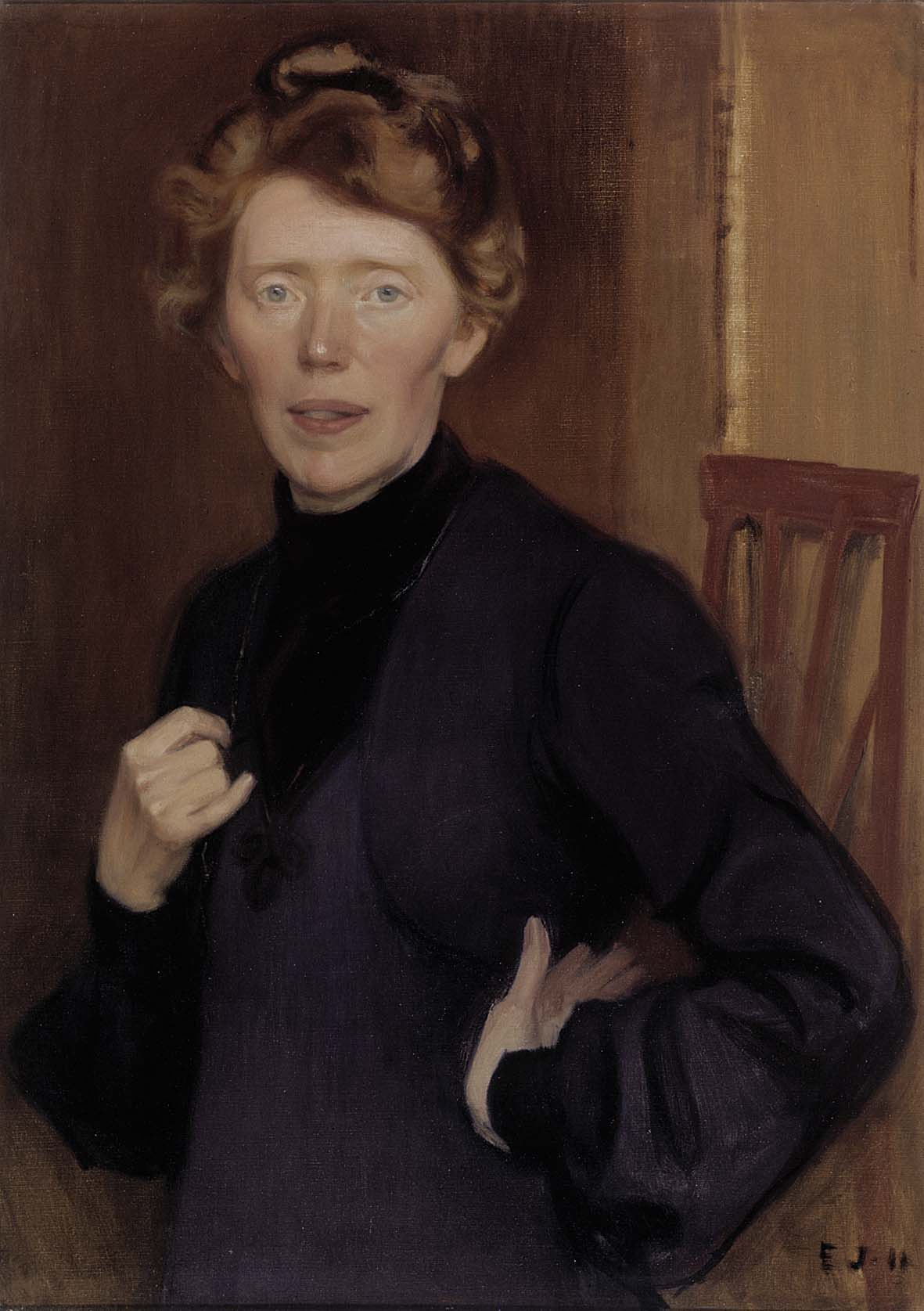
Tekla Hultin, 1905

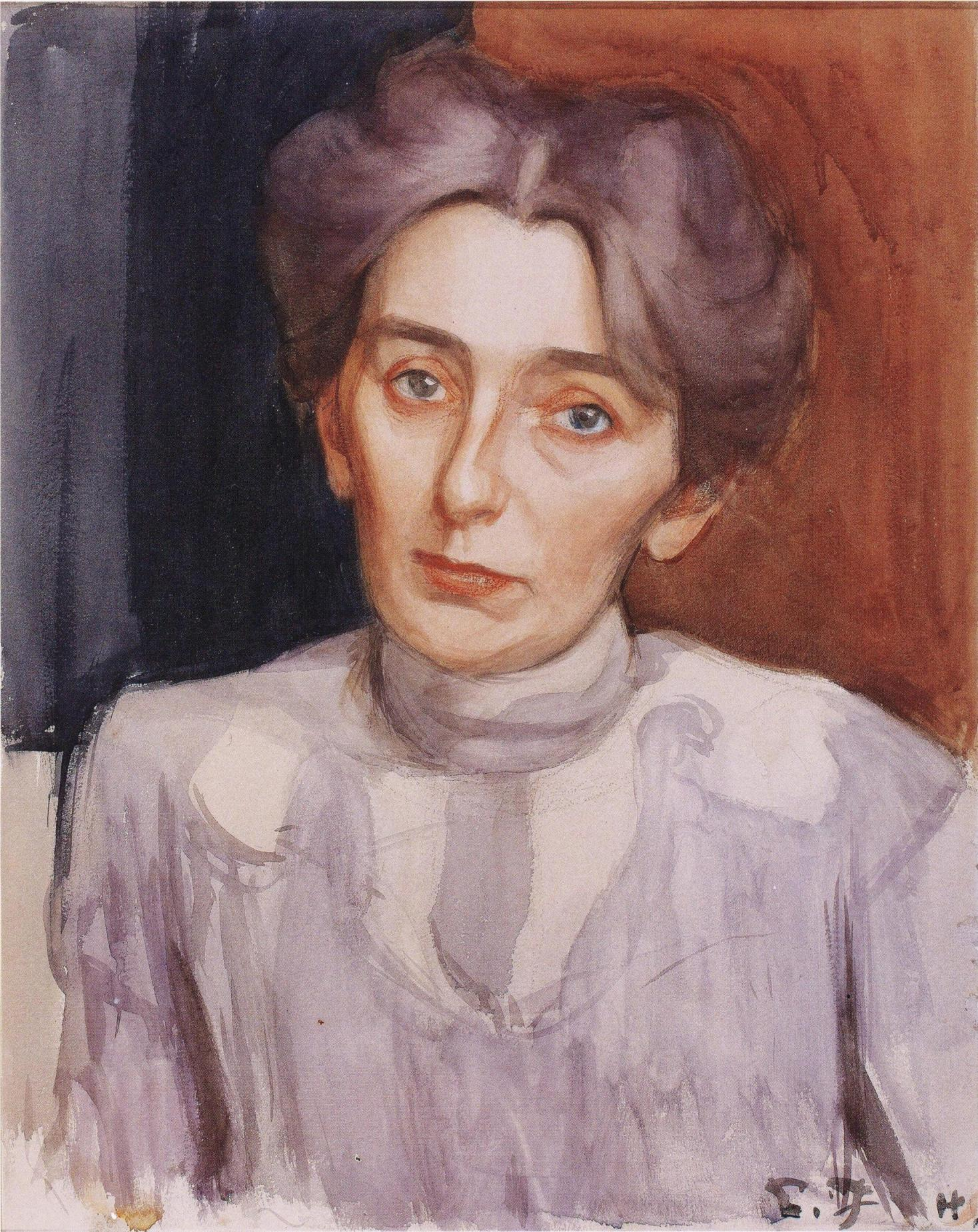
Aino Sibelius, 1908

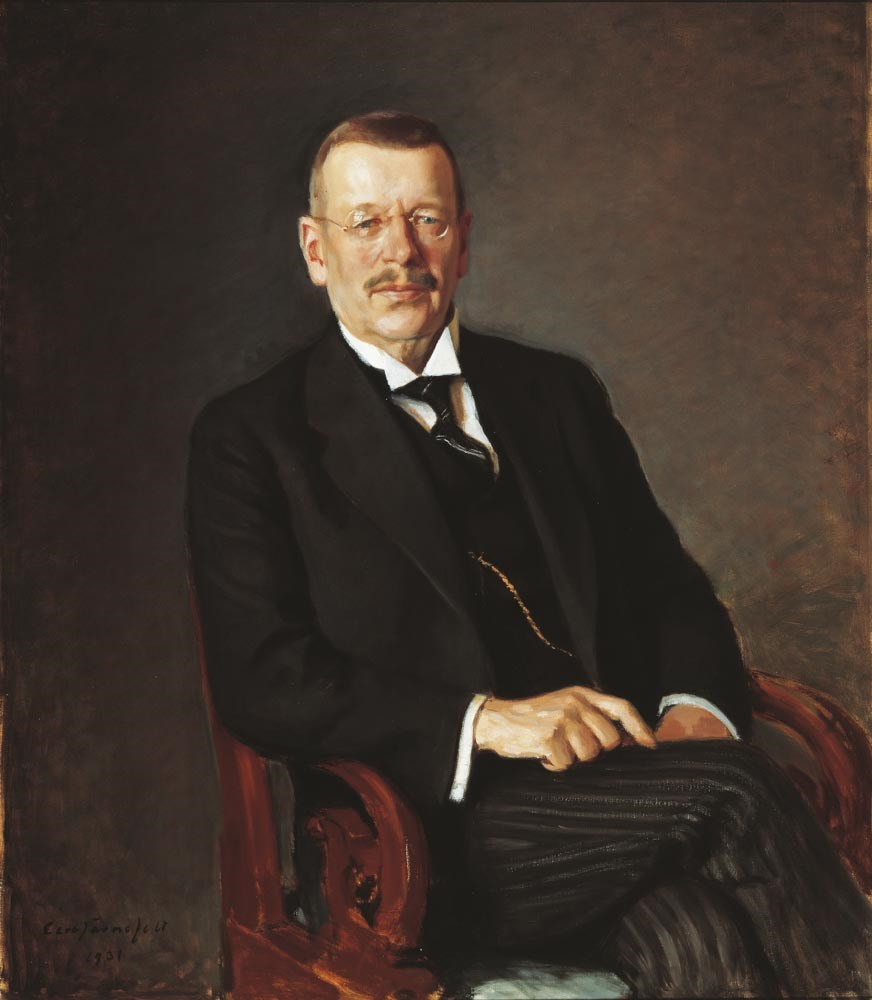
Juho Kusti Paasikivi, 1931

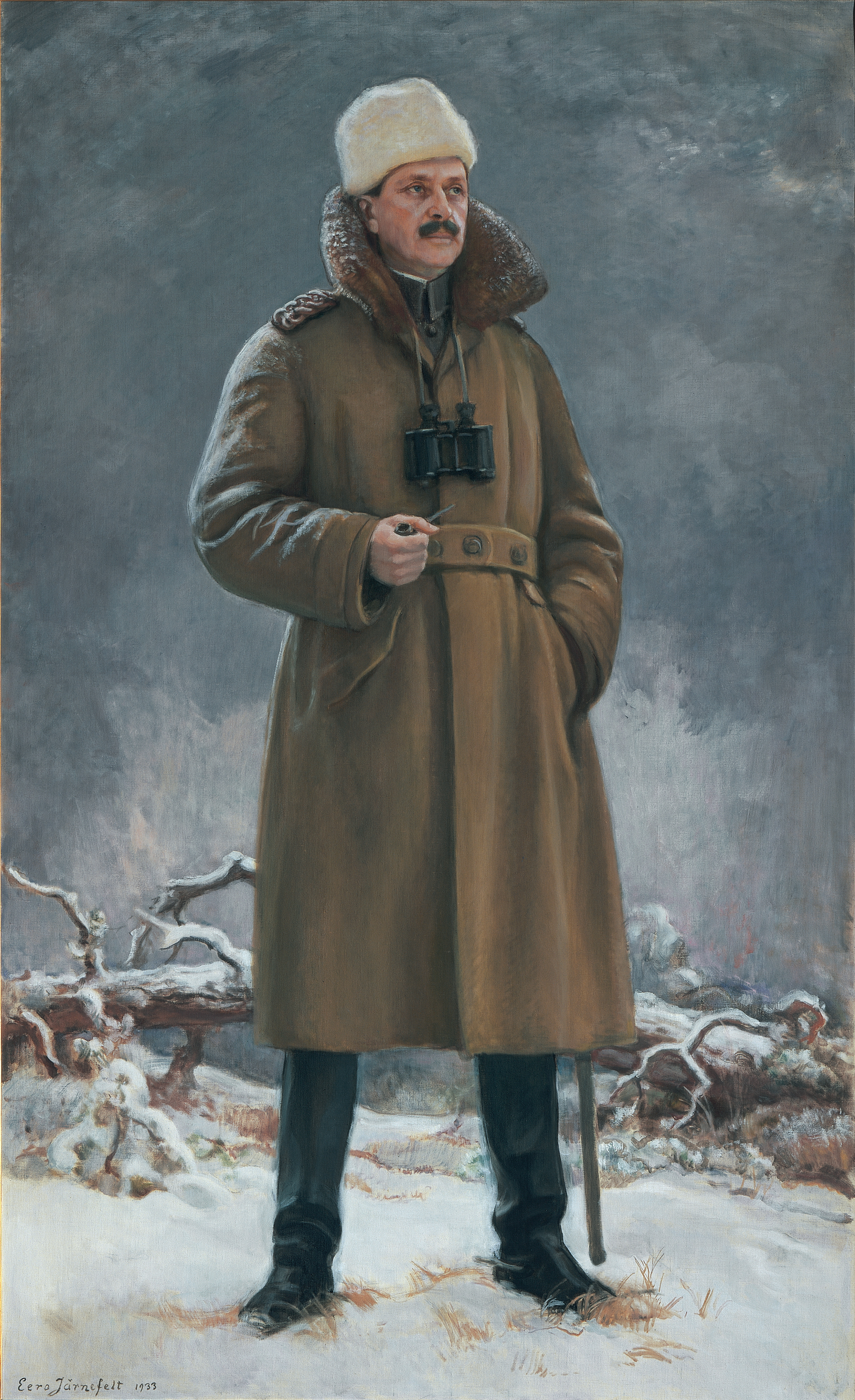
Carl Gustaf Emil Mannerheim 1933

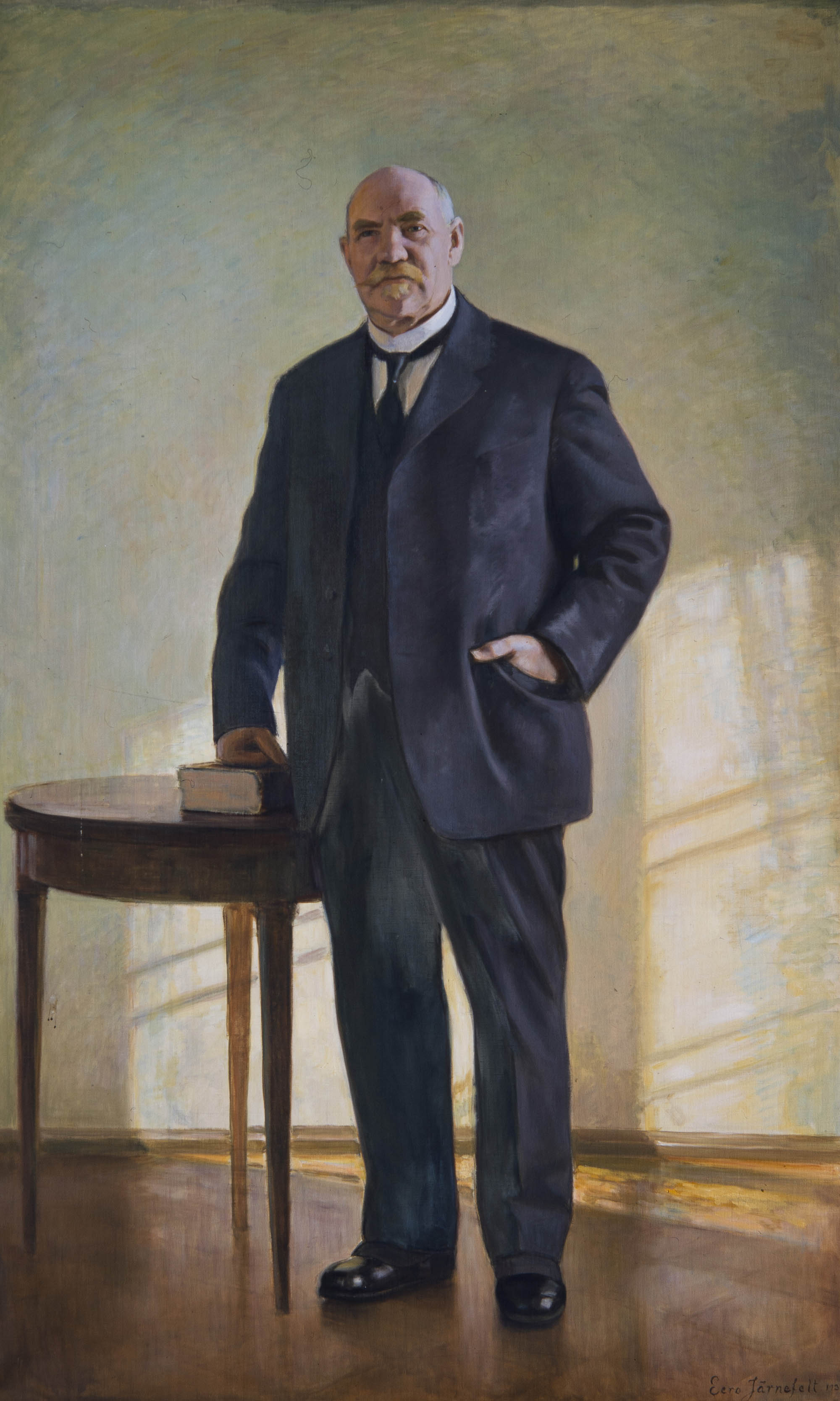
Pehr Evind Svinhufvud, 1933

== See also ==
- Golden Age of Finnish Art
