= Naisten Ääni =

Feminist magazine in Finland (1905–1948)

- Editor-in-chief: Maikki Friberg
- Categories: Feminist magazine; Women's magazine
- Founded: 1905
- Final issue: 1949
- Country: Finland
- Based in: Helsinki
- Language: Finnish

Naisten Ääni (Finnish: Women's Voice) was a feminist magazine which was published between 1905 and 1949 in Helsinki, Finland. It was started by the Naisasialiitto Unioni (Finnish: Feminist Association Union) and became affiliated with the Suomalainen naisliitto from 1907.

== History and profile ==
Naisten Ääni was established by the Naisasialiitto Unioni in 1905. The magazine ended its connection with the Naisasialiitto Unioni in 1907 and became an official organ of the Suomalainen naisliitto. The latter had members from Swedish- and Finnish-speaking groups in Finland.

Maikki Friberg was instrumental in the foundation of Naisten Ääni and served as its editor-in-chief until her death in 1927. The magazine attempted to enlighten women about various topics such as women's right to vote. It mostly featured political articles on women's education, their employment and emancipation and the mini-biographies of women and obituaries. Some of the articles were written by women. The magazine sold 10,000 copies in 1917.

Naisten Ääni folded in 1949. Its issues were archived by the National Library of Finland.
