= Hilja Vilkemaa =

Finnish educator, writer and politician (1887–1976)

Hilja Elina Vilkemaa (24 December 1887 – 8 December 1976; surname until 1914 Vilkman) was a Finnish educator, writer and politician, born in Turku. She was a member of the Parliament of Finland from 1920 to 1922, representing the National Progressive Party. She was a member of the Helsinki city council from 1951 to 1964, representing the Liberal League.
