= Tekla Hultin =

Finnish politician and journalist

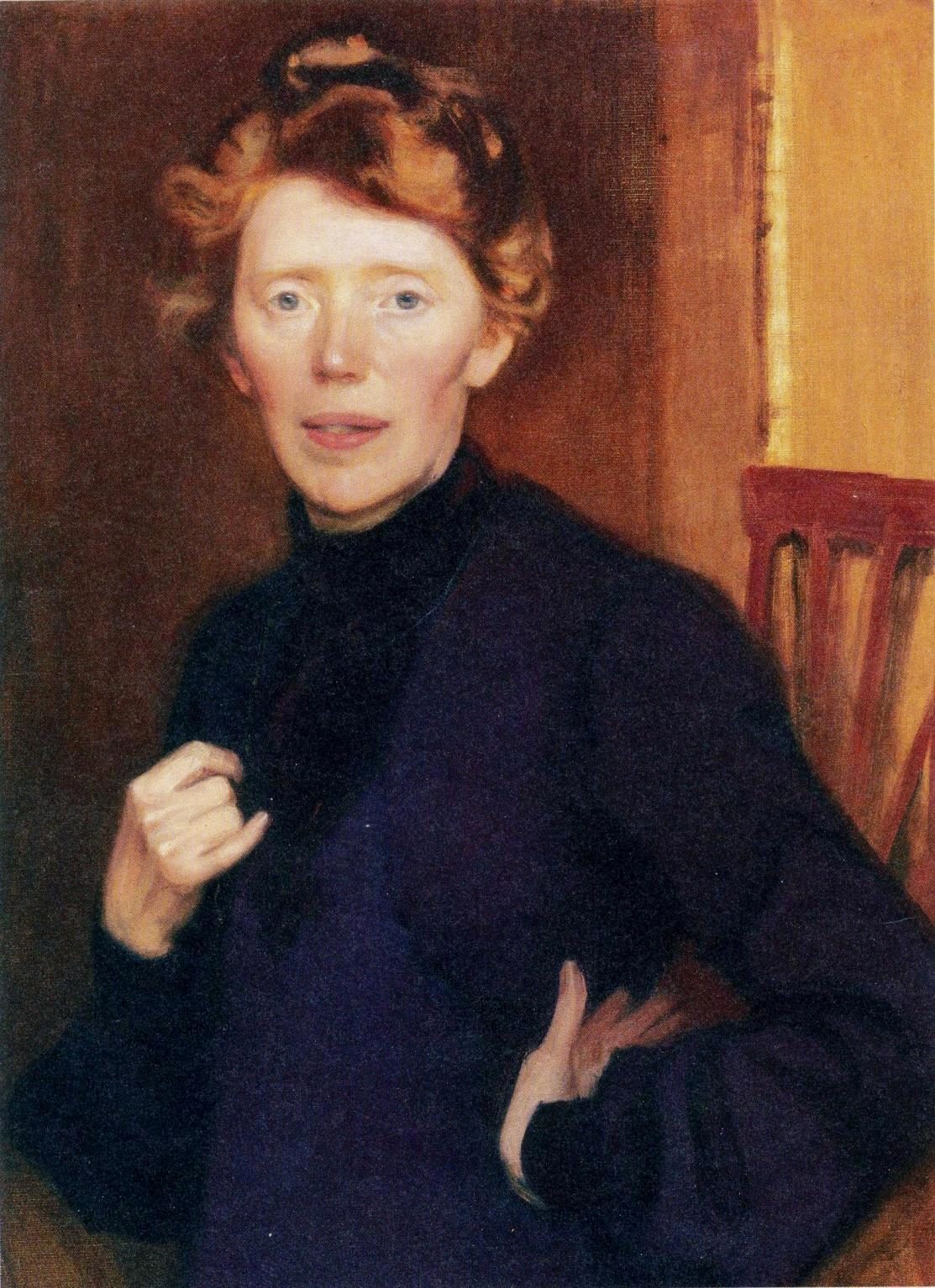

Member of the Finnish Parliament for Western Electoral District of Viipuri Province
- In office 1908–1924

Member of the Helsinki City Council
- In office 1925–1930

Personal details
- Born: April 18, 1864 Jaakkima, Grand Duchy of Finland (modern-day Russia)
- Died: March 31, 1943 (aged 78) Helsinki, Finland
- Party: Young Finnish Party; National Coalition Party
- Occupation: Journalist, politician

Thekla (Tekla) Johanna Virginia Hultin (18 April 1864 – 31 March 1943) was a Finnish journalist, politician and feminist. She was the first woman in Finland to be awarded a Ph.D. She was a journalist at Päivälehti, the newspaper of the Young Finnish Party, founded the Women's Kagal resistance organisation during the Russification of Finland, and played a central role in securing women's suffrage in 1906. She served as a Member of Parliament from 1908 to 1924.

== Biography ==
Tekla Hultin was born in Jaakkima (modern-day Russia) to a family of five children. She attended school in Sortavala and later a private girls school in Viipuri. She studied in Helsinki and became a teacher in 1885.

In 1886, Hultin began her university studies. She studied literature, art history and psychology, but specialised in history. In spring 1894, she received her Master's degree and became a journalist with the Helsinki newspaper Dagbladet.

In 1896, Hultin defended her doctoral thesis on the history of the mining industry in Finland during the Swedish era, becoming the first woman in Finland to receive a Ph.D. She then focused her efforts on political action. She published books for Suomalaisuuden herätys and wrote the biography of Leo Mechelin. In 1901, Hultin was appointed second actuary at Statistics Finland.

In her journal, Hultin described historical events of the era and the general feeling of the Finnish public on the events. The victory of the Japanese over the Russians in the Russo-Japanese War laid the foundation for protests, riots and the 1905 general strike in Finland against Russian occupation.

== Political life ==
Hultin was a journalist for Päivälehti, the newspaper of the Young Finnish Party (1893–1901). After six years at the paper she took on the editorship of Isänmaan Ystävä, which was shut down by Governor-General Nikolai Bobrikov in 1901; the closure brought her wider recognition as a committed patriot. As the first leader of the Finnish Women's Union, Hultin worked with Leo Mechelin to ensure Women's suffrage in Finland.

Following the February Manifesto of 1899, Hultin committed to passive resistance against Russification. In autumn 1901, the secret resistance council Kagal was established. The following year, the Women's Kagal was founded at Hultin's home — the first political organisation for women in Finland — which assisted Kagalen in distributing illegally printed publications and raising awareness of Finland's constitutional struggle abroad. The Women's Kagal continued its activities until 1944. For statements made abroad in defence of Finland's rights, Hultin was administratively suspended from her civil service position in 1912 and again in 1913.

Hultin worked closely with Leo Mechelin to secure women's suffrage. In late May 1906, the Diet resolved to replace the estate-based representation with universal and equal suffrage and eligibility for women. At the celebration of the decision, Mechelin stated that it was above all Hultin's efforts that had influenced those who decided on women's political rights — an acknowledgement that Hultin later considered the greatest recognition she had received.

Hultin served as a Member of Parliament for the Western Electoral District of Viipuri Province from 1908 to 1924. She originally represented the Young Finnish Party and around 1912 moved toward the political camp of Pehr Evind Svinhufvud, later joining the National Coalition Party when the Young Finnish Party dissolved. After her time in parliament, Hultin served on the Helsinki City Council from 1925 to 1930.

== Publications ==
=== Books ===
- Historiska upplysningar om bergshandteringen i Finland under svenska tiden. 1, Jernbruken (in Finnish). University of Helsinki. 1896. p. 247.
- Historiska upplysningar om bergshandteringen i Finland under svenska tiden. 2 (in Finnish). 1897.
- Leo Mechelin, en konturteckning (in Finnish). 1900.
- Mikä on perustuslaki?, vuoropuhelua lautamiehen tuvassa, Tekla Johanna Virginia Hultin; kirj. T. H. – Erkko Johan Henrik. 15 s., Otava, 1899.
- Mistä on kysymys?, 22 s., Nuorsuomalaisen puolueen kanslia, 1909.
- Naisasia Pienpainateaineisto, 1810–1944.
- Perustuslaillinen hallitus ja suomettarelainen hallitus, esitelmä pidetty nuorsuomalaisten kokouksissa syksyllä 1906, 24 s., 1906.
- Päiväkirjani kertoo (in Finnish). Vol. 1, 1899–1914. Kustannusoy, Sanatar. 1935. p. 507.
- Päiväkirjani kertoo (in Finnish). Vol. 2, 1914–1918. Sanatar. 1938. p. 400.
- Suomen asema Venäjän valtakunnassa. 19 s., WSOY, 1908 Suomalaisen naisliiton kirjasia; 3
- Taistelun mies, piirteitä Jonas Castrénin elämästä ja toiminnasta, muistojulkaisu (in Finnish). Otava. 1927. p. 181.
- Undersökning rörande nattarbeterskorna i Finlands industrier; på uppdrag af Kejserliga Senaten och under dess öfverinseende värkstäld. X, 85, 49 s. s., Edlundska Bokhandeln, 1911. Arbetsstatistik; XI
- Vielä kerran suomettarelainen hallitus, vastaus sen nimettömälle asianajajalle. 32., Nuorsuomalaisen puolueen kanslia, 1907.
- Yötyöntekijättäret Suomen teollisuudessa, tutkimus Keisarillisen Suomen Senaatin määräyksestä ja Teollisuushallituksen ylivalvonnan alaisena. X, 85, 49 s. 1911. Työtilastoa; 11

=== Translations ===
- Gustaf Alexander Cygnæus: K. Suomen talousseura 1797–1897, toimikunnan toimesta kuvailtu. Suomennoksen suoritti Tekla Hultin. 1897.
- Tekla Hultin, ed. (1892). Suomalaisuuden herätys, lausuntoja suomalaisuuden asiassa ennen Saima-lehden ilmestymistä (in Finnish). Otava.
- Suomen matkailija-yhdistys: Vuoksi, lyhyitä neuvoja Vuoksen-retkiä varten Imatralta Käkisalmeen ynnä kartta. Toim. Aug. Ramsay; suom. Tekla Hultin. Wasenius’en kirjakauppa, 1892.
- Ukko-Pekka, kansan mies, tammikuun 5 p:nä 1937. Toim. Erkki Räikkönen, E. A. Fabritius, Tekla Hultin. Sanatar, 1937.
- Pierre Paul Leroy-Beaulieu (1891). Yleisen kansantalouden pääpiirteet (in Finnish). Translated by Tekla Hultin. WSOY.
