= List of Finnish MPs imprisoned for political reasons =

This is a list of Finnish Members of Parliament who were imprisoned for political reasons.

== Grand Duchy of Finland ==
=== Imprisoned ===
Current and former MPs
MP	Party	MP period	Crime and punishment	Ref.
Matti Airola	Social Democratic Party	1908–1918	Imprisoned for lèse-majesté 1912	
Alex Halonen	Social Democratic Party	1910–1911	Imprisoned for lèse-majesté 1912–1913	
Frans Koskinen	Social Democratic Party	1907–1911	Imprisoned for lèse-majesté	
Vihtori Huhta	Social Democratic Party	1914–1917; 1941-1945	Imprisoned and deported to Siberia 1914	
Jalmari Kirjarinta	Social Democratic Party	1908-1910	Imprisoned for lèse-majesté 1911	
Kullervo Manner	Social Democratic Party	1910–1918	Imprisoned for lèse-majesté 1911	
Santeri Nuorteva	Social Democratic Party	1907–1908; 1909–1911	Imprisoned for lèse-majesté 1909	
J. H. Saaristo	Social Democratic Party	1908–1910	Exiled to Siberia 1915–1917	
Arthur Sivenius	Social Democratic Party	1907–1909; 1910–1911	Imprisoned for lèse-majesté 1910–1911	
P. E. Svinhufvud	Young Finnish Party (Note: Later National Coalition Party)	1907–1917; 1930–1931	Exiled to Siberia 1914–1917	
Taavi Tainio	Social Democratic Party	1907–1909; 1911–1914; 1922–1929	Imprisoned for mocking the sacrament 1909; Imprisoned for lèse-majesté 1913–1914	

Future MPs
MP	Party	MP period	Crime and punishment	Ref.
Pekka Ahmavaara	Young Finnish Party	1907–1917; 1917–1919	Exiled to Sweden 1903–1905	
Otto Åkesson	Swedish People's Party (Note: Later Agrarian League)	1917–1919; 1922–1924	Imprisoned for opposing equal rights for Russians 1913–1914	
Viktor Magnus von Born	Swedish People's Party	1910–1914	Exiled 1903–1904	
Jonas Castrén	Young Finnish Party	1907–1917	Exiled to Sweden 1903–1905	
Eero Erkko	Young Finnish Party (Note: Later National Progressive Party)	1907–1919	Exiled to the USA 1903–1905	
Ernst Estlander	Swedish People's Party	1907–1914; 1917–1945	Exiled to Novgorod 1904	
Erland Haapaniemi	Agrarian League	1948–1954	Exiled to Siberia 1916–1917	
Theodor Homén	Young Finnish Party	1908–1914; 1919–1922	Exiled to Novgorod 1904–1905	
Väinö Hupli	Social Democratic Party	1919–1922	Imprisoned for lèse-majesté 1910	
Akseli Kanerva	Social Democratic Party	1931–1933; 1933-1936	Imprisoned for lèse-majesté 1914	
Artturi Leinonen	Agrarian League	1936–1939; 1944–1945	Imprisoned for recruiting for the Jäger Movement 1916-1917	
Lauri Letonmäki	Social Democratic Party	1914–1917	Imprisoned for lèse-majesté 1912	
Ludvig Lindström	Social Democratic Party	1914–1917	Imprisoned for lèse-majesté 1909	
Leo Mechelin	Swedish People's Party	1910–1914	Exiled to Sweden 1903–1904	
Arvid Neovius	Swedish People's Party	1907–1917	Exiled to Sweden 1903–1905	
August Nybergh	Swedish People's Party	1910–1914	Exiled 1903–1904	
Otto Piisinen	Social Democratic Party	1914–1917	Imprisoned for lèse-majesté 1907–1908	
Mauno Rosendal	Young Finnish Party	1908–1909	Exiled to Sweden 1903–1905	
Emil Schybergson	Swedish People's Party	1907–1909; 1910–1919	Exiled to Novgorod 1904–1905	
Aarne Sihvo	National Progressive Party	1919–1920	Imprisoned for fighting for Germany in the 27th Jäger Battalion 1916-1917	
Eric von Troil	Swedish People's Party	1908–1917	Exiled 1900–1903	
Heikki Välisalmi	Social Democratic Party	1917–1918	Exiled to Siberia 1914–1917	
Väinö Vankkoja	Social Democratic Party	1918–1919	Imprisoned for lèse-majesté 1914–1915	
V. K. E. Wichmann	Swedish People's Party	1908–1909	Exiled to Sweden 1904–1906	
R. A. Wrede	Swedish People's Party	1910–1914; 1917–1919	Exiled to Russia 1904	

== Civil War ==
=== Executed ===
MP	Party	MP period	Crime and punishment	Ref.
Juho Hakkinen	Social Democratic Party	1917–1918	Imprisoned for political reasons 1918; executed by White Guards at Viipuri concentration camp 1918	
Samuli Häkkinen	Social Democratic Party	1907–1908; 1914–1918	Imprisoned for political reasons 1918; executed by White Guards at Viipuri concentration camp 1918	
Sofia Hjulgrén	Social Democratic Party	1914–1917	Imprisoned for political reasons 1918; executed by White Guards at Viipuri concentration camp 1918	
Leander Ikonen	Finnish Party	1917	Executed by Red Guards at Viipuri 1918	
Oskar Kaipio	Social Democratic Party	1908–1910	Imprisoned for political reasons 1918; executed by White Guards at Uusikirkko 1918	
Wilho Laine	Social Democratic Party	1907–1908; 1910–1914	Imprisoned for political reasons 1918; executed by White Guards at Hämeenlinna 1918	
Juho Lehmus	Social Democratic Party	1917–1918	Imprisoned for political reasons 1918; executed by White Guards at Tampere 1918	
Vilho Lehokas	Social Democratic Party	1917–1918	Executed by White Guards at Viipuri 1918	
Jussi Merinen	Social Democratic Party	1907–1908	Imprisoned for political reasons 1918; executed by White Guards at Tyrvää 1918	
Antti Mikkola	Young Finnish Party	1907–1908; 1909–1910; 1917–1918	Executed by Red Guards at Töölönlahti 1918	
Väinö Nyström	Finnish Party	1909–1910	Imprisoned for political reasons 1918; executed by Red Guards at Pirkkala 1918	
Matti Pietinen	Young Finnish Party	1910–1914	Imprisoned for political reasons 1918; executed by Red Guards at Viipuri Prison 1918	
Jussi Rainio	Social Democratic Party	1911–1914	Imprisoned for political reasons 1918; executed by White Guards at Pori 1918	
Juho Rikkonen	Social Democratic Party	1917–1918	Imprisoned for political reasons 1918; executed by White Guards at Viipuri concentration camp 1918	
Ernst Saari	Finnish Party	1914–1918	Executed by Red Guards at Tampere 1918	
Kalle Suosalo	Social Democratic Party	1917	Imprisoned for political reasons 1918; executed by White Guards at Pietarsaari 1918	
Juho Tulikoura	Agrarian League	1907–1917	Imprisoned for political reasons 1918; executed by Red Guards at Valkeala 1918	
Kalle Vänniä	Finnish Party	1914–1917	Imprisoned for political reasons 1918; executed by Red Guards at Tyrvää 1918	
August Vesa	Social Democratic Party	1908–1909	Imprisoned for political reasons 1918; executed by White Guards at Kotka 1918	

=== Died in captivity ===
MP	Party	MP period	Crime and punishment	Ref.
Evert Hokkanen	Social Democratic Party	1907–1910	Imprisoned for political reasons 1918; died in Hämeenlinna concentration camp 1918	
Frans Koskinen	Social Democratic Party	1907–1911	Imprisoned for political reasons 1918; died in Herrala concentration camp 1918	
Efraim Kronqvist	Social Democratic Party	1909–1914	Imprisoned for political reasons 1918; died in Riihimäki concentration camp 1918	
Jussi Kujala	Social Democratic Party	1914–1918	Imprisoned for political reasons 1918–1919; died in Sörnäinen punishment room 1919	
Jukka Lankila	Social Democratic Party	1917–1918	Imprisoned for political reasons 1918–1919; died in Sörnäinen punishment room 1919	
Taavetti Lapveteläinen	Social Democratic Party	1911–1918	Imprisoned for political reasons 1918–1919; died in Sörnäinen punishment room 1919	
Matti Lonkainen	Social Democratic Party	1909–1918	Imprisoned for political reasons 1918; died in captivity at Helsinki Surgical Hospital 1918	
Julius Nurminen	Social Democratic Party	1917–1918	Imprisoned for political reasons 1918; died in Tammisaari concentration camp 1918	
Juho Peura	Social Democratic Party	1914–1917	Imprisoned for political reasons 1918; died in Tampere concentration camp 1918	
Albert Raitanen	Social Democratic Party	1917–1918	Imprisoned for political reasons 1918; died in Hennala concentration camp 1918	
Eetu Salin	Social Democratic Party	1909–1910; 1917–1918	Imprisoned for political reasons 1918–1919; died in Helsinki punishment room 1919	
Oskari Suutala	Social Democratic Party	1917–1918	Imprisoned for political reasons 1918–1919; died in Sörnäinen punishment room 1919	
Albin Valjakka	Social Democratic Party	1907–1918	Imprisoned for political reasons 1918; died in Viipuri concentration camp 1918	

=== Imprisoned ===
Current and former MPs
MP	Party	MP period	Crime and punishment	Ref.
Ida Aalle-Teljo	Social Democratic Party	1907–1917	Imprisoned for political reasons 1919–1922	
Kustaa Ahmala	Social Democratic Party	1917–1918	Imprisoned for political reasons 1918–1922	
Valentin Annala	Social Democratic Party	1909–1918; 1924–1926	Imprisoned for political reasons 1918	
Werner Aro	Social Democratic Party	1908–1914	Imprisoned for political reasons 1918–1920	
Emanuel Aromaa	Social Democratic Party	1907–1918; 1924–1927; 1929–1933	Imprisoned for political reasons 1918–1920	
Nestori Aronen	Social Democratic Party	1909–1918	Imprisoned for political reasons 1918	
Oliver Eronen	Social Democratic Party	1907–1918; 1922–1924	Imprisoned for political reasons 1918	
Kalle Hakala	Social Democratic Party	1911–1918; 1924–1933; 1934–1947	Imprisoned for political reasons 1918	
Alex Halonen	Social Democratic Party	1910–1911	Imprisoned for political reasons 1919	
Aapo Harjula	Social Democratic Party	1917–1918	Imprisoned for political reasons 1918–1921	
Erkki Härmä	Social Democratic Party	1917–1918; 1948–1949	Imprisoned for political reasons 1918–1922	
Seth Heikkilä	Social Democratic Party	1907–1909; 1910–1918	Imprisoned for political reasons 1918	
Hilda Herrala	Social Democratic Party	1908–1914; 1917–1918; 1933–1936	Imprisoned for political reasons 1918–1919	
Tahvo Hiekkaranta	Social Democratic Party	1917	Imprisoned for political reasons 1918	
Matti Hoikka	Social Democratic Party	1907–1914; 1917–1918	Imprisoned for political reasons 1918	
Vihtori Huhta	Social Democratic Party	1914–1917; 1941-1945	Imprisoned for political reasons 1918	
Anni Huotari	Social Democratic Party	1907–1910; 1911–1918; 1922–1927; 1932–1943	Imprisoned for political reasons 1918–1921	
Anton Huotari	Social Democratic Party	1908–1910; 1911–1918	Imprisoned for political reasons 1918–1922	
Oskari Ikonen	Social Democratic Party	1914–1917	Imprisoned for political reasons 1918	
Oskari Jalava	Social Democratic Party	1907–1910; 1911–1918	Imprisoned for political reasons 1918–1923	
Mimmi Kanervo	Social Democratic Party	1907–1917	Imprisoned for political reasons 1918	
A. A. Kannisto	Social Democratic Party	1907–1911	Imprisoned for political reasons 1918–1921	
J. F. Kivikoski	Social Democratic Party	1910–1914	Imprisoned for political reasons 1918	
Ville Kiviniemi	Social Democratic Party	1917–1918	Imprisoned for political reasons 1918–1922	
Albin Koponen	Social Democratic Party	1907–1918; 1922–1944	Imprisoned for political reasons 1918–1919	
Jussi Kujala	Social Democratic Party	1914–1918	Imprisoned for political reasons 1918–1919	
Severi Kurkinen	Social Democratic Party	1910–1917	Imprisoned for political reasons 1918	
Oskari Fredrik Laine	Social Democratic Party	1907–1908	Imprisoned for political reasons 1918–1919	
Jaakko Latvala	Social Democratic Party	1911–1914; 1917–1918; 1922–1924; 1927–1929	Imprisoned for political reasons 1918	
Juho Lautasalo	Social Democratic Party	1908–1918	Imprisoned for political reasons 1918–1923	
Jukka Lehtosaari	Social Democratic Party	1917–1918	Imprisoned for political reasons 1921–1926	
Kalle Lepola	Social Democratic Party	1917–1918	Imprisoned for political reasons 1922–1926	
Paavo Leppänen	Social Democratic Party	1917–1918	Imprisoned for political reasons 1918	
Antti Mäkelin	Social Democratic Party	1907–1909; 1917–1918	Imprisoned for political reasons 1918–1921	
Yrjö Mäkelin	Social Democratic Party	1908–1911; 1914–1918	Imprisoned for political reasons 1918–1922	
Kaarle Mänty	Social Democratic Party (Note: Later Socialist Workers' Party of Finland)	1907–1908; 1910–1918	Imprisoned for political reasons 1918–1921	
Emil Murto	Social Democratic Party	1917–1918	Imprisoned for political reasons 1918	
Oskari Orasmaa	Social Democratic Party	1907–1911; 1914–1918	Imprisoned for political reasons 1918–1919	
Armas Paasonen	Social Democratic Party	1911–1918; 1924–1929; 1930–1933; 1936–1945	Imprisoned for political reasons 1918–1919	
Eemeli Paronen	Social Democratic Party	1914–1917; 1917–1919	Imprisoned for political reasons 1920s	
Hilja Pärssinen	Social Democratic Party	1907–1918; 1929–1935	Imprisoned for political reasons 1919–1923	
Otto Peitsalo	Social Democratic Party	1917	Imprisoned for political reasons 1918–1920	
Fiina Pietikäinen	Social Democratic Party	1908–1909	Imprisoned for political reasons 1918	
Jukka Pohjola	Social Democratic Party	1909–1914; 1917	Imprisoned for political reasons 1918	
Frans Rantanen	Social Democratic Party	1907–1909; 1910–1918	Imprisoned for political reasons 1918–1919	
Samuli Rantanen	Social Democratic Party	1907–1911; 1917	Imprisoned for political reasons 1918	
Kaarlo Saari	Social Democratic Party	1910–1918; 1924–1927	Imprisoned for political reasons 1918	
Santeri Saarikivi	Social Democratic Party	1908–1909; 1910–1911; 1917–1918	Imprisoned for political reasons 1918–1919	
Emil Saarinen	Social Democratic Party	1910–1918; 1922–1929	Imprisoned for political reasons 1918–1919	
J. H. Saaristo	Social Democratic Party	1908–1910	Imprisoned for political reasons 1918–1927	
Hulda Salmi	Social Democratic Party	1910–1918	Imprisoned for political reasons 1918–1921	
Aaro Salo	Social Democratic Party	1907–1914; 1917–1918	Imprisoned for political reasons 1918	
Anni Savolainen-Tapaninen	Social Democratic Party	1908–1918; 1924–1927	Imprisoned for political reasons 1918–1921	
Aatto Sirén	Social Democratic Party	1907–1914; 1917–1918; 1929–1930; 1933–1936	Imprisoned for political reasons 1921–1923	
Arthur Sivenius	Social Democratic Party	1907–1909; 1910–1911	Imprisoned for political reasons 1924–1925	
Julius Sundberg	Social Democratic Party	1917	Imprisoned for political reasons 1918	
Taavi Tainio	Social Democratic Party	1907–1909; 1911–1914; 1922–1929	Imprisoned for political reasons 1918	
Nestori Telkkä	Social Democratic Party	1908–1911	Imprisoned for political reasons 1918	
Jukka Tuomikoski	Social Democratic Party	1914–1917; 1917–1918	Imprisoned for political reasons 1918–1921	
O. V. Turunen	Social Democratic Party	1909–1917	Imprisoned for political reasons 1918	
Taneli Typpö	Social Democratic Party	1909–1918; 1922–1929	Imprisoned for political reasons 1918	
Ville Vainio	Social Democratic Party	1909–1911; 1919–1920; 1920–1923	Imprisoned for political reasons 1918	
Edvard Valpas	Social Democratic Party	1907–1918	Imprisoned for political reasons 1919–1924	
August Vatanen	Social Democratic Party	1914–1917	Imprisoned for political reasons 1918	
Sulo Wuolijoki	Social Democratic Party	1907–1914	Imprisoned for political reasons 1920s	

Future MPs
MP	Party	MP period	Crime and punishment	Ref.
Aleksander Allila	Socialist Electoral Organisation of Workers and Smallholders	1924–1927	Imprisoned for political reasons 1918	
Mikko Ampuja	Social Democratic Party	1919–1941; 1944–1945	Imprisoned for political reasons 1918	
Gunnar Andersson	Social Democratic Party	1933–1952	Imprisoned for political reasons 1918	
J. O. Aromaa	Social Democratic Party	1922–1924	Imprisoned for political reasons 1918	
Toivo Aronen	Socialist Workers' Party	1922–1923	Imprisoned for political reasons 1918–1919	
Tuomas Bryggari	Social Democratic Party	1922–1948	Imprisoned for political reasons 1918	
Yrjö Enne	Socialist Electoral Organisation of Workers and Smallholders (Note: Later Finnish People's Democratic League)	1927–1928; 1954–1962	Imprisoned for political reasons 1918	
Jaakko Enqvist	Socialist Workers' Party	1922–1923	Imprisoned for political reasons 1918	
Jussi Fahler	Social Democratic Party	1927–1929	Imprisoned for political reasons 1918–1919	
Vihtori Fallila	Social Democratic Party	1933	Imprisoned for political reasons 1918–1921	
Toivo Halonen	Social Democratic Party	1922–1945	Imprisoned for political reasons 1918	
Väinö Hannula	Socialist Workers' Party	1922–1923	Imprisoned for political reasons 1918	
Kaarlo Harvala	Social Democratic Party	1922–1939	Imprisoned for political reasons 1918	
Frans Hiilos	Socialist Workers' Party	1922–1923	Imprisoned for political reasons 1918–1920	
Edvard Huttunen	Socialist Electoral Organisation of Workers and Smallholders (Note: Later Social Democratic Party of Finland)	1924–1925; 1926–1933; 1937–1939	Imprisoned for political reasons 1918–1920	
Kalle Jokinen	Social Democratic Party	1936–1958	Imprisoned for political reasons 1918	
Yrjö Kallinen	Social Democratic Party	1945–1948	Imprisoned for political reasons 1918–1921	
Albert Kallio	Socialist Workers' Party	1922–1923	Imprisoned for political reasons 1918–1920	
Väinö Kallio	Socialist Electoral Organisation of Workers and Smallholders	1929–1930	Imprisoned for political reasons 1918	
Akseli Kanerva	Social Democratic Party	1931–1933; 1933-1936	Imprisoned for political reasons 1918–1920	
Kalle Kankari	Socialist Workers' Party	1922–1923	Imprisoned for political reasons 1918–1919	
O. H. Kekäläinen	Social Democratic Party	1939–1945	Imprisoned for political reasons 1918	
Väinö Kivisalo	Social Democratic Party	1929–1948	Imprisoned for political reasons 1918	
Janne Korhonen	Social Democratic Party	1922–1924	Imprisoned for political reasons 1918	
Juho Kosonen	Social Democratic Party	1930–1939; 1940–1945	Imprisoned for political reasons 1918–1919	
Juho Kuittinen	Social Democratic Party	1934–1956	Imprisoned for political reasons 1918	
Toivo Kujala	Finnish People's Democratic League	1945–1959	Imprisoned for political reasons 1918	
Jalmari Kulmala	Finnish People's Democratic League	1945–1948	Imprisoned for political reasons 1918	
Kalle Kulmala	Socialist Electoral Organisation of Workers and Smallholders	1924–1930	Imprisoned for political reasons 1918–1920	
Antti Lastu	Social Democratic Party	1933–1939; 1945	Imprisoned for political reasons 1918–1920	
Arvo Lehto	Socialist Electoral Organisation of Workers and Smallholders	1929–1930	Imprisoned for political reasons 1918–1925	
Toivo Lehto	Social Democratic Party	1922–1929	Imprisoned for political reasons 1918–1919	
Jalmari Leino	Social Democratic Party	1927–1930	Imprisoned for political reasons 1918	
Martti Leskinen	Finnish People's Democratic League	1948–1951; 1954–1958	Imprisoned for political reasons 1918–1919	
Paavo Leskinen	Finnish People's Democratic League	1945–1952	Imprisoned for political reasons 1918	
Jaakko Liedes	Socialist Electoral Organisation of Workers and Smallholders	1924–1930	Imprisoned for political reasons 1918	
Hemmi Lindqvist	Finnish People's Democratic League	1951–1958; 1962–1966	Imprisoned for political reasons 1918–1919	
Hjalmar Lindqvist	Social Democratic Party	1930–1933; 1937–1945	Imprisoned for political reasons 1918–1919	
Jussi Lonkainen	Social Democratic Party	1924–1927; 1933–1945	Imprisoned for political reasons 1918	
Kalle Myllymäki	Social Democratic Party	1922–1933	Imprisoned for political reasons 1918–1919	
Lauri Myllymäki	Socialist Electoral Organisation of Workers and Smallholders	1927–1930; 1954–1958	Imprisoned for political reasons 1918	
Antti Nahkala	Socialist Workers' Party	1922–1924	Imprisoned for political reasons 1918	
Niilo Pajunen	Social Democratic Party	1933–1936	Imprisoned for political reasons 1918	
Eino Pekkala	Socialist Electoral Organisation of Workers and Smallholders	1927–1930; 1945–1948	Imprisoned for political reasons 1918–1920	
Martti Peltonen	Social Democratic Party	1939–1945	Imprisoned for political reasons 1918	
Isak Penttala	Social Democratic Party	1927–1951	Imprisoned for political reasons 1918–1919	
Hjalmar J. Procopé	Swedish People's Party	1919–1922; 1924–1926	Imprisoned for buying weapons for the Whites 1918	
Juho Pyy	Social Democratic Party	1930–1933; 1935–1951	Imprisoned for political reasons 1918	
Jussi Raatikainen	Social Democratic Party	1936–1951	Imprisoned for political reasons 1918	
Pekka Railo	Social Democratic Party	1941–1944	Imprisoned for political reasons 1918	
Viljo Rantala	Social Democratic Party	1922–1962	Imprisoned for political reasons 1918–1921	
Janne Räsänen	Socialist Electoral Organisation of Workers and Smallholders	1924–1927	Imprisoned for political reasons 1918–1919	
Ville Riihinen	Finnish People's Democratic League	1945–1951	Imprisoned for political reasons 1918	
Wivi Roslander	Social Democratic Party	1922	Imprisoned for political reasons 1918	
Filemon Savenius	Socialist Electoral Organisation of Workers and Smallholders	1924–1929	Imprisoned for political reasons 1918	
Salomo Savolainen	Socialist Electoral Organisation of Workers and Smallholders	1927–1929	Imprisoned for political reasons 1918–1921	
Emil Tabell	Socialist Electoral Organisation of Workers and Smallholders	1924–1930	Imprisoned for political reasons 1918	
Konsta Talvio	Socialist Electoral Organisation of Workers and Smallholders	1929–1930; 1945–1948	Imprisoned for political reasons 1918–1920	
Kalle Toppinen	Socialist Workers' Party	1922–1924	Imprisoned for political reasons 1918	
Arvo Tuominen	Social Democratic Party	1958–1962	Imprisoned for political reasons 1918	
Aukusti Turunen	Socialist Electoral Organisation of Workers and Smallholders	1927–1930; 1948	Imprisoned for political reasons 1918	
August Valta	Social Democratic Party	1927–1933; 1941–1944	Imprisoned for political reasons 1918	
K. E. Varho	Socialist Electoral Organisation of Workers and Smallholders	1926–1927	Imprisoned for political reasons 1918	
Ida Vihuri	Social Democratic Party	1922–1929	Imprisoned for political reasons 1918–1920	
Jalmari Virta	Socialist Electoral Organisation of Workers and Smallholders	1924–1930	Imprisoned for political reasons 1918	

== Inter-war period ==
=== Died in captivity ===
MP	Party	MP period	Crime and punishment	Ref.
Yrjö Mäkelin	Social Democratic Party	1908–1911; 1914–1918	Imprisoned for political reasons 1923; died in prison in 1923	

=== Imprisoned ===
Current and former MPs
MP	Party	MP period	Crime and punishment	Ref.
Elin Airamo	Socialist Workers' Party	1922–1923	Imprisoned for political reasons 1923–1926	
Aleksander Allila	Socialist Electoral Organisation of Workers and Smallholders	1924–1927	Imprisoned for political reasons 1926	
Toivo Aronen	Socialist Workers' Party	1922–1923	Imprisoned for political reasons 1923–1928	
Yrjö Enne	Socialist Electoral Organisation of Workers and Smallholders	1927–1928; 1954–1962	Imprisoned for political reasons 1928	
Jaakko Enqvist	Socialist Workers' Party	1922–1923	Imprisoned for political reasons 1923	
Ida Hämäläinen	Socialist Electoral Organisation of Workers and Smallholders	1927–1929	Imprisoned for political reasons 1930–1932	
Väinö Hannula	Socialist Workers' Party	1922–1923; 1941–1944	Imprisoned for political reasons 1923	
Laura Härmä	Socialist Workers' Party	1922–1923	Imprisoned for political reasons 1923	
Frans Hiilos	Socialist Workers' Party	1922–1923	Imprisoned for political reasons 1923–1926	
Vihtori Huhta	Social Democratic Party	1914–1917; 1941-1945	Imprisoned for political reasons 1926, 1930s	
Oskari Ikonen	Social Democratic Party	1914–1917	Imprisoned for political reasons 1924	
Oskari Jalava	Social Democratic Party	1907–1910; 1911–1918	Imprisoned for political reasons 1920s	
Antti Kaarne	Christian Workers' Union	1908–1911; 1922–1923	Imprisoned for political reasons 1923	
Väinö Kallio	Socialist Electoral Organisation of Workers and Smallholders	1929–1930	Imprisoned for political reasons 1930–1932	
Kalle Kankari	Socialist Workers' Party	1922–1923	Imprisoned for political reasons 1923, 1930s	
Pekka Kemppi	Socialist Workers' Party	1922–1923	Imprisoned for political reasons 1920s	
Aukusti Koivisto	Socialist Workers' Party	1922–1923	Imprisoned for political reasons 1923	
Kalle Lampinen	Socialist Workers' Party	1922–1923	Imprisoned for political reasons 1923	
Toivo Långström	Socialist Workers' Party	1922–1923	Imprisoned for political reasons 1923–1926, 1930–1934	
Toivo Latva	Socialist Electoral Organisation of Workers and Smallholders	1927–1928	Imprisoned for political reasons 1928–1931	
Sandra Lehtinen	Social Democratic Party	1907–1910	Imprisoned for political reasons 1929–1932	
Yrjö Lehtinen	Socialist Electoral Organisation of Workers and Smallholders	1927–1929	Imprisoned for political reasons 1930s	
Jaakko Liedes	Socialist Electoral Organisation of Workers and Smallholders	1924–1930	Imprisoned for political reasons 1930–1933	
Emmi Mäkelin	Socialist Workers' Party	1922–1923	Imprisoned for political reasons 1923	
Kaarle Mänty	Social Democratic Party	1907–1908; 1910–1918	Imprisoned for political reasons 1923–1927	
Lauri Myllymäki	Socialist Electoral Organisation of Workers and Smallholders	1927–1930; 1954–1958	Imprisoned for political reasons 1930–1934	
Antti Nahkala	Socialist Workers' Party	1922–1924	Imprisoned for political reasons 1923–1928	
Eino Pekkala	Socialist Electoral Organisation of Workers and Smallholders	1927–1930; 1945–1948	Imprisoned for political reasons 1930	
Hannes Pulkkinen	Socialist Workers' Party	1922–1924	Imprisoned for political reasons 1924–1925	
Arvo Riihimäki	Socialist Electoral Organisation of Workers and Smallholders	1927–1930; 1945–1954	Imprisoned for political reasons 1930–1932	
Jalmari Rötkö	Socialist Electoral Organisation of Workers and Smallholders	1929–1930	Imprisoned for political reasons 1930	
August Rytkönen	Socialist Workers' Party	1922–1923	Imprisoned for political reasons 1923	
Rosa Sillanpää	Socialist Workers' Party	1922–1923	Imprisoned for political reasons 1923–1926	
Pekka Strengell	Socialist Electoral Organisation of Workers and Smallholders	1924–1927; 1928–1930	Imprisoned for political reasons 1930–1932	
Julius Sundblom	Swedish People's Party	1907–1919	Imprisoned for treason 1920	
Konsta Talvio	Socialist Electoral Organisation of Workers and Smallholders	1929–1930; 1945–1948	Imprisoned for political reasons 1930–1933	
Bruno Tenhunen	Socialist Electoral Organisation of Workers and Smallholders	1924	Imprisoned for political reasons 1924–1926	
Kalle Toppinen	Socialist Workers' Party	1922–1924	Imprisoned for political reasons 1923	
Lempi Tuomi	Socialist Workers' Party	1922–1923	Imprisoned for political reasons 1923–1924	
Matti Turkia	Social Democratic Party	1907–1909; 1914–1917; 1930–1945	Imprisoned for political reasons 1927–1928	
Aukusti Turunen	Socialist Electoral Organisation of Workers and Smallholders	1927–1930; 1948	Imprisoned for political reasons 1930–1933	
Vihtori Vainio	Socialist Workers' Party	1923	Imprisoned for political reasons 1923	
Ville Vainio	Social Democratic Party	1909–1911; 1919–1920; 1920–1923	Imprisoned for political reasons 1921–1922; 1923–1925	
Heikki Väisänen	Social Democratic Party (Note: Later Socialist Electoral Organisation of Workers and Smallholders)	1917; 1919; 1929–1930	Imprisoned for political reasons 1930	
Matti Väisänen	Socialist Workers' Party	1922	Imprisoned for political reasons 1923	
Yrjö Valkama	Socialist Workers' Party	1922–1923	Imprisoned for political reasons 1923	
K. E. Varho	Socialist Electoral Organisation of Workers and Smallholders	1926–1927	Imprisoned for political reasons 1930–1932	
Juho Vesterlund	Socialist Workers' Party	1922–1923	Imprisoned for political reasons 1923	
Konsta Vuokila	Socialist Electoral Organisation of Workers and Smallholders	1924	Imprisoned for political reasons 1924–1927	

Future MPs
MP	Party	MP period	Crime and punishment	Ref.
Aimo Aaltonen	Finnish People's Democratic League	1945–1962	Imprisoned for political reasons 1933–1944	
Toivo Friman	Finnish People's Democratic League	1948–1962; 1966–1970	Imprisoned for political reasons 1932–1934	
Esa Hietanen	Finnish People's Democratic League	1945–1962	Imprisoned for political reasons 1926–1927, 1930–1934	
Matti Huhta	Finnish People's Democratic League	1945–1948	Imprisoned for political reasons 1937–1944	
Juho Hukari	Finnish People's Democratic League	1945–1948	Imprisoned for political reasons 1931–1933	
Mikko Järvinen	Finnish People's Democratic League	1945–1953	Imprisoned for political reasons 1930s	
Toivo Järvinen	Finnish People's Democratic League	1945–1947	Imprisoned for political reasons 1930–1933	
Lauri Kantola	Finnish People's Democratic League	1962–1975	Imprisoned for political reasons 1929–1933	
Elsa Karppinen	Finnish People's Democratic League	1945–1948	Imprisoned for political reasons 1922, 1927–1930, 1931–1935	
Kalle Kauhanen	Finnish People's Democratic League	1945–1951; 1954–1958	Imprisoned for political reasons 1931–1934	
Toivo Kujala	Finnish People's Democratic League	1945–1959	Imprisoned for political reasons 1931	
Eino Kujanpää	Finnish People's Democratic League	1945–1951	Imprisoned for political reasons 1937–1940	
Jalmari Kulmala	Finnish People's Democratic League	1945–1948	Imprisoned for political reasons 1931–1933	
Hertta Kuusinen	Finnish People's Democratic League	1945–1972	Imprisoned for political reasons 1934–1939	
Eemeli Lakkala	Finnish People's Democratic League	1958–1962	Imprisoned for political reasons 1930–1932	
Toivo Lång	Finnish People's Democratic League	1945–1948	Imprisoned for political reasons 1929–1931, 1934–1936	
Yrjö Leino	Finnish People's Democratic League	1945–1951	Imprisoned for political reasons 1935–1938	
Martti Leskinen	Finnish People's Democratic League	1948–1951; 1954–1958	Imprisoned for political reasons 1930–1932	
Paavo Leskinen	Finnish People's Democratic League	1945–1952	Imprisoned for political reasons for 11 years	
Hemmi Lindqvist	Finnish People's Democratic League	1951–1958; 1962–1966	Imprisoned for political reasons 1927–1928, 1930–1934	
Yrjö Murto	Finnish People's Democratic League	1948–1963	Imprisoned for political reasons 1934–1944	
Janne Mustonen	Finnish People's Democratic League	1945–1962; 1963–1964	Imprisoned for political reasons 1926–1932	
Heikki Niskanen	People's Party (Note: Later Party of Smallholders and Rural People, Agrarian League)	1933–1945	Imprisoned for the 1933 Nivala revolt 1933–1934	
Nestori Nurminen	Finnish People's Democratic League	1945–1962; 1966–1970	Imprisoned for political reasons 1932–1937	
Juho Nykänen	Finnish People's Democratic League	1951–1954	Imprisoned for political reasons 1932–1935	
Ville Pessi	Finnish People's Democratic League	1945–1966	Imprisoned for political reasons 1935–1944	
Antto Prunnila	Finnish People's Democratic League	1945–1954; 1958–1962	Imprisoned for political reasons 1931–1933	
Ville Puumalainen	Finnish People's Democratic League	1945–1954	Imprisoned for political reasons 1931–1932	
Eino Rannikkoluoto	Finnish People's Democratic League	1952–1954	Imprisoned for political reasons 1930–1934	
Kalle Renfors	Finnish People's Democratic League	1948–1954	Imprisoned for political reasons 1930s	
Ville Riihinen	Finnish People's Democratic League	1945–1951	Imprisoned for political reasons 1925–1928, 1930–1934	
Eino Roine	Finnish People's Democratic League	1945–1951; 1954–1962; 1962–1966	Imprisoned for political reasons 1930–1933	
Mauritz Rosenberg	Socialist Electoral Organisation of Workers and Smallholders	1924–1930	Imprisoned for political reasons 1922–1924, 1930–1933	
Ilmari Sormunen	Finnish People's Democratic League	1945–1951	Imprisoned for political reasons 1930–1934, 1937–1939	
Elli Stenberg	Finnish People's Democratic League	1945–1966	Imprisoned for political reasons 1930–1936	
Leo Suonpää	Finnish People's Democratic League	1954–1970	Imprisoned for political reasons 1934–1936	
Paavo Susitaival	Patriotic People's Movement	1939–1940	Imprisoned for political reasons four times 1930s	
Eino Tainio	Finnish People's Democratic League	1945–1970	Imprisoned for political reasons 1929–1932, 1933–1938	
Olga Terho	Finnish People's Democratic League	1945–1948	Imprisoned for political reasons 1932–1933, 1936–1940	
Arvo Tuominen	Social Democratic Party	1958–1962	Imprisoned for political reasons 1922–1926; 1928–1933	
Tyyne Tuominen	Finnish People's Democratic League	1945–1948; 1958–1962	Imprisoned for political reasons 1938–1940	
Reino Uusisalmi	Finnish People's Democratic League	1945	Imprisoned for political reasons 1930–1931	
Aaro Uusitalo	Finnish People's Democratic League	1945–1948	Imprisoned for political reasons 1931–1935	

== Winter War and Continuation War ==
=== Imprisoned ===
Current and former MPs
MP	Party	MP period	Crime and punishment	Ref.
Mikko Ampuja	Social Democratic Party	1919–1941; 1944–1945	Imprisoned for political reasons 1941–1944	
Johan Helo	Social Democratic Party	1919–1922; 1924–1935; 1945–1946	Imprisoned for political reasons 1941–1944	
T. M. Kivimäki	National Progressive Party	1922; 1924–1927; 1929–1940	Imprisoned for war crimes 1946–1948	
Antti Kukkonen	Agrarian League	1919–1945; 1954–1962	Imprisoned for war crimes 1946–1947	
Toivo Långström	Socialist Workers' Party	1922–1923	Imprisoned for political reasons 1941–1944	
Edwin Linkomies	National Coalition Party	1933–1945	Imprisoned for war crimes 1946–1948	
Väinö Meltti	Socialist Group	1941; 1944–1945	Imprisoned for political reasons 1941–1944	
Lauri Myllymäki	Socialist Electoral Organisation of Workers and Smallholders	1927–1930; 1954–1958	Imprisoned for political reasons 1941–1944	
Yrjö Räisänen	Social Democratic Party (Note: Later Socialist Group, Finnish People's Democratic League)	1930–1941; 1944–1948	Imprisoned for political reasons 1941–1944	
Tyko Reinikka	Agrarian League	1922–1930	Imprisoned for war crimes 1946–1947	
Kaisu-Mirjami Rydberg	Social Democratic Party	1939–1941; 1944–1948	Imprisoned for political reasons 1941–1944	
Mauri Ryömä	Social Democratic Party	1936–1937; 1945–1958	Imprisoned for political reasons 1940–1944	
Risto Ryti	National Progressive Party	1919–1924; 1927–1929	Imprisoned for war crimes 1946–1949	
Cay Sundström	Social Democratic Party	1936–1941; 1944–1945	Imprisoned for political reasons 1941–1944	
Väinö Tanner	Social Democratic Party	1907–1911; 1914–1917; 1919–1927; 1930–1945; 1951–1954; 1958–1962	Imprisoned for war crimes 1946–1948	
K. H. Wiik	Social Democratic Party	1911–1918; 1922–1929; 1933–1941; 1944–1946	Imprisoned for political reasons 1941–1944	

Future MPs
MP	Party	MP period	Crime and punishment	Ref.
Aimo Aaltonen	Finnish People's Democratic League	1945–1962	Imprisoned for political reasons 1933–1944	
Toivo Åsvik	Finnish People's Democratic League	1954–1966; 1970–1975	Imprisoned for political reasons 1941–1944	
Georg Backlund	Finnish People's Democratic League	1953–1954; 1958–1970	Imprisoned for political reasons 1939–1944	
Toivo Friman	Finnish People's Democratic League	1948–1962; 1966–1970	Imprisoned for political reasons 1939–1944	
Esa Hietanen	Finnish People's Democratic League	1945–1962	Imprisoned for political reasons 1939–1940	
Matti Huhta	Finnish People's Democratic League	1945–1948	Imprisoned for political reasons 1937–1944	
Juho Hukari	Finnish People's Democratic League	1945–1948	Imprisoned for political reasons 1940–1944	
Lauri Kantola	Finnish People's Democratic League	1962–1975	Imprisoned for political reasons 1941–1944	
Elsa Karppinen	Finnish People's Democratic League	1945–1948	Imprisoned for political reasons 1939–1944	
Toivo Kujala	Finnish People's Democratic League	1945–1959	Imprisoned for political reasons 1940s	
Eino Kujanpää	Finnish People's Democratic League	1945–1951	Imprisoned for political reasons 1937–1940, 1941–1944	
Jalmari Kulmala	Finnish People's Democratic League	1945–1948	Imprisoned for political reasons 1939–1944	
Hertta Kuusinen	Finnish People's Democratic League	1945–1972	Imprisoned for political reasons 1941–1944	
Eemeli Lakkala	Finnish People's Democratic League	1958–1962	Imprisoned for political reasons 1939–1940, 1941–1944	
Toivo Lång	Finnish People's Democratic League	1945–1948	Imprisoned for political reasons 1939–1940, 1940–1944	
Yrjö Leino	Finnish People's Democratic League	1945–1951	Imprisoned for political reasons 1940–1941	
Hemmi Lindqvist	Finnish People's Democratic League	1951–1958; 1962–1966	Imprisoned for political reasons 1939–1944	
Juho Mäkelä	Finnish People's Democratic League	1945–1948; 1958–1966	Imprisoned for political reasons 1940–1944	
Yrjö Murto	Finnish People's Democratic League	1948–1963	Imprisoned for political reasons 1934–1944	
Janne Mustonen	Finnish People's Democratic League	1945–1962; 1963–1964	Imprisoned for political reasons 1941–1943	
Sulo Muuri	Finnish People's Democratic League	1945–1948	Imprisoned for political reasons 1939–1940, 1941–1944	
Toivo Niiranen	Finnish People's Democratic League	1962–1966	Imprisoned for political reasons 1944	
Nestori Nurminen	Finnish People's Democratic League	1945–1962; 1966–1970	Imprisoned for political reasons 1940–1944	
Juho Nykänen	Finnish People's Democratic League	1951–1954	Imprisoned for political reasons 1939–1940	
Ville Pessi	Finnish People's Democratic League	1945–1966	Imprisoned for political reasons 1935–1944	
Antto Prunnila	Finnish People's Democratic League	1945–1954; 1958–1962	Imprisoned for political reasons 1941–1944	
Eino Rannikkoluoto	Finnish People's Democratic League	1952–1954	Imprisoned for political reasons 1939–1940, 1941–1944	
Pertti Rapio	Finnish People's Democratic League	1951–1966	Imprisoned for political reasons 1941–1944	
Ville Riihinen	Finnish People's Democratic League	1945–1951	Imprisoned for political reasons 1939–1940	
Eino Roine	Finnish People's Democratic League	1945–1951; 1954–1962; 1962–1966	Imprisoned for political reasons 1941–1944	
Gösta Rosenberg	Finnish People's Democratic League	1945–1966	Imprisoned for espionage 1939–1940	
Elli Stenberg	Finnish People's Democratic League	1945–1966	Imprisoned for political reasons 1939–1944	
Eino Tainio	Finnish People's Democratic League	1945–1970	Imprisoned for political reasons 1939–1940, 1940–1944	
Hannes Tauriainen	Finnish People's Democratic League	1948–1966	Imprisoned for political reasons 1939–1944	
Olga Terho	Finnish People's Democratic League	1945–1948	Imprisoned for political reasons 1936–1940, 1941–1944	
Tyyne Tuominen	Finnish People's Democratic League	1945–1948; 1958–1962	Imprisoned for political reasons 1938–1940, 1941–1944	
Reino Uusisalmi	Finnish People's Democratic League	1945	Imprisoned for political reasons 1940–1944	
Aaro Uusitalo	Finnish People's Democratic League	1945–1948	Imprisoned for political reasons 1941–1944	
Antti Virtanen	Finnish People's Democratic League	1946–1948	Imprisoned for political reasons 1941–1944	
Hella Wuolijoki	Finnish People's Democratic League	1946–1948	Imprisoned for espionage 1942–1944	

== Soviet Union ==
=== Executed ===
MP	Party	MP period	Crime and punishment	Ref.
Aino Forsten	Social Democratic Party	1917–1918	Imprisoned 1937; executed at Petroskoi 1937	
Edvard Gylling	Social Democratic Party	1908–1910; 1911–1918	Imprisoned 1937–1938; executed 1938	
Herman Hurmevaara	Social Democratic Party	1917–1919	Imprisoned 1937–1938; executed at Petroskoi 1938	
Oskari Ikonen	Social Democratic Party	1914–1917	Imprisoned 1938; executed at Petroskoi 1938	
Väinö Kallio	Socialist Electoral Organisation of Workers and Smallholders	1929–1930	Imprisoned 1938; executed at Petroskoi 1938	
Hanna Karhinen	Social Democratic Party	1914–1917	Imprisoned 1938; executed at Aunus 1938	
Kalle Korhonen	Social Democratic Party	1917–1918	Imprisoned 1937–1938; executed at Karhumäki 1938	
Kalle Kyhälä	Socialist Electoral Organisation of Workers and Smallholders	1929–1930	Imprisoned 1938; executed near Petroskoi 1938	
Kalle Lepola	Social Democratic Party	1917–1918	Imprisoned 1937; executed 1937	
Maria Letonmäki	Social Democratic Party	1917	Imprisoned 1937; executed at Petroskoi 1937	
J. H. Lumivuokko	Social Democratic Party	1914–1917	Imprisoned 1938; executed at Petroskoi 1938	
Jaakko Mäki	Social Democratic Party	1908–1918	Imprisoned 1937–1938; executed at Petroskoi 1938	
Juho Perälä	Socialist Electoral Organisation of Workers and Smallholders	1928–1930	Imprisoned 1937–1938; executed at Karhumäki 1938	
Hannes Pulkkinen	Socialist Workers' Party	1922–1924	Imprisoned 1937–1938; executed at Karhumäki 1938	
Asser Salo	Socialist Electoral Organisation of Workers and Smallholders	1929–1930	Imprisoned 1937–1938; executed 1938	
Tyyne Salomaa	Social Democratic Party	1917	Imprisoned 1938; executed at Petroskoi 1938	
Emil Tabell	Socialist Electoral Organisation of Workers and Smallholders	1924–1930	Imprisoned 1937; executed 1937	
Kalle Toppinen	Socialist Workers' Party	1922–1924	Imprisoned 1937–1938; executed at Karhumäki 1938	
Arthur Usénius	Social Democratic Party	1917–1918	Imprisoned 1935–1937; executed at Leningrad 1937	
Jalmari Virta	Socialist Electoral Organisation of Workers and Smallholders	1924–1930	Imprisoned 1937–1938; executed at Karhumäki 1938	

=== Died in captivity ===
MP	Party	MP period	Crime and punishment	Ref.
Matti Airola	Social Democratic Party	1908–1918	Imprisoned 1938–1939; died in prison in Leningrad 1939	
Toivo Alavirta	Social Democratic Party	1917–1918	Imprisoned 1937–1940; died at a prison camp in Ust-Vym 1940	
Hanna Kohonen	Social Democratic Party	1917–1918	Imprisoned 1937–1944; died at a labour camp in Karaganda 1944	
Jukka Lehtosaari	Social Democratic Party	1917–1918	Imprisoned 1938–1939; died in prison in Molotov Oblast 1939	
Kullervo Manner	Social Democratic Party	1910–1918	Imprisoned 1935–1939; died at a labour camp in Siberia 1939	
Antti Nahkala	Socialist Workers' Party	1922–1924	Imprisoned 1938–1942; died at a camp in Uhto-Izhemsk, Siberia 1942	

=== Imprisoned ===
MP	Party	MP period	Crime and punishment	Ref.
Aleksander Allila	Socialist Electoral Organisation of Workers and Smallholders	1924–1927	Imprisoned 1933	
Feliks Kellosalmi	Social Democratic Party	1909–1911; 1917–1918	Imprisoned 1935–1936	
Jalo Kohonen	Social Democratic Party	1917–1918	Imprisoned 1935	
Toivo Latva	Socialist Electoral Organisation of Workers and Smallholders	1927–1928	Imprisoned 1937–1947	
J. K. Lehtinen	Social Democratic Party	1917	Imprisoned 1937	
Santeri Nuorteva	Social Democratic Party	1907–1908; 1909–1911	Imprisoned 1921–1922	
Pekka Nurmiranta	Socialist Workers' Party	1922–1924	Imprisoned 1941–	
Anni Rytkönen	Social Democratic Party	1919–1922	Imprisoned 1937–1938	
Siina Urpilainen	Socialist Electoral Organisation of Workers and Smallholders	1927–1930	Imprisoned at a camp in Karaganda 1938–1948	
William Tanner	Socialist Electoral Organisation of Workers and Smallholders	1927–1930	Imprisoned 1935–1940	

== Other countries ==
=== Imprisoned ===
MP	Party	MP period	Crime and punishment	Ref.
A. J. Partanen	Social Democratic Party	1907–1910	Imprisoned for political reasons in Oregon, USA 1918–1920	
William Tanner	Socialist Electoral Organisation of Workers and Smallholders	1927–1930	Imprisoned for espionage in the USA 1918–1922	
