= Ville Kiviniemi =

Finnish politician (1877–1951)

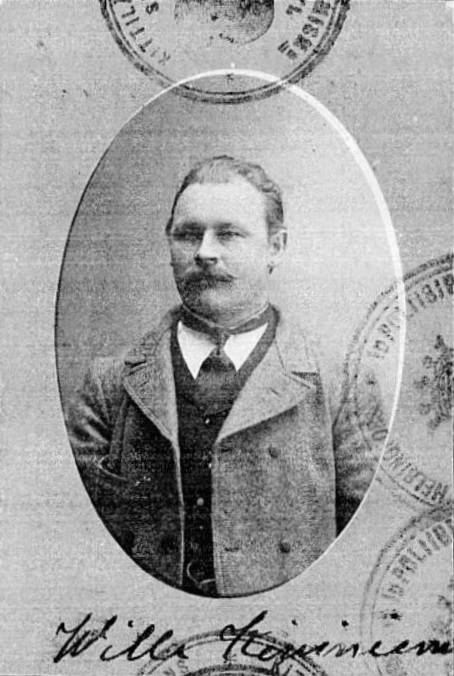
- Kiviniemi in 1918

Member of the Parliament of Finland
- In office 1 November 1917 – 25 September 1918
- Constituency: Lapland

Personal details
- Born: 17 March 1877 Kaukonen, Kittilä, Russian Empire
- Died: 21 June 1951 (aged 74) Kittilä, Finland
- Party: Socialist Electoral Organisation of Workers and Smallholders
- Occupation: Farmer

Vilhelm Kiviniemi (17 March 1877 – 21 June 1951) was a Finnish farmer, politician and member of the Parliament of Finland, the national legislature. A member of the Social Democratic Party, he represented Lapland between November 1917 and September 1918. He was amongst dozens of social democrat MPs who were persecuted for political reasons by the victorious Whites following end of the Finnish Civil War in 1918. Kiviniemi was sentenced to death for treason but this was later commuted to life imprisonment. He received a presidential pardon in 1922.

== Early life ==
Kiviniemi was born on 17 March 1877 in Kaukonen near Kittilä. He was the great-grandson of Kittilä's first priest, Juho Nordberg. The Kiviniemi family were farmers in Kittilä. He was educated at the Kirkonkylän koulun folk school in Kittilä.

== Politics and imprisonment ==
Kiviniemi took part in the 1905 Finnish general strike. He contested the 1908 parliamentary election as a SDP candidate in Lapland. He also contested the 1909, 1910 and 1911 parliamentary elections. He was elected to the Parliament of Finland at the 1917 parliamentary election.

Following the end of the Finnish Civil War, arrest warrants were issued for 50 social democrat MPs for treason. 36 of these MPs had left the country but four of them, including Kiviniemi, returned to Finland and were imprisoned. Prosecutors alleged that Kiviniemi had travelled from Helsinki to Kandalaksha in the Viena region of Karelia (White Karelia), via St. Petersburg and Petrozavodsk, on the orders of Red Guards leader August Wesley. They alleged that Wesley had given Kiviniemi Mk 20,000 to organise a Red Guard unit in Archangel and produced a receipt for the money purportedly signed by Kiviniemi. Kiviniemi and his supporteds claimed that Kiviniemi had only entered Russia in order to make his way home to Kittilä and that the receipt had been signed by another Ville Kiviniemi.

In October 1918 the State Criminal Court sentenced nine social democrat MPs (Nestori Aronen, Erkki Härmä, Kiviniemi, Jussi Kujala, Jukka Lankila, Juho Lautasalo, Paavo Leppänen, Yrjö Mäkelin and Eetu Salin) to death for treason. A petition signed by 118 members (87 socialists and 31 liberals) of the Swedish Riksdag was submitted to the Finnish Government requesting pardons for the nine MPs and others who had been sentenced to death. The court commuted Kiviniemi's death sentence to life imprisonment in January 1919. He was pardoned by President Kaarlo Juho Ståhlberg in January 1922. He was subsequently released from Tammisaari concentration camp.

== Later life ==
Kiviniemi contested the 1929 parliamentary election as a Socialist Electoral Organisation of Workers and Smallholders candidate in Lapland but came second behind Agrarian Party candidate Matti Hannula. He died on 21 June 1951 in Kittilä.

== See also ==
- List of MPs in Finland imprisoned for political reasons
