= Toivo =

- Gender: Male
- Name day: 4 June (both Estonia and Finland)

Origin
- Meaning: hope
- Region of origin: Estonia, Finland

Toivo is a masculine given name most commonly found in Estonia and Finland meaning hope. Alternately, it is a short form of the name Tobias.

It may refer to:

- Andimba Toivo ya Toivo (1924–2017), Namibian politician and anti-Apartheid activist
- Sigrid Elmblad (1860–1926), Swedish journalist, poet, translator and writer who wrote under the pseudonym Toivo
- Toivo Aalto-Setälä (1896–1977), Finnish politician
- Toivo Aare (1944–1999), Estonian journalist
- Toivo Alavirta (1890–1940), Finnish journalist and politician
- Toivo Antikainen (1898–1941), Finnish communist and military officer
- Toivo Aro (1887–1962), Finnish diver and Olympic competitor
- Toivo Aronen (1886–1973), Finnish politician
- Toivo Asmer (born 1947), Estonian racing driver, motorsports promoter, musician and politician
- Toivo Haapanen (1889–1950), conductor and music scholar
- Toivo Halonen (1893–1984), Finnish politician
- Toivo Harjunpää (1910–1995), Finnish-born American Lutheran priest and professor
- Toivo Horelli (1888–1975), Finnish politician
- Toivo Hörkkö (1898–1975), Finnish cyclist and Olympic competitor
- Toivo Hyytiäinen (1925–1978), Finnish athlete, javelin thrower and Olympic medalist
- Toivo Ikonen (1891–1976), Finnish politician
- Toivo Jaatinen (1926–2017), Finnish sculptor
- Toivo Jullinen (born 1963), Estonian politician
- Toivo Jürgenson (born 1957), Estonian engineer, entrepreneur and politician
- Toivo Kärki (1915–1992), Finnish composer, musician, music producer and arranger
- Toivo Kinnunen (1905–1977), Finnish politician
- Toivo Mikael Kivimäki (1886–1968), Finnish ambassador, professor, politician and former Prime Minister of Finland
- Toivo Koljonen (1912–1943), Finnish criminal, last Finn executed for a civilian crime
- Toivo Kujala (1894–1959), Finnish politician
- Toivo Kuula (1883–1918), Finnish conductor and composer
- Toivo Hjalmar Långström (1889–1983), Finnish politician and trade union activist
- Toivo Loukola (1902–1984), Finnish athlete, runner and Olympic medalist
- Toivo Maimets (born 1957), Estonian biologist and politician
- Toivo Mäkelä (1909–1979), Finnish film actor
- Toivo Ndjebela (born ????), Namibian journalist and newspaper editor
- Toivo Oikarinen (1924–2003), Finnish cross country skier and Olympic competitor
- Toivo Ovaska (1899–1966), Finnish speed skater and Olympic competitor
- Toivo Paloposki (1928–1991), Finnish archivist and historian
- Toivo Pawlo (1917–1979), Swedish film actor
- Toivo Pohjala (1888–1969), Finnish wrestler and Olympic competitor
- Ivo Reingoldt (1906–1941), Finnish swimmer and Olympic competitor
- Toivo Salonen (1933–2019), Finnish speed skater and Olympic medalist
- Toivo Särkkä (1890–1975), Finnish film producer and director
- Toivo Sukari (born 1954), Finnish businessman
- Toivo Suursoo (born 1975), Estonian ice hockey player
- Toivo Tikkanen (1888–1947), Finnish architect, sport shooter and Olympic medalist
- Toivo Tootsen (born 1943), Estonian journalist, writer and politician
- Toivo Uustalo (born 1946), Estonian politician
- Toivo Vähä (1901–1984), Finnish-born colonel of the KGB
- Toivo Vaikvee (born 1947), Danish-born New Zealand cricketer
