= Kiviniemi =

Kiviniemi may refer to:

- Kalevi Kiviniemi (1958–2024), Finnish concert organist
- Mari Kiviniemi (born 1968), Finnish politician and former Prime Minister of Finland
- Losevo, Leningrad Oblast
- Ville Kiviniemi (1877–1951), Finnish politician
