= Kauhanen =

Kauhanen is a Finnish surname. Notable people with the surname include:

- Aarne Kauhanen (1909–1949), Finnish police officer
- Kalle Kauhanen (1900–1969), Finnish bricklayer and politician
- Tuomas Kauhanen (born 1985), Finnish rapper
