= Tuomikoski =

Tuomikoski is a Finnish surname. Notable people with the surname include:

- Juho Tuomikoski (1888–1967), Finnish long-distance runner
- Jukka Tuomikoski (1884–1956), Finnish painter and politician
- Samuli Tuomikoski (1875–1960), Finnish farmer and politician
