= A. A. Kannisto =

Finnish politician (1876–1930)

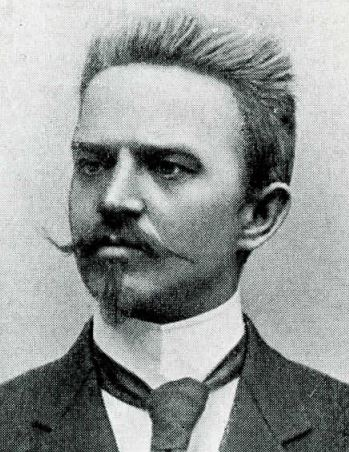
- Kannisto in 1908

Member of the Parliament of Finland
- In office 22 May 1907 – 31 January 1911
- Constituency: Mikkeli Province

Personal details
- Born: Anders Anshelm Käck; 6 March 1876 Joroinen, Russian Empire
- Died: 14 March 1930 (aged 54) Mikkeli, Finland
- Party: Social Democratic Party of Finland
- Occupation: Carpenter

Anders Anshelm Kannisto (6 March 1876 – 14 March 1930) was a Finnish trade unionist and politician who was a member of the Parliament of Finland from 1907 to 1911. A member of the Social Democratic Party, he represented Mikkeli Province. A member of the Red Guard, he was taken prisoner by the White Guard at the start of the Finnish Civil War in 1918. After the war Kannisto was sentenced to eight years in prison for treason, but was released in 1921.

== Early life ==
Kannisto was born on 6 March 1876 in Joroinen. He was the son of crofter Gustaf Johan Käck and Gustava Vilhelmina Brask. His father died when Kannisto was five years old and he was brought up by his mother. He was educated at folk school and folk high school. He worked as a gardener and a carpenter in Joroin and Sääminki until 1908. He was a janitor at the workers' association in Mikkeli from 1908 and then a manager. He married Maria Silvennoinen in 1902 and had two daughters. He changed his surname from Käck to Kannisto in May 1906.

== Trade unionism and politics ==
Kannisto became involved in the labour movement in his youth and joined the Social Democratic Party of Finland (SDP) at the age of 20 through the Kuopio Labor Association. He was one of the key figures in organising the 1905 Finnish general strike in Savonlinna. He worked as a distributor for the Vapaus. the SDP's newspaper in Mikkeli, when it was founded in 1906.

Kannisto was elected to the Parliament of Finland at the 1907 parliamentary election. He was re-elected at the 1908, 1909 and 1910 parliamentary elections.

Following the February Revolution of 1917, Kannisto was elected chairman of the food committee of Mikkeli Province in May 1917. He was a candidate in the 1917 parliamentary election.

== Civil war and imprisonment ==
In November 1917 a White Guard unit was formed in Mikkeli under the leadership of William Hjalmar Spåre and Hjalmar Nyberg. A Red Guard unit was also formed in the city at around the same time under the leadership of Kannisto and fellow former SDP MP Alex Halonen. By mid January 1918 both sides were armed. When the Finnish Civil War started in late January 1918, the two sides in Mikkeli took a "wait and see" approach but the White Guards destroyed various bridges in the area on 28 January 1918 to prevent Red Guard movement. The Red Guards set-up camp at Mikkeli's People's House and the water tower on Naisvuori while the White Guards were based at the lyceum. The White Guards besieged the water tower and on 29 January 1918 presented an ultimatum to the Red Guards to surrender, which they did without a shot being fired. The Red Guards were disarmed and its leaders, Halonen and Kannisto, were taken prisoner. The other Red Guards were allowed to go home but were imprisoned later on.

Following the end of the civil war, the victorious Whites charged Kannisto with treason. In August 1918 the State Criminal Court sentenced Kannisto to eight years in prison and loss of civic rights for 12 years. He was imprisoned in Tammisaari concentration camp. He was released from Tammisaari in June 1921.

== Later life ==
Kannisto was secretary of the SDP's branch in Mikkeli Province. from 1921 to 1927 and its president until 1930. He was a member of the municipal council in Mikkeli from 1926. He was on the boards of the Mikkeli workers' co-operative, Osuusliike Savonseutu and the Mikkeli workers' theatre.

Kannisto died on 14 March 1930 at Mikkeli county hospital following a heart attack. He was buried at Mikkeli's new cemetery on 23 March 1930.

== See also ==
- List of MPs in Finland imprisoned for political reasons
