= Jussi Kujala =

Jussi Kujala may refer to:

- Jussi Kujala (footballer)
- Jussi Kujala (politician)
