= Valjakka =

Valjakka is a surname. Notable people with the surname include:

- Albin Valjakka (1877–1918), Finnish journalist
- Hilma Valjakka (1881–1934), Finnish politician
