= Riihimäki prison camp =

Finnish Civil War prison camp

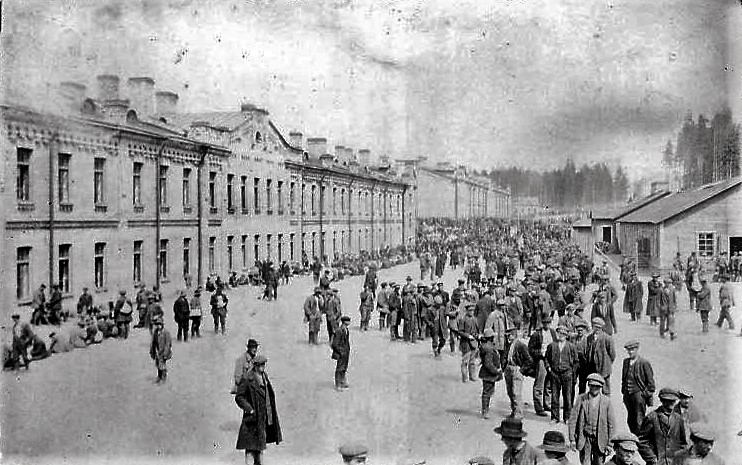
Prisoners at Riihimäki prison camp.

Riihimäki prison camp was a prison camp operating in the area of the Riihimäki garrison after the Finnish Civil War in 1918. It held, at most, around 8 500 red guards. According to the war victims of Finland -database, a total of 981 prisoners died in camp, in result of executions, hunger and disease. The camp was closed down in October 1918, and the forced labour facility replacing it was shut down in the spring of 1921. The memorial of the prison camp is located in the Tienhaara part of Riihimäki.

== The time of the Civil War and executions ==
The Riihimäki red guard got hold of the Riihimäki garrison after the Russian soldiers left in the end of March in 1918. The German Baltic Sea Division invaded Riihimäki on the 22nd of April. Before retreating, the red guards shot nine of the whites whom they held as prisoners in the barracks. Altogether they had 30 whites imprisoned. There is no confirmed information about the identities of the executors. It is very likely that they were not part of the Riihimäki red guards, but rather a division from somewhere else.

After this, the whites executed a total of 141 members of the red guard in Riihimäki and other parts of the Hausjärvi parish. Most of these executions took place in the Riihimäki garrison. After the German invasion, the garrison was under German rule until the start of June 1918.

== Operation of the prison camp ==
The collection of the red guard members to the Riihimäki garrison area began in early May 1918. The number of the prisoners grew. Also, according to official reports the camp held 8,495 prisoners at the most. This was at the time, the 6th largest prison camp in Finland.

On May 23, the responsibility of the prison camp guarding was given to the 5th regiment of South-Ostrobothnia. Later in summer these troops were renamed as the Riihimäki guard battalions. The prison camp, closed down in September 1918 and was transformed into a forced labour facility. It also moved into the rule of civil authority. With this change, only those with certain sentences relating to labour work stayed in Riihimäki, while others were transported either to the Tammisaari prison camp or the prisons in Turku or Lappeenranta by the end of 1920. Officially, the forced labour facility in Riihimäki was stopped in 1921.

== Conditions ==
As many other camps, the prisoners in Riihimäki were forced to live malnourished in cramped and inhumane conditions. The food services in camp were inadequate and food was, at worst, missing from 2 000 prisoners. Foodstuff being on shortage, different things such as straws were baked into bread, causing bowel diseases. The hygiene conditions in camp were horrible, almost nonexistent. The Riihimäki prison camp still wasn't amongst the worst of the camps established by the whites.

Some of the prisoners did forced labour work in the labour colonies owned by businessman H.G.Paloheimo. They got better nutrition then those at the garrison, and were also treated more humanely.

== Memorial and burial sites ==
The Riihimäki prison camp memorial is located in the Tienhaara part of the city. In the same area, lie around 200 prisoners who died on camp. In addition to this so-called Lepola cemetery, prisoners were also buried to the Riihimäki cemetery. Some of the bodies were sent to the home regions of the prisoners. On the establishment-phase of the prison, prisoners were also buried to the forests surrounding the garrison and nearby the Riihimäki garrison church. Lepola cemetery was inaugurated in 1918 by the prison camp priest Urho Valtari. The memorial was put in place in 1950.
