= Kustaa Ahmala =

Finnish politician

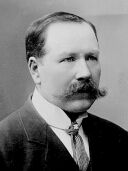
Kustaa Ahmala

Kustaa Ahmala (22 September 1867 – 30 August 1933) was a Finnish factory worker, construction worker, journalist and politician, born in Lumijoki. He was a member of the Parliament of Finland from 1917 to 1918, representing the Social Democratic Party of Finland (SDP).

During the 1918 Finnish Civil War Ahmala was a member of the Central Workers' Council of Finland. After the war he was in prison until 1922.

== See also ==
- List of MPs in Finland imprisoned for political reasons
