= Oskari Ikonen =

Finnish politician (1883–1938)

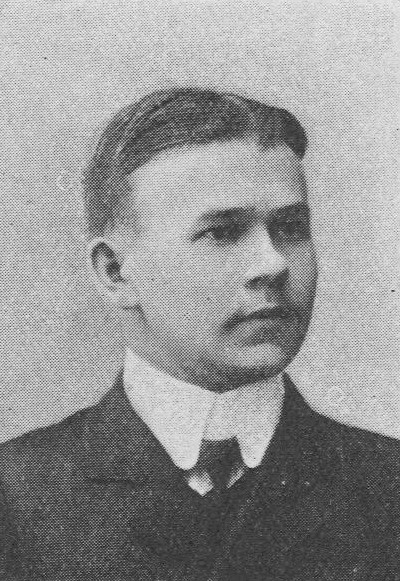
Image of Oskari Ikonen

Oskari Ikonen (3 February 1883 – 21 April 1938) was a Social Democratic Party of Finland politician. He served in the Parliament of Finland from 1913 to 1916. He supported the Reds in the Finnish Civil War of 1918. In 1927, he defected to the Soviet Union. During the Great Purge, he was arrested and imprisoned in February 1938 and later executed. After the death of Joseph Stalin, he was rehabilitated in 1958.

== Life ==
=== Early years ===
Born in Kakonaho, Ilomantsi, Oskari Ikonen's parents were Juho Ikonen (1826-1904) and Kaisa Airaksinen (1844-1895) who came from Eno. He was a Hammaslahti Baptist Church member. After attending five classes at Joensuu Lyseo, Ikonen worked from 1906 to 1912 as an electrician for the State Railways in Viipuri and Varkausi. He was fired because of his political activities; according to some reports the final reason was participation in the May Day March of the Social Democrats. In the years 1912–1913, Ikonen worked as a shop steward in the railway workers' union in Savonlinna, after which he worked in Hiitola as the union's secretary and housekeeper.

=== General strike and civil war ===
Ikonen was a member of parliament for one term from 1914-1917. During the 1917 general strike, he was a member of the staff of the Hiitola strike committee. As the strike continued, Ikonen went to inquire about conditions in Viipuri, from where he returned on the same train with an armed gang led by Heikki Kaljunen. Kaljusen's gang carried out food confiscations in Hiitola and was also accused of robbery and violence.

In January 1918, the whites occupied Hiitola and Ikonen was captured a day before the Finnish Civil War started. Ikonen was initially taken to Sortavala prison camp, from where he was transferred to Kokkola prison camp in February. Ikonen was accused of agitation during the general strike and of complicity in the crimes of Kaljunen's group. He denied the accusations and instead claimed to have freed several of Kaljunen's prisoners and to have prevented their abuse. According to Hiitola's White Guard statement, Ikonen was "a very dangerous Jesuit and a Puritan". He was sentenced to life imprisonment for treason, but was pardoned in 1920.

=== After the war ===
After his release, Ikonen was elected in September 1920 as a representative of the SDP. In the same year, he joined the banned SKP. In the years 1922-1924, Ikonen worked as a traveling speaker and lecturer and was a member of the party's district committee of the eastern constituency of Vaasa Province. Ikonen also worked as a warehouse manager in Hiitola.

In 1923 he was arrested in connection with the so-called "1923 Communist Trial" (Suuri Komunistjuttu 1923). In June 1924, the Turku Court of Appeal sentenced Ikonen to 11 years and 2 months in prison for treason. After the Supreme Court of Finland reduced the sentence to 1 year and 3 months, Ikonen was released on parole from the Tammisaari prison camp in August 1926.

=== Life in the Soviet Union, execution and rehabilitation ===
In January 1927, Ikonen defected to the Soviet Union with his family. He settled in Petrozavodsk and received Soviet citizenship that same spring. Ikonen initially worked at the Petroskoi post office and as the manager of the information transmission unit of the Kalevalsky District. From December 1927, he worked as a mathematics and Finnish language teacher in various parts of Karelia.

In 1937, Ikonen was fired from his teaching post due to alleged nationalism. After his dismissal, Ikonen worked as a mixed laborer at the Onega factory in Petrozavodsk until he was arrested in February 1938 on charges of counter-revolutionary activities. Ikonen received the death sentence and was executed in April near Petroskoi. Ikonen was rehabilitated in 1958.

== Family ==
Oskari Ikonen's spouse was Alina Malberg (b. 1887) from Pukkila, whom he married in 1906. A son and two daughters were born to the family. Veikko Ikonen (b. 1909) was arrested in March 1938 in Petrozavodsk and shot as a spy.

== Sources ==
- Oskari Ikonen. Edustajamatrikkeli. Kansanedustajat 1907 –. Eduskunta (Parliament of Finland). (in Finnish)
- KASNTn NKVDn vuosina 1937–1938 rankaisemien Suomen Eduskunnan entisten jäsenten luettelo
