= Yrjö Leino =

Finnish politician (1897–1961)

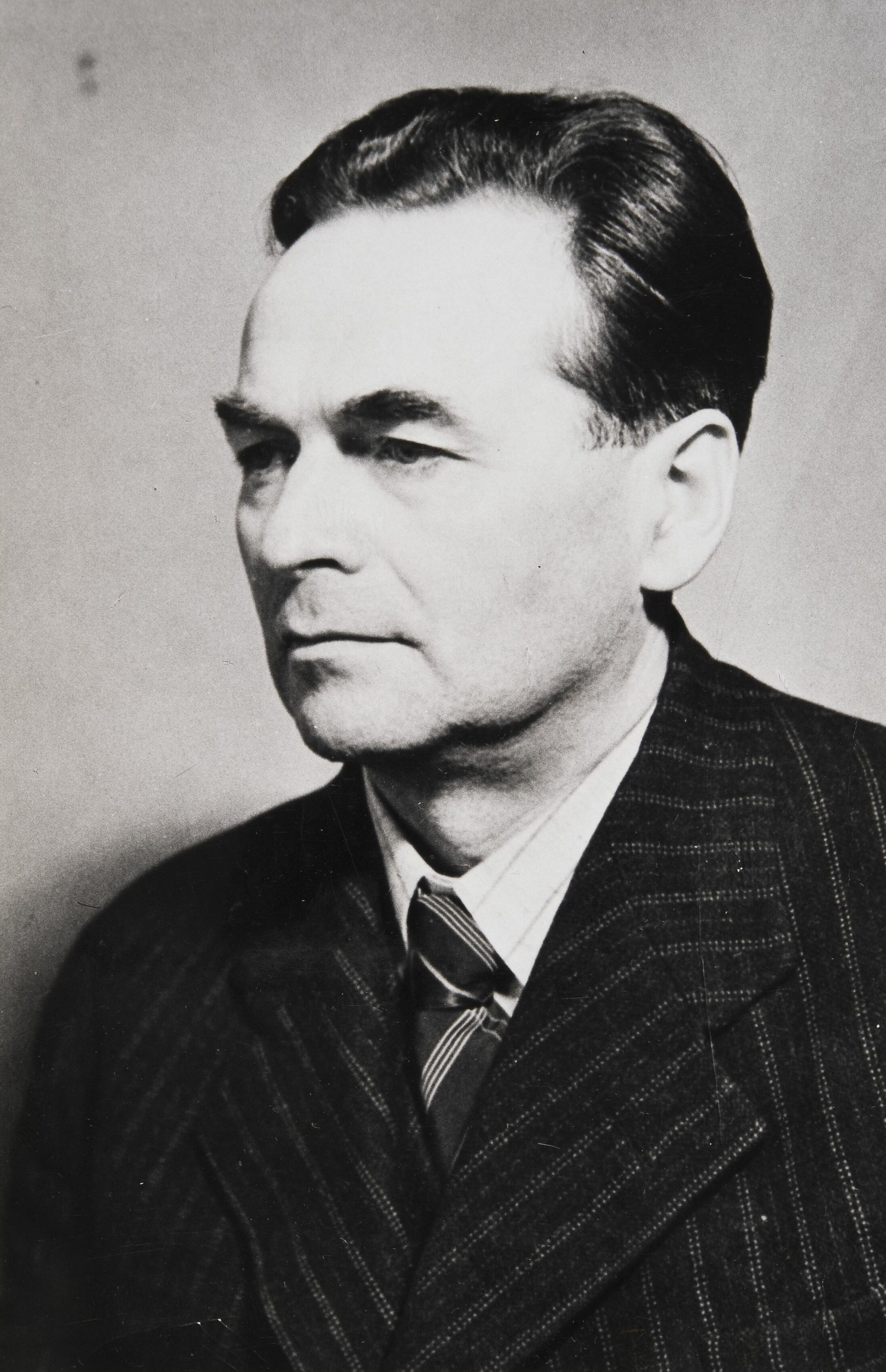
- Leino in the late 1940s.

Minister of the Interior
- In office 26 March 1946 – 22 May 1948
- Prime Minister: Mauno Pekkala
- Preceded by: Kaarlo Hillilä
- Succeeded by: Eino Kilpi

Member of the Finnish Parliament
- In office 18 March 1945 – 2 July 1951
- Constituency: Kuopio

Personal details
- Born: Yrjö Kaarlo Leino; 28 January 1897 Helsinki, Uusimaa, Finland
- Died: 28 June 1961 (aged 64)
- Party: Finnish People's Democratic League

Yrjö Kaarlo Leino (28 January 1897 – 28 June 1961) was a Finnish communist politician. Imprisoned twice for his communist activities, and spending much of the Second World War as an underground communist activist, he served as a minister in three cabinets between 1944 and 1948.

== Early years ==
Yrjö Leino was the only child of tanner Oskar Leino and factory worker Mandi Leino (née Enfors). Leino studied at Normal Lyceum of Helsinki without graduating. In 1921, after working in Helsinki and in casual agricultural jobs, Leino received an agricultural trade school diploma. Around 1924, Leino bought a farm called Lövkulla in Kirkkonummi, but the farm soon led him to financial difficulties. Leino was forced to sell Lövkulla in the early 1930s. Around this time he also separated from his first wife, Alli Simola, and moved to Oitmäki, where his second wife Ulla Smedberg was a teacher. Again, the marriage ended in separation.

== Political captivity ==
Leino moved towards the extreme left in the 1930s. Detectives had begun surveillance on him after the fugitive communist activist Antti Järvinen had visited Leino in Lövkulla in early 1926. The same year Leino was also visited by Arvo Tuominen, who had just been released from prison. In 1935, Leino was sentenced to three and a half years' imprisonment for high treason. During imprisonment at the Tammisaari prison camp, he is said to have formally become a communist. Leino was released from prison in 1938, but the security police Valpo kept him under surveillance. The newly liberated Leino then participated in underground activities of the prohibited Communist Party of Finland.

== War years ==
During the Winter War Leino stayed underground, hiding in communist safe-houses across the Finnish countryside. In those years, Leino became acquainted with his future wife Hertta Kuusinen. In 1940, Leino was detained in a secure facility. His detention continued until 1941, when he escaped from a prison train in Riihimäki, which was taking prisoners to fight in a penal battalion. Leino participated in underground Communist Party activities until the 1944 armistice between Finland and the Soviet Union and the legalization of the Communist Party.

== Parliamentary and ministerial years ==
In the 1945 parliamentary elections, Leino was elected Member of Parliament for the Finnish People's Democratic League (SKDL) from Kuopio. Leino remained in parliament until 1950. He became Minister of the Interior in 1945. Leino's time as Minister of the Interior is often referred to as Finland's "years of peril", as the Communist Party-led control over the Interior Ministry and therefore the internal security apparatus of the nation raised fears of a Communist takeover.

In the spring of 1948, Leino was the SKDL representative in the delegation which negotiated the Finno-Soviet Treaty in Moscow. Some days before the delegation's departure to Moscow, Leino met with the Chief of Defence, General Aarne Sihvo, and presented him with concerns about extreme right-wing and left-wing demonstrations that suggested a coup. Leino asked that the army secure order in Finland while the Finno-Soviet Treaty was being negotiated.

President Paasikivi released Leino from his duties as interior minister in 1948. Parliament had adopted a motion of non confidence of Leino with connection to his illegal handing over of nineteen Finnish citizens and Nansen passport holders ("Leino's prisoners") to the Soviet Union in 1945. Overall, Leino was a minister for 1,283 days. After leaving parliament in 1951, Leino avoided publicity.

== Memoirs controversy ==
Leino returned to the public eye for the last time in 1958 when he published memoirs of his time as Minister of the Interior. Leino had started a manuscript several years earlier but the book was finished with the help of publisher Tammi, Untamo Utrio, and editor, Kalevi Sorsa (who became later prime minister of Finland). The manuscript was prepared in secret – even most of the staff of the publishing company were kept in ignorance – but the project was revealed by Leino because of an indiscretion just before the planned publication. A book intended for public consumption hit a sore point as Finnish-Soviet relations had reached an extremely sensitive stage. Moreover, the SKDL newspaper Kansan Uutiset attacked Leino for publishing the memoir. The paper claimed that the book had been ghost-written by the renegade ex-communist Arvo Tuominen, who, however, had been completely unaware of the project.

Chargé d'Affaires of the Soviet Union in Finland, Ivan Filippov, (Ambassador Viktor Lebedev had suddenly departed from Finland a few weeks earlier on 21 October 1958) demanded that Prime Minister Karl-August Fagerholm's government prevent the release of Leino's memoirs. Fagerholm said that the government could legally do nothing, because the work had not yet been released nor was there censorship in Finland. Filippov advised that if Leino's book was published, the Soviet Union would draw "serious conclusions". Later the same day Fagerholm called the publisher, Untamo Utrio, and it was decided that the January launch of the book was to be cancelled. Eventually, the entire print run of the book was destroyed at the Soviet Union's request. Almost all of the books – some 12,500 copies – were burned in August 1962 with the exception of a few volumes which were furtively sent to political activists. Deputy director of Tammi Jarl Hellemann later argued that the fuss about the book was completely disproportionate to its substance, describing the incident as the first instance of Finnish self-censorship motivated by concerns about relations with the Soviet Union (see Finlandization). The book was finally published in 1991, after the collapse of the Soviet Union, when interest in it had largely dissipated.

== Private life ==
Leino's personal life was often stormy. Leino was first married to Alli Simola. Their daughter Lieko Tuuli Zachovalová (née Leino) (1927–2017) gained fame as radio journalist living in Czechoslovakia. Leino's second marriage, to Ulla Smedberg, produced a son, journalist and author Olle Leino (1932–2021) who resided in Sweden. In 1973, Olle published a biography of his father, "Who was Yrjö Leino" (Swedish: Vem tackar Yrjö Leino), and in 1990, the book "Just one more letter" (Swedish: Ännu ett brev), where he describes the relationship between his father and his third wife Hertta Kuusinen.

Leino died on 28 June 1961, almost entirely forgotten, marked by an ever-worsening problem of alcoholism and a paranoid fear of assassination attempts by the Communists. Leino was buried in the Honkanummi cemetery in Vantaa.
