= Kaarlo Uskela =

Finnish author, poet, and anarchist (1878–1922)

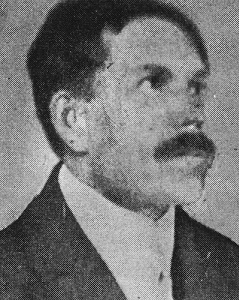
- Born: 4 March 1878; Tampere, Grand Duchy of Finland
- Died: 19 April 1922 (aged 44); Helsinki, Finland
- Occupations: poet, writer, typesetter
- Years active: 1908–1922

Kaarlo Uskela (4 March 1878 – 19 April 1922) was a Finnish satiric author, poet and anarchist. Uskela is best known of his 1921 anthology Pillastunut runohepo which was banned in 1933, eleven years after Uskela's death.

== Biography ==
Uskela was born into a working-class family in Tampere and worked as a typesetter for several newspapers. From 1900 to 1907 Uskela lived in Sweden where he became interested in anarchism. After returning to Finland, Uskela earned his living as a writer. He wrote columns, short stories and causeries for left-wing newspapers and magazines. Uskela was known as a satirical writer, he was making fun of almost everything, the government, church and bourgeoisie and even the labor movement itself.

After the 1918 Finnish Civil War Uskela was sent to the notorious Tammisaari prison camp for several months, although he was not a member of the Red Guards and did not take part on the war. During his imprisonment, Uskela wrote a collection of poems which were released in his 1921 anthology Pillastunut runohepo. Uskela's last literal work was the posthumous Vainovuosilta (1923), a non-satirical anthology of short stories about Finnish Civil War. Uskela died of sepsis in Helsinki, at the age of 44. He had a dental caries, but Uskela refused to see the dentist and treated it by himself. The result was a fatal sepsis.

In 1933, during the right-wing period in Finnish politics, the unsold copies of Uskela's anthology Pillastunut runohepo were confiscated and burned by a court order. It is the only book Finnish authorities have ever destroyed. Uskela's poetry was accused of atheist views and anti-church elements, but they were also described as ″revolutionary and violent″. This was not the first time his works were banned, before the Independence of Finland in 1918 almost all of Uskela's books were confiscated by the Russian authorities.

== Selected works ==
- Yhteiskunnan varkaat (″Thieves of Society″, 1908)
- Villiomenoita (″Wild Apples″, 1912)
- Humoreskeja ja runoja (″Humoresque and Poetry″, 1913)
- Pillastunut runohepo (″Poem Horse Gone Wild″, 1921)
- Vainovuosilta (″From the Years of Persecution″, 1923)
