= Väinö Kallio =

Finnish politician (1897–1938)

Väinö Kallio (17 April 1897, Pihlajavesi – 9 February 1938) was a Socialist Workers' Party of Finland politician. He supported the Reds in the Finnish Civil War of 1918. He served in the Parliament of Finland from 1929 to 1930.

In 1933, he was exiled by the Government of Finland to the Soviet Union. During the Great Purge, he was arrested and imprisoned on January 1, 1938 and later executed. After the death of Joseph Stalin, he was rehabilitated in 1958.

== Early years ==
Väinö Johannes Kallio was born with the surname Suni on April 17, 1897 in Pihlajavesi to Aapo Eemil Vilhelminanpoika and Hilda Maria Miinantytär. He attended public school for three grades and then worked as a carpenter in Kaskis.

In 1917, Kallio was a carpenter in Jyväskylä and joined the Red Guards at the start of the Finnish Civil War.

== Political career ==
After the war, Kallio was imprisoned for political reasons, but escaped from prison to Sweden. From 1920, Kallio was a member of the Communist Party of Finland (SKP) and in 1921 he studied illegally at SKP propagandists' courses in St. Petersburg. Kallio returned to Finland in 1921, completed his military service in Vaasa in 1922–1923, and then worked as a carpenter in Pietarsaari.

Kallio was a Socialist Workers' Party of Finland member of parliament in 1929–1930, representing the northern electoral district of Vaasa Province. Kallio was arrested for distributing communist literature and was imprisoned again in 1930, when his term as a member of parliament ended. Kallio was also a Pietarsaari city councilor and a member of SKP's Pietarsaari district committee and the representative board of Osuusliike Varma.

== Exile, purge and rehabilitation ==
After being released from prison in November 1932, Kallio moved to the Soviet Union in December, where he worked as a foreman in Petrovskoye. He became a Soviet citizen in 1934 and was then a party worker at Sunu state farms in 1934 and as a carpenter in 1936. In the years 1935–1938 he worked at the Kontupohja paper mill at the Kulmuksa forestry site.

Kallio was imprisoned on January 1, 1938, accused of counter-revolutionary nationalist activity. Kallio was sentenced to be shot and executed near Petroskoi on February 9, 1938. He was rehabilitated in 1958.

== Family ==
Kallio was married from 1923 to Anna Taipalee. They had one son.

== Sources ==
- Väinö Kallio. Edustajamatrikkeli. Kansanedustajat 1907 –. Eduskunta (Parliament of Finland). (in Finnish)
- KASNTn NKVDn vuosina 1937–1938 rankaisemien Suomen Eduskunnan entisten jäsenten luettelo
