= Mikko Ampuja =

Finnish politician

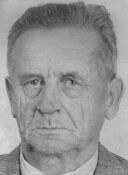
Mikko Ampuja

Mikko Ampuja (25 October 1882, Viipurin maalaiskunta – 15 September 1947) was a Finnish blacksmith and politician. In 1918 he was imprisoned for having sided with the Reds during the Finnish Civil War. He was a member of the Parliament of Finland from 1919 to 1941 and again from 1944 to 1945, representing first the Social Democratic Party of Finland (SDP) and later the Finnish People's Democratic League (SKDL). He was in prison for political reasons from 1941 to 1944. After he was freed, he joined the SKDL and the Socialist Unity Party (SYP), a member organisation of the SKDL.
