= Konsta Talvio =

Finnish politician (1892–1970)

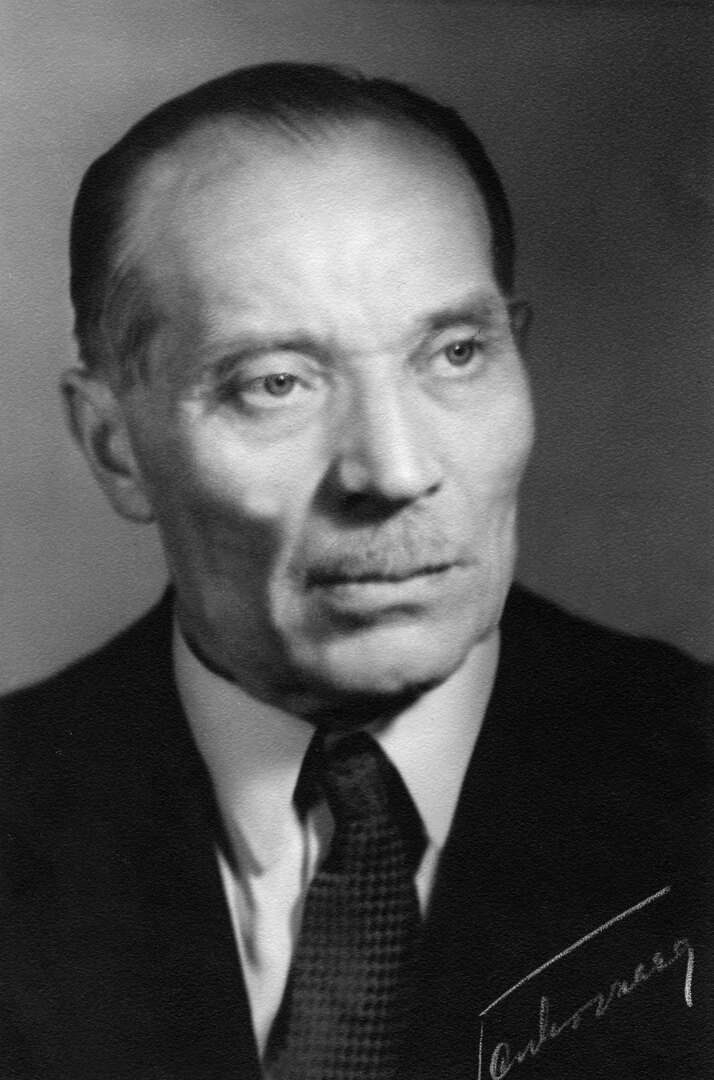

Antti Konstantin (Konsta) Talvio (5 June 1892 in Mäntsälä – 9 August 1970) was a Finnish farmer and politician. He was imprisoned from 1918 to 1920 for having sided with the Reds during the Finnish Civil War. He was a Member of the Parliament of Finland from 1929 to 1930, representing the Socialist Electoral Organisation of Workers and Smallholders. Talvio was again imprisoned for political reasons from 1930 to 1933. He served yet another term as a Member of the Parliament of Finland from 1945 to 1948, this time representing the Finnish People's Democratic League (SKDL). He was a member of the Central Committee of the Communist Party of Finland (SKP).
