= Taneli Typpö =

Finnish politician

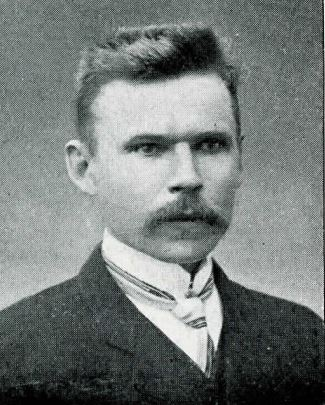
Taneli Typpö, circa 1909

Taneli Typpö (2 March 1878, Virolahti - 17 March 1960) was a Finnish farmer and politician. He was a member of the Parliament of Finland from 1909 to 1918 and again from 1922 to 1929, representing the Social Democratic Party of Finland (SDP). In 1918 he was imprisoned for having sided with the Reds during the Finnish Civil War.
