= Lauri Kantola =

Finnish journalist and politician (1908–1990)

Lauri Kantola (19 April 1908 – 13 April 1990) was a Finnish journalist and politician, born in Reisjärvi. He was a member of the Parliament of Finland from 1962 to 1975, representing the Finnish People's Democratic League (SKDL). Kantola was a member of the Communist Party of Finland (SKP). He had joined the SKP in 1926, when it was still illegal in Finland. This led to a prison sentence from 1929 to 1933. From 1933 to 1938, Kantola studied at the International Lenin School in Moscow, after which he returned to Finland, where he was again imprisoned for political reasons from 1941 to 1944. The Moscow Armistice of 19 September 1944 led to the legalization of the SKP and Kantola recovered his liberty and his political activities. He was a presidential elector in the 1962 and 1968 presidential elections.
