= Olga Terho =

Finnish politician (1910–2003)

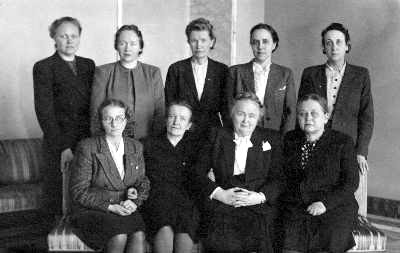
Female SKDL parliamentarians. Olga Terho on the left in the front row.

Olga Lydia Terho (née Virtanen) (23 July 1910 - 22 November 2003) was a Finnish politician. She represented the Finnish People's Democratic League in the Eduskunta from 1945 to 1948.

Olga Virtanen was born on 23 July 1910 in Siikainen, a rural village in south-western Finland. Her parents were Evert Virtanen and Hilma Kaisantytär, and she grew up in a tenant peasant family. She completed four years of elementary school. She began as a seamstress working at age of 15. In 1929 she moved to Lahti. In Lahti she became involved in left-wing politics, joining a leftist sports club and an association to support political prisoners. She befriended Väino Sievänen, who invited her to become a member of the District Committee of the underground Communist Party of Finland (SKP).

Olga Virtanen was a political prisoner 1932–1933, 1936-1940 and 1941–1944. In 1932 she was arrested by the Detective Central Police. She spent months in jail before being given a suspended eight-month sentence in 1933. After leaving jail Virtanen migrated to Leningrad, Soviet Union. In Leningrad she attended a party school.

The party school was closed down in June 1936. Virtanen returned to Finland in October 1936. She was pregnant at the time, the father of her child was killed in a purge. She was again arrested and sentenced to four years in jail for treason in January 1937. She and her baby were held at Hämeenlinna prison. In 1939 Sievänen helped arrange for her child to stay with a foster family in Lahti. Virtanen was released in the fall of 1940, but was restricted from leaving Helsinki and could rarely see her child. In Helsinki she became an activist in the Society for Peace and Friendship between Finland and the Soviet Union. In October 1941 she was again arrested and sentenced to eight years imprisonment for treason.

Virtanen was released from jail after the 1944 armistice. Soon after returning to Helsinki the Communist Party sent her to work as organizer in south-western Finland. She married Martti Rafael Terho in 1945. Olga Terho was elected to parliament in the 1945 Finnish parliamentary election, standing as a SKDL candidate in the Turku North I constituency.

Olga Terho was a member of the Pori municipal council. She died on 22 November 2003.
