= Emil Wichmann =

Finland-Swedish educator, author and politician (1856–1938)

Viktor Karl Emil Wichmann
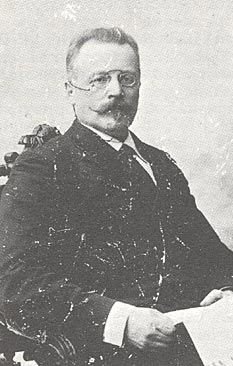
- Born: 24 August 1856; Lumijoki, Grand Duchy of Finland
- Died: 21 January 1938 (aged 81); Helsinki, Finland
- Other name: Gånge Rolf
- Occupations: Educator; author; politician

Viktor Karl Emil Wichmann (24 August 1856 – 21 January 1938) was a Finland-Swedish educator, poet and politician who is best remembered under his pen name Gånge Rolf. His career was centred on the teacher seminary in Nykarleby, where he taught for over three decades, but he was also a prominent figure in the student-led Svecoman movement of the 1880s, a one-term member of the Diet of Finland, and the author of textbooks, poetry collections and local histories that circulated widely in the Swedish-speaking parts of Finland.

== Early life and education ==
Wichmann was born in Lumijoki, in northern Ostrobothnia, where his father Viktor Vilhelm Wichmann served as a Lutheran clergyman before being appointed vicar of the nearby coastal town of Brahestad (Raahe). His mother was Emilie Augusta Ophelia Bergstedt. Wichmann attended schools in Gamlakarleby (Kokkola) and Uleåborg (Oulu) and completed his secondary education at the latter in 1877, the same year he enrolled at the university in Helsinki. He took his master's degree in philosophy in 1882.

== The language struggle ==
Wichmann's student years coincided with the most heated phase of the language strife, the conflict between the Finnish- and Swedish-language nationalist movements that shaped Finnish university life in the 1870s and 1880s. Although the Ostrobothnian student nation drew most of its members from Swedish-speaking coastal areas, its political culture was at the time dominated by the Finnish-nationalist line associated with Yrjö Koskinen, and the nation's small Swedish-minded minority found itself under considerable pressure. Wichmann emerged as the most visible of these dissenters. Inspired in part by the work of Axel Olof Freudenthal in the Nyland nation, he became, alongside Freudenthal himself, a central organiser of the academic Svecoman movement. On his initiative, a free student association known as U.V. — short for Uleåborgare och Vasaiter, the students from Oulu and Vaasa — was formed on 13 March 1881 to pursue the cause of Swedish-language equality within the Ostrobothnian nation.

This activist phase shaped much of Wichmann's later public profile. Contemporaries described him as a fearless and rousing speaker, and his early poetry, published under the name Gånge Rolf, was conceived as a call to arms for Swedish-speaking academic youth.

== Teacher in Nykarleby ==
After short stints as a substitute teacher at the Swedish lyceum in Viborg, the realschool in Kuopio, a girls' school in Helsinki and the Cadet Corps at Fredrikshamn, Wichmann was appointed in 1883 to a permanent lectureship in history, geography and pedagogy at the elementary teacher seminary in Nykarleby. He was 27 years old. The post would remain his main employment until 1916; from 1905 he served also as deputy director and from 1912 as director of the institution.

His tenure in Nykarleby was interrupted in September 1903, when the Russification policies of the period known in Finnish historiography as the "Years of Oppression" forced him, as an outspoken constitutionalist, to take leave from his post and leave the country. He spent the next two years in Stockholm, teaching at the Palmgren School, the Åhlin Girls' School and the Stockholm Elementary School, and returned to Finland and to Nykarleby in the summer of 1905.

In addition to his work at the seminary, Wichmann sat on the Nykarleby town council from 1885, served on the local savings bank board, and was active in the volunteer fire brigade movement, helping to found brigades and youth associations in several Ostrobothnian localities.

== Political career ==
After his return from Sweden, Wichmann took an active role in national politics. He was elected to the unicameral Diet of Finland in 1908 as a candidate of the Swedish People's Party from the northern Vaasa constituency, serving a single term in 1908–1909. He was subsequently a member of the Swedish Assembly in 1918–1919, the body that emerged as the political representation of Finland's Swedish-speaking population following independence.

== Later years ==
Wichmann formally retired from the Nykarleby seminary in 1916 but did not withdraw from teaching. He taught for several years at the Oulunkylä Swedish co-educational school in suburban Helsinki, served as acting archivist at the Finnish Board of Navigation from 1919 to 1923, and held a temporary senior lectureship at the Åland Lyceum in Mariehamn in 1927–1929. He was a much-requested public speaker, lecturing on military history to the Swedish-speaking units of the Finnish army from 1919 onward, and in 1930 he was hired as an auxiliary speaker by the southern Uusimaa district of the Civil Guard.

In 1929, at the age of 73, Wichmann travelled to the United States with his daughter Gerda on a lecture tour arranged by Finland-Swedish communities there. He published an account of the trip the same year as Resa bland Finlandssvenskarne i Amerika. He was twice married: first to Katarina (Karin) Julin, and from 1921 to Alfhild Maria Brunell. He died in Helsinki in January 1938.

== Literary work ==
Wichmann's pen name, Gånge Rolf, echoes the Old Norse byname of Rollo of Normandy and signals the Gothicist and Viking-romantic register that characterises much of his poetry. His debut, På fria banor (1880), and the follow-up Dikt och drapa (1882) were intentionally programmatic — a literary counterpart to his political activism, addressing Swedish-speaking students with a celebration of a putative Germanic heritage. Several of these poems were set to music and became standards in Finland's Swedish-language song repertoire. Wichmann continued to publish verse for the next four decades, with collections including Bilder och ballader (1886), Klubbekriget (1893, a cycle on the Cudgel War), Maning och minne (1910) and Svenskhets-sånger (1919).

In parallel with his poetry, Wichmann was an industrious writer of school textbooks. His Allmän historia: läro- och läsebok för folkskolor (1900), a general history reader for elementary schools, went through six editions, and was followed by separate volumes on antiquity (1905), the Middle Ages (1906) and the history of Finland (1908), as well as a geography textbook (1903 onward) and a pedagogical anthology (1904). A second strand of his non-fiction work consisted of local and institutional histories, among them commemorative volumes on the town of Nykarleby (1920), Tenala parish (1928), the Nyland Regiment and the Royal Vaasa Regiment. His memoir Hågkomster från min Nykarleby-tid was published in 1933.

== Selected works ==
=== Poetry and fiction ===
- På fria banor (1880)
- Dikt och drapa (1882)
- Bilder och ballader (1886)
- Klubbekriget: en diktcykel (1893)
- Tattarprinsen (1895), a historical novella set during Gustav III's war in Finland
- Maning och minne (1910)
- Svenskhets-sånger (1919)
- Mandom, mod och morska män (1923)

=== Textbooks and historical writings ===
- Allmän historia: läro- och läsebok för folkskolor (1900)
- Grunddragen till Finlands uppfostrings- och undervisningsväsendes historia (1903)
- Folkskolans geografi och kartbok (1904)
- Gamla tidens historia (1905)
- Medeltidens historia (1906)
- Finlands historia jämte kort sammandrag af Finlands statskunskap (1908)
- Nykarleby stad 1620–1920 (1920)
- Historik över Tenala socken (1928)
- Resa bland Finlandssvenskarne i Amerika (1929)
- Hågkomster från min Nykarleby-tid: 1883–1916 (1933)
