= Ville Riihinen =

Finnish carpenter, cooperative organizer and politician (1898–1974)

Vilhelm (Ville) Riihinen (30 May 1898 – 20 February 1974) was a Finnish carpenter, cooperative organizer and politician, born in Keuruu. He was a member of the Parliament of Finland from 1945 to 1951, representing the Finnish People's Democratic League (SKDL). He was a member of the Communist Party of Finland (SKP). After the Finnish Civil War of 1918, Riihinen was imprisoned for a while for having sided with the Reds. He was again imprisoned for political reasons from 1925 to 1928, from 1930 to 1934 and from 1939 to 1940.
