= Esa Hietanen =

Esa Hietanen (15 July 1896, in Suonenjoki – 15 October 1962) was a Finnish logger, sawmill worker, journalist and politician. He was in prison for political reasons from 1926 to 1927, from 1930 to 1934 and from 1939 to 1940. He was a member of the Parliament of Finland from 1945 until his death in 1962, representing the Finnish People's Democratic League (SKDL). He was a member of the Central Committee of the Communist Party of Finland (SKP).
