= Toivo Niiranen =

Finnish politician (1919–2003)

Toivo Niiranen (26 February 1919, Liperi – 15 June 2003) was a Finnish smallholder and politician. He was imprisoned for political reasons for a while in 1944. Niiranen was a Member of the Parliament of Finland from 1951 to 1966, representing the Finnish People's Democratic League (SKDL). He was a member of the Central Committee of the Communist Party of Finland (SKP) as well.
