= Aleksander Allila =

Finnish politician (born 1890)

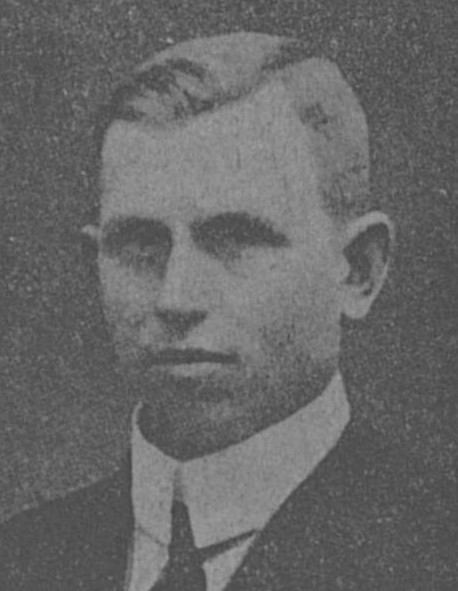
- Allila in 1924

Member of the Parliament of Finland
- In office 1 May 1924 – 1 September 1927
- Constituency: Uusimaa

Personal details
- Born: Aleksanteri Stepaninpoika Allinen; 14 April 1890 Suistamo, Grand Duchy of Finland, Russian Empire
- Party: Socialist Electoral Organisation of Workers and Smallholders

Aleksander Allila (14 April 1890 – ?) was a Finnish politician and member of the Parliament of Finland, the national legislature. A member of the Socialist Electoral Organisation of Workers and Smallholders, he represented Uusimaa between May 1924 and September 1927.

== Biography ==
Allila was born on 14 April 1890 in Suistamo in the Grand Duchy of Finland. He worked as a painter in Suistamo until 1912 and in Helsinki from 1912. Allila was imprisoned for political reasons in 1918 following the end of the Finnish Civil War.

In January 1923 the Court of Appeal of Turku convicted Allila of three counts of inciting a crime in a speech he gave in the autumn of 1921. He was sentenced to one month of imprisonment but the sentence was not implemented. However, in the spring of 1926, whilst a serving Member of Parliament, he was sent to prison. He moved to the Soviet Union in 1932. His whereabouts have been unknown since he was last seen alive in a labour camp in Leningrad in 1933.
