= Vihtori Huhta =

Finnish journalist and politician (1882–1961)

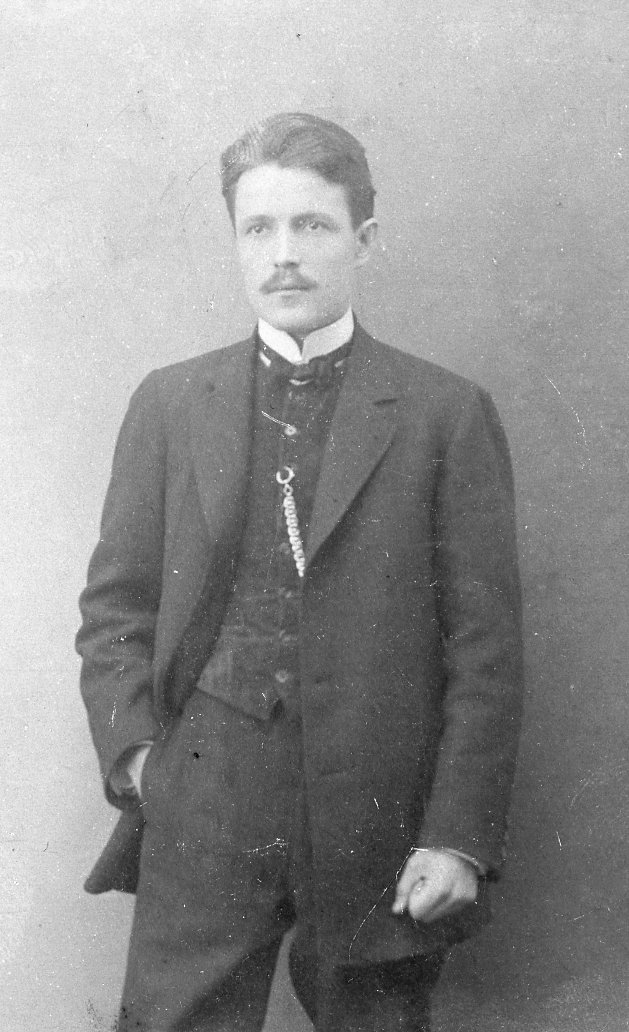
Huhta in the 1910s

Viktor (Vihtori) Emil Huhta (30 September 1882 – 11 July 1961; original surname Lindroos) was a Finnish journalist and politician, born in Hämeenlinna. He was a member of the Parliament of Finland from 1913 to 1916, and again from 1941 to 1945, representing the Social Democratic Party of Finland (SDP). He was imprisoned in 1918 for having sided with the Reds during the Finnish Civil War.
