= Julius Sundberg =

Finnish politician (1887–1931)

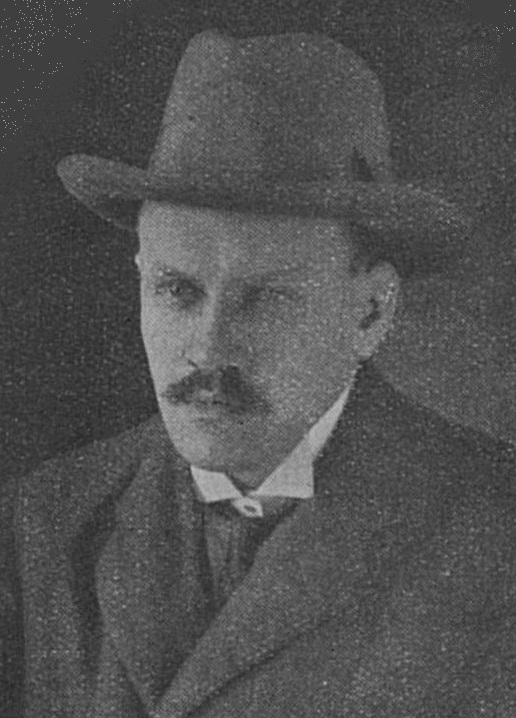
Julius Sundberg

Julius Berndt Sundberg (13 September 1887, Helsinki – 15 January 1931) was a Finnish journalist and politician. He was a Member of the Parliament of Finland from 1916 to 1917, representing the Social Democratic Party of Finland (SDP). He was imprisoned for some time in 1918 for having sided with the Reds during the Finnish Civil War.
