= Kalle Kankari =

Finnish politician (1889–1948)

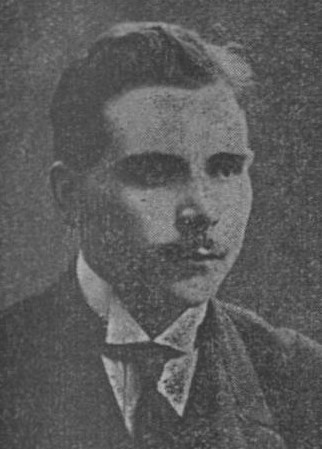
- Kankari in 1922

Member of the Parliament of Finland
- In office 5 September 1922 – 17 October 1923
- Constituency: Uusimaa

Personal details
- Born: Kaarle August Kankari; 28 January 1889 Paimio, Russian Empire
- Died: 5 June 1948 (aged 59) Turku, Finland
- Party: Socialist Workers' Party

Kaarle August Kankari (28 January 1889 – 5 June 1948) was a Finnish trade unionist, politician and member of the Parliament of Finland, the national legislature. A member of the Socialist Workers' Party, he represented Uusimaa between September 1922 and October 1923.

Kankari was born on 28 January 1889 in Paimio. He was a carpenter in Uskela and Helsinki. He was chairman of the Finnish Woodworkers Union (Suomen Puutyöntekijäin Liitto) from 1917 to 1918 and from 1919 to 1921. Kankari was imprisoned for political reasons following the end of the Finnish Civil War in 1918. He was released in 1919. He was a Finnish Trade Union Federation official from 1921 to 1922 and chairman of the Finnish Sawmill, Transport and Mixed Workers Union (Suomen Saha-, Kuljetus- ja Sekatyöväen Liitto) from 1922 to 1924.

Kankari was imprisoned again in August 1923 and a third time in the early 1930s. He was a Finnish Paper Association (Suomen Paperiliitto) official from 1929 to 1930. He was a carpenter in Turku until his death on 5 June 1948.
