= Severi Kurkinen =

Finnish politician (1879–1945)

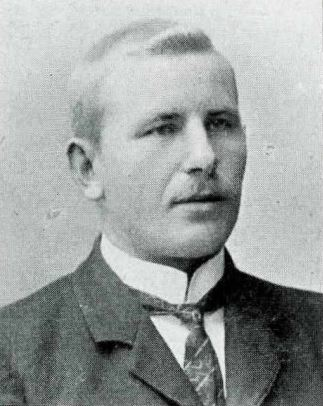
Severi Kurkinen in 1910

Severi Kurkinen (3 June 1879 – 24 March 1945; original surname Hietalin) was a Finnish politician, born in Luopioinen. He was a member of the Parliament of Finland from 1910 to 1917, representing the Social Democratic Party of Finland (SDP). He was imprisoned after the Finnish Civil War of 1918 for having sided with the Reds.
