= Otto Peitsalo =

Finnish cooperative organizer and politician (1870–1929)

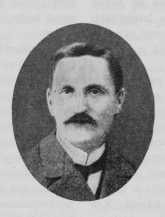
Otto Peitsalo

Otto Peitsalo (13 March 1870 – 16 May 1929; surname until 1906 Palén) was a Finnish cooperative organizer and politician, born in Lieto. He was a member of the Parliament of Finland from 1916 to 1917, representing the Social Democratic Party of Finland (SDP). During the Finnish Civil War of 1918, he worked in the administration of the Finnish Socialist Workers' Republic. After the defeat of the Red side, Peitsalo was given a prison sentence of ten years for his role in the war. He was pardoned in 1920 and resumed his liberty.
