= Gösta Rosenberg =

Finnish politician (1911–1987)

Gösta Mauritz Rosenberg (6 November 1911 – 10 September 1987) was a Finnish politician, born in Vaasa. He was a member of the Parliament of Finland from 1945 to 1966, representing the Finnish People's Democratic League (SKDL). He was a presidential elector in the 1950, 1956, 1962 and 1968 presidential elections. He was a member of the Central Committee of the Communist Party of Finland (SKP). Rosenberg was imprisoned for political reasons from 1939 to 1940. He was the son of Mauritz Rosenberg.
