= Aimo Aaltonen =

Finnish politician (1906–1987)

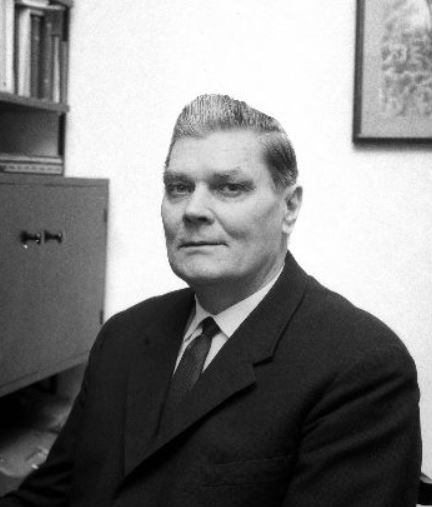

Leader of the Communist Party of Finland
- In office 1944–1945
- Preceded by: Jukka Lehtosaari
- Succeeded by: Aaro Uusitalo
- In office 1948–1966
- Preceded by: Aaro Uusitalo
- Succeeded by: Aarne Saarinen

Deputy Leader of the Valpo
- In office 1946–1949

Member of Parliament for Finland Proper
- In office 6 April 1945 – 19 February 1962

Personal details
- Born: 10 December 1906 Pargas, Finland
- Died: 21 September 1987 (aged 80) Helsinki, Finland
- Party: SKP; SKDL

Aimo Anshelm Aaltonen (10 December 1906 – 21 September 1987) was a Finnish construction worker, carpenter, and politician.

== Biography ==
Aaltonen was born in Pargas and was the middle of 3 sons, and had multiple jobs by the time he was ten, and became a carpenter at 13. At 17 he joined the Worker's Sports Federation (AIF) and approached other left-wing organizations. Having been in touch with communists from his local area, he became a communist as a young man and went to the Soviet Union in 1930, where he studied from 1930 to 1933 at the Communist University of the National Minorities of the West in Leningrad. Shortly after he returned to Finland, he was arrested on sedition charges and spent ten years in prison. In 1944 he was freed as a result of the Moscow Armistice of 19 September 1944, which led to the legalisation of the Communist Party of Finland (SKP). Aaltonen served as the chairman of the SKP from 1944 to 1945 and again from 1948 to 1966. He was the deputy chief of the VALPO (the Finnish Security Service) from 1945 to 1947. He was a member of the Parliament of Finland from 1945 to 1962, representing the Finnish People's Democratic League (SKDL).
