= Nestori Nurminen =

Finnish carpenter and politician (1907–1977)

Nestori Mattias (Matias) Nurminen (9 May 1907 – 22 March 1977) was a Finnish carpenter and politician, born in Kokkola. He was a member of the Parliament of Finland from 1945 to 1962 and from 1966 to 1970, representing the Finnish People's Democratic League (SKDL). Nurminen was a member of the Communist Party of Finland (SKP). He became involved with the SKP in the 1920s, when it still was illegal in Finland. In 1930 he travelled to the Soviet Union, where he studied at the Communist University of the National Minorities of the West. In 1932 he returned to Finland and was imprisoned for political reasons from 1932 to 1937 and again from 1940 to 1944. The Moscow Armistice of 19 September 1944 led to the legalization of the SKP. Nurminen recovered his liberty and resumed his political activities. He was a presidential elector in the 1950, 1956 and 1943 presidential elections.
