= Aukusti Turunen =

Finnish smallholder and politician (1888–1967)

Aukusti (August) Turunen (19 November 1888 – 18 December 1967) was a Finnish smallholder and politician, born in Kuopion maalaiskunta. He was a member of the Parliament of Finland from 1927 to 1930, representing the Socialist Electoral Organisation of Workers and Smallholders and again from 12 to 21 July 1948, representing the Finnish People's Democratic League (SKDL). He was a presidential elector in the 1925 Finnish presidential election. After the Finnish Civil War of 1918, Turunen was imprisoned for a while for having sided with the Reds. He was again imprisoned for political reasons from 1930 to 1933.
