= Taavi Tainio =

Finnish politician and journalist

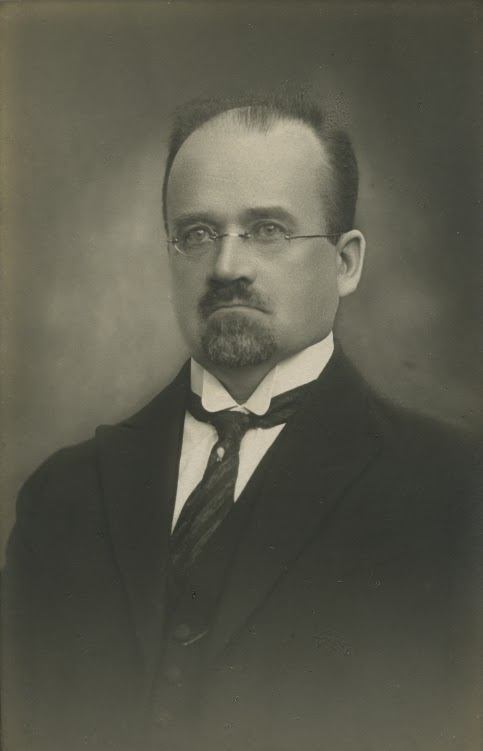
Taavi Tainio

David (Taavi) Tainio (25 June 1874, Keuruu - 17 March 1929) was a Finnish journalist and politician. He was a member of the Parliament of Finland from 1907 to 1909, from 1911 to 1913 and from 1922 until his death in 1929, representing the Social Democratic Party of Finland (SDP). He was the chairman of the SDP from 1903 to 1905 and party secretary from 1918 to 1926. He was imprisoned for a while in 1918 for having sided with the Reds during the Finnish Civil War.
