= Frans Hiilos =

Finnish politician (1891–1952)

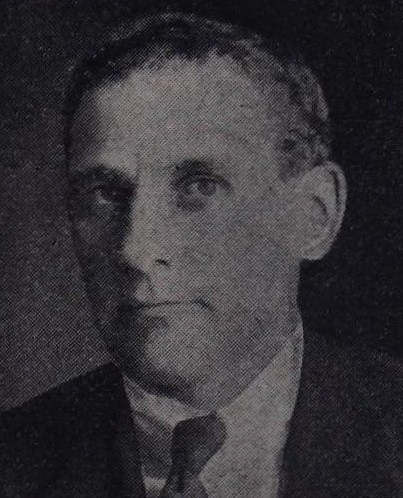
A photo of Hiilos

Frans Werner Hiilos (18 May 1891, Lohja - 16 April 1952; surname until 1906 Hagman) was a Finnish sailor, railway worker, trade union functionary and politician. From 1918 to 1920 he was imprisoned for having sided with the Reds during the Finnish Civil War. From 1922 to 1923 he was a member of the Parliament of Finland, representing the Socialist Workers' Party of Finland (SSTP). From 1923 to 1926 he served a second prison sentence for sedition.

Hiilos was a participant in the 3rd World Congress of the Communist International.
