= Armas Paasonen =

Finnish politician

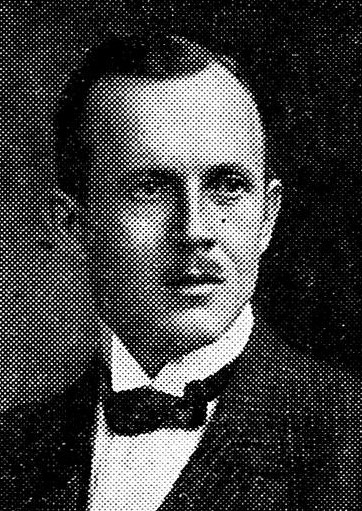
- Paasonen in 1927
- Born: August 29, 1885
- Died: November 15, 1950 (aged 65)
- Occupations: Railwayman, politician
- Known for: Being imprisoned during the Finnish Civil War

Armas Johannes Paasonen (29 August 1885, Viipuri – 15 November 1950) was a Finnish railwayman and politician.

Paasonen was a Member of the Parliament of Finland from 1911 to 1918, from 1924 to 1929, from 1930 to 1933 and again from 1936 to 1945, representing the Social Democratic Party of Finland (SDP).

He was imprisoned from 1918 to 1919 for having sided with the Reds during the Finnish Civil War.
