= Elsa Karppinen =

Finnish journalist and politician

Elsa Dagmar Karppinen (née Korhonen; 21 May 1901 - 30 April 1957) was a Finnish journalist and politician, born in Kemi. As an active communist at a time when the Communist Party of Finland (SKP) was still illegal, she was imprisoned three times for a total of 12 years before the SKP was legalised as a result of the Moscow Armistice of 19 September 1944. She was subsequently elected to the Parliament of Finland, where she represented the Finnish People's Democratic League (SKDL) from 1945 to 1948.
