= Julius Nurminen =

Finnish politician

Julius Ivar Nurminen (9 June 1887 – 24 July 1918) was a Finnish journalist and politician, born in Sääksmäki. He was a member of the Parliament of Finland from 1916 to 1918, representing the Social Democratic Party of Finland (SDP). He was imprisoned in 1918 for having sided with the Reds during the Finnish Civil War. He died in detention at the Tammisaari prison camp, Ekenäs.
