= Toivo Halonen =

Finnish politician (1893–1984)

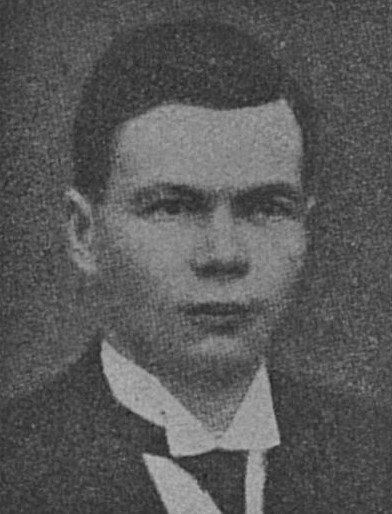
Tiovo Halonen in 1931

Toivo Juhana Halonen (7 July 1893 – 29 October 1984) was a Finnish smallholder and politician. He was born in Sääminki. He was imprisoned in 1918 for having sided with the Reds during the Finnish Civil War. He was a member of the Parliament of Finland from 1922 to 1945, representing the Social Democratic Party of Finland (SDP).
