= Jukka Lehtosaari =

Finnish politician (1889–1939)

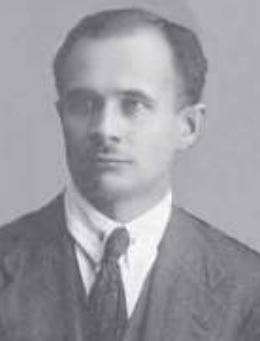
Lehtosaari in the 1930s

Johan Arndt "Jukka" Lehtosaari (né Forsman; 15 January 1889 – 2 September 1939) was a Finnish politician, born in Kärkölä. He was a member of the Parliament of Finland from 1916 to 1918, representing the Social Democratic Party of Finland (SDP). During the Finnish Civil War of 1918, he worked as the secretary of the Finnish People's Delegation, which functioned as the government of the Finnish Socialist Workers' Republic. After the defeat of the Red side, Lehtosaari went into exile in Soviet Russia. He joined the Communist Party of Finland (SKP), founded in Moscow by political exiles on 29 August 1918. He returned clandestinely to Finland in 1919, but was arrested by Finnish authorities and was given a prison sentence for sedition. He recovered his liberty in 1926 and moved to the Soviet Union, where he found work as a teacher at the Communist University of the National Minorities of the West and at the International Lenin School. In 1937, Lehtosaari was elected Chairman of the Communist Party of Finland. However, in January 1938, during the Great Purge, he was arrested as suspected of counterrevolutionary activities. He was given a five-year prison sentence. Lehtosaari died in a prison camp in Perm Oblast on 2 September 1939.
