= Albin Valjakka =

Finnish politician (1877–1918)

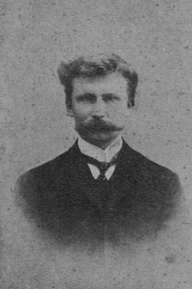
The member of the Parliament of Finland, Albin Valjakka (1877-1918)

Albin Valjakka (10 July 1877, Mikkelin maalaiskunta – 29 June 1918) was a Finnish journalist and politician. He was a Member of the Parliament of Finland from 1907 to 1918, representing the Social Democratic Party of Finland (SDP). During the Finnish Civil War of 1918, Valjakka sided with the Reds, was arrested in Viipuri by White troops on 7 May and died in detention on 29 June 1918.
