= Jukka Tuomikoski =

Finnish politician

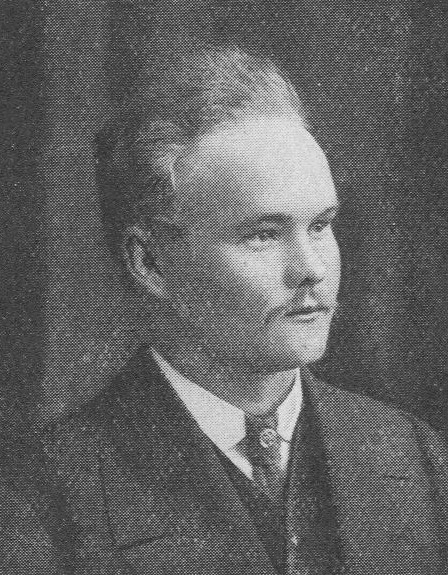
Tuomikoski

Juho (Jukka) Arvid Tuomikoski (29 August 1884 in Keuruu – 6 December 1956) was a Finnish house painter and politician. He was a member of the Parliament of Finland from 1913 to 1916 and again from 1917 to 1918, representing the Social Democratic Party of Finland (SDP). He was in prison from 1918 to 1921 for having sided with the Reds during the Finnish Civil War.
