= Kalle Kauhanen =

Finnish politician (1900–1969)

Kalle Jalmari Kauhanen (20 June 1900, Leppävirta - 19 December 1969) was a Finnish bricklayer and politician. He was in prison for political reasons from 1931 to 1934. He was subsequently elected to the Parliament of Finland, where he represented the Finnish People's Democratic League (SKDL) from 1945 to 1949 and the Social Democratic Party of Finland (SDP) from 1949 to 1951 and again from 1954 to 1958. Kauhanen was originally a member of the Communist Party of Finland (SKP), but after he refused in October 1948 to join in a motion of no confidence presented by the SKDL parliamentary group to the Social Democratic cabinet led by Karl-August Fagerholm, he was accused of titoism and excluded from the SKP, after which he joined the Social Democratic Party.
