= Toivo Kujala =

Finnish electrician and politician

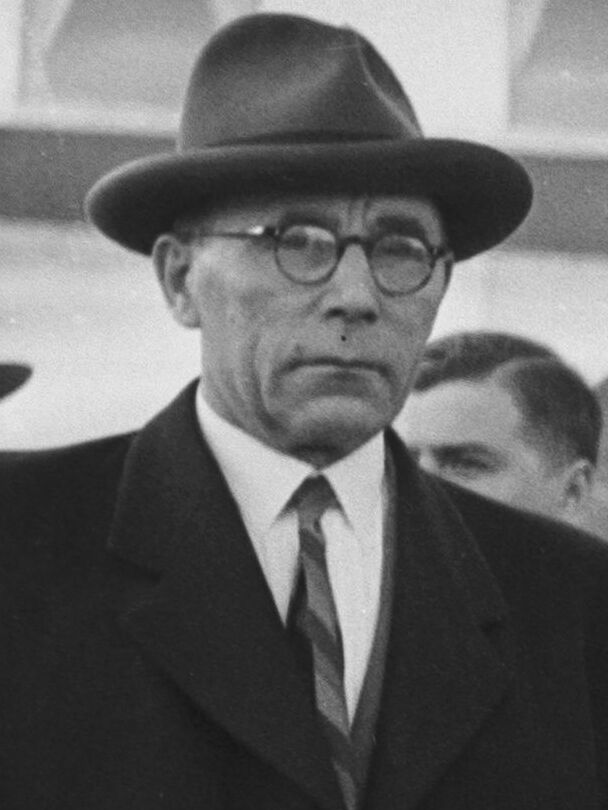
- Toivo Kujala in 1950
- Born: Toivo Edvard Kujala; 18 November 1894; Sippola, Grand Duchy of Finland
- Died: 7 April 1959 (aged 64)
- Occupations: electrician and politician
- Known for: imprisoned as member of Communist Party of Finland (SKP), member, Parliament of Finland
- Political party: Finnish People's Democratic League (SKDL)

Toivo Edvard Kujala (18 November 1894, Sippola – 7 April 1959) was a Finnish electrician and politician. In 1918 he was imprisoned for having sided with the Reds during the Finnish Civil War. In the 1920s he became an organiser for the then illegal Communist Party of Finland (SKP), which led to a second prison sentence in 1931. He was imprisoned for a third time during World War II and freed in 1944 after the Communist Party was legalised as a result of the Moscow Armistice of 19 September 1944. He was subsequently elected to the Parliament of Finland, where he represented the Finnish People's Democratic League (SKDL) from 1945 until his death in 1959. Kujala was a member of the Central Committee of the SKP.
