= Jukka Lankila =

Finnish journalist and politician

Johan (Jukka) Aleksander Lankila (5 April 1881 - 15 April 1919) was a Finnish journalist and politician, born in Raahe. He was a member of the Parliament of Finland from 1917 to 1918, representing the Social Democratic Party of Finland (SDP). He was imprisoned from 1918 to 1919 for having sided with the Reds during the Finnish Civil War. He died in detention from influenza in Helsinki.
