= Ekenäs prison camp =

Concentration camp and prison in Finland 1918–1940

Coordinates: 59°59′16″N 23°29′10″E

Ekenäs camp
- Concentration camp
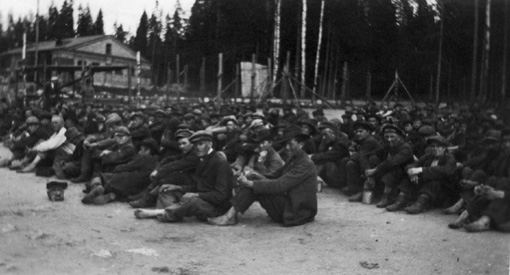
- Prisoners of Ekenäs in 1918
- Location: Dragsvik, Ekenäs, Finland
- Operated by: Finnish Whites, Government of Finland
- Operational: May 1918 – 1940
- Inmates: Finnish Reds, Finnish Communists
- Number of inmates: c. 8,700 (highest)
- Killed: c. 3,000

The Ekenäs camp was a concentration camp and prison in Dragsvik, Ekenäs in Finland. It was set for the Reds captured by the Whites in the 1918 Finnish Civil War. The concentration camp operated from May 1918 to 15 September 1918 when the majority of the captured Reds were released on parole. Ekenäs camp was then turned into a forced labour camp for convicted Reds and later in the early 1920s into a facility for political prisoners. Ekenäs camp was known as the most notorious of all Finnish Civil War prison camps. Between May and September 1918 nearly 3,000 of the 8,700 prisoners died of executions, disease or malnutrition.

== Finnish Civil War ==
The first captured Reds were transferred to the former barracks of the Imperial Russian Army in Dragsvik in early May 1918. During the next six months, 8,597 prisoners were held in Ekenäs, it was about 11% of all the captured Reds. Conditions in the camp were horrible, general hygiene was bad and there was a lack of food supplies. Inmates died of malnutrition and various disease, including the Spanish influenza that caught Finland in July. According to the War Victims of Finland 1914–1922 internet database, a total number of 2,997 prisoners died in Ekenäs between May and December 1918. The mortality rate was 34%, which was the highest among the Finnish Civil War prison camps. The deceased were buried in a mass grave outside the prison. A memorial was erected in 1951 and a permanent exhibition opened in 2008.

== Political prisoners ==
After the mass amnesties of the Civil War prisoners Ekenäs penitentiary was turned into a labor camp for political prisoners, meaning the activists of the banned Communist Party of Finland and Socialist Workers' Party of Finland. Female prisoners, like Hertta Kuusinen, were held at the Häme Castle in Hämeenlinna. The political prisoners had some privileges, they had less work and were allowed to order newspapers. As the communists spent a lot of time in reading and studying smuggled Marxist literature, the camp was nicknamed the "University of Ekenäs".

During the 1920s and 1930s the number of captured communists varied between 100 and 600. The highest number was after the declaration of the 1930 Communist Laws. In July 1933 more than 370 prisoners went on a hunger strike and finally after 11 days, five died of force-feeding. The penitentiary was active until 1940. During World War II the prisoners were transferred to newly established prison camps around Finland and Ekenäs was used as a garrison by the Finnish Army.

== Notable inmates ==
- Aimo Aaltonen (1934–1940)
- Aleksanteri Ahola-Valo (1939–1940)
- Aarne Arvonen (1918)
- Ivar Lassy (1920–1921)
- Yrjö Leino (1935–1938)
- Toivo Hjalmar Långström (1923–1926, 1930–1934)
- Julius Nurminen (1918) †
- Robert Oksa (1918)
- Ville Pessi (1935–1940)
- Arvo Tuominen (1922–1926, 1928–1933)
- Kaarlo Uskela (1918–1919)
- Niilo Wälläri (1923–1928)
- Armas Äikiä (1927–1928, 1930–1935)
