= Jussi Kujala (politician) =

Finnish journalist and politician (1878–1919)

Kujala ca. 1910-1913

Juho (Jussi) Ernst Kujala (29 August 1878 – 1 July 1919; original surname Törnroos) was a Finnish journalist and politician, born in Pornainen. He was a member of the Parliament of Finland from 1913 to 1918, representing the Social Democratic Party of Finland (SDP). He participated in the Finnish Civil War on the Red side. After the Battle of Helsinki (11.–13.3.1918), Kujala fled northwards. He was captured by White troops in Järvenpää on 21 April 1918. In October 1918 Kujala was sentenced to death, but the sentence was commuted to 12 years in prison in January 1919. On 1 July 1919, Kujala committed suicide with a knife in the Helsinki Prison.
