= Toivo Aronen =

Finnish politician (1886–1973)

- Born: Kaarlo Toivo Aronen; June 4, 1886; Pori, Finland
- Died: 1 November 1973 (aged 87)
- Occupations: Construction worker, politician

Kaarlo Toivo Aronen (4 June 1886 – 1 November 1973) was a Finnish construction worker and politician, born in Pori. He was in prison from 1918 to 1919 for having sided with the Reds during the Finnish Civil War. He was a member of the Parliament of Finland from 1922 to 1923, representing the Socialist Workers' Party of Finland (SSTP). He was arrested in 1923 on sedition charges and was given a prison sentence. He was freed in 1928.
