= Paavo Leppänen =

Finnish politician

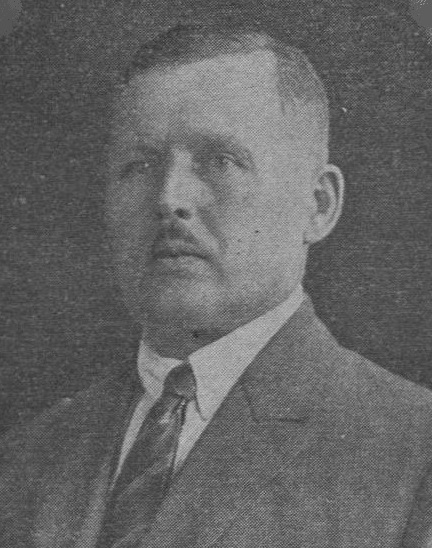
Image of Paavo Leppänen

Paavo Leppänen (3 January 1876, Eno – 1 June 1945) was a Finnish journalist and politician. He was a Member of the Parliament of Finland from 1916 to 1918, representing the Social Democratic Party of Finland (SDP). He was imprisoned in 1918 for having sided with the Reds during the Finnish Civil War.
