= Eetu Salin =

Finnish politician and journalist

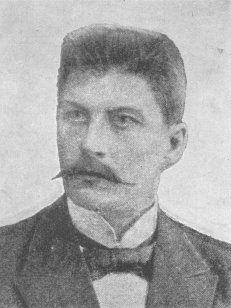
Eetu Salin

Johan Edvard (Eetu) Salin (18 March 1866 – 6 April 1919) was a Finnish shoemaker, journalist and politician, born in Asikkala. He was a member of the Parliament of Finland from 1909 to 1910 and again from 1917 to 1918, representing the Social Democratic Party of Finland (SDP). In 1918, he was sentenced to death for having sided with the Reds during the Finnish Civil War, albeit this sentence was later commuted to life in prison. Salin died in prison in Helsinki the next year. He is buried in the Hietaniemi Cemetery in Helsinki.
