= Helsinki Prison =

Prison in Helsinki, Finland

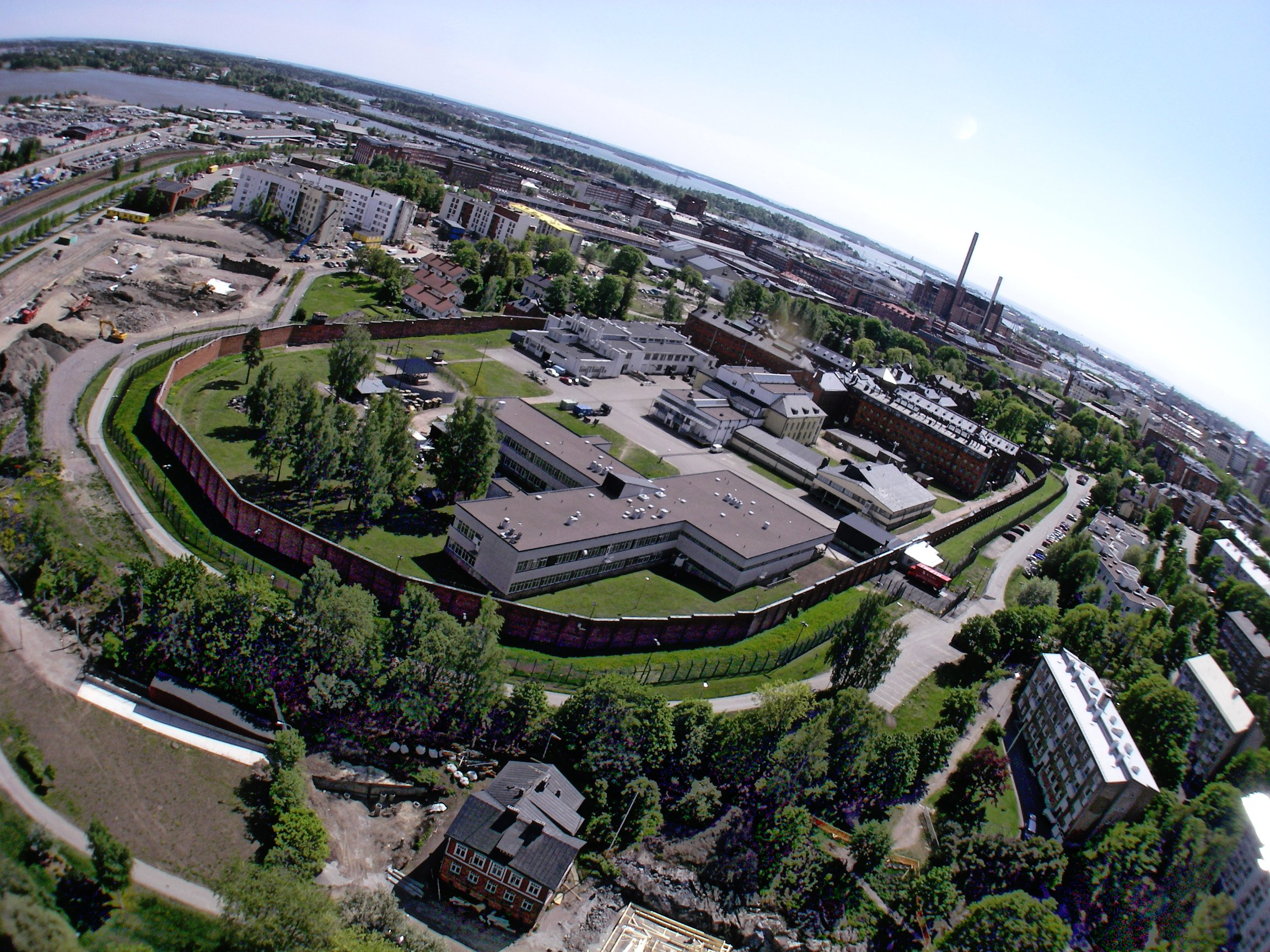
- Interactive map of Helsinki Prison
- Location: Helsinki, Finland; 60°11′41″N 24°58′10″E
- Status: Operational
- Capacity: 312
- Opened: 1881

The Helsinki Prison, also known as the Sörnäinen Prison (earlier known as Helsinki Central Prison) is a prison located in the Hermanninmäki district of Helsinki, Finland, opened in 1881. At the moment it is the only prison operating in Helsinki proper after the Katajanokka prison was converted to a hotel and its inmates transferred to a new prison in Vantaa, a suburban municipality.

== History ==
The Helsinki Central Prison, commonly known as Sörnäinen or Sörkka (Sörkan) prison, was established following a decision by the Finnish Senate in 1874. It was situated in an area that was then part of the Sörnäinen district, chosen for its excellent transportation links, access to water, and fertile soil. Construction commenced in 1875 and the initial phase was completed on November 15, 1881, featuring 100 cells, 250 dormitory cells, communal spaces, workshops, a hospital, a church, and accommodation for staff.

The prison staff comprised a director, two supervisors, five guards, an accountant, a foreman, a stoker, a doctor, and a preacher, overseeing predominantly 4-5 time offenders of the penitentiary.

Expansion and enhancement of facilities continued over the years, with the completion of eastern and western day cell blocks in 1915, and ongoing construction to facilitate work and recreational activities from 1931 to 1970. The prison's current sports and dining facilities were inaugurated in 1998, while staff residential buildings dating back to 1855-1877 were part of the establishment.

During the 1940s, post-Continuation War, the prison accommodated individuals detained for concealing weapons, adhering to a strict daily regimen. Inmates engaged in self-grooming, partook in cleaning duties, and were served a prescribed menu.

By the 1960s, the Helsinki Central Prison housed over 800 inmates, with an array of educational and recreational programs introduced to complement the penal system's rehabilitative objectives.

Throughout the 1970s, a shift towards open prison activities was evident, with reduced punitive measures and increased focus on rehabilitation and education.

In the 1980s, despite maintaining a consistent inmate population, advancements in inmate welfare and education programs were implemented, signaling a progressive approach to incarceration.

The 1990s witnessed a decline in prison populations nationwide, accompanied by an increased focus on drug rehabilitation and reintegration programs. Technological advancements and infrastructural upgrades characterized the decade, along with a noteworthy escape incident in 1993.

Renovation efforts in the 1990s modernized various prison facilities, setting the stage for comprehensive upgrades in the early 2000s. Despite initial declines, inmate populations began to rise again.

The city of Helsinki has expressed interest in redeveloping the prison site for residential use due to its central location. Discussions have taken place about closing the prison in mid-2030s. However, in 2026, Senate Properties constructed new modular cells for 120 inmates, stating that the prison could remain operational until the late 2030s before requiring further major renovations. The city has indicated that it could allocate a site for a new prison in Östersundom, but the plans remain on hold pending further action by the state.
