= Hertta Kuusinen =

Finnish politician (1904–1974)

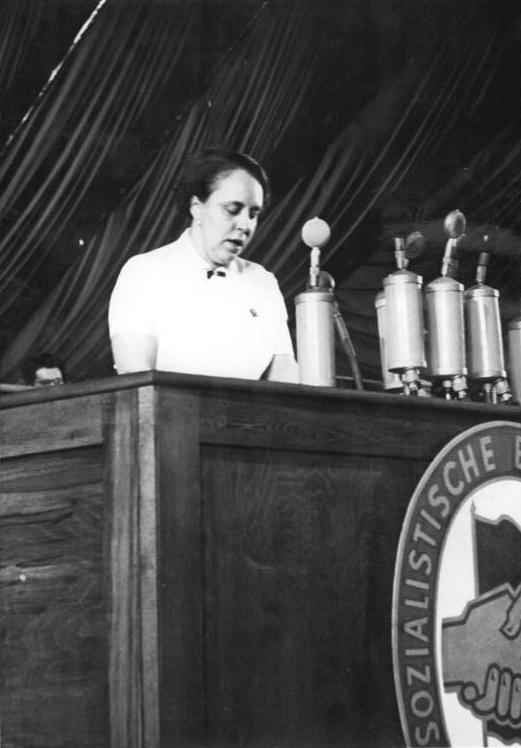
Hertta Kuusinen in East Berlin on the 3rd congress of the Socialist Unity Party of Germany (1950)

Hertta Elina Kuusinen (14 February 1904 – 18 March 1974) was a Finnish communist politician. She was a member of the central committee (1944–1971) and the political bureau of the Communist Party of Finland; member of Finland's parliament, the Eduskunta (1945–1972); general secretary (1952–1958); and leader of the parliamentary group of the Finnish People's Democratic League.

== Early life ==
Born in Luhanka on 14 February 1904, she was the daughter of Soviet politician and one-time Finnish communist leader Otto Ville Kuusinen. Hertta Kuusinen moved to the Soviet Union after her father in the 1920s. She worked for the Comintern beginning in 1922, witnessed Adolf Hitler's rise to power in Germany during 1932–1933, and taught in the International Lenin School from 1933 to 1934. Kuusinen returned to Finland in 1934 to work underground for the illegal communist party. Instead she ended up in prison for over ten years.

== Career ==
Kuusinen became known for being the leading female communist in post-war Finland. In 1948, she became only the second woman to serve as a Finnish cabinet minister.

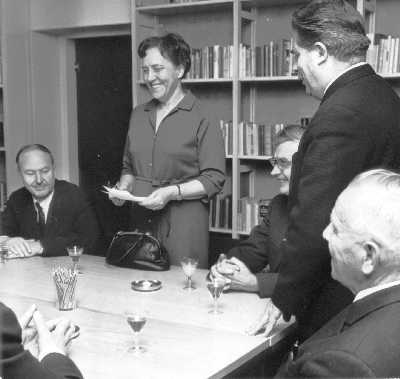
Hertta Kuusinen with Mikhail Suslov (1960)

The political climate in Finland changed after World War II. Kuusinen was released; and in the first post-war elections held in 1945, she was elected to the Eduskunta from the Finnish People's Democratic League (SKDL) list. She was General Secretary of the SKDL from 1952 to 1958, when the SKDL became the largest party in the Eduskunta with 50 of 200 seats. She was a member of Parliament until 1972, and also held the record in personal votes (58 770 / 1948) received in parliamentary elections that stood until the 2007 election. Between 1969 and 1974, Kuusinen served as the chairperson of the Women's International Democratic Federation.

== Personal life ==
Kuusinen was married to communist politicians Tuure Lehén (1923–1933) and Yrjö Leino (1945–1950).

== Death ==
She died in Moscow on 18 March 1974, aged 70.
