= Toivo Hjalmar Långström =

Finnish politician (1889–1983)

Toivo Hjalmar Långström (1889 in Helsinki – 1983) was a Finnish politician and trade union activist. He was elected to the Parliament of Finland in the 1922 election, and was the last leader of Socialist Workers' Party of Finland from May to August 1923 before the party was banned and its leadership imprisoned. Långström was in jail at the Tammisaari prison camp for political reasons between 1930 and 1934 and during Finland's 1941-1944 Continuation War against the Soviet Union, Långström was also active in the Communist Party of Finland and (later) the Finnish People's Democratic League.
