= Arvo Tuominen =

Finnish communist revolutionary (1894–1981)

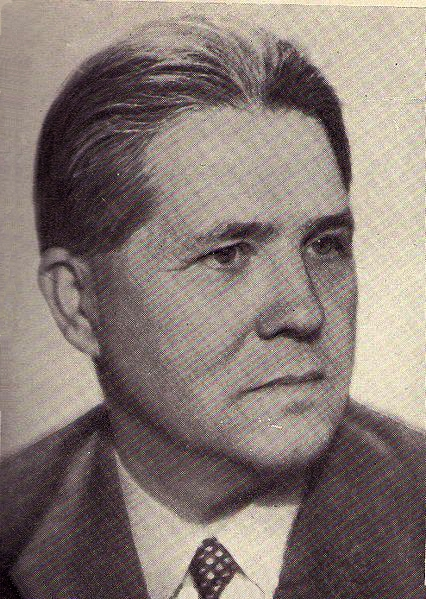
Tuominen in the 1950s

Arvo "Poika" Tuominen (5 September 1894 – 27 May 1981) was a Finnish communist revolutionary and later a social democratic journalist, politician and author. He was given his nickname Poika (Finnish for 'Boy') in 1920 because of his boyish look.

== Life ==
Tuominen was born in 1894 in Kuotila to the family of a rural carpenter. In 1912 he moved to Tampere to become a carpenter's apprentice and enrolled in the Workers' Institute, joining an affiliated club called the Saturday Society, where he began to follow world politics. Tuominen began reporting to the social democratic Kansan Lehti (People's News), rising to editor-in-chief by March 1918 in the midst of the Finnish Civil War. He was arrested by the White Guards, eventually freed to enlist in the Finnish army. Discharged in late autumn 1918, Tuominen took up carpentry again, but came under the influence of Otto Wille Kuusinen and the Communist Party of Finland. Tuominen then formed the Finnish Socialist Labor party and began publishing the daily newspaper Sumen Työmies (The Finnish Worker). In June 1921 he joined Kuusinen and Yrjö Sirola in attending the 3rd World Congress of the Communist International, as a member of the Executive Committee. Tuominen met Lenin there, stating "Lenin proceeded from entirely different fundamentals than Stalin; namely, that the dictatorship of the proletariat should be applied to enemies and opponents and not to one's own comrades. He provoked discussion and debate among those around him, whereas Stalin tolerated only his own opinions, which were final."

Tuominen became a member of Finnish Communist Party's Central Committee and the director of the Finnish bureau. Yet, Tuominen had doubts about the Comintern based in Moscow, "Whose bread you eat, his songs you sing." Though he had faith in Lenin and the ultimate triumph of communism, Tuominen had difficulty accepting "Everything that you do for the good of the Soviet Union and communism is acceptable, hence morally right."

On 26 January 1922, Tuominen was arrested after publishing a proclamation stating Finnish workers should support the Soviet Union during the East Karelian uprising. He was released four years later. By then Tuominen realized "the Soviet Union was not the fatherland of all workers," but only promoting the interests of Russia as a world power.

In the spring of 1926, Tuominen was released from Turku Prison, and married Lyyli Kyllikki Rainio, remaining so until her death in 1968.

Tuominen was elected secretary of the Finnish Federation of Trade Unions, and since he maintained ties with the Soviet Union and the Finnish Communist Party, he was arrested again in April 1928. In 1932, he was paroled upon which he traveled to Moscow on Kuusinen's invitation. After attending the May Day parade, Tuominen was sent to the Frunze Sanatorium in Sochi to recover from his time in prison. Along the way he witnessed the effects of the Soviet Famine and the bezprizornye.

In the spring of 1934, Tuominen graduated from the International Lenin School, and became secretary general of the Finnish Communist Party. He later became a member of the Comintern Presidium, and lectured at the school from the fall of 1934 until 1936. According to Tuominen, "When the Red Army attacked Finland in 1939, there were 250 saboteurs in the country, all trained in Soviet schools. Since I was still secretary general of the Finnish Communist party, they were at my disposal. I could have told them to blow up bridges, blow up factories, do this and that. But I told them just opposite, that no one was to do anything like that; rather, that the country must be defended. There was, in fact, no sabotage in Finland during the Winter War."

On 6 November 1935, Tuominen engaged Stalin in conversation for the first time, discussing Tampere, where Stalin met Lenin in 1905. Tuominen witnessed the Grigory Zinoviev and Lev Kamenev case during the Moscow trials. According to Tuominen, "Naturally, that Stalinist terror affected me devastatingly, as it did my wife and many other Finns. Already in the years 1936-38 all the foreign Communists who had made their way to the Soviet Union had the feeling that they were completely at the mercy of the GPU."

In 1937, Tuominen asked Kuusinen for a transfer to Stockholm to carry on party work more effectively, and was able to receive an exit permit along with his wife. In 1938 they were granted Swedish foreigners' residency permits, which enable him to carry on work as it related to the Finnish Communist party, as long as it did not interfere in Swedish politics.

In 1939, Tuominen refused to become prime minister of the Terijoki government, stating "Finnish workers must defend Finland when it is attacked regardless of the attacker. The aggressor was the Red Army, and Finland was defending its independence."

Kimmo Rentola notes that during the Winter War, Tuominen refused to travel to Moscow in November 1939, but "...took part in organizing the Swedish communists' support activities in northern Sweden. These were connected in the Red Army's plan to cut Finland in two." However, as the Soviet advance halted, and the Kuusinen government enjoyed little support, Tuominen contacted Finnish Social Democrats in Stockholm. On 16 February 1940, Tuominen's critical views of the Soviets were published in Helsinki newspapers. After 6 May 1940, Tuominen's two anti-Comintern letters were published.

In 1956, Tuominen returned to Finland and published three books, Sirpin ja vasaran tie (The Way of the Hammer and Sickle) in 1956, Kremlin kellot (The Bells of Kremlin) in 1956, and Maan alla ja päällä (Underground and Above) in 1958.

Tuominen died in Tampere in 1981. He was the last surviving former member of the Comintern Presidium.
