= Häme (parliamentary electoral district) =

Electoral district of the Parliament of Finland

- Tavastland
- Electoral District for the Parliament of Finland
- Location of Häme within Finland
- Municipality: List: Asikkala; Forssa; Hämeenlinna; Hartola; Hattula; Hausjärvi; Heinola; Hollola; Humppila; Iitti; Janakkala; Jokioinen; Kärkölä; Lahti; Loppi; Orimattila; Padasjoki; Riihimäki; Sysmä; Tammela; Ypäjä
- Region: Kanta-Häme; Päijät-Häme
- Population: 374,139 (2022)
- Electorate: 310,047 (2023)
- Area: 12,649 km^{2} (2022)

Current Electoral District
- Created: 1907
- Seats: List: 14 (2003–present); 13 (1991–2003); 15 (1972–1991); 14 (1951–1972); 11 (1907–1951)
- Members of Parliament: List: Tarja Filatov (SDP); Sanni Grahn-Laasonen (Kok); Timo Heinonen (Kok); Mika Kari (SDP); Hilkka Kemppi (Kesk); Teemu Kinnari (Kok); Johannes Koskinen (SDP); Rami Lehtinen (PS); Mira Nieminen (PS); Aino-Kaisa Pekonen (Vas); Lulu Ranne (PS); Päivi Räsänen (KD); Jari Ronkainen (PS); Ville Skinnari (SDP)

Häme (Swedish: Tavastland; also known as Tavastia) is one of the 13 electoral districts of the Parliament of Finland, the national legislature of Finland. The district was established as Häme Province South (Finnish: Hämeen läänin eteläinen vaalipiiri; Swedish: Tavastehus läns södra valkrets) in 1907 when the Diet of Finland was replaced by the Parliament of Finland. It was renamed Häme in 1997. It is conterminous with the regions of Kanta-Häme and Päijät-Häme. The district currently elects 14 of the 200 members of the Parliament of Finland using the open party-list proportional representation electoral system. At the 2023 parliamentary election it had 310,047 registered electors.

== History ==
Häme Province South was one 16 electoral districts established by the Election Act of the Grand Duchy of Finland (Suomen Suuriruhtinaanmaan Vaalilaki) passed by the Diet of Finland in 1906. It consisted of the hundreds (kihlakunta) of Hauho, Hollola and Tammela in the province of Häme. Viiala municipality was transferred from Häme Province North to Häme Province South in 1951. In 1990, the municipalities of Kylmäkoski, Toijala, Valkeakoski and Viiala were transferred from Häme Province South to Häme Province North and Somero municipality was transferred from Häme Province South to Turku Province South. The district was renamed Häme in 1997.

In 1998, the municipalities of Hartola, Heinola and Sysmä were transferred from Mikkeli to Häme and the municipalities of Artjärvi and Orimattila were transferred from Uusimaa to Häme. At the same time, Urjala municipality was transferred from Häme to Pirkanmaa. Iitti municipality was transferred from Southeast Finland to Häme in 2021.

== Electoral system ==
Häme currently elects 14 of the 200 members of the Parliament of Finland using the open party-list proportional representation electoral system. Parties may form electoral alliances with each other to pool their votes and increase their chances of winning seats. However, the number of candidates nominated by an electoral alliance may not exceed the maximum number of candidates that a single party may nominate. Seats are allocated using the D'Hondt method.

== Election results ==
=== Summary ===
Election	Left Alliance Vas / SKDL / STPV / SSTP			Green League Vihr			Social Democrats SDP / SDTP / SDP			Swedish People's SFP			Centre Kesk / ML			Liberals Lib / LKP / SK / KE / NP			National Coalition Kok / SP			Christian Democrats KD / SKL			Finns PS / SMP / SPP		
Election	Votes	%	Seats	Votes	%	Seats	Votes	%	Seats	Votes	%	Seats	Votes	%	Seats	Votes	%	Seats	Votes	%	Seats	Votes	%	Seats	Votes	%	Seats
2023	12,171	5.87%	1	9,818	4.74%	0	49,137	23.71%	4	559	0.27%	0	17,902	8.64%	1				44,555	21.50%	3	11,444	5.52%	1	50,611	24.42%	4
2019	15,172	7.37%	1	17,354	8.43%	1	49,359	23.99%	4	500	0.24%	0	20,892	10.15%	1				39,511	19.20%	3	11,733	5.70%	1	43,199	21.00%	3
2015	12,182	6.02%	1	10,350	5.11%	0	44,737	22.10%	3				36,020	17.79%	3				43,544	21.51%	3	12,412	6.13%	1	39,537	19.53%	3
2011	13,938	6.88%	1	9,165	4.52%	0	48,763	24.06%	4				26,819	13.23%	2				45,518	22.46%	3	13,702	6.76%	1	41,820	20.63%	3
2007	15,745	8.33%	1	11,628	6.15%	1	52,902	27.97%	4				38,383	20.30%	3	174	0.09%	0	46,708	24.70%	4	14,576	7.71%	1	4,182	2.21%	0
2003	16,760	8.87%	1	11,416	6.04%	1	60,289	31.92%	5				34,759	18.41%	3	504	0.27%	0	41,137	21.78%	3	18,425	9.76%	1	918	0.49%	0
1999	14,662	8.93%	1	10,282	6.26%	1	46,532	28.35%	4				27,648	16.84%	2	183	0.11%	0	43,139	26.28%	4	14,408	8.78%	1	273	0.17%	0
1995	16,632	9.38%	1	10,537	5.94%	0	60,608	34.19%	5				25,442	14.35%	2	531	0.30%	0	47,135	26.59%	4	7,614	4.29%	1	1,004	0.57%	0
1991	15,038	8.75%	1	13,150	7.65%	1	48,172	28.02%	4				32,921	19.15%	3	348	0.20%	0	45,871	26.68%	4	7,000	4.07%	0	6,071	3.53%	0
1987	18,930	8.88%	1	7,860	3.69%	0	64,943	30.47%	6	351	0.16%	0	25,703	12.06%	2	962	0.45%	0	64,766	30.38%	6	8,314	3.90%	0	9,639	4.52%	0
1983	26,586	11.91%	2	3,384	1.52%	0	74,581	33.42%	5	399	0.18%	0	25,807	11.56%	2				63,073	28.26%	5	7,695	3.45%	0	21,671	9.71%	1
1979	33,620	15.44%	2				65,885	30.25%	5				25,477	11.70%	2	5,951	2.73%	0	62,010	28.47%	5	13,768	6.32%	1	8,678	3.98%	0
1975	36,204	17.57%	3				62,923	30.54%	5				25,999	12.62%	2	6,785	3.29%	0	51,331	24.92%	4	9,848	4.78%	1	7,168	3.48%	0
1972	31,680	16.44%	3				61,523	31.92%	5				23,041	11.96%	2	9,409	4.88%	0	44,602	23.14%	4	5,092	2.64%	0	14,518	7.53%	1
1970	29,107	15.54%	2				54,828	29.28%	5				24,280	12.96%	2	10,337	5.52%	0	46,644	24.91%	4	3,115	1.66%	0	15,933	8.51%	1
1966	33,942	19.61%	2				56,169	32.45%	5				28,216	16.30%	2	13,441	7.76%	1	32,432	18.74%	3	1,317	0.76%	0	856	0.49%	0
1962	33,545	20.00%	3				42,587	25.39%	4				31,094	18.54%	3	10,846	6.47%	1	34,268	20.43%	3				1,574	0.94%	0
1958	29,071	20.48%	3				35,845	25.25%	4				26,424	18.61%	2	11,476	8.08%	1	27,902	19.65%	3						
1954	28,844	19.79%	3				47,588	32.65%	5				28,272	19.40%	3	16,967	11.64%	1	23,573	16.17%	2						
1951	26,656	20.21%	3				44,148	33.47%	5				24,941	18.91%	2	10,248	7.77%	1	25,389	19.25%	3						
1948	23,551	20.86%	2				38,306	33.93%	4				16,836	14.91%	2	7,465	6.61%	0	25,460	22.55%	3						
1945	25,985	25.49%	3				32,546	31.93%	4				13,297	13.05%	1	8,845	8.68%	1	19,849	19.47%	2						
1939							38,177	50.72%	6				7,993	10.62%	1	4,927	6.55%	1	11,261	14.96%	2						
1936							34,860	51.13%	6				7,416	10.88%	1	6,590	9.67%	1	7,489	10.99%	1						
1933							33,906	49.37%	6				7,875	11.47%	1	8,316	12.11%	1	16,178	23.56%	3						
1930							31,305	47.80%	5				9,204	14.05%	1	5,612	8.57%	1	17,517	26.74%	4						
1929	6,947	12.05%	1				24,043	41.69%	5				8,066	13.99%	2	5,380	9.33%	1	12,036	20.87%	2						
1927	5,989	10.66%	1				24,741	44.03%	5				6,704	11.93%	1	5,698	10.14%	1	12,980	23.10%	3						
1924	4,487	8.07%	1				24,348	43.79%	5				7,492	13.47%	1	5,651	10.16%	1	13,557	24.38%	3						
1922	6,137	11.29%	1				22,584	41.55%	5				4,995	9.19%	1	7,005	12.89%	1	13,599	25.02%	3						
1919							28,121	50.26%	6				1,213	2.17%	0	11,736	20.98%	3	13,439	24.02%	2						
1917							38,574	60.97%	7										22,496	35.56%	4						
1916							32,663	63.16%	8							6,514	12.60%	1	11,323	21.90%	2						
1913							29,167	60.59%	7							6,102	12.68%	2	11,082	23.02%	2						
1911							29,921	59.40%	7							6,952	13.80%	1	12,138	24.10%	3						
1910							29,676	58.88%	7							7,048	13.98%	1	12,498	24.80%	3						
1909							30,351	57.36%	7							6,799	12.85%	1	14,165	26.77%	3						
1908							30,451	57.97%	7				115	0.22%	0	6,669	12.70%	1	13,787	26.25%	3						
1907							32,923	57.63%	7							6,089	10.66%	1	15,706	27.49%	3						

(Figures in italics represent joint lists.)

=== Detailed ===
==== 2020s ====
===== 2023 =====
Results of the 2023 parliamentary election held on 2 April 2023:

Party		Party			Electoral Alliance		
Party		Votes	%	Seats	Votes	%	Seats
Finns Party	PS	50,611	24.42%	4	50,611	24.42%	4
Social Democratic Party of Finland	SDP	49,137	23.71%	4	49,137	23.71%	4
National Coalition Party	Kok	44,555	21.50%	3	44,555	21.50%	3
Centre Party	Kesk	17,902	8.64%	1	17,902	8.64%	1
Left Alliance	Vas	12,171	5.87%	1	12,171	5.87%	1
Christian Democrats	KD	11,444	5.52%	1	11,444	5.52%	1
Green League	Vihr	9,818	4.74%	0	9,818	4.74%	0
Movement Now	Liik	6,500	3.14%	0	6,500	3.14%	0
Freedom Alliance	VL	1,444	0.70%	0	2,544	1.23%	0
Finnish People First	SKE	612	0.30%	0	2,544	1.23%	0
Crystal Party	KRIP	488	0.24%	0	2,544	1.23%	0
Liberal Party – Freedom to Choose	Lib	798	0.39%	0	798	0.39%	0
Power Belongs to the People	VKK	579	0.28%	0	579	0.28%	0
Swedish People's Party of Finland	SFP	559	0.27%	0	559	0.27%	0
Animal Justice Party of Finland	EOP	432	0.21%	0	432	0.21%	0
Communist Party of Finland	SKP	117	0.06%	0	117	0.06%	0
Pirate Party	Pir	99	0.05%	0	99	0.05%	0
Valid votes		207,266	100.00%	14	207,266	100.00%	14
Rejected votes		1,381	0.66%				
Total polled		208,647	67.30%				
Registered electors		310,047					

The following candidates were elected: Tarja Filatov (SDP), 6,973 votes; Sanni Grahn-Laasonen (Kok), 7,003 votes; Timo Heinonen (Kok), 7,402 votes; Mika Kari (SDP), 6,090 votes; Hilkka Kemppi (Kesk), 5,312 votes; Teemu Kinnari (Kok), 7,366 votes; Johannes Koskinen (SDP), 5,009 votes; Rami Lehtinen (PS), 5,636 votes; Mira Nieminen (PS), 5,388 votes; Aino-Kaisa Pekonen (Vas), 4,251 votes; Lulu Ranne (PS), 10,665 votes; Päivi Räsänen (KD), 6,968 votes; Jari Ronkainen (PS), 4,820 votes; and Ville Skinnari (SDP), 5,983 votes.

==== 2010s ====
===== 2019 =====
Results of the 2019 parliamentary election held on 14 April 2019:

Party		Party			Electoral Alliance		
Party		Votes	%	Seats	Votes	%	Seats
Social Democratic Party of Finland	SDP	49,359	23.99%	4	49,359	23.99%	4
Finns Party	PS	43,199	21.00%	3	43,199	21.00%	3
National Coalition Party	Kok	39,511	19.20%	3	39,511	19.20%	3
Centre Party	Kesk	20,892	10.15%	1	20,892	10.15%	1
Green League	Vihr	17,354	8.43%	1	17,354	8.43%	1
Left Alliance	Vas	15,172	7.37%	1	15,172	7.37%	1
Christian Democrats	KD	11,733	5.70%	1	11,733	5.70%	1
Movement Now	Liik	3,312	1.61%	0	3,312	1.61%	0
Pirate Party	Pir	996	0.48%	0	1,319	0.64%	0
Liberal Party – Freedom to Choose	Lib	323	0.16%	0	1,319	0.64%	0
Seven Star Movement	TL	1,028	0.50%	0	1,028	0.50%	0
Blue Reform	SIN	821	0.40%	0	821	0.40%	0
Swedish People's Party of Finland	SFP	500	0.24%	0	500	0.24%	0
Finnish People First	SKE	324	0.16%	0	405	0.20%	0
Citizens' Party	KP	81	0.04%	0	405	0.20%	0
Commonwealth		344	0.17%	0	344	0.17%	0
Reform		342	0.17%	0	342	0.17%	0
Communist Workers' Party – For Peace and Socialism	KTP	195	0.09%	0	195	0.09%	0
Feminist Party	FP	165	0.08%	0	165	0.08%	0
Jaana and Leo		87	0.04%	0	87	0.04%	0
Valid votes		205,738	100.00%	14	205,738	100.00%	14
Rejected votes		1,655	0.80%				
Total polled		207,393	67.79%				
Registered electors		305,915					

The following candidates were elected: Tarja Filatov (SDP), 7,213 votes; Sanni Grahn-Laasonen (Kok), 7,419 votes; Timo Heinonen (Kok), 5,629 votes; Kalle Jokinen (Kok), 5,934 votes; Mika Kari (SDP), 5,676 votes; Hilkka Kemppi (Kesk), 3,600 votes; Johannes Koskinen (SDP), 5,717 votes; Rami Lehto (PS), 7,297 votes; Aino-Kaisa Pekonen (Vas), 6,872 votes; Lulu Ranne (PS), 7,812 votes; Päivi Räsänen (KD), 6,616 votes; Jari Ronkainen (PS), 6,038 votes; Ville Skinnari (SDP), 8,319 votes; and Mirka Soinikoski (Vihr), 2,320 votes.

===== 2015 =====
Results of the 2015 parliamentary election held on 19 April 2015:

Party		Votes	%	Seats
Social Democratic Party of Finland	SDP	44,737	22.10%	3
National Coalition Party	Kok	43,544	21.51%	3
True Finns	PS	39,537	19.53%	3
Centre Party	Kesk	36,020	17.79%	3
Christian Democrats	KD	12,412	6.13%	1
Left Alliance	Vas	12,182	6.02%	1
Green League	Vihr	10,350	5.11%	0
Pirate Party	Pir	1,658	0.82%	0
Independence Party	IPU	742	0.37%	0
Change 2011		632	0.31%	0
Communist Party of Finland	SKP	489	0.24%	0
Communist Workers' Party – For Peace and Socialism	KTP	143	0.07%	0
Valid votes		202,446	100.00%	14
Rejected votes		1,319	0.65%	
Total polled		203,765	66.09%	
Registered electors		308,319		

The following candidates were elected: Sirkka-Liisa Anttila (Kesk), 5,200 votes; Tarja Filatov (SDP), 8,318 votes; Sanni Grahn-Laasonen (Kok), 7,556 votes; Timo Heinonen (Kok), 6,274 votes; Kalle Jokinen (Kok), 5,728 votes; Mika Kari (SDP), 6,867 votes; Rami Lehto (PS), 6,705 votes; Anne Louhelainen (PS), 6,743 votes; Aino-Kaisa Pekonen (Vas), 5,487 votes; Päivi Räsänen (KD), 7,545 votes; Juha Rehula (Kesk), 6,429 votes; Jari Ronkainen (PS), 4,442 votes; Ville Skinnari (SDP), 5,711 votes; and Martti Talja (Kesk), 3,941 votes.

===== 2011 =====
Results of the 2011 parliamentary election held on 17 April 2011:

Party		Votes	%	Seats
Social Democratic Party of Finland	SDP	48,763	24.06%	4
National Coalition Party	Kok	45,518	22.46%	3
True Finns	PS	41,820	20.63%	3
Centre Party	Kesk	26,819	13.23%	2
Left Alliance	Vas	13,938	6.88%	1
Christian Democrats	KD	13,702	6.76%	1
Green League	Vihr	9,165	4.52%	0
Pirate Party	Pir	1,074	0.53%	0
Communist Party of Finland	SKP	704	0.35%	0
Change 2011		375	0.19%	0
Senior Citizens' Party		336	0.17%	0
Communist Workers' Party – For Peace and Socialism	KTP	159	0.08%	0
Freedom Party – Finland's Future	VP	105	0.05%	0
Independence Party	IPU	80	0.04%	0
Workers' Party of Finland	STP	70	0.03%	0
Kari Valjakka (Independent)		61	0.03%	0
Valid votes		202,689	100.00%	14
Rejected votes		1,680	0.82%	
Total polled		204,369	66.74%	
Registered electors		306,200		

The following candidates were elected: Sirkka-Liisa Anttila (Kesk), 5,882 votes; Tarja Filatov (SDP), 6,782 votes; Sanni Grahn-Laasonen (Kok), 5,866 votes; Timo Heinonen (Kok), 6,526 votes; James Hirvisaari (PS), 5,498 votes; Kalle Jokinen (Kok), 5,271 votes; Mika Kari (SDP), 5,280 votes; Johannes Koskinen (SDP), 7,603 votes; Anne Louhelainen (PS), 6,160 votes; Aino-Kaisa Pekonen (Vas), 4,010 votes; Päivi Räsänen (KD), 6,995 votes; Juha Rehula (Kesk), 5,550 votes; Jouko Skinnari (SDP), 5,186 votes; and Ismo Soukola (PS), 5,059 vots.

==== 2000s ====
===== 2007 =====
Results of the 2007 parliamentary election held on 18 March 2007:

Party		Votes	%	Seats
Social Democratic Party of Finland	SDP	52,902	27.97%	4
National Coalition Party	Kok	46,708	24.70%	4
Centre Party	Kesk	38,383	20.30%	3
Left Alliance	Vas	15,745	8.33%	1
Christian Democrats	KD	14,576	7.71%	1
Green League	Vihr	11,628	6.15%	1
True Finns	PS	4,182	2.21%	0
Pensioners for People		2,723	1.44%	0
Communist Party of Finland	SKP	1,185	0.63%	0
Independence Party	IPU	215	0.11%	0
Workers' Party of Finland	STP	175	0.09%	0
Liberals	Lib	174	0.09%	0
Finnish People's Blue-Whites	SKS	153	0.08%	0
Kai Aaltonen (Independent)		145	0.08%	0
Communist Workers' Party – For Peace and Socialism	KTP	124	0.07%	0
Joint Responsibility Party		95	0.05%	0
Valid votes		189,113	100.00%	14
Rejected votes		1,587	0.83%	
Total polled		190,700	63.87%	
Registered electors		298,555		

The following candidates were elected: Sirkka-Liisa Anttila (Kesk), 6,880 votes; Risto Autio (Kesk), 4,998 votes; Tarja Filatov (SDP), 5,696 votes; Timo Heinonen (Kok), 4,524 votes; Matti Kauppila (Vas), 3,468 votes; Jari Koskinen (Kok), 7,309 votes; Johannes Koskinen (SDP), 9,056 votes; Tuija Nurmi (Kok), 6,749 votes; Kirsi Ojansuu (Vihr), 3,405 votes; Päivi Räsänen (KD), 8,053 votes; Juha Rehula (Kesk), 4,549 votes; Jouko Skinnari (SDP), 5,565 votes; Satu Taiveaho (SDP), 6,760 votes; and Ilkka Viljanen (Kok), 6,303 votes.

===== 2003 =====
Results of the 2003 parliamentary election held on 16 March 2003:

Party		Party			Electoral Alliance		
Party		Votes	%	Seats	Votes	%	Seats
Social Democratic Party of Finland	SDP	60,289	31.92%	5	60,289	31.92%	5
National Coalition Party	Kok	41,137	21.78%	3	41,137	21.78%	3
Centre Party	Kesk	34,759	18.41%	3	34,759	18.41%	3
Christian Democrats	KD	18,425	9.76%	1	18,425	9.76%	1
Left Alliance	Vas	16,760	8.87%	1	16,760	8.87%	1
Green League	Vihr	11,416	6.04%	1	11,416	6.04%	1
Communist Party of Finland	SKP	1,545	0.82%	0	1,545	0.82%	0
True Finns	PS	918	0.49%	0	1,422	0.75%	0
Liberals	Lib	504	0.27%	0	1,422	0.75%	0
Pensioners for People		1,069	0.57%	0	1,069	0.57%	0
Finland Rises – People Unites		749	0.40%	0	749	0.40%	0
Forces for Change in Finland		498	0.26%	0	498	0.26%	0
Päivi Oksanen (Independent)		269	0.14%	0	269	0.14%	0
Communist Workers' Party – For Peace and Socialism	KTP	260	0.14%	0	260	0.14%	0
Taito Rinteelä (Independent)		256	0.14%	0	256	0.14%	0
Valid votes		188,854	100.00%	14	188,854	100.00%	14
Rejected votes		2,008	1.05%				
Total polled		190,862	65.06%				
Registered electors		293,343					

The following candidates were elected: Sirkka-Liisa Anttila (Kesk), 10,656 votes; Tarja Filatov (SDP), 7,896 votes; Matti Kauppila (Vas), 3,749 votes; Jari Koskinen (Kok), 6,037 votes; Johannes Koskinen (SDP), 12,135 votes; Maija-Liisa Lindqvist (Kesk), 4,348 votes; Minna Lintonen (SDP), 4,719 votes; Tuija Nurmi (Kok), 6,220 votes; Kirsi Ojansuu (Vihr), 3,328 votes; Päivi Räsänen (KD), 8,976 votes; Juha Rehula (Kesk), 5,428 votes; Timo Seppälä (Kok), 4,667 votes; Jouko Skinnari (SDP), 6,997 votes; and Satu Taiveaho (SDP), 4,903 votes.

==== 1990s ====
===== 1999 =====
Results of the 1999 parliamentary election held on 21 March 1999:

Party		Party			Electoral Alliance		
Party		Votes	%	Seats	Votes	%	Seats
Social Democratic Party of Finland	SDP	46,532	28.35%	4	46,532	28.35%	4
National Coalition Party	Kok	43,139	26.28%	4	43,139	26.28%	4
Centre Party	Kesk	27,648	16.84%	2	27,648	16.84%	2
Finnish Christian League	SKL	14,408	8.78%	1	16,175	9.85%	1
Reform Group	Rem	1,286	0.78%	0	16,175	9.85%	1
True Finns	PS	273	0.17%	0	16,175	9.85%	1
Alliance for Free Finland	VSL	208	0.13%	0	16,175	9.85%	1
Left Alliance	Vas	14,662	8.93%	1	14,662	8.93%	1
Green League	Vihr	10,282	6.26%	1	10,282	6.26%	1
Pensioners for People	EKA	1,740	1.06%	0	2,683	1.63%	0
Young Finns	Nuors	760	0.46%	0	2,683	1.63%	0
Liberal People's Party	LKP	183	0.11%	0	2,683	1.63%	0
Communist Party of Finland	SKP	1,102	0.67%	0	1,340	0.82%	0
Kirjava ”Puolue” – Elonkehän Puolesta	KIPU	238	0.14%	0	1,340	0.82%	0
Finland: Non-EU Joint List		607	0.37%	0	607	0.37%	0
Taito Rinteelä (Independent)		503	0.31%	0	503	0.31%	0
Communist Workers' Party – For Peace and Socialism	KTP	308	0.19%	0	308	0.19%	0
Natural Law Party	LLP	219	0.13%	0	219	0.13%	0
Pauli Lella (Independent)		61	0.04%	0	61	0.04%	0
Valid votes		164,159	100.00%	13	164,159	100.00%	13
Rejected votes		2,054	1.24%				
Total polled		166,213	64.55%				
Registered electors		257,497					

The following candidates were elected: Sirkka-Liisa Anttila (Kesk), 10,973 votes; Tarja Filatov (SDP), 5,500 votes; Esko Helle (Vas), 4,082 votes; Ulla Juurola (SDP), 4,906 votes; Jari Koskinen (Kok), 4,842 votes; Johannes Koskinen (SDP), 9,434 votes; Tuija Nurmi (Kok), 4,424 votes; Kirsi Ojansuu (Vihr), 3,047 votes; Sirpa Pietikäinen (Kok), 7,211 votes; Päivi Räsänen (KD), 11,407 votes; Juha Rehula (Kesk), 3,452 votes; Timo Seppälä (Kok), 3,827 votes; and Jouko Skinnari (SDP), 9,237 votes.

===== 1995 =====
Results of the 1995 parliamentary election held on 19 March 1995:

Party		Party			Electoral Alliance		
Party		Votes	%	Seats	Votes	%	Seats
Social Democratic Party of Finland	SDP	60,608	34.19%	5	60,608	34.19%	5
National Coalition Party	Kok	47,135	26.59%	4	47,135	26.59%	4
Centre Party	Kesk	25,442	14.35%	2	25,442	14.35%	2
Left Alliance	Vas	16,632	9.38%	1	16,632	9.38%	1
Finnish Christian League	SKL	7,614	4.29%	1	11,180	6.31%	1
Pensioners for People	ELKA	1,680	0.95%	0	11,180	6.31%	1
Finnish Rural Party	SMP	1,004	0.57%	0	11,180	6.31%	1
Liberal People's Party	LKP	531	0.30%	0	11,180	6.31%	1
Women's Party	NAISP	270	0.15%	0	11,180	6.31%	1
Ecological Party the Greens	EKO	81	0.05%	0	11,180	6.31%	1
Green League	Vihr	10,537	5.94%	0	10,537	5.94%	0
Young Finns	Nuor	3,358	1.89%	0	3,358	1.89%	0
Alliance for Free Finland	VSL	1,229	0.69%	0	1,229	0.69%	0
Natural Law Party	LLP	403	0.23%	0	403	0.23%	0
Pensioners' Party	SEP	398	0.22%	0	398	0.22%	0
Communist Workers' Party – For Peace and Socialism	KTP	236	0.13%	0	236	0.13%	0
Joint Responsibility Party	YYP	124	0.07%	0	124	0.07%	0
Valid votes		177,282	100.00%	13	177,282	100.00%	13
Rejected votes		1,635	0.91%				
Total polled		178,917	69.64%				
Registered electors		256,915					

The following candidates were elected: Sirkka-Liisa Anttila (Kesk), 13,731 votes; Tarja Filatov (SDP), 5,642 votes; Esko Helle (Vas), 4,827 votes; Ilkka Joenpalo (SDP), 5,781 votes; Ulla Juurola (SDP), 5,614 votes; Johannes Koskinen (SDP), 10,625 votes; Maija-Liisa Lindqvist (Kesk), 3,159 votes; Tuija Nurmi (Kok), 4,308 votes; Sirpa Pietikäinen (Kok), 11,148 votes; Päivi Räsänen (SKL), 5,974 votes; Väinö Saario (Kok), 4,786 votes; Jouko Skinnari (SDP), 9,216 votes; and Iiro Viinanen (Kok), 15,647 votes.

===== 1991 =====
Results of the 1991 parliamentary election held on 17 March 1991:

Party		Party			Electoral Alliance		
Party		Votes	%	Seats	Votes	%	Seats
Social Democratic Party of Finland	SDP	48,172	28.02%	4	48,172	28.02%	4
National Coalition Party	Kok	45,871	26.68%	4	45,871	26.68%	4
Centre Party	Kesk	32,921	19.15%	3	32,921	19.15%	3
Left Alliance	Vas	15,038	8.75%	1	15,038	8.75%	1
Green League	Vihr	13,150	7.65%	1	13,150	7.65%	1
Finnish Rural Party	SMP	6,071	3.53%	0	8,242	4.79%	0
Independent Non-Aligned Pensioners	ELKA	1,823	1.06%	0	8,242	4.79%	0
Liberal People's Party	LKP	348	0.20%	0	8,242	4.79%	0
Finnish Christian League	SKL	7,000	4.07%	0	7,720	4.49%	0
Pensioners' Party	SEP	720	0.42%	0	7,720	4.49%	0
Women's Party	NAISL	399	0.23%	0	399	0.23%	0
Communist Workers' Party – For Peace and Socialism	KTP	293	0.17%	0	293	0.17%	0
Humanity Party		95	0.06%	0	95	0.06%	0
Valid votes		171,901	100.00%	13	171,901	100.00%	13
Blank votes		2,093	1.19%				
Rejected Votess – Other		1,650	0.94%				
Total polled		175,644	68.79%				
Registered electors		255,338					

The following candidates were elected: Sirkka-Liisa Anttila (Kesk), 10,167 votes; Esko Helle (Vas), 5,193 votes; Johannes Koskinen (SDP), 6,360 votes; Maija-Liisa Lindqvist (Kesk), 5,939 votes; Matti Luttinen (SDP), 5,562 votes; Sirpa Pietikäinen (Kok), 12,658 votes; Pekka Räty (Vihr), 2,770 votes; Väinö Saario (Kok), 4,448 votes; Lea Savolainen (SDP), 6,519 votes; Jouko Skinnari (SDP), 5,684 votes; Hannu Tenhiälä (Kesk), 5,157 votes; Kyösti Toivonen (Kok), 3,653 votes; and Iiro Viinanen (Kok), 5,290 votes.

==== 1980s ====
===== 1987 =====
Results of the 1987 parliamentary election held on 15 and 16 March 1987:

Party		Party			Electoral Alliance		
Party		Votes	%	Seats	Votes	%	Seats
Social Democratic Party of Finland	SDP	64,943	30.47%	6	64,943	30.47%	6
National Coalition Party	Kok	64,766	30.38%	6	64,766	30.38%	6
Centre Party	Kesk	25,703	12.06%	2	27,016	12.67%	2
Liberal People's Party	LKP	962	0.45%	0	27,016	12.67%	2
Swedish People's Party of Finland	SFP	351	0.16%	0	27,016	12.67%	2
Finnish People's Democratic League	SKDL	18,930	8.88%	1	18,930	8.88%	1
Finnish Rural Party	SMP	9,639	4.52%	0	9,639	4.52%	0
Democratic Alternative	DEVA	8,741	4.10%	0	8,741	4.10%	0
Finnish Christian League	SKL	8,314	3.90%	0	8,314	3.90%	0
Green League	Vihr	7,860	3.69%	0	7,860	3.69%	0
Pensioners' Party	SEP	2,956	1.39%	0	2,956	1.39%	0
Valid votes		213,165	100.00%	15	213,165	100.00%	15
Rejected votes		1,176	0.55%				
Total polled		214,341	73.88%				
Registered electors		290,128					

The following candidates were elected: Sirkka-Liisa Anttila (Kesk), 9,464 votes; Esko Helle (SKDL), 6,192 votes; Ilkka Joenpalo (SDP), 5,795 votes; Arto Lapiolahti (SDP), 7,043 votes; Matti Luttinen (SDP), 7,954 votes; Tapani Mörttinen (Kok), 8,126 votes; Sirpa Pietikäinen (Kok), 15,981 votes; Ulla Puolanne (Kok), 8,169 votes; Jorma Rantanen (SDP), 5,451 votes; Lea Savolainen (SDP), 9,818 votes; Jouko Skinnari (SDP), 6,888 votes; Hannu Tenhiälä (Kesk), 6,072 votes; Ritva Vastamäki (Kok), 3,964 votes; Iiro Viinanen (Kok), 6,194 votes; and Matti Viljanen (Kok), 6,099 votes.

===== 1983 =====
Results of the 1983 parliamentary election held on 20 and 21 March 1983:

Party		Party			Electoral Alliance		
Party		Votes	%	Seats	Votes	%	Seats
Social Democratic Party of Finland	SDP	74,581	33.42%	5	74,581	33.42%	5
National Coalition Party	Kok	63,073	28.26%	5	63,073	28.26%	5
Centre Party and Liberal People's Party	Kesk-LKP	25,807	11.56%	2	33,901	15.19%	2
Finnish Christian League	SKL	7,695	3.45%	0	33,901	15.19%	2
Swedish People's Party of Finland	SFP	399	0.18%	0	33,901	15.19%	2
Finnish People's Democratic League	SKDL	26,586	11.91%	2	26,586	11.91%	2
Finnish Rural Party	SMP	21,671	9.71%	1	21,671	9.71%	1
Joint List A (Green League)		3,384	1.52%	0	3,384	1.52%	0
Valid votes		223,196	100.00%	15	223,196	100.00%	15
Rejected votes		1,141	0.51%				
Total polled		224,337	78.47%				
Registered electors		285,880					

The following candidates were elected: Sirkka-Liisa Anttila (Kesk), 6,814 votes; Esko Helle (SKDL), 4,548 votes; Matti Kautto (SKDL), 6,171 votes; Martti Lähdesmäki (SDP), 6,828 votes; Matti Luttinen (SDP), 8,695 votes; Saara Mikkola (Kok), 6,776 votes; Sirpa Pietikäinen (Kok), 6,863 votes; Ulla Puolanne (Kok), 7,942 votes; Jorma Rantanen (SDP), 7,250 votes; Lea Savolainen (SDP), 12,056 votes; Jouko Skinnari (SDP), 6,699 votes; Hannu Tenhiälä (Kesk), 6,799 votes; Mikko Vainio (SMP), 11,187 votes; Iiro Viinanen (Kok), 6,760 votes; and Matti Viljanen (Kok), 8,093 votes.

==== 1970s ====
===== 1979 =====
Results of the 1979 parliamentary election held on 18 and 19 March 1979:

Party		Party			Electoral Alliance		
Party		Votes	%	Seats	Votes	%	Seats
Social Democratic Party of Finland	SDP	65,885	30.25%	5	65,885	30.25%	5
National Coalition Party	Kok	62,010	28.47%	5	62,010	28.47%	5
Finnish People's Democratic League	SKDL	33,620	15.44%	2	34,369	15.78%	2
Socialist Workers Party	STP	749	0.34%	0	34,369	15.78%	2
Centre Party	Kesk	25,477	11.70%	2	31,428	14.43%	2
Liberal People's Party	LKP	5,951	2.73%	0	31,428	14.43%	2
Finnish Christian League	SKL	13,768	6.32%	1	23,572	10.82%	1
Finnish Rural Party	SMP	8,678	3.98%	0	23,572	10.82%	1
Constitutional People's Party	PKP	1,126	0.52%	0	23,572	10.82%	1
Finnish People's Unity Party	SKYP	519	0.24%	0	519	0.24%	0
Valid votes		217,783	100.00%	15	217,783	100.00%	15
Rejected votes		1,075	0.49%				
Total polled		218,858	78.29%				
Registered electors		279,560					

The following candidates were elected: Lasse Äikäs (Kesk), 6,805 votes; Eino Grönholm (SDP), 6,737 votes; Ulla Järvilehto (SKL), 8,910 votes; Aarne Koskinen (SKDL), 7,176 votes; Matti Luttinen (SDP), 8,697 votes; Saara Mikkola (Kok), 6,293 votes; Tapani Mörttinen (Kok), 8,197 votes; Salme Myyryläinen (SDP), 8,338 votes; Olavi Nikkilä (Kok), 6,984 votes; Ulla Puolanne (Kok), 9,387 votes; Lea Savolainen (SDP), 11,752 votes; Helge Sirén (SDP), 6,617 votes; Kauko Tamminen (SKDL), 6,883 votes; Hannu Tenhiälä (Kesk), 8,228 votes; and Matti Viljanen (Kok), 9,893 votes.

===== 1975 =====
Results of the 1975 parliamentary election held on 21 and 22 September 1975:

Party		Party			Electoral Alliance		
Party		Votes	%	Seats	Votes	%	Seats
Social Democratic Party of Finland	SDP	62,923	30.54%	5	62,923	30.54%	5
National Coalition Party	Kok	51,331	24.92%	4	61,179	29.70%	5
Finnish Christian League	SKL	9,848	4.78%	1	61,179	29.70%	5
Finnish People's Democratic League	SKDL	36,204	17.57%	3	37,305	18.11%	3
Socialist Workers Party	STP	1,101	0.53%	0	37,305	18.11%	3
Centre Party	Kesk	25,999	12.62%	2	34,138	16.57%	2
Liberal People's Party	LKP	6,785	3.29%	0	34,138	16.57%	2
Finnish People's Unity Party	SKYP	1,354	0.66%	0	34,138	16.57%	2
Finnish Rural Party	SMP	7,168	3.48%	0	10,477	5.09%	0
Finnish Constitutional People's Party	SPK	1,989	0.97%	0	10,477	5.09%	0
Party of Finnish Entrepreneurs	SYP	1,320	0.64%	0	10,477	5.09%	0
Valid votes		206,022	100.00%	15	206,022	100.00%	15
Rejected votes		1,374	0.66%				
Total polled		207,396	76.89%				
Registered electors		269,731					

The following candidates were elected: Lyyli Aalto (SDP), 5,707 votes; Lasse Äikäs (Kesk), 8,309 votes; Ulla Järvilehto (SKL), 9,404 votes; Aarne Koskinen (SKDL), 7,516 votes; Matti Luttinen (SDP), 7,508 votes; Timo Mäki (Kok), 6,423 votes; Saara Mikkola (Kok), 5,978 votes; Tapani Mörttinen (Kok), 7,357 votes; Salme Myyryläinen (SDP), 8,948 votes; Ulla Puolanne (Kok), 7,286 votes; Eero Salo (SDP), 6,511 votes; Helge Sirén (SDP), 6,065 votes; Helge Talvitie (SKDL), Kauko Tamminen (SKDL), 8,525 votes; and Hannu Tenhiälä (Kesk), 5,672 votes.

===== 1972 =====
Results of the 1972 parliamentary election held on 2 and 3 January 1972:

Party		Votes	%	Seats
Social Democratic Party of Finland	SDP	61,523	31.92%	5
National Coalition Party	Kok	44,602	23.14%	4
Finnish People's Democratic League	SKDL	31,680	16.44%	3
Centre Party	Kesk	23,041	11.96%	2
Finnish Rural Party	SMP	14,518	7.53%	1
Liberal People's Party	LKP	9,409	4.88%	0
Finnish Christian League	SKL	5,092	2.64%	0
Social Democratic Union of Workers and Smallholders	TPSL	2,860	1.48%	0
Valid votes		192,725	100.00%	15
Rejected votes		735	0.38%	
Total polled		193,460	81.45%	
Registered electors		237,532		

The following candidates were elected: Lyyli Aalto (SDP), 7,090 votes; Erkki Huurtamo (Kok), 7,236 votes; Osmo Kock (SKDL), 8,113 votes; Leo Kohtala (SDP), 7,158 votes; Aarne Koskinen (SKDL), 6,630 votes; Sirkka Lankinen (Kok), 5,220 votes; Eino Lottanen (Kesk), 3,923 votes; Timo Mäki (Kok), 7,393 votes; Väinö Mäkinen (SDP), 6,122 votes; Salme Myyryläinen (SDP), 10,685 votes; Olavi Nikkilä (Kok), 6,109 votes; Eero Salo (SDP), 7,153 votes; Jouko Siikaniemi (Kesk), 4,128 votes; Kauko Tamminen (SKDL), 6,234 votes; and Mikko Vainio (SMP), 7,430 votes.

===== 1970 =====
Results of the 1970 parliamentary election held on 15 and 16 March 1970:

Party		Votes	%	Seats
Social Democratic Party of Finland	SDP	54,828	29.28%	5
National Coalition Party	Kok	46,644	24.91%	4
Finnish People's Democratic League	SKDL	29,107	15.54%	2
Centre Party	Kesk	24,280	12.96%	2
Finnish Rural Party	SMP	15,933	8.51%	1
Liberal People's Party	LKP	10,337	5.52%	0
Finnish Christian League	SKL	3,115	1.66%	0
Social Democratic Union of Workers and Smallholders	TPSL	2,952	1.58%	0
Others		87	0.05%	0
Valid votes		187,283	100.00%	14
Rejected votes		811	0.43%	
Total polled		188,094	82.53%	
Registered electors		227,901		

The following candidates were elected: Lyyli Aalto (SDP), 6,264 votes; Erkki Huurtamo (Kok), 6,823 votes; Leo Kohtala (SDP), 6,256 votes; Aarne Koskinen (SKDL), 6,244 votes; Sirkka Lankinen (Kok), 5,549 votes; Eino Lottanen (Kesk), 3,989 votes; Timo Mäki (Kok), 8,169 votes; Väinö Mäkinen (SDP), 5,654 votes; Salme Myyryläinen (SDP), 7,345 votes; Olavi Nikkilä (Kok), 6,765 votes; Eero Salo (SDP), 5,857 votes; Jouko Siikaniemi (Kesk), 3,882 votes; Kauko Tamminen (SKDL), 5,653 votes; and Mikko Vainio (SMP), 4,740 votes.

==== 1960s ====
===== 1966 =====
Results of the 1966 parliamentary election held on 20 and 21 March 1966:

Party		Party			Electoral Alliance		
Party		Votes	%	Seats	Votes	%	Seats
Social Democratic Party of Finland	SDP	56,169	32.45%	5	56,169	32.45%	5
Finnish People's Democratic League	SKDL	33,942	19.61%	2	40,660	23.49%	3
Social Democratic Union of Workers and Smallholders	TPSL	6,718	3.88%	1	40,660	23.49%	3
National Coalition Party	Kok	32,432	18.74%	3	32,432	18.74%	3
Centre Party	Kesk	28,216	16.30%	2	29,533	17.06%	2
Finnish Christian League	SKL	1,317	0.76%	0	29,533	17.06%	2
Liberal People's Party	LKP	13,441	7.76%	1	13,441	7.76%	1
Smallholders' Party of Finland	SPP	856	0.49%	0	856	0.49%	0
Write-in lists		14	0.01%	0	14	0.01%	0
Valid votes		173,105	100.00%	14	173,105	100.00%	14
Blank votes		116	0.07%				
Rejected Votess – Other		559	0.32%				
Total polled		173,780	85.11%				
Registered electors		204,192					

The following candidates were elected: Lyyli Aalto (SDP), 5,920 votes; Kaino Haapanen (SKDL), 6,582 votes; Leo Häppölä (Kesk), 5,320 votes; Erkki Huurtamo (Kok), 8,264 votes; Osmo Kock (SKDL), 11,030 votes; Eino Lottanen (Kesk), 6,032 votes; Timo Mäki (Kok), 5,372 votes; Väinö Mäkinen (SDP), 6,372 votes; Olavi Nikkilä (Kok), 5,845 votes; Ensio Partanen (SDP), 5,100 votes; Eino Raunio (SDP), 5,769 votes; Uuno Takki (SDP), 7,340 votes; Juho Tenhiälä (LKP), 6,151 votes; and Olli J. Uoti (TPSL), 6,647 votes.

===== 1962 =====
Results of the 1962 parliamentary election held on 4 and 5 February 1962:

Party		Party			Electoral Alliance		
Party		Votes	%	Seats	Votes	%	Seats
Social Democratic Party of Finland	SDP	42,587	25.39%	4	42,587	25.39%	4
National Coalition Party	Kok	34,268	20.43%	3	35,493	21.16%	3
Liberal League	VL	1,225	0.73%	0	35,493	21.16%	3
Finnish People's Democratic League	SKDL	33,545	20.00%	3	33,545	20.00%	3
Agrarian Party	ML	31,094	18.54%	3	33,183	19.78%	3
Centre Party		2,089	1.25%	0	33,183	19.78%	3
People's Party of Finland	SK	10,846	6.47%	1	10,846	6.47%	1
Social Democratic Union of Workers and Smallholders	TPSL	10,500	6.26%	0	10,500	6.26%	0
Smallholders' Party of Finland	SPP	1,574	0.94%	0	1,574	0.94%	0
Valid votes		167,728	100.00%	14	167,728	100.00%	14
Rejected votes		566	0.34%				
Total polled		168,294	85.16%				
Registered electors		197,632					

The following candidates were elected: Lyyli Aalto (SDP), 7,763 votes; Olli Aulanko (Kok), 5,934 votes; Kaino Haapanen (SKDL), 7,066 votes; Leo Häppölä (ML), 6,947 votes; Erkki Huurtamo (Kok), 9,330 votes; Olavi Kajala (SDP), 4,659 votes; Lauri Laine (Note: Lauri Laine (Kesk) is showing as elected from Häme Province North at the 1962 parliamentary election in Suomen virallinen tilasto XXIX A:28: Kansanedustajain vaalit 1962 but Parliament of Finland website shows him to be a member for Häme Province South from 1962 to 1966.) (ML), 5,432 votes; Hemmi Lindqvist (SKDL), 4,155 votes; Eemil Luukka (ML), 6,347 votes; Väinö Nieminen (Kok), 4,438 votes; Ensio Partanen (SDP), 8,850 votes; Eino Raunio (SDP), 5,976 votes; Kauko Tamminen (SKDL), 5,151 votes; and Juho Tenhiälä (SK), 5,086 votes.

==== 1950s ====
===== 1958 =====
Results of the 1958 parliamentary election held on 6 and 7 July 1958:

Party		Party			Electoral Alliance		
Party		Votes	%	Seats	Votes	%	Seats
Social Democratic Party of Finland	SDP	35,845	25.25%	4	35,845	25.25%	4
Finnish People's Democratic League	SKDL	29,071	20.48%	3	29,071	20.48%	3
National Coalition Party	Kok	27,902	19.65%	3	28,671	20.20%	3
Liberal League	VL	769	0.54%	0	28,671	20.20%	3
Agrarian Party	ML	26,424	18.61%	2	26,424	18.61%	2
People's Party of Finland	SK	11,476	8.08%	1	11,476	8.08%	1
Social Democratic Opposition	SDO	9,617	6.77%	1	9,617	6.77%	1
Free Citizens and Centre List		850	0.60%	0	850	0.60%	0
Write-in lists		11	0.01%	0	11	0.01%	0
Valid votes		141,965	100.00%	14	141,965	100.00%	14
Rejected votes		688	0.48%				
Total polled		142,653	74.93%				
Registered electors		190,373					

The following candidates were elected: Lyyli Aalto (SDP), 3,898 votes; Olli Aulanko (Kok), 5,126 votes; Kaino Haapanen (SKDL), 5,975 votes; Leo Häppölä (ML), 4,097 votes; Eino Kilpi (SKDL), 7,379 votes; Oskari Lehtonen (Kok), 5,128 votes; Eemil Luukka (ML), 4,324 votes; Väinö Nieminen (Kok), 3,961 votes; Ensio Partanen (SDP), 6,211 votes; Eino Raunio (SDP), 4,174 votes; Kauko Tamminen (SKDL), 3,157 votes; Juho Tenhiälä (SK), 3,511 votes; Heikki Törmä (SDP), 2,946 votes; and Olli J. Uoti (SDO), 3,840 votes.

===== 1954 =====
Results of the 1954 parliamentary election held on 7 and 8 March 1954:

Party		Party			Electoral Alliance		
Party		Votes	%	Seats	Votes	%	Seats
Social Democratic Party of Finland	SDP	47,588	32.65%	5	47,588	32.65%	5
Finnish People's Democratic League	SKDL	28,844	19.79%	3	28,844	19.79%	3
Agrarian Party	ML	28,272	19.40%	3	28,272	19.40%	3
National Coalition Party	Kok	23,573	16.17%	2	23,573	16.17%	2
People's Party of Finland	SK	16,967	11.64%	1	17,466	11.98%	1
Liberal League	VL	499	0.34%	0	17,466	11.98%	1
Write-in lists		17	0.01%	0	17	0.01%	0
Valid votes		145,760	100.00%	14	145,760	100.00%	14
Rejected votes		689	0.47%				
Total polled		146,449	78.88%				
Registered electors		185,671					

The following candidates were elected: Eero Antikainen (SDP); Leo Häppölä (ML); Kaino Haapanen (SKDL); Olavi Kajala (SDP); Eino Kilpi (SKDL); Lauri Laine (ML); Hemmi Lindqvist (SKDL); Eemil Luukka (ML); Aino Malkamäki (SDP); Erkki Mohell (SDP); Eino Raunio (SDP); Felix Seppälä (Kok); Juho Tenhiälä (SK); and Arno Tuurna (Kok).

===== 1951 =====
Results of the 1951 parliamentary election held on 1 and 2 July 1951:

Party		Party			Electoral Alliance		
Party		Votes	%	Seats	Votes	%	Seats
Social Democratic Party of Finland	SDP	44,148	33.47%	5	44,148	33.47%	5
Finnish People's Democratic League	SKDL	26,656	20.21%	3	26,656	20.21%	3
National Coalition Party	Kok	25,389	19.25%	3	25,829	19.58%	3
Liberal League	VL	440	0.33%	0	25,829	19.58%	3
Agrarian Party	ML	24,941	18.91%	2	24,941	18.91%	2
People's Party of Finland	SK	10,248	7.77%	1	10,248	7.77%	1
Small Farmers Party		70	0.05%	0	70	0.05%	0
Write-in lists		20	0.02%	0	20	0.02%	0
Valid votes		131,912	100.00%	14	131,912	100.00%	14
Rejected votes		1,313	0.99%				
Total polled		133,225	74.67%				
Registered electors		178,412					

The following candidates were elected: Eero Antikainen (SDP); Leo Häppölä (ML); Kaino Haapanen (SKDL); Eino Kilpi (SKDL); Martti O. Kölli (Kok); Oskari Lehtonen (Kok); Hemmi Lindqvist (SKDL); Eemil Luukka (ML); Aino Malkamäki (SDP); Eino Raunio (SDP); Felix Seppälä (Kok); Uuno Takki (SDP); Juho Tenhiälä (SK); and Otto Toivonen (SDP).

==== 1940s ====
===== 1948 =====
Results of the 1948 parliamentary election held on 1 and 2 July 1948:

Party		Party			Electoral Alliance		
Party		Votes	%	Seats	Votes	%	Seats
Social Democratic Party of Finland	SDP	38,306	33.93%	4	38,306	33.93%	4
National Coalition Party	Kok	25,460	22.55%	3	25,460	22.55%	3
Finnish People's Democratic League	SKDL	23,551	20.86%	2	23,551	20.86%	2
Agrarian Party	ML	16,836	14.91%	2	16,836	14.91%	2
National Progressive Party	KE	7,465	6.61%	0	7,939	7.03%	0
Small Farmers Party		474	0.42%	0	7,939	7.03%	0
Others		801	0.71%	0	801	0.71%	0
Valid votes		112,893	100.00%	11	112,893	100.00%	11
Rejected votes		595	0.52%				
Total polled		113,488	77.42%				
Registered electors		146,584					

The following candidates were elected: Olavi Kajala (SDP); Eino Kilpi (SKDL); Martti O. Kölli (Kok); Eino Kujanpää (SKDL); Lauri Laine (ML); Oskari Lehtonen (Kok); Aino Malkamäki (SDP); Eino Raunio (SDP); Felix Seppälä (Kok); Martti Suntela (ML); and Uuno Takki (SDP).

===== 1945 =====
Results of the 1945 parliamentary election held on 17 and 18 March 1945:

Party		Party			Electoral Alliance		
Party		Votes	%	Seats	Votes	%	Seats
Social Democratic Party of Finland	SDP	32,546	31.93%	4	32,546	31.93%	4
Finnish People's Democratic League	SKDL	25,985	25.49%	3	26,942	26.43%	3
Small Farmers Party		957	0.94%	0	26,942	26.43%	3
National Coalition Party	Kok	19,849	19.47%	2	19,849	19.47%	2
Agrarian Party	ML	13,297	13.05%	1	13,297	13.05%	1
National Progressive Party	KE	8,845	8.68%	1	8,845	8.68%	1
Write-in lists		448	0.44%	0	448	0.44%	0
Valid votes		101,927	100.00%	11	101,927	100.00%	11
Rejected votes		905	0.88%				
Total polled		102,832	79.14%				
Registered electors		129,939					

The following candidates were elected: Juho Hukari (SKDL); Väinö Kivisalo (SDP); Martti O. Kölli (Kok); Eino Kujanpää (SKDL); Lauri Laine (ML); Toivo Lång (SKDL); Aino Malkamäki (SDP); Eino Raunio (SDP); Felix Seppälä (Kok); Uuno Takki (SDP); and Sulo Teittinen (KE).

==== 1930s ====
===== 1939 =====
Results of the 1939 parliamentary election held on 1 and 2 July 1939:

Party		Party			Electoral Alliance		
Party		Votes	%	Seats	Votes	%	Seats
Social Democratic Party of Finland	SDP	38,177	50.72%	6	38,177	50.72%	6
Agrarian Party	ML	7,993	10.62%	1	12,920	17.16%	2
National Progressive Party	KE	4,927	6.55%	1	12,920	17.16%	2
National Coalition Party	Kok	11,261	14.96%	2	11,261	14.96%	2
Patriotic People's Movement	IKL	11,053	14.68%	1	11,053	14.68%	1
Party of Smallholders and Rural People	PMP	1,779	2.36%	0	1,779	2.36%	0
Write-in lists		85	0.11%	0	85	0.11%	0
Valid votes		75,275	100.00%	11	75,275	100.00%	11
Rejected votes		200	0.26%				
Total polled		75,475	69.19%				
Registered electors		109,089					

The following candidates were elected: Albert Eerola (Kok); Väinö Kivisalo (SDP); Oskari Lehtonen (Kok); Aino Malkamäki (SDP); Kaarlo Mikkola (ML); Anselm Pitkäsilta (SDP); Eino Raunio (SDP); Bruno Salmiala (IKL); Väinö Sinisalo (SDP); Sulo Teittinen (KE); and Otto Toivonen (SDP).

===== 1936 =====
Results of the 1936 parliamentary election held on 1 and 2 July 1936:

Party		Votes	%	Seats
Social Democratic Party of Finland	SDP	34,860	51.13%	6
Patriotic People's Movement	IKL	10,475	15.37%	2
National Coalition Party	Kok	7,489	10.99%	1
Agrarian Party	ML	7,416	10.88%	1
National Progressive Party	KE	6,590	9.67%	1
Small Farmers' Party of Finland	SPP	1,264	1.85%	0
Write-in lists		79	0.12%	0
Valid votes		68,173	100.00%	11
Rejected votes		501	0.73%	
Total polled		68,674	65.66%	
Registered electors		104,597		

The following candidates were elected: Kustaa Jussila (IKL); Väinö Kivisalo (SDP); Oskari Lehtonen (Kok); Aino Malkamäki (SDP); Oskari Mantere (KE); Otto Marttila (SDP); Anselm Pitkäsilta (SDP); Bruno Salmiala (IKL); Lauri Sariola (ML); Väinö Sinisalo (SDP); and Otto Toivonen (SDP).

===== 1933 =====
Results of the 1933 parliamentary election held on 1, 2 and 3 July 1933:

Party		Votes	%	Seats
Social Democratic Labour Party of Finland	SDTP	33,906	49.37%	6
National Coalition Party and Patriotic People's Movement	Kok-IKL	16,178	23.56%	3
National Progressive Party	KE	8,316	12.11%	1
Agrarian Party	ML	7,875	11.47%	1
Small Farmers' Party of Finland	SPP	2,184	3.18%	0
V. F. Johanson and M. Saarikoski		145	0.21%	0
Write-in lists		72	0.10%	0
Valid votes		68,676	100.00%	11
Rejected votes		419	0.61%	
Total polled		69,095	68.84%	
Registered electors		100,368		

The following candidates were elected: Sakari Honkala (Kok-IKL); Väinö Kivisalo (SDTP); Yrjö Leiwo (Kok-IKL); Aino Malkamäki (SDTP); Oskari Mantere (KE); Otto Marttila (SDTP); Kalle Myllymäki (SDTP); Lauri Sariola (ML); Väinö Sinisalo (SDTP); Bruno Sundström (Kok-IKL); and Otto Toivonen (SDTP).

===== 1930 =====
Results of the 1930 parliamentary election held on 1 and 2 October 1930:

Party		Party			Electoral Alliance		
Party		Votes	%	Seats	Votes	%	Seats
National Coalition Party	Kok	17,517	26.74%	4	32,333	49.37%	6
Agrarian Party	ML	9,204	14.05%	1	32,333	49.37%	6
National Progressive Party	KE	5,612	8.57%	1	32,333	49.37%	6
Social Democratic Labour Party of Finland	SDTP	31,305	47.80%	5	31,305	47.80%	5
Small Farmers' Party of Finland	SPP	1,749	2.67%	0	1,749	2.67%	0
Write-in lists		110	0.17%	0	110	0.17%	0
Valid votes		65,497	100.00%	11	65,497	100.00%	11
Rejected votes		456	0.69%				
Total polled		65,953	68.80%				
Registered electors		95,865					
Turnout		68.80%					

The following candidates were elected: Julius Ailio (SDTP); Mikko Erich (SDTP); J. W. Keto (SDTP); Väinö Kivisalo (SDTP); Wiljo-Kustaa Kuuliala (Kok); Oskari Lehtonen (Kok); Yrjö Leiwo (Kok); Lauri Mäkelä (Kok); Oskari Mantere (KE); Kalle Myllymäki (SDTP); and Juho Sunila (ML).

==== 1920s ====
===== 1929 =====
Results of the 1929 parliamentary election held on 1 and 2 July 1929:

Party		Votes	%	Seats
Social Democratic Labour Party of Finland	SDTP	24,043	41.69%	5
National Coalition Party	Kok	12,036	20.87%	2
Agrarian Party	ML	8,066	13.99%	2
Socialist Electoral Organisation of Workers and Smallholders	STPV	6,947	12.05%	1
National Progressive Party	KE	5,380	9.33%	1
Small Farmers' Party of Finland	SPP	1,084	1.88%	0
Write-in lists		108	0.19%	0
Valid votes		57,664	100.00%	11
Rejected votes		420	0.72%	
Total polled		58,084	60.22%	
Registered electors		96,461		

The following candidates were elected: Julius Ailio (SDTP); J. W. Keto (SDTP); Väinö Kivisalo (SDTP); Wiljo-Kustaa Kuuliala (Kok); Oskari Mantere (KE); Otto Marttila (SDTP); Kalle Myllymäki (SDTP); Evert Nukari (Kok); Lauri Sariola (ML); Juho Sunila (ML); and Jalmari Virta (STPV).

===== 1927 =====
Results of the 1927 parliamentary election held on 1 and 2 July 1927:

Party		Votes	%	Seats
Social Democratic Labour Party of Finland	SDTP	24,741	44.03%	5
National Coalition Party	Kok	12,980	23.10%	3
Agrarian Party	ML	6,704	11.93%	1
Socialist Electoral Organisation of Workers and Smallholders	STPV	5,989	10.66%	1
National Progressive Party	KE	5,698	10.14%	1
Write-in lists		74	0.13%	0
Valid votes		56,186	100.00%	11
Rejected votes		315	0.56%	
Total polled		56,501	61.40%	
Registered electors		92,023		

The following candidates were elected: Julius Ailio (SDTP); J. W. Keto (SDTP); Wiljo-Kustaa Kuuliala (Kok); Oskari Lehtonen (Kok); Olga Leinonen (SDTP); Oskari Mantere (KE); Kalle Myllymäki (SDTP); Evert Nukari (Kok); Otto Toivonen (SDTP); Juho Torppa (ML); and Jalmari Virta (STPV).

===== 1924 =====
Results of the 1924 parliamentary election held on 1 and 2 April 1924:

Party		Votes	%	Seats
Social Democratic Labour Party of Finland	SDTP	24,348	43.79%	5
National Coalition Party	Kok	13,557	24.38%	3
Agrarian Party	ML	7,492	13.47%	1
National Progressive Party	KE	5,651	10.16%	1
Socialist Electoral Organisation of Workers and Smallholders	STPV	4,487	8.07%	1
Write-in lists		73	0.13%	0
Valid votes		55,608	100.00%	11
Rejected votes		561	1.00%	
Total polled		56,169	63.74%	
Registered electors		88,123		

The following candidates were elected: Julius Ailio (SDTP); Albert Eerola (Kok); Kaarlo Kares (Kok); J. W. Keto (SDTP); Olga Leinonen (SDTP); Oskari Mantere (KE); Kalle Myllymäki (SDTP); Evert Nukari (Kok); Juho Sunila (ML); Otto Toivonen (SDTP); and Jalmari Virta (STPV).

===== 1922 =====
Results of the 1922 parliamentary election held on 1, 2 and 3 July 1922:

Party		Votes	%	Seats
Social Democratic Labour Party of Finland	SDTP	22,584	41.55%	5
National Coalition Party	Kok	13,599	25.02%	3
National Progressive Party	KE	7,005	12.89%	1
Socialist Workers' Party of Finland	SSTP	6,137	11.29%	1
Agrarian Party	ML	4,995	9.19%	1
Write-in lists		36	0.07%	0
Valid votes		54,356	100.00%	11
Rejected votes		336	0.61%	
Total polled		54,692	64.33%	
Registered electors		85,017		

The following candidates were elected: Kaarlo Kares (Kok); J. W. Keto (SDTP); Olga Leinonen (SDTP); Oskari Mantere (KE); Otto Marttila (SDTP); Kalle Myllymäki (SDTP); Rosa Sillanpää (SSTP); Juho Sunila (ML); Otto Toivonen (SDTP); Antti Tulenheimo (Kok); and Jalmari Viljanen (Kok).

==== 1910s ====
===== 1919 =====
Results of the 1919 parliamentary election held on 1, 2 and 3 March 1919:

Party		Party			Electoral Alliance		
Party		Votes	%	Seats	Votes	%	Seats
Social Democratic Labour Party of Finland	SDTP	28,121	50.26%	6	28,121	50.26%	6
National Progressive Party	KE	11,736	20.98%	3	14,297	25.55%	3
Christian Workers' Union of Finland	KrTL	1,348	2.41%	0	14,297	25.55%	3
Agrarian Party	ML	1,213	2.17%	0	14,297	25.55%	3
National Coalition Party	Kok	13,439	24.02%	2	13,439	24.02%	2
Write-in lists		90	0.16%	0	90	0.16%	0
Valid votes		55,947	100.00%	11	55,947	100.00%	11
Rejected votes		268	0.48%				
Total polled		56,215	71.25%				
Registered electors		78,901					

The following candidates were elected: Julius Ailio (SDTP); August Hämäläinen (KE); J. W. Keto (SDTP); Rope Kojonen (KE); Olga Leinonen (SDTP); Oskari Mantere (KE); Olavi Puro (SDTP); Hugo Suolahti (Kok); Oskari Väre (SDTP); Artturi H. Virkkunen (Kok); and Juho Virtanen (SDTP).

===== 1917 =====
Results of the 1917 parliamentary election held on 1 and 2 October 1917:

Party		Votes	%	Seats
Social Democratic Party of Finland	SDP	38,574	60.97%	7
United Finnish Parties (Finnish Party, Young Finnish Party and People's Party)	SP-NP-KP	22,496	35.56%	4
Christian Workers' Union of Finland	KrTL	1,995	3.15%	0
Write-in lists		198	0.31%	0
Valid votes		63,263	100.00%	11
Rejected votes		242	0.38%	
Total polled		63,505	75.18%	
Registered electors		84,474		

The following candidates were elected: Matti Airola (SDP); Toivo Alavirta (SDP); Rudolf Holsti (SP-NP-KP); Oskari Jalava (SDP); Alma Jokinen (SDP); Väinö E. Jokinen (SDP); Oswald Kairamo (SP-NP-KP); Alfred Retulainen (SP-NP-KP); Hulda Salmi (SDP); Heikki Välisalmi (SDP); and Artturi H. Virkkunen (SP-NP-KP).

===== 1916 =====
Results of the 1916 parliamentary election held on 1 and 3 July 1916:

Party		Votes	%	Seats
Social Democratic Party of Finland	SDP	32,663	63.16%	8
Finnish Party	SP	11,323	21.90%	2
Young Finnish Party	NP	6,514	12.60%	1
Christian Workers' Union of Finland	KrTL	1,118	2.16%	0
Write-in lists		96	0.19%	0
Valid votes		51,714	100.00%	11
Rejected votes		654	1.25%	
Total polled		52,368	62.13%	
Registered electors		84,294		

The following candidates were elected: Toivo Alavirta (SDP); Rudolf Holsti (NP); Oskari Jalava (SDP); Alma Jokinen (SDP); Väinö E. Jokinen (SDP); Otto Marttila (SDP); Valfrid Perttilä (SDP); Alfred Retulainen (SP); Hulda Salmi (SDP); Otto Toivonen (SDP); and Artturi H. Virkkunen (SP).

===== 1913 =====
Results of the 1913 parliamentary election held on 1 and 2 August 1913:

Party		Party			Electoral Alliance		
Party		Votes	%	Seats	Votes	%	Seats
Social Democratic Party of Finland	SDP	29,167	60.59%	7	29,167	60.59%	7
Finnish Party	SP	11,082	23.02%	2	11,082	23.02%	2
Young Finnish Party	NP	6,102	12.68%	2	7,840	16.29%	2
Christian Workers' Union of Finland	KrTL	1,738	3.61%	0	7,840	16.29%	2
Write-in lists		51	0.11%	0	51	0.11%	0
Valid votes		48,140	100.00%	11	48,140	100.00%	11
Rejected votes		298	0.62%				
Total polled		48,438	58.91%				
Registered electors		82,221					

The following candidates were elected: Johan Richard Danielson-Kalmari (SP); Rudolf Holsti (NP); Vihtori Huhta (SDP); Oskari Jalava (SDP); Heikki Jalonen (SDP); Alma Jokinen (SDP); Väinö E. Jokinen (SDP); Otto Marttila (SDP); Akseli Nikula (NP); Alfred Retulainen (SP); and Hulda Salmi (SDP).

===== 1911 =====
Results of the 1911 parliamentary election held on 2 and 3 January 1911:

Party		Votes	%	Seats
Social Democratic Party of Finland	SDP	29,921	59.40%	7
Finnish Party	SP	12,138	24.10%	3
Young Finnish Party	NP	6,952	13.80%	1
Christian Workers' Union of Finland	KrTL	1,307	2.59%	0
Write-in lists		57	0.11%	0
Valid votes		50,375	100.00%	11
Rejected votes		265	0.52%	
Total polled		50,640	64.46%	
Registered electors		78,564		

The following candidates were elected: Juho Astala (NP); Johan Richard Danielson-Kalmari (SP); Oskari Jalava (SDP); Heikki Jalonen (SDP); Alma Jokinen (SDP); Väinö E. Jokinen (SDP); Oswald Kairamo (SP); Otto Marttila (SDP); Hulda Salmi (SDP); Sulo Wuolijoki (SDP); and Lauri Yrjö-Koskinen (SP).

===== 1910 =====
Results of the 1910 parliamentary election held on 1 and 2 February 1910:

Party		Votes	%	Seats
Social Democratic Party of Finland	SDP	29,676	58.88%	7
Finnish Party	SP	12,498	24.80%	3
Young Finnish Party	NP	7,048	13.98%	1
Christian Workers' Union of Finland	KrTL	1,129	2.24%	0
Write-in lists		49	0.10%	0
Valid votes		50,400	100.00%	11
Rejected votes		261	0.52%	
Total polled		50,661	65.69%	
Registered electors		77,123		

The following candidates were elected: Juho Astala (NP); Johan Richard Danielson-Kalmari (SP); Oskari Jalava (SDP); Heikki Jalonen (SDP); Alma Jokinen (SDP); Väinö E. Jokinen (SDP); Oswald Kairamo (SP); Kustaa Kopila (SDP); Hulda Salmi (SDP); Sulo Wuolijoki (SDP); and Lauri Yrjö-Koskinen (SP).

==== 1900s ====
===== 1909 =====
Results of the 1909 parliamentary election held on 1 and 3 May 1909:

Party		Votes	%	Seats
Social Democratic Party of Finland	SDP	30,351	57.36%	7
Finnish Party	SP	14,165	26.77%	3
Young Finnish Party	NP	6,799	12.85%	1
Christian Workers' Union of Finland	KrTL	1,537	2.90%	0
Others		64	0.12%	0
Valid votes		52,916	100.00%	11
Rejected votes		252	0.47%	
Total polled		53,168	70.26%	
Registered electors		75,677		

The following candidates were elected: Johan Richard Danielson-Kalmari (SP); Voitto Eloranta (SDP); Evert Hokkanen (SDP); Oskari Jalava (SDP); Alma Jokinen (SDP); Väinö E. Jokinen (SDP); Oswald Kairamo (SP); H. G. Paloheimo (SP); J. H. Saaristo (SDP); Kaarlo Juho Ståhlberg (NP); and Sulo Wuolijoki (SDP).

===== 1908 =====
Results of the 1908 parliamentary election held on 1 and 2 July 1908:

Party		Votes	%	Seats
Social Democratic Party of Finland	SDP	30,451	57.97%	7
Finnish Party	SP	13,787	26.25%	3
Young Finnish Party	NP	6,669	12.70%	1
Christian Workers' Union of Finland	KrTL	1,381	2.63%	0
Agrarian Party	ML	115	0.22%	0
Others		122	0.23%	0
Valid votes		52,525	100.00%	11
Rejected votes		459	0.87%	
Total polled		52,984	71.99%	
Registered electors		73,598		

The following candidates were elected: Johan Richard Danielson-Kalmari (SP); Evert Hokkanen (SDP); Oskari Jalava (SDP); Alma Jokinen (SDP); Väinö E. Jokinen (SDP); Oswald Kairamo (SP); H. G. Paloheimo (SP); J. H. Saaristo (SDP); Arthur Sivenius (SDP); Kaarlo Juho Ståhlberg (NP); and Sulo Wuolijoki (SDP).

===== 1907 =====
Results of the 1907 parliamentary election held on 15 and 16 March 1907:

Party		Votes	%	Seats
Social Democratic Party of Finland	SDP	32,923	57.63%	7
Finnish Party	SP	15,706	27.49%	3
Young Finnish Party	NP	6,089	10.66%	1
Others		2,411	4.22%	0
Valid votes		57,129	100.00%	11
Rejected votes		331	0.58%	
Total polled		57,460	77.54%	
Registered electors		74,106		

The following candidates were elected: Johan Richard Danielson-Kalmari (SP); Voitto Eloranta (SDP); Lucina Hagman (NP); Evert Hokkanen (SDP); Oskari Jalava (SDP); Oswald Kairamo (SP); Maria Laine (SDP); Santeri Nuorteva (SDP); H. G. Paloheimo (SP); Arthur Sivenius (SDP); and Sulo Wuolijoki (SDP).
