= Anne Louhelainen =

Finnish politician

Member of Finnish Parliament for Tavastia
- Incumbent
- Assumed office 20 April 2011

Personal details
- Born: 8 January 1965 (age 61) Lahti, Finland
- Party: True Finns
- Website: www.annelouhelainen.net

Anne Louhelainen (née Vainio; born 8 January 1965 in Lahti) is a member of the parliament of Finland, elected 17 April 2011. She is the second chairman of the municipal council of Hollola, secretary and the treasurer of the Tavastia district of the True Finns. On 13 June 2017, Louhelainen and 19 others left the Finns Party parliamentary group to found the New Alternative parliamentary group.

Anne Louhelainen has worked for Kansallis-Osake-Pankki and Päijät-Hämeen Puhelin in various positions related to administration. Just before becoming elected Louhelainen worked for Empower Oy, which sustains the mobile networks for DNA Oy mobile phone operator. Päijät-Hämeen Puhelin is one of the main owners of Dna Group.

Her father is a former member of parliament, Mikko Vainio.
