= Sariola =

Sariola is a surname. Notable people with the surname include:

- Aale Sariola, (1882–1948), Finnish clergyman and politician
- Aleksi Sariola (born 1980), Finnish actor, singer, television presenter and director
- Lauri Sariola (1887–1940), Finnish farmer, journalist and politician
- Mauri Sariola (1924–1985), Finnish crime writer
- Toivo Sariola (1914–1985), Finnish sprinter

== See also ==
- Sariola, place in Finnish mythology
