= Väinö Sinisalo =

Finnish politician (1892–1951)

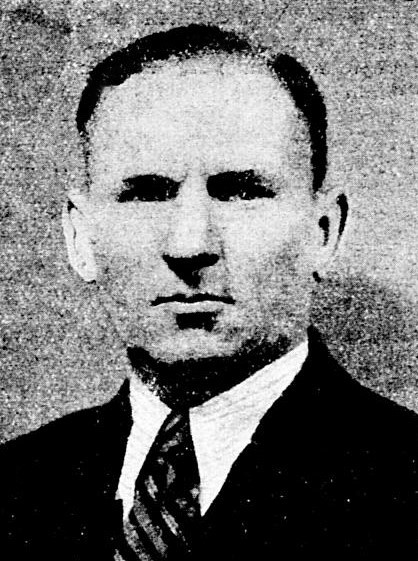
- Sinisalo in 1936

Member of the Finnish Parliament for Häme South constituency
- In office 1 September 1933 – 5 April 1945

Personal details
- Born: 13 February 1892 Mäntsälä, Grand Duchy of Finland
- Died: 27 March 1951 (aged 59) Riihimäki, Finland
- Party: Social Democratic Party of Finland

Väinö Viljam Sinisalo (13 February 1892 – 27 March 1951) was a Finnish politician. He was a member of the Parliament of Finland 1933–1945 for the Social Democratic Party of Finland.

== Life and career ==
Sinisalo was born to a poor farmworkers family. He started working at the age of 11 as a farmworker in the Kytäjä Mansion in Hyvinkää. In the 1918 Finnish Civil War, Sinisalo fought for the Red Guards. He was captured by the Whites and sentenced for five years in prison but pardoned in 1919. After the war, Sinisalo worked as a janitor at the local worker's hall in Herajoki, Riihimäki. He was a member of the parliament 1933–1945 and a presidential elector in 1937, 1940 and 1943.

== Family ==
Väinö Sinisalo is the father of the actor Veikko Sinisalo and the great-grandfather of the footballer Viljami Sinisalo.
