= Timo Heinonen =

Finnish politician

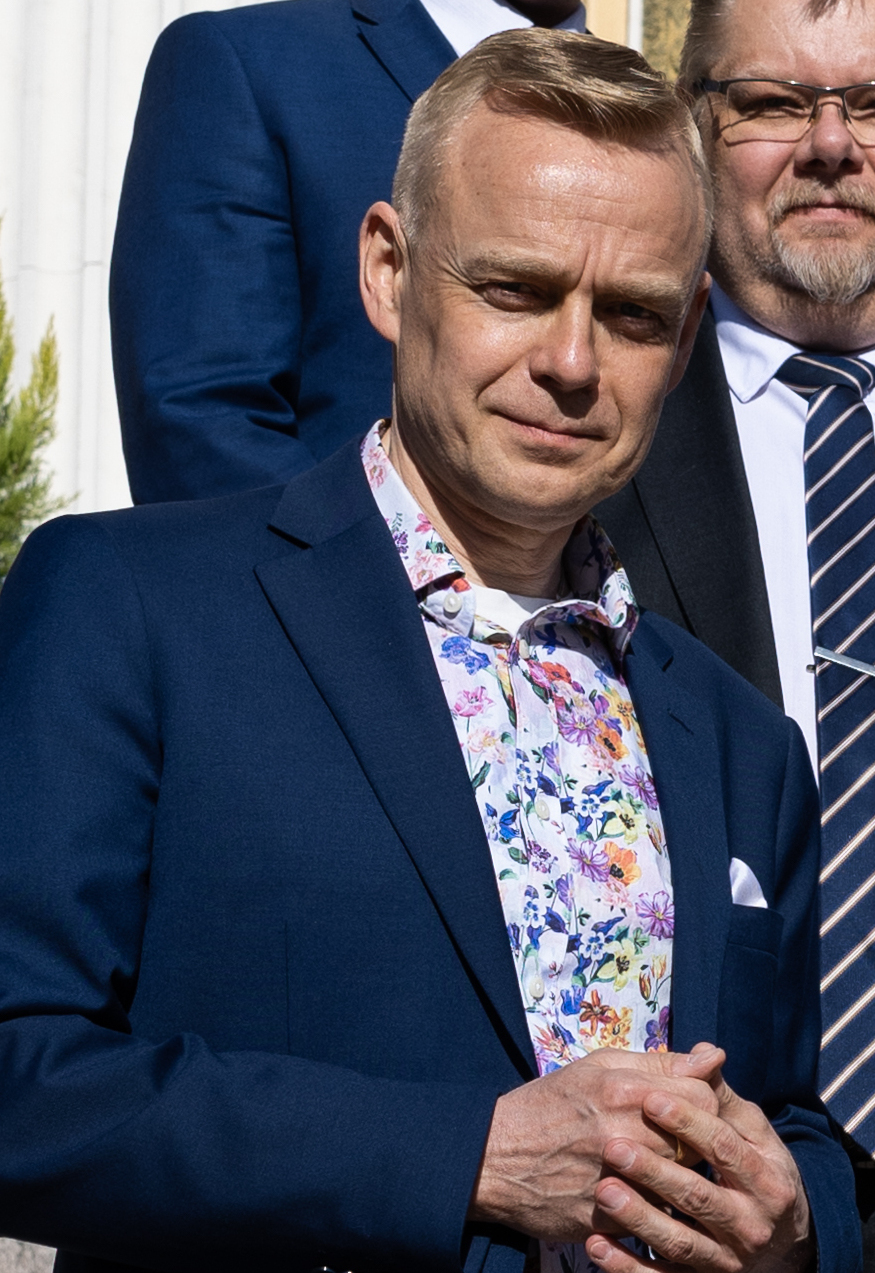

Member of the Finnish Parliament for Häme

Personal details
- Born: 15 February 1975 (age 51) Loppi, Kanta-Häme, Finland
- Party: National Coalition Party

Timo Pasi Petteri Heinonen (born 15 February 1975 in Loppi) is a Finnish politician currently serving in the Parliament of Finland for the National Coalition Party at the Häme constituency.
