= Jari Ronkainen =

Finnish politician

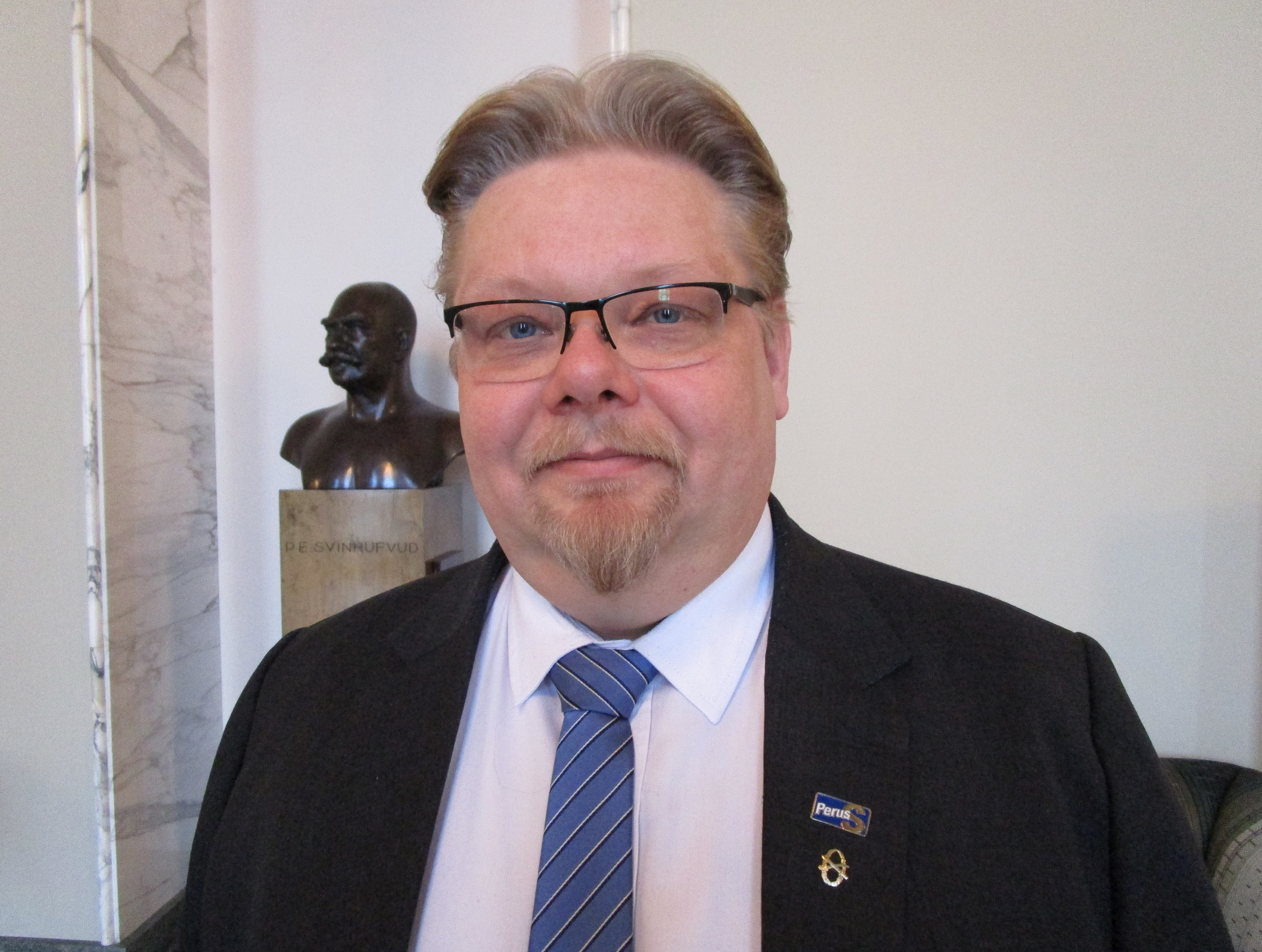

Member of the Finnish Parliament for Häme

Personal details
- Born: 28 May 1972 (age 53) Hollola, Päijät-Häme, Finland
- Party: Finns Party

Jari Pekka Ronkainen (born 28 May 1972 in Hollola) is a Finnish politician currently serving in the Parliament of Finland for the Finns Party at the Häme constituency.
