= Eino Raunio =

Finnish politician

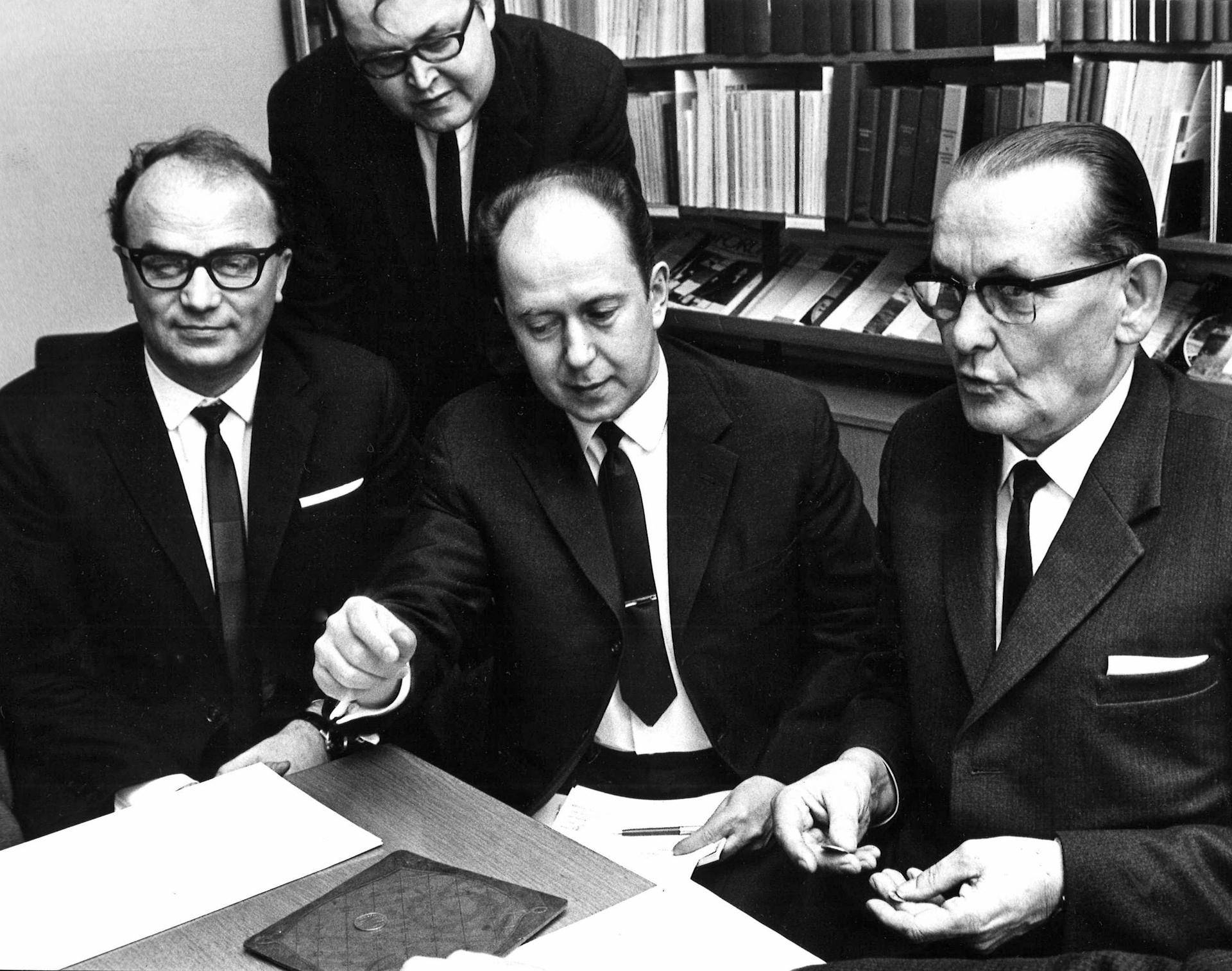
- Raunio (to the right) in 1969.

Minister of finance
- In office 1 January 1968 – 14 May 1970
- Prime Minister: Rafael Paasio; Mauno Koivisto
- Preceded by: Mauno Koivisto
- Succeeded by: Päiviö Hetemäki

Member of the Finnish Parliament
- In office 1 September 1939 – 22 March 1970
- Constituency: Häme

Personal details
- Born: Eino Albin Raunio; 18 January 1909 Sääksmäki, Grand Duchy of Finland
- Died: 18 March 1979 (aged 70) Forssa, Finland
- Party: Social Democratic
- Spouse: Katri Elina Väyrynen

Eino Albin Raunio (18 January 1909, in Sääksmäki – 18 March 1979, in Forssa) was a Finnish politician. He was the minister of finance from 1968 to 1970. He was a member of the Parliament of Finland from 1939 to 1970, representing the Social Democratic Party of Finland (SDP).
