= Rami Lehto =

Finnish politician

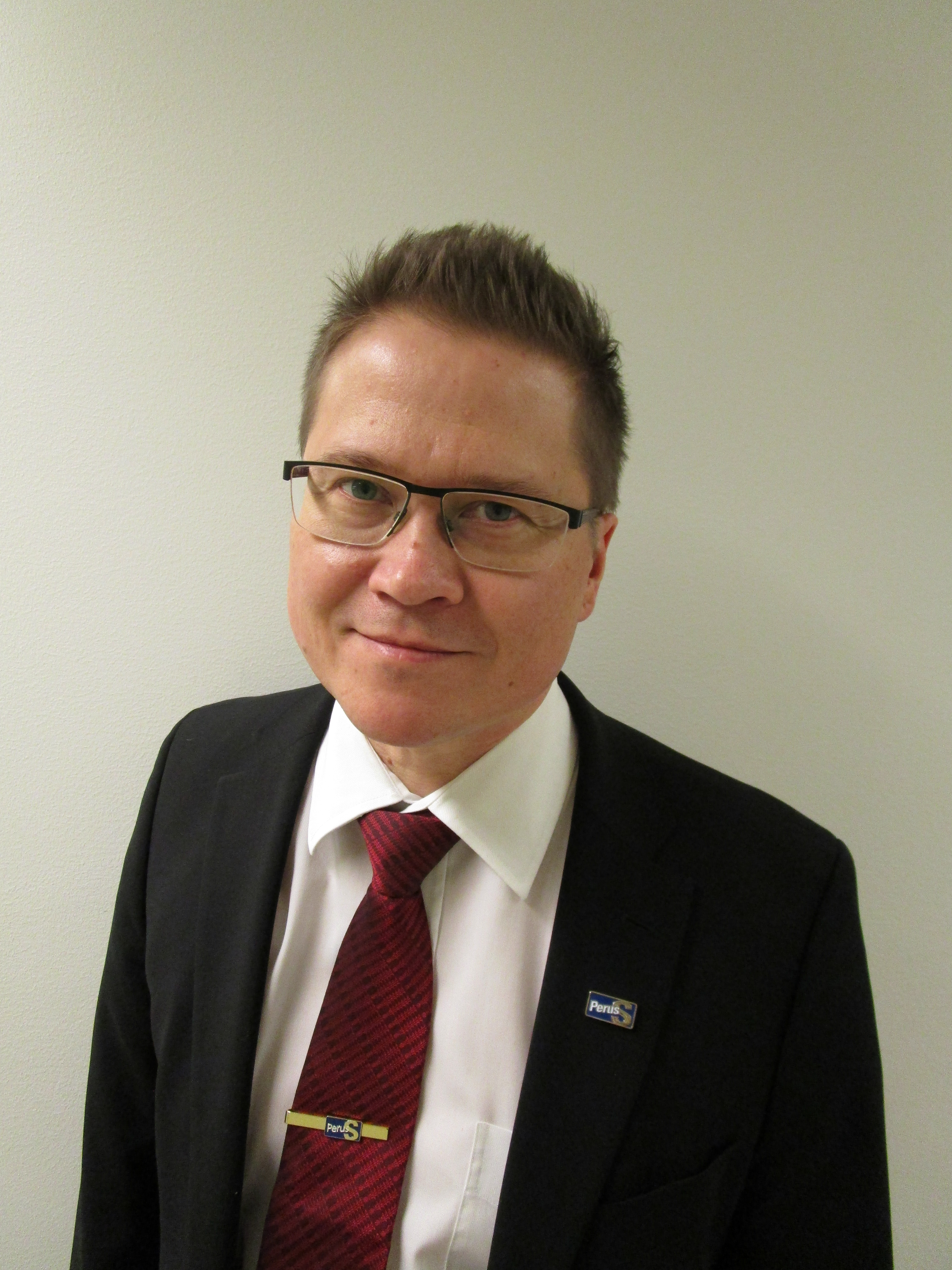
- Rami Lehto in Parliament on January 10, 2019

Member of the Finnish Parliament for Tavastia

Personal details
- Born: 15 March 1973 (age 53) Lahti
- Party: Finns Party

Rami Juhani Lehto (born 15 March 1973 in Lahti) is a Finnish politician currently serving in the Parliament of Finland for the Finns Party at the Tavastia constituency.
