= Mika Kari =

Finnish politician (born 1967)

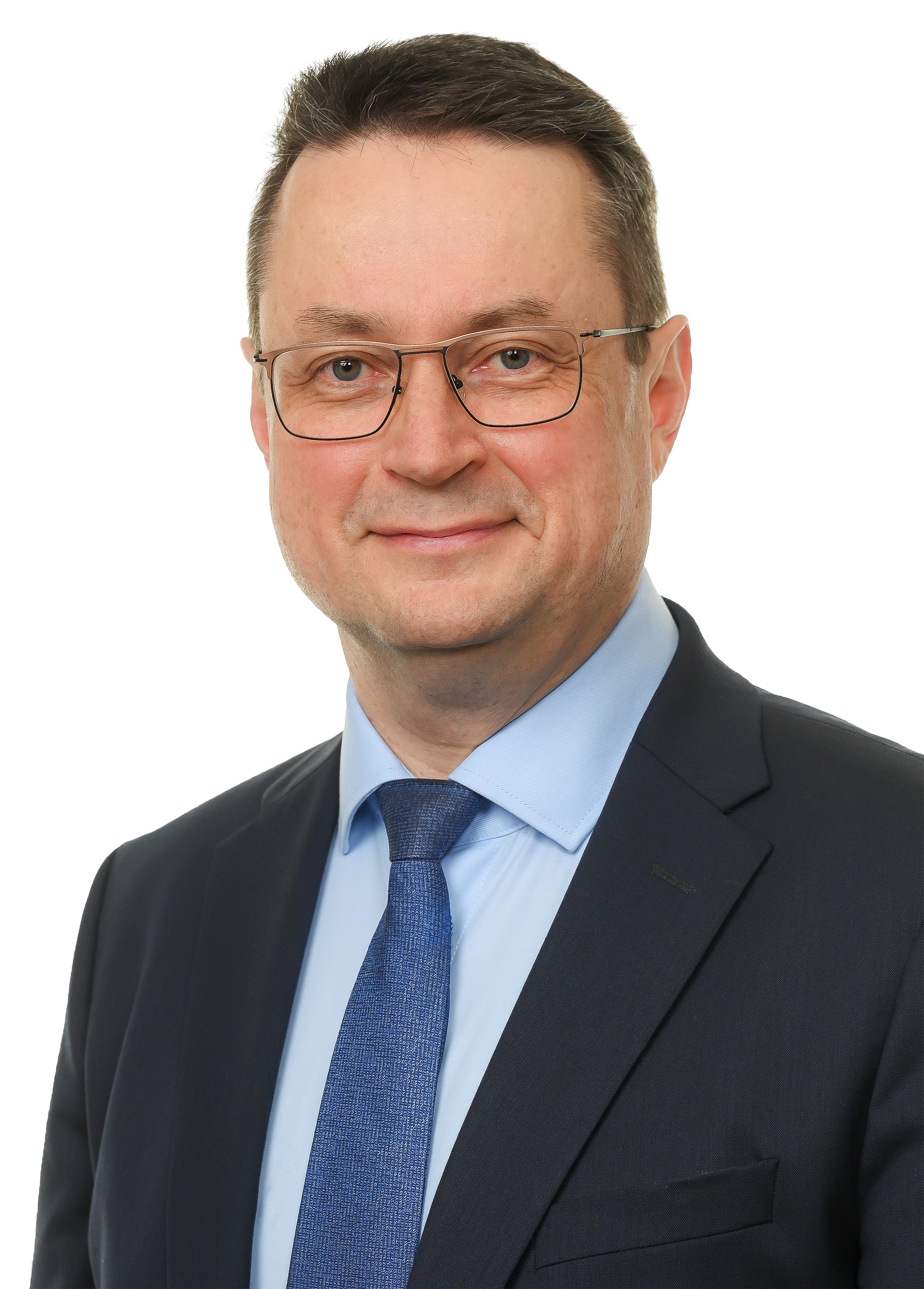

Member of the Finnish Parliament for Tavastia

Personal details
- Born: August 19, 1967 (age 58) Lahti, Päijät-Häme, Finland
- Party: Social Democratic Party of Finland

Mika Pekka Kari (born 19 August 1967, in Lahti) is a Finnish politician currently serving in the Parliament of Finland for the Social Democratic Party of Finland at the Tavastia constituency.
