= Matti Luttinen =

Finnish politician (1936–2009)

Matti Luttinen (born 14 May 1936, Haapavesi; died 14 May 2009) was a Finnish politician from the Social Democratic Party.

He participated actively in labour union activities in Tavastia. Luttinen was elected as a member of parliament from Tavastia constituency in 1975. He retired from the parliament in 1995.

Kalevi Sorsa selected him as a member of his cabinet. Between May and September 1983, Luttinen was one of the ministers in the interior ministry and from October 1983 to November 1984 Minister of the Interior. He worked from December 1984 to April 1987 as Minister of Transport.

Along with Parliament, he got elected to Lahti city council between 1969 and 1992, of which 1989-1992 he served as the chairman of the council.

Political offices
Preceded by Matti Ahde	Minister of the Interior (Finland); 1983−1984	Succeeded by Kaisa Raatikainen
