= Mirka Soinikoski =

Finnish politician

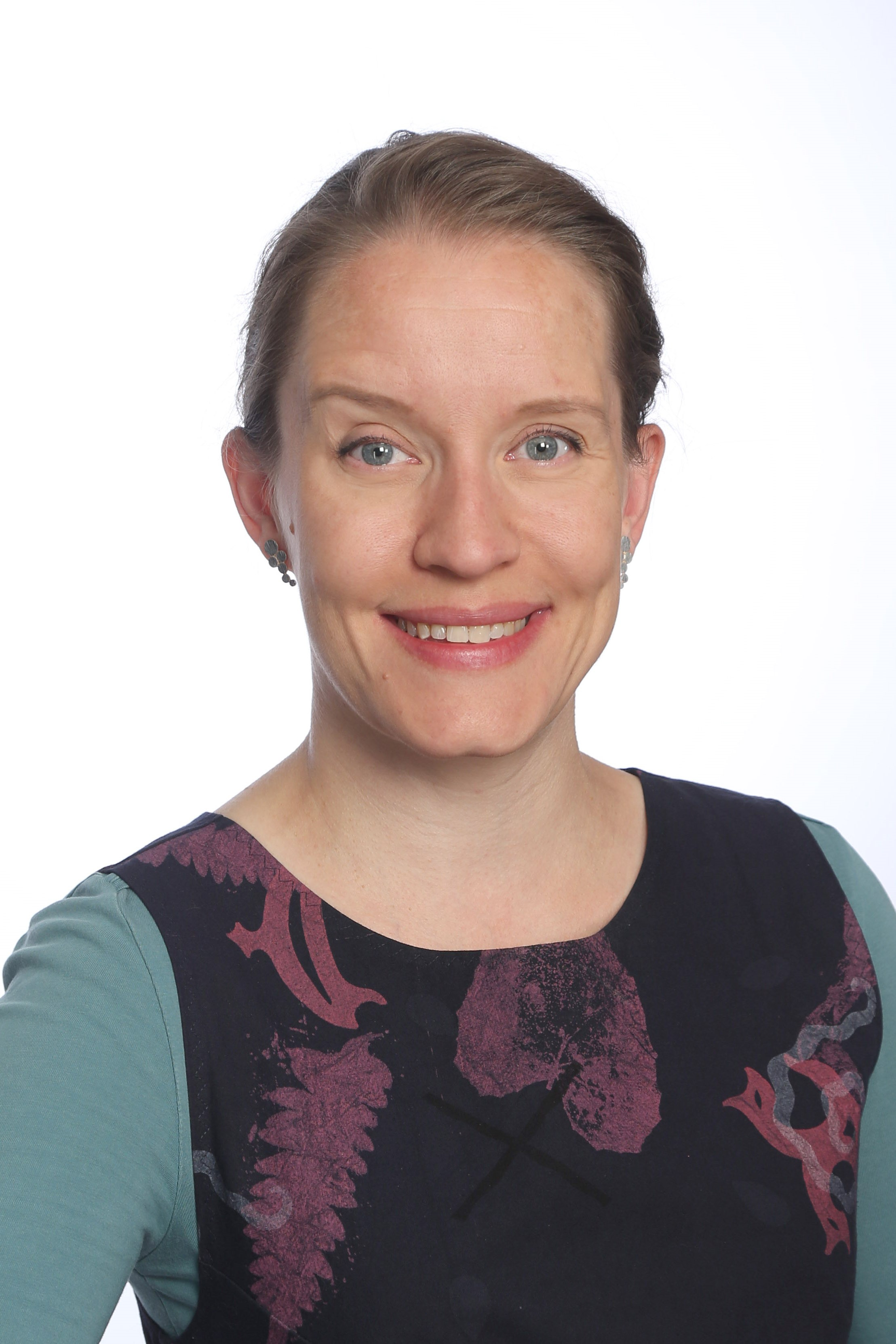
- Soinikoski in 2019

Member of the Finnish Parliament for Tavastia
- In office 17 April 2019 – 4 April 2024

Personal details
- Born: 16 December 1975 (age 50) Helsinki, Uusimaa, Finland
- Party: Green League
- Education: University of Turku
- Profession: Physician

Mirka Johanna Soinikoski (born 16 December 1975 in Helsinki) is a Finnish politician, who served in the Parliament of Finland for the Green League at the Tavastia constituency between 2019 and 2024.

Soinikoski is a medical specialist by education, graduating with a Licentiate in Medicine from the University of Turku in 2004. She specialised in Anesthesiology. Prior to entering parliament Soinikoski worked as a physician.

In 2021, during the COVID-19 pandemic, Soinikoski publicly supported the implementation of a COVID passport in Finland.
