= Juho Tenhiälä =

Finnish politician

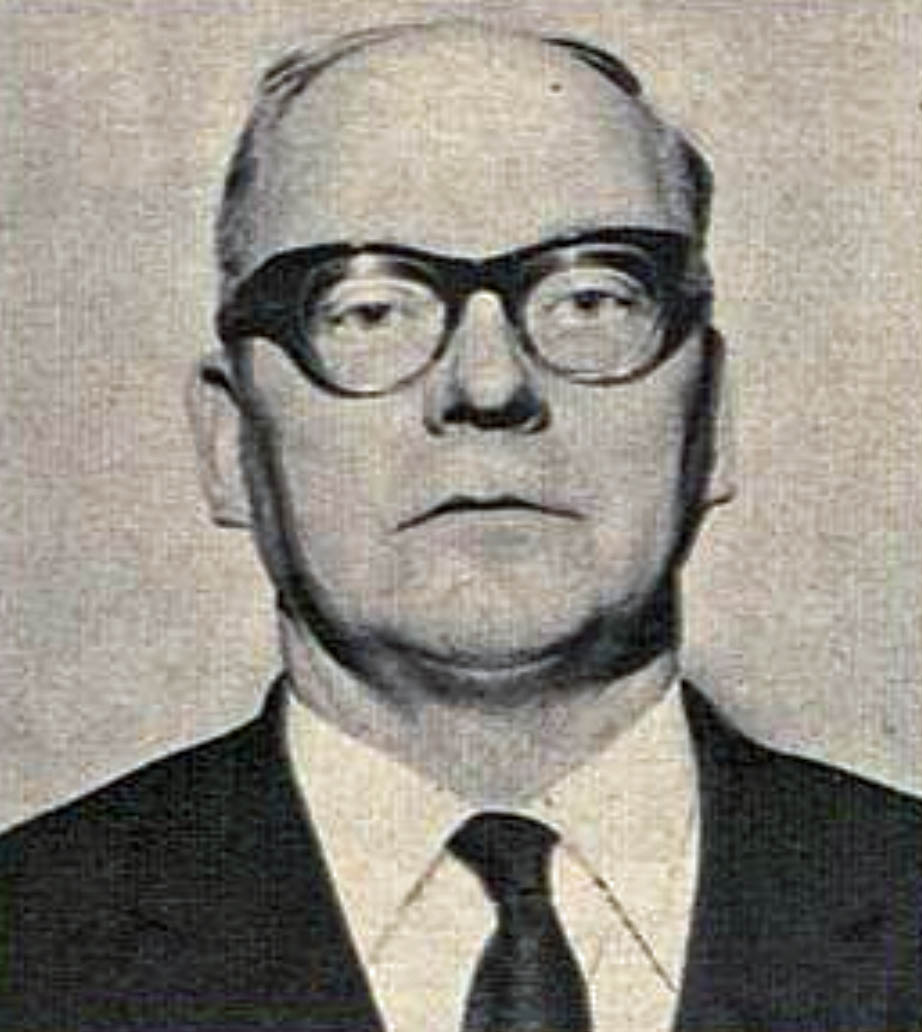
Juho Tenhiälä

Juho Jalmari Tenhiälä (21 July 1912, Hämeenkoski – 24 November 1999) was a Finnish Lutheran clergyman and politician. He served as Minister of Social Affairs from 12 September 1964 to 27 May 1966. Tenhiälä was a Member of the Parliament of Finland from 1951 to 1970, representing the People's Party of Finland from 1951 to 1965, the Liberal People's Party from 1965 to 1966 and the Centre Party from 1966 to 1970.
