= Kauko Tamminen =

Finnish politician (1920–1989)

Kauko Mikael Tamminen (14 September 1920 - 29 November 1989) was a Finnish paper mill worker and politician, born in Sääksmäki. He was a member of the Parliament of Finland from 1958 to 1966 and again from 1967 to 1983, representing the Finnish People's Democratic League (SKDL).
