= Jalmari Virta =

Finnish trade unionist and politician (1884–1938)

Johan Hjalmar (Juho Jalmari) Virta (5 January 1884 – 21 January 1938) was a Finnish trade unionist and politician, born in Kärkölä. He started his political career in the Social Democratic Party of Finland (SDP). After the Finnish Civil War of 1918, Virta was imprisoned for having served in the Red Guard. After he recovered his liberty, he was active in the Socialist Workers' Party of Finland (SSTP) until it was outlawed in 1923. He then joined the then clandestine Communist Party of Finland (SKP). He was a member of the Parliament of Finland from 1924 to 1930, representing the Socialist Electoral Organisation of Workers and Smallholders. As an arrest warrant was issued in July 1930 for the members of his parliamentary group, Virta went into hiding and in December 1930 relocated clandestinely to the Soviet Union as a political exile. He worked in the administration of the Karelian Autonomous Soviet Socialist Republic, but on 2 December 1937, during the Great Purge, he was arrested as suspected of counterrevolutionary activities. He was sentenced to death and shot on 21 January 1938. He was rehabilitated (posthumously exonerated) in 1938.
