= Mikko Erich =

Finnish politician

Michael (Mikko) Wilhelm Erich (6 December 1888, Turku - 28 December 1948) was a Finnish lawyer and politician. He was a member of the Parliament of Finland, representing the National Coalition Party from 1919 to 1922 and the Social Democratic Party of Finland (SDP) from 1930 to 1933 and again from 1939 to 1945. He was the younger brother of Rafael Erich.
