= Felix Seppälä =

Finnish schoolteacher and politician (1895–1972)

Felix Richard Seppälä (11 August 1895 – 18 October 1972) was a Finnish schoolteacher and politician, born in Pornainen. He was a member of the Parliament of Finland from 1945 until 1958, representing the National Coalition Party.
