= Toivo Alavirta =

Finnish journalist and politician (1890–1940)

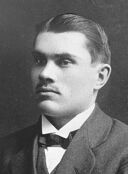
Toivo Alavirta

Toivo Villiam Alavirta (27 June 1890 - 23 June 1940; original surname Ahlström; name as Soviet citizen Тойво Казимирович Алавирта) was a Finnish journalist and politician. He was a member of the Parliament of Finland from 1916 to 1918. He died in prison after being convicted of political crimes during the Great Purge.

== Early years ==
Alavirta was born in Tammela. Alavirta's parents were factory worker Kasimir Ahlström and Henriika Flink. He went to public and business school, then worked from 1906 to 1912 as an accountant at the Forssa factories of Oy Finlayson Ab and until 1918 as a regional editor for Hämeen Voima in Forssa.

Alavirta joined the Russian Social Democratic Labour Party in 1906 and was elected to parliament in 1917 from the southern constituency of Häme county.

== In the Soviet Union ==
In 1918, during the Finnish Civil War, he worked in the administration of the Finnish Socialist Workers' Republic. When the Red side lost the war, he fled to Soviet Russia, where he was initially the office manager of the Bui settlement established for Finnish refugees. He joined both the Communist Party of Finland and the Communist Party of the Soviet Union and worked as a journalist as the director of Suomalainen Kustannusosuuskunta Kirja and editor of Vapaus magazine and a party functionary in the Karelian ASSR.

During the Finnish Civil War, Alavirta worked in the administration of the Reds and as a reporter for the Finnish People's Delegation's Reporter. After the war, he fled to Soviet Russia, where he was initially the office manager of the Bui settlement established for Finnish refugees. At the same time, Alavirta joined the Communist Party of Finland and was later also a member of the Communist Party of the Soviet Union. In Leningrad, Alavirta worked as the director of Suomalainen Kustannusosuuskunta Kirja and editor of Vapaus magazine. He was also the secretary of the Communist Party of Finland Central Committee and was later elected its chairman.

In 1927, Alavirta received permission from Santeri Nuorteva to move to the Republic of Karelia, where he worked as an editor for Punainen Kartjala, published in Petrozavodsk. In the same year, he became the chairman of the executive central committee of the Republic of Karelia, and in 1934 Alavirta was also elected secretary of the Uhtua district committee of the NKP. A year later, he was dismissed from the NKP by the Petroskoi City Committee's decision for "national fanaticism", after which Alavirta served as the director of the Petroskoi Party School from 1935 to 1937. Even before his arrest, he managed to work in a ski factory.

== Imprisonment and death ==
On 23 August 1937 Alavirta was arrested by the NKVD and sentenced to eight years in prison. He died on 23 June 1940 in a prison camp in Ust-Vym, in the Komi ASSR. He was posthumously rehabilitated by Soviet authorities in 1955.
