= Albert Eerola =

Finnish politician (1874–1950)

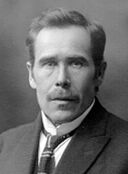
Albert Eerola

Johan Albert Eerola (28 April 1874 in Tuulos – 3 October 1950) was a Finnish politician. He was a member of the Parliament of Finland from 1924 to 1927 and again from 1939 to 1945, representing the National Coalition Party.
