= Sakari Honkala =

Finnish agronomist, farmer and politician (1895–1966)

Heikki Sakari Honkala (1895 – 9 April 1966) was a Finnish agronomist, farmer and politician, born in Vanaja. He was a member of the Parliament of Finland from 1933 until 1936, representing the Patriotic People's Movement (IKL). He was a presidential elector in the 1931, 1937, 1940 and 1943 presidential elections. He participated in the Finnish Civil War on the White side.
