= Heikki Jalonen =

Finnish politician (1865–1932)

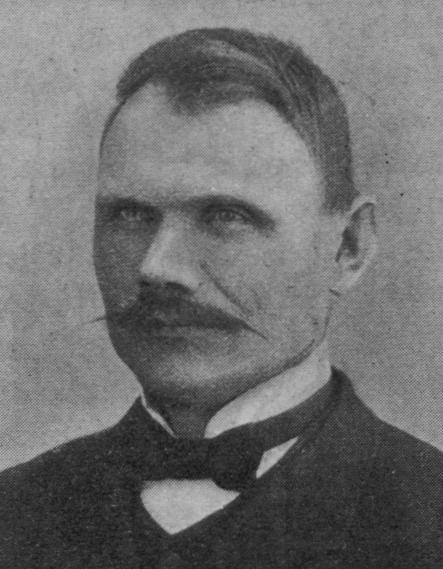
Heikki Jalonen in 1911

Heikki Herman Jalonen (11 February 1865 – 22 October 1932) was a Finnish politician, born in Tyrvää. He was a member of the Parliament of Finland from 1911 to 1918, representing the Social Democratic Party of Finland (SDP). During the Finnish Civil War of 1918, he was a member of the Central Workers' Council of Finland, the legislature of the Finnish Socialist Workers' Republic. After the defeat of the Red side, Jalonen went into exile in Soviet Russia. He joined the Communist Party of Finland (SKP), founded in Moscow by political exiles on 29 August 1918.
