= Kaarlo Kares =

Finnish politician (b. 1873, d. 1942)

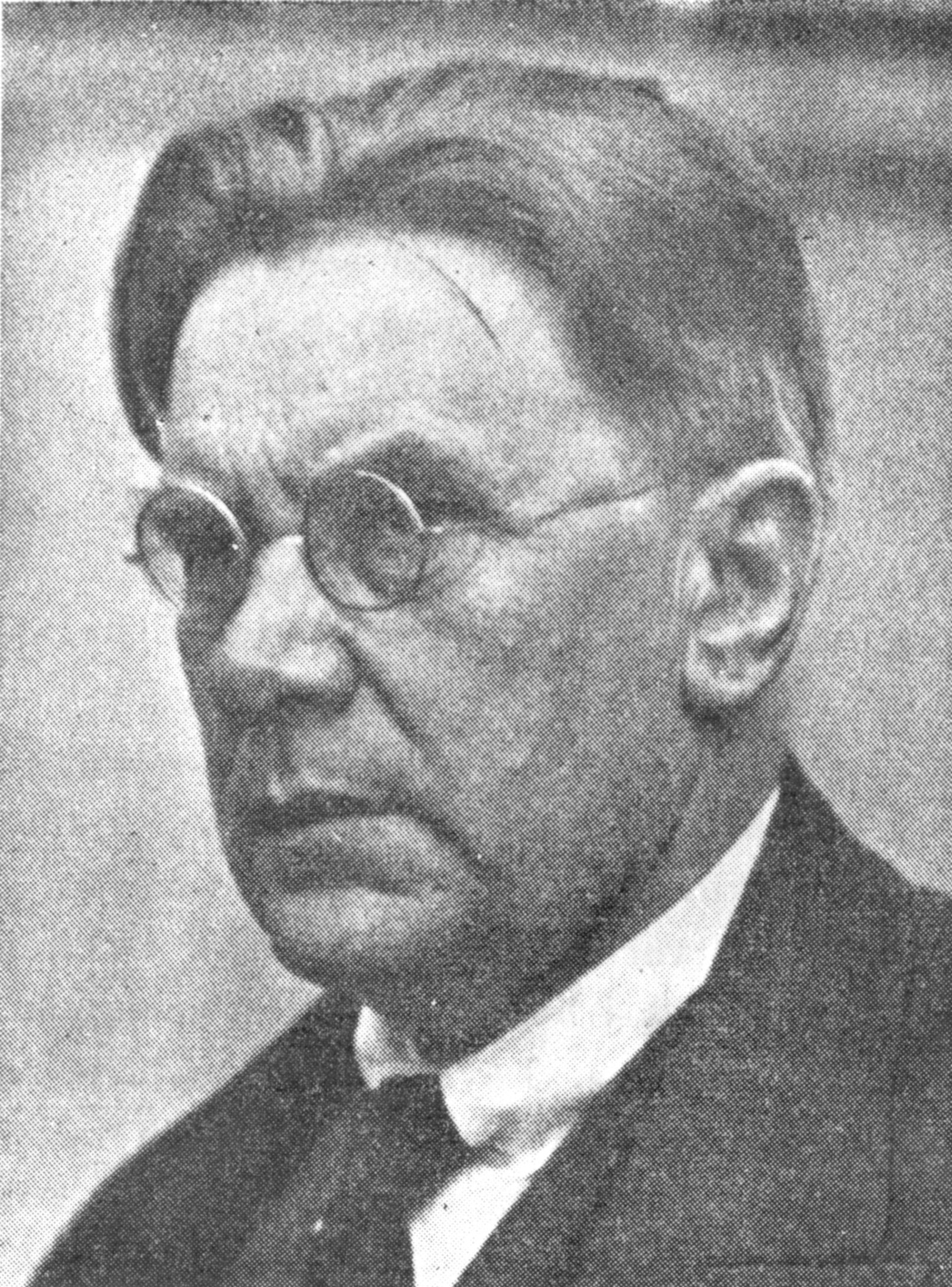
K. R. Kares

Karl Fredrik (Kaarlo Reetrikki) Kares (14 December 1873, in Nakkila – 23 March 1942; surname until 1876 Präski) was a Finnish Lutheran Vicar of Lapua and politician. He was a member of the Parliament of Finland, representing the Finnish Party from 1907 to 1910, the National Coalition Party from 1922 to 1927 and the Patriotic People's Movement (IKL) from 1933 until his death in 1942.

== Views ==
Kares welcomed Nazi Germany and openly supported the views of the German Christian movement, the Nazi ecclesiastical cover organization. According to him, with the Nazis, "new refreshing winds were blowing in the German church".

Kares was also antisemitic, claiming that the persecution of the Jews was due to their actions. Kares considered the Jews as whole rich and lacking in God’s blessing. According to him, the antichrist was also a Jew.
