= Olavi Nikkilä =

Finnish politician (1922–2014)

Olavi Allan Nikkilä (12 April 1922, Sääksmäki - 15 June 2014) was a Finnish agronomist, farmer and politician. He was a member of the Parliament of Finland from 1966 to 1975 and again from 1979 to 1983, representing the National Coalition Party.
