= Sulo Teittinen =

Finnish politician

Sulo Johannes Teittinen (3 July 1882, Juva – 11 August 1964) was a Finnish engineer, civil servant, farmer and politician. He was a Member of the Parliament of Finland from 1939 to 1948, representing the National Progressive Party.
