= Ilkka Viljanen =

Finnish politician

Ilkka Antero Viljanen (born 12 December 1960 in Lahti) is a Finnish politician. He was a member of the Parliament of Finland from 2007 to 2011, representing the National Coalition Party.
