= Ensio Partanen =

Finnish Lutheran pastor and politician (1910–2000)

Vilho Ensio Partanen (1 June 1910 – 3 January 2000) was a Finnish Lutheran pastor and politician, born in Lahti. He was a member of the Parliament of Finland from 1958 to 1970, representing the Social Democratic Party of Finland (SDP). He was a presidential elector in the 1962 and 1968 presidential elections.
