= Rope Kojonen =

Finnish educator and politician (1874–1931)

Robert (Rope) Kojonen (1 August 1874 – 10 June 1931) was a Finnish educator and politician, born in Iitti. He was a member of the Parliament of Finland from 1919 to 1922, representing the National Progressive Party.
