= Matti Viljanen =

Finnish politician (1937–2015)

Matti Juhani Viljanen (25 May 1937 – 4 May 2015) was a Finnish engineer and politician, born in Lahti. He was a member of the Parliament of Finland from 1979 to 1991, representing the National Coalition Party.
