= Otto Toivonen =

Finnish politician (1884–1977)

Otto Toivonen (27 March 1884 – 16 February 1977) was a Finnish politician, born in Urjala. He was a member of the Parliament of Finland from 1916 to 1917, from 1922 to 1929, from 1933 to 1945 and from 1951 to 1954, representing the Social Democratic Party of Finland (SDP). He was a presidential elector in the 1925, 1931, 1937, 1940, 1943, 1950 and 1956 presidential elections.
