= Lauri Mäkelä =

Finnish farmer and politician (1885–1947)

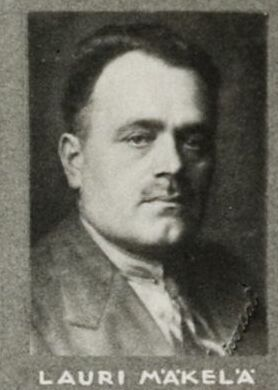
Mäkelä in the early 1930s

Jalmari Lauri Mäkelä (12 October 1885 – 7 June 1947) was a Finnish farmer and politician, born in Urjala. He was a member of the Parliament of Finland from 1930 to 1933, representing the National Coalition Party.
