= Erkki Mohell =

Finnish Lutheran pastor, lawyer and politician (1917–1973)

Erkki William (Erkki W.) Mohell (26 September 1917 – 14 October 1973) was a Finnish Lutheran pastor, lawyer and politician, born in Savonlinna. He was a member of the Parliament of Finland from 1952 to 1958, representing the Social Democratic Party of Finland (SDP). He was a presidential elector in the 1956 Finnish presidential election.
