= Kaino Haapanen =

Finnish politician (1911–1986)

Kaino Mainio Haapanen (15 November 1911 – 22 April 1986) was a Finnish politician, born in Jokioinen. He was a member of the Parliament of Finland from 1951 to 1970 and from 1974 to 1975, representing the Finnish People's Democratic League (SKDL). He was a presidential elector in the 1956, 1962 and 1968 presidential elections.
