= Eino Lottanen =

Finnish farmer and politician (1909–1995)

Eino Henrik Lottanen (29 June 1909 – 25 April 1995) was a Finnish farmer and politician, born in Antrea. He was a member of the Parliament of Finland from 1966 to 1975, representing the Centre Party. He was a presidential elector in the 1962 and 1968 presidential elections.
