= Hulda Salmi =

Finnish politician

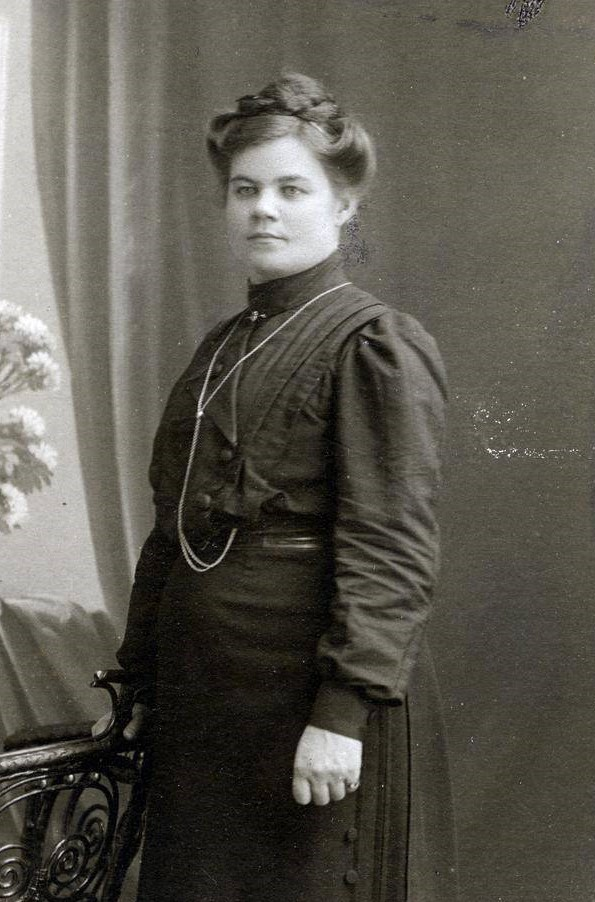
Salmi circa 1910

Hulda Salmi (5 April 1879 – 8 April 1949) was a Finnish schoolteacher and politician, born in Nastola. She was a Member of the Parliament of Finland from 1910 to 1918, representing the Social Democratic Party of Finland (SDP). She was imprisoned from 1918 to 1921 for having sided with the Reds during the Finnish Civil War.
