= Kirsi Ojansuu =

Finnish politician

Kirsi Johanna Ojansuu (born 15 December 1963) is a Finnish politician and member of the Finnish Parliament, representing the Green League. She was first elected to parliament in 1999. In 2021 she became a temporary priest in Helsinki.

== Life ==
Ojansuu was born in Kemijärvi, Finland. She has a master's degree in education from the University of Tampere.

She was first elected to parliament in 1999. Since 1993 she has also been a member of the city council of Hämeenlinna.

In 2008 sje decided to renew her aspirations to be a priest. She started to study theology at university in 2012.

In 2021 she was elected to be a temporary priest until 2023 for the parish of Malmi in Helsinki. An application was made for her to be ordained.

== Private life ==
She is married to Johannes Ojansuu and they have three children, Matvei (b. 1988), Aatos (b. 1991), and Simona (b. 1995).
