= Otto Marttila =

Finnish politician (1879–1955)

Otto Verner Marttila (30 December 1879 – 20 March 1955) was a Finnish farmer and politician, born in Janakkala. He was a member of the Parliament of Finland from 1911 to 1917, from 1922 to 1924, from 1929 to 1930 and from 1933 to 1939, representing the Social Democratic Party of Finland (SDP).
