= Juho Astala =

Finnish politician

Juho Kustaa Astala (17 September 1860 – 25 December 1936) was a Finnish farmer and politician, born in Urjala. He was a member of the Diet of Finland from 1904 to 1906 and of the Parliament of Finland from 1910 to 1913 and from 1918 to 1919. He represented the Young Finnish Party until 1918 and the National Progressive Party from 1918 to 1919.
