= Väinö Nieminen =

Finnish agronomist, farmer and politician (1898–1979)

Väinö Erkki Nieminen (24 January 1898 – 5 August 1979) was a Finnish agronomist, farmer and politician, born in Helsinki. He was a member of the Parliament of Finland from 1958 to 1966, representing the National Coalition Party.
