= Lyyli Aalto =

Finnish accountant and politician (1916–1990)

Lyyli Helena Aalto (6 April 1916 – 26 September 1990; née Lyylilä, former surname Fält) was a Finnish accountant and politician, born in Ypäjä. She was a member of the Parliament of Finland from 1958 to 1979, representing the Social Democratic Party of Finland (SDP). She was a presidential elector in the 1962 and 1982 presidential elections.
