= Evert Hokkanen =

Finnish politician (1864–1918)

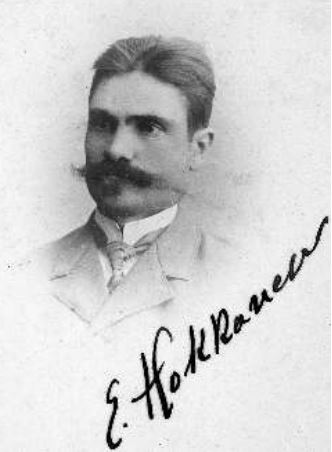

Evert Hokkanen (7 July 1864 in Urjala – 26 June 1918 in Hämeenlinna) was a Finnish farmworker and politician. He was a member of the Parliament of Finland from 1907 to 1910, representing the Social Democratic Party of Finland (SDP). He was imprisoned in 1918 for having sided with the Reds during the Finnish Civil War. He died in detention.
