= Aino Malkamäki =

Finnish politician (1894–1961)

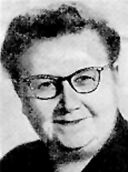
Aino Malkamäki

Aino Elin Malkamäki (née Sommarberg; 1 April 1894 in Iitti – 17 October 1961) was a Finnish schoolteacher and politician. She was Minister of Social Affairs from 2 September to 29 November 1957 and a member of the Parliament of Finland from 1922 to 1929, from 1933 to 1958 and from 1960 until her death in 1961. She belonged at first to the Social Democratic Party of Finland (SDP) and later to the Social Democratic Union of Workers and Smallholders (TPSL).
