= Leo Häppölä =

Finnish farmer and politician (1911–1998)

Leo Kustaa Häppölä (1 February 1911, Tuulos – 3 July 1998) was a Finnish farmer and politician. He served as Minister of Defence from 13 January 1959 to 14 August 1961. Häppölä was a Member of the Parliament of Finland from 1951 to 1970, representing the Agrarian League, which renamed itself the Centre Party in 1965.
