= Olli Aulanko =

Finnish politician (1921–1964)

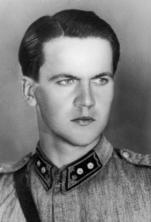
Olli Aulanko

Olli Sakari Aulanko (30 August 1921 – 30 April 1964) was a Finnish politician, born in Helsinki. He was a member of the Parliament of Finland from 1958 until his death in 1964, representing the National Coalition Party. He was a presidential elector in the 1956 and 1962 presidential elections. He served as an officer in the Finnish Armoured Division during the Continuation War (1941–1944) and was decorated with a Mannerheim Cross. He died of a heart attack.
