= Oskari Väre =

Finnish smallholder and politician (1884–1946)

Kalle Oskari Väre (9 July 1884 – 3 July 1946) was a Finnish smallholder and politician, born in Tammela. He was a member of the Parliament of Finland from 1919 to 1922, representing the Social Democratic Party of Finland (SDP).
