= Ulla Juurola =

Finnish social worker, civil servant, and politician (1942–2019)

Ulla-Maija Juurola (née Harkki; born 15 June 1942 in Kuorevesi–25 June 2019) was a Finnish social worker, civil servant and politician. She was a member of the Parliament of Finland from 1995 to 2003, representing the Social Democratic Party of Finland (SDP).
