= Helge Talvitie =

Finnish politician (born 1941)

Helge Jorma Johannes Talvitie (born 23 July 1941 in Ylistaro) is a Finnish sheet metal worker and politician. He was a Member of the Parliament of Finland from 1975 to 1979, representing the Finnish People's Democratic League (SKDL).
