= Lasse Äikäs =

Finnish politician

Lasse Taisto Äikäs (26 January 1932 in Kuolemajärvi – 12 June 1988) was a Finnish lawyer, civil servant and politician. He served as Minister of Defence from 26 May 1979 to 18 February 1982. He was a member of the Parliament of Finland from 1975 to 1983, representing the Centre Party.
