= Väinö Mäkinen =

Finnish engineer and politician (1915–1983)

Väinö Oskari (V. O.) Mäkinen (25 January 1915 – 9 April 1983) was a Finnish engineer and politician, born in Hämeenlinna. He was a member of the Parliament of Finland from 1966 to 1975, representing the Social Democratic Party of Finland (SDP). Mäkinen was the mayor of Riihimäki from 1962 to 1974. He was a presidential elector in the 1968 presidential election.
