= Oskari Jalava =

Finnish politician (1876–1950)

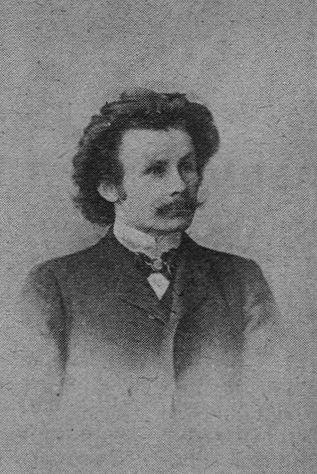

Juha Oskari Jalava (7 July 1876, Huittinen – 10 March 1950) was a Finnish plater and politician. He was a Member of the Parliament of Finland from 1907 to 1910 and again from 1911 to 1918, representing the Social Democratic Party of Finland (SDP). He was imprisoned from 1918 to 1923 for having sided with the Reds during the Finnish Civil War. He was again imprisoned during the 1920s on sedition charges. From 1929 to 1930, he was active in the short-lived Left Group of Finnish Workers.
