= Jalmari Viljanen =

Johan Hjalmar (Jalmari) Viljanen (15 August 1872 – 12 September 1928) was a Finnish farmer and politician, born in Nastola. At first active in the Finnish Party, he was a member of the Parliament of Finland from 1922 to 1924, representing the National Coalition Party.
