= Alma Jokinen =

Finnish politician

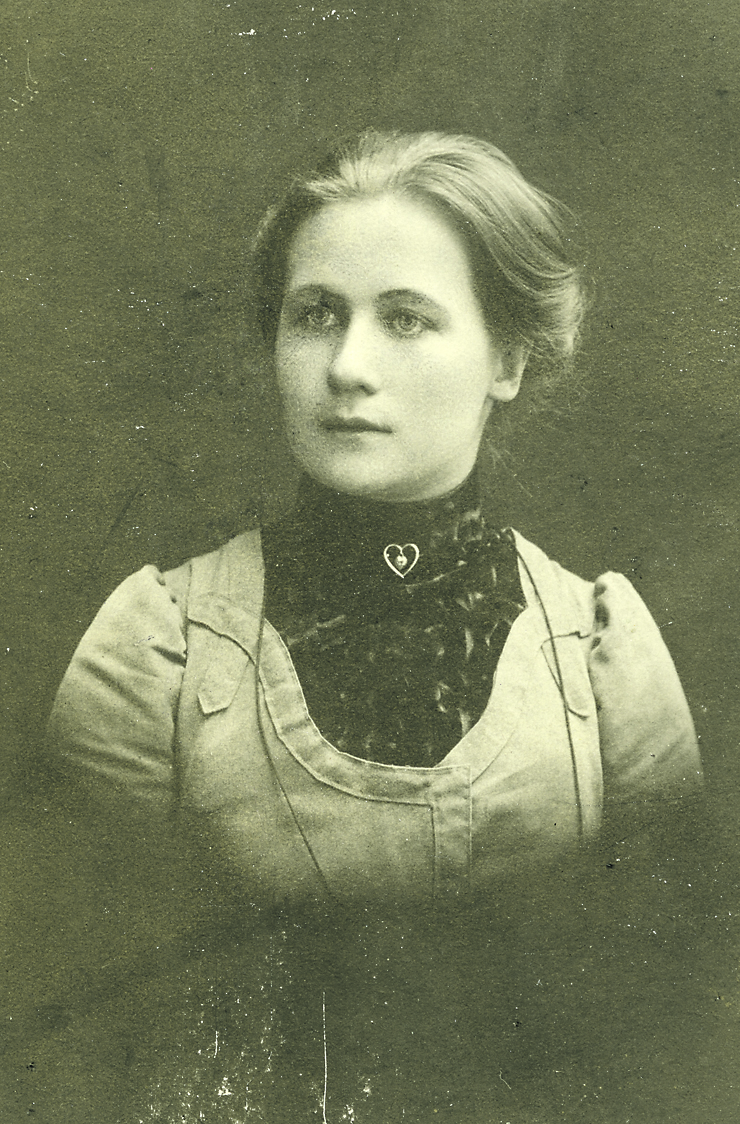
Alma Jokinen (1882–1939))

Alma Eufrosyne Jokinen (née Malander; 28 April 1882 - 1939) was a Finnish politician, born in Tampere. She was a member of the Parliament of Finland from 1908 to 1918, representing the Social Democratic Party of Finland (SDP). In 1918, during the Finnish Civil War, she sided with the Reds. When the Finnish Socialist Workers' Republic collapsed, she fled to Soviet Russia. She settled later in Petrozavodsk, in the Karelian ASSR, where she died in 1939. She was married to Finnish journalist and MP Väinö E. Jokinen, who was killed during the Kuusinen Club Incident in Petrograd on August 31, 1920.
