= Martti Suntela =

Finnish politician

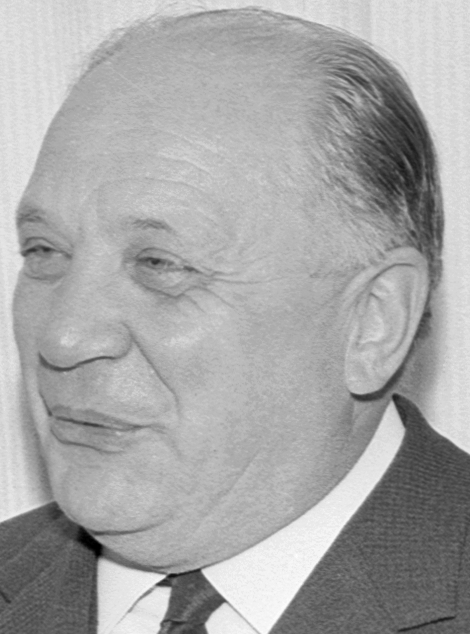
Martti Suntela

Martti Johannes Suntela (3 January 1903 in Padasjoki – 21 July 1999) was a Finnish agronomist, farmer and politician who was a member of the Parliament of Finland from 1948 to 1951, representing the Agrarian League.
