= Lauri Yrjö-Koskinen =

Finnish politician

Baron Lauri Almos Yrjö-Koskinen (2 March 1867 – 30 April 1936) was a Finnish landowner and politician, born in Helsinki. He was a Member of the Parliament of Finland from 1911 to 1913, representing the Finnish Party.
