= Ulla Puolanne =

Finnish politician (1931–2015)

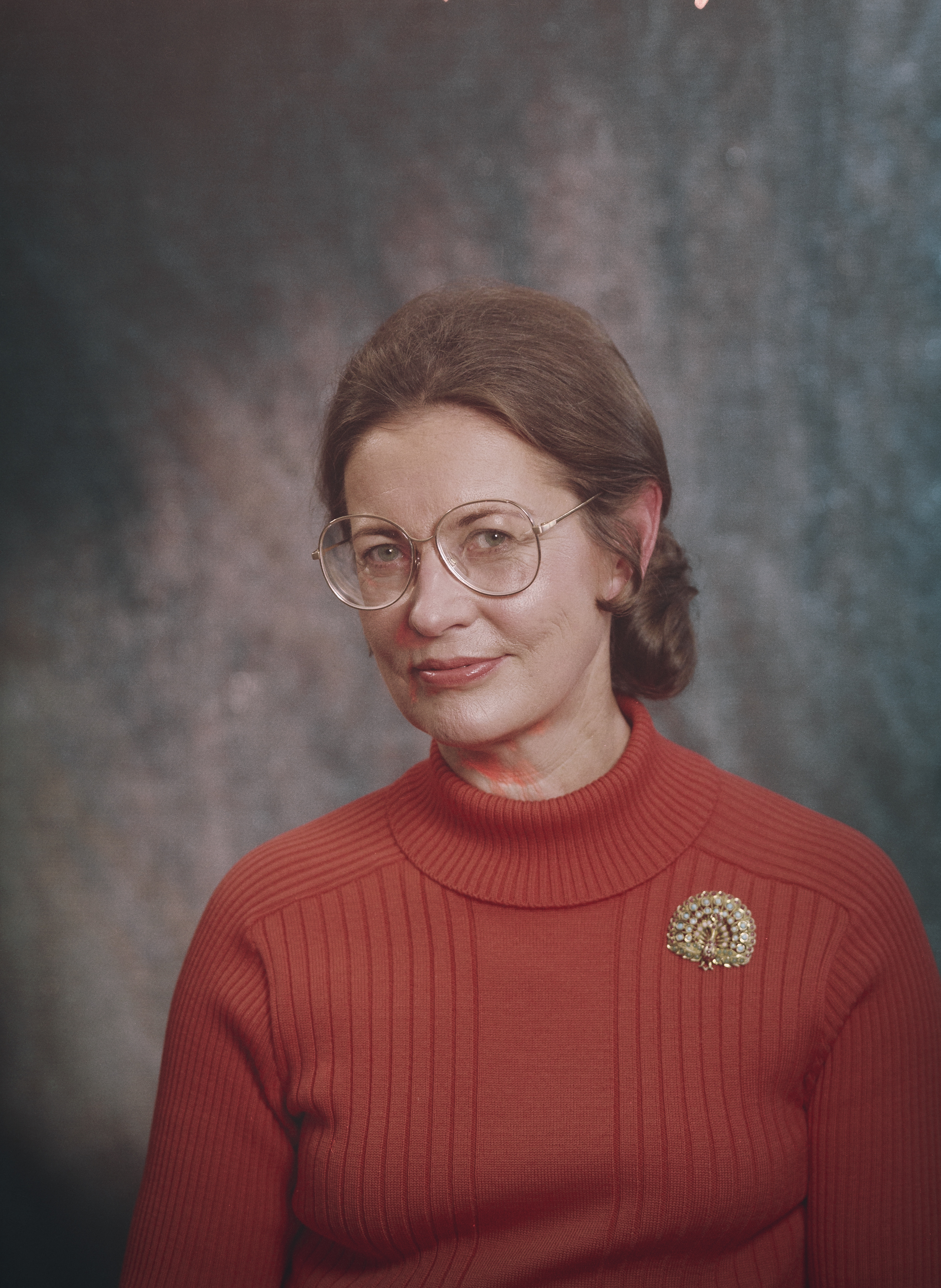

Deputy Minister of Finance
- In office 30 May 1987 – 26 May 1991
- Prime Minister: Harri Holkeri

Personal details
- Born: 28 June 1931 Lahti, Finland
- Died: 26 September 2015 (aged 84) Lahti, Finland
- Party: National Coalition Party
- Education: Helsinki School of Economics

Ulla Kaija Puolanne (28 June 1931 – 26 September 2015) was a Finnish politician who served as Deputy Minister of Finance from 1987 to 1991. Born in Lahti, she graduated from the Helsinki School of Economics in 1954 and afterwards worked in finance in an engineering office. Puolanne first got involved in politics in 1969 when she was elected to Lahti City Council. Six years later she was elected to the Parliament of Finland in the 1975 elections as a member of the National Coalition Party. She served as a member of Parliament until 1991, and was primarily part of the Banking and Finance Committees.

From 1984 to 1986, Puolanne became chair of the National Coalition Party's parliamentary group, the first woman to hold the position. In 1987, she was nominated to the position of Deputy Minister of Finance under Erkki Liikanen. Her primary focus as deputy minister was tax reform, primarily reducing income tax and expanding the country's tax base. She retired from politics after her term ended in 1991. Puolinen was awarded the Lahti medal twice in 1995 and 2005, and in 2002 she was named an honorary Minister for Political Affairs.
