= Artturi H. Virkkunen =

Finnish historian, journalist and politician (1864–1924)

Artturi Heikki (A. H.) Virkkunen (18 January 1864 – 17 November 1924; surname until 1906 Snellman) was a Finnish historian, journalist and politician, born in Karunki. He was a member of the Parliament of Finland from 1907 to 1909, from 1910 to 1911 and from 1913 to 1922, representing the Finnish Party until December 1918 and the National Coalition Party after that.
