= Yrjö Leiwo =

Finnish politician

Yrjö Kalervo Leiwo (12 February 1884, in Kuhmalahti – 12 January 1964) was a Finnish journalist, bank director and politician. At first active in the Finnish Party, he was later elected to the Parliament of Finland from 1930 to 1936 as a representative of the National Coalition Party.
