= Alfred Retulainen =

Finnish politician

Alfred Retulainen (5 March 1860 in Tyrväntö – 11 November 1929) was a Finnish farmer and politician. He was a Member of the Parliament of Finland, representing the Finnish Party from 1913 to 1918 and the National Coalition Party from 1918 to 1919.
