= Evert Nukari =

Finnish farmer and politician (1890–1973)

Gustaf Evert (Kustaa Evert) Nukari (14 April 1874 – 17 March 1944) was a Finnish farmer and politician, born in Hämeenlinnan maalaiskunta. He was a member of the Parliament of Finland from 1924 to 1930, representing the National Coalition Party.
