= Timo Mäki =

Finnish jurist and politician (1914–1985)

Timo Ilmari Mäki (24 September 1914 – 19 December 1985) was a Finnish jurist and politician, born in Tampere. He was a member of the Parliament of Finland from 1964 to 1979, representing the National Coalition Party. He was a presidential elector in the 1956, 1962 and 1968 presidential elections.
