= Osmo Kock =

Finnish politician (1929–1994)

Osmo Olavi Kock (September 14, 1929, Hollola - September 15, 1994, Lahti) was a Finnish politician. Kock was Finnish People's Democratic League Member of Parliament between 1966-1970 and 1972–1974. He was member of Lahti City Council. Kock left Parliament when he became Finnish Ambassador to East Germany, where he worked from 1974 to 1979. Later, he was Ambassador to Algeria from 1979 to 1983 and to Romania from 1987 to 1990.

Kock was elected as a member of the Southern constituency of the Häme County. In parliament he was member of Legal Affairs Committee and constitutional committee. In the second law committee, Kock was also chairman. He was also a member of the Finnish delegation to the Nordic Council.

Kock graduated in 1949, became a lawyer in 1959 and a bachelor of law in 1965. He worked as Executive Director of the Finland-Poland Association in 1951–1958, as a bank clerk in 1959 and as a lawyer in 1959–1961.

Between 1961 and 1971, Kocka served as Assistant Secretary for City of Lahti and from 1971 to 1974 as Director General of the Social and Health Department of the State Provincial Office of Kymi.

In addition to People's Democratic League, Kock influenced numerous other organizations. In 1949 he joined the Communist Party of Finland . Kock belonged to the Central Committee of the Communist Party (1969-1970, deputy from 1966 to 1969 and 1970 to 1972) and led the party's Lahti District Committee. The dummy also had positions of trust in the Finnish-Polish Association, the Criminal Service, the Lahti Consumers' co-operative, the National Workers' Savings Bank, the Consortium of Consumers' Cooperatives, and the co-operative Wholesale store.
