= Eero Salo =

Finnish politician

Eero Emil Kössi Salo (4 July 1921, Hämeenlinna – 13 October 1975) was a Finnish politician. He was a Member of the Parliament of Finland from 1968 until his death in 1975, representing the Social Democratic Party of Finland (SDP).
