= Erkki Huurtamo =

Finnish jurist and politician (1917–1999)

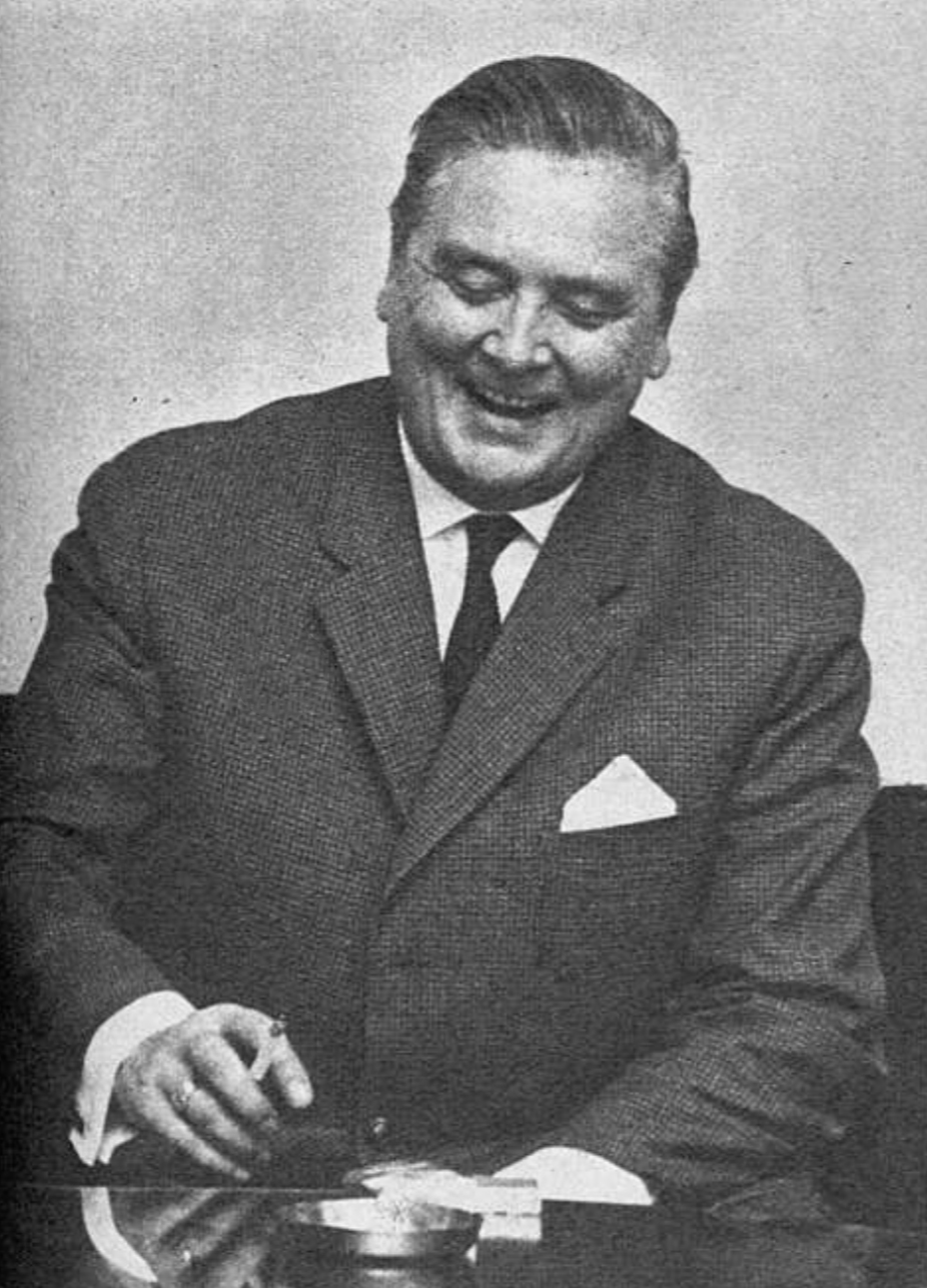
Huurtamo in 1968

Erkki Kalervo Huurtamo (11 February 1917 – 2 April 1999; surname until 1935 Höydén) was a Finnish jurist and politician, born in Hollola. He was a member of the Parliament of Finland from 1962 to 1975, representing the National Coalition Party. He served as Deputy Minister of Finance from 12 September 1964 to 27 May 1966 and as Minister of Defence from 13 June to 30 November 1975. Huurtamo was the governor of Kymi Province from 1975 to 1984. He was a presidential elector in the 1968 Finnish presidential election.
