= Eino Kujanpää =

Finnish politician (1904–1980)

Eino Nikolai Kujanpää (16 January 1904 - 11 June 1980; original surname Syrjänen) was a Finnish construction worker and politician. He was born in Tammela. He became a communist as a young man and in the late 1920s he went to the Soviet Union, where he studied at the International Lenin School and at the Communist University of the National Minorities of the West. He returned to Finland in 1936, was soon arrested and spent the years 1937 to 1940 and 1941 to 1944 in prison for political reasons. He was freed in 1944, when the Communist Party of Finland (SKP) was legalised as a result of the Moscow Armistice of 19 September 1944. He was then elected to the Parliament of Finland, where he represented the Finnish People's Democratic League (SKDL) from 1945 to 1951.
