= Eero Antikainen =

Finnish politician and trade union leader

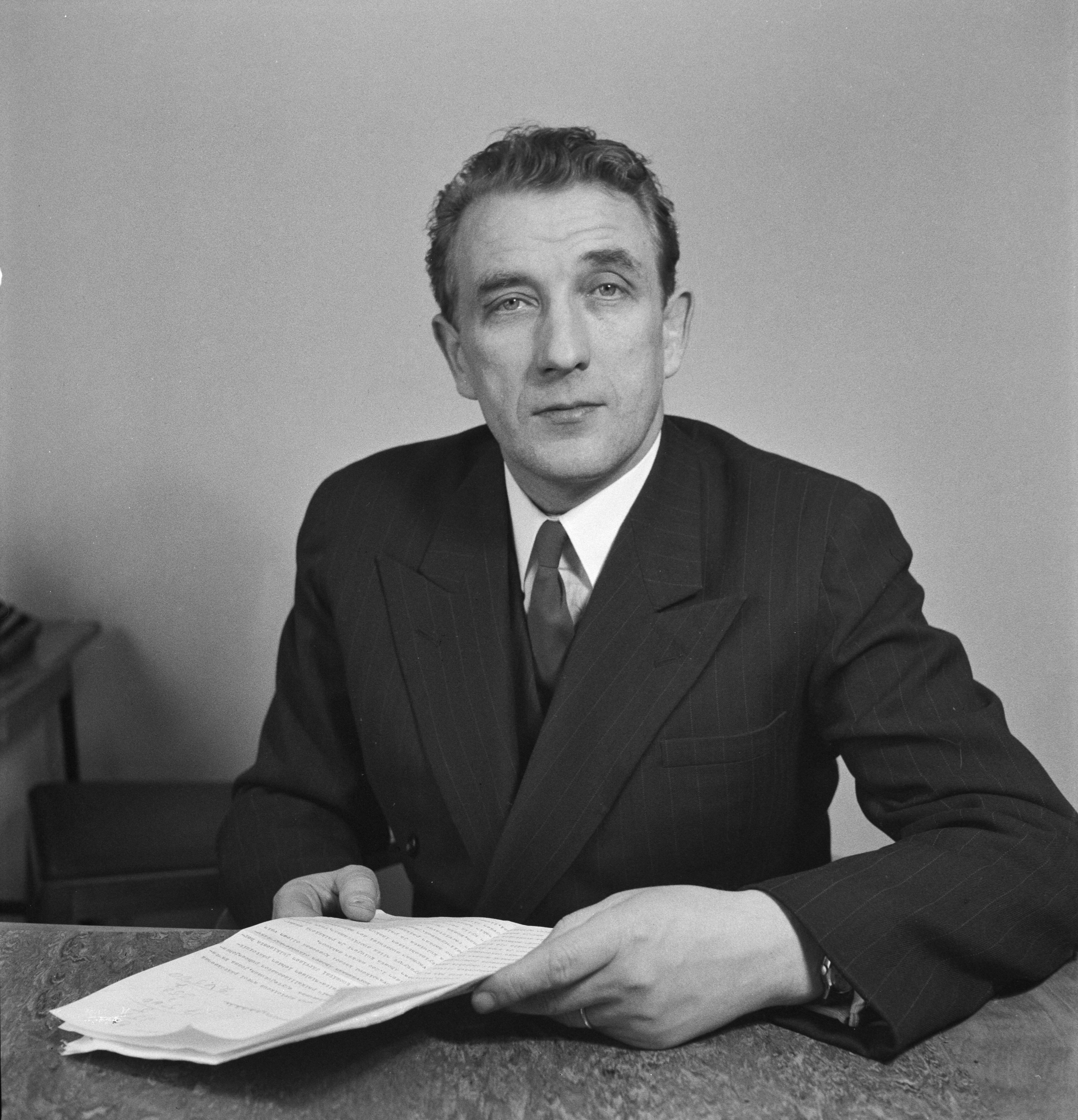
Eero Antikainen in 1951

Eero Antikainen (5 January 1906 - 29 January 1960) was a Finnish sawmill worker, trade union leader and politician, born in Vehmersalmi. He served as Deputy Minister of Transport and Public Works from 26 April to 29 August 1958. He was a member of the Parliament of Finland from 1951 to 1955, representing the Social Democratic Party of Finland (SDP). He later joined the Social Democratic Union of Workers and Smallholders (TPSL). He was the chairman of the Finnish Federation of Trade Unions (SAK) from 1954 to 1958.
