= Lauri Sariola =

Finnish farmer, journalist and politician (1916–1970)

Lauri Arthur (Artturi) Sariola (3 August 1887 – 7 February 1940; original surname Sarlin) was a Finnish farmer, journalist and politician, born in Humppila. He was a member of the Parliament of Finland from 1929 to 1930 and again from 1933 to 1939, representing the Agrarian League (ML). He was a presidential elector in the 1931.
