= Mikko Vainio =

Finnish politician

Mikko Ilmari Vainio (15 October 1923 in Mäntsälä – 12 November 2017) was a Finnish politician. He was a member of the Parliament of Finland from 1970 to 1975 and again from 1983 to 1987, representing the Finnish Rural Party (SMP).

He died on 12 November 2017 in Lahti at the age of 94.
