= List of members of the Parliament of Finland, 1922–1924 =

This is the list of the members of the Parliament of Finland between September 5, 1922 – April 30, 1924 following the parliamentary election in 1922.

== Members of the Parliament 1922–1924 ==
In the table, the names written with italics were appointed to the Parliament later than September 5, 1922—the first day of the new Parliament—to replace those who had died or resigned.

English name	Finnish / Swedish name	Seats
Social Democratic Party	Suomen Sosialidemokraattinen Puolue, Finlands socialdemokratiska parti	53
Agrarian League	Maalaisliitto, Agrarförbundet	45
National Coalition Party	Kansallinen Kokoomus, Samlingspartiet	35
Socialist Workers' Party	Suomen Sosialistinen Työväenpuolue, Finlands socialistiska arbetarparti	27
Swedish People's Party	Ruotsalainen kansanpuolue, Svenska folkpartiet	25
National Progressive Party	Kansallinen Edistyspuolue. Framstegspartiet	15

Name	Born	Sex	Parliamentary group	Constituency	Notes	Source
Aalto, Artturi	1876	M	Social Democratic Party	Uusimaa		
Ahlfors, Fanny	1884	F	Social Democratic Party	Turku North		
Airamo, Elin	1886	F	Socialist Workers Party	Uusimaa	(Note: Elin Airamo was imprisoned, removed from office on October 17, 1923)	
Alestalo, Anshelm	1880	M	Agrarian League	Turku North	(Note: Anshelm Alestalo replaced Bjarne Westermarck on February 13, 1923)	
Ampuja, Mikko	1882	M	Social Democratic Party	Uusimaa		
Anderson, Amos	1878	M	Swedish People's Party	Turku South		
Arhama, Kusti	1885	M	Agrarian League	Oulu South		
Aromaa, Juho	1878	M	Social Democratic Party	Turku North		
Aronen, Toivo	1886	M	Socialist Workers Party	Turku North	(Note: Toivo Aronen was imprisoned, removed from office on October 17, 1923)	
Aspelin, Arthur	1868	M	National Progressive Party	Lapinmaa		
Bengs, Johannes	1877	M	Swedish People's Party	Vaasa South		
Bergroth, Waldemar	1852	M	National Coalition Party	Turku South		
von Born, Ernst	1885	M	Swedish People's Party	Uusimaa		
Broända, Johan	1866	M	Swedish People's Party	Vaasa North		
Bryggari, Tuomas	1881	M	Social Democratic Party	Vaasa East		
Bäck, Immanuel	1876	M	Swedish People's Party	Vaasa South		
Colliander, Rafael	1878	M	Swedish People's Party	Turku South		
Enqvist, Jaakko	1877	M	Socialist Workers Party	Oulu North	(Note: Jaakko Enqvist was imprisoned, removed from office on October 17, 1923)	
Erich, Rafael	1879	M	National Coalition Party	Mikkeli		
Eronen, Oliver	1865	M	Social Democratic Party	Mikkeli		
Eskola, Valfrid	1889	M	Social Democratic Party	Häme North		
Estlander, Ernst	1870	M	Swedish People's Party	Vaasa South		
Furuhjelm, Annie	1859	F	Swedish People's Party	Uusimaa		
Furuhjelm, Ragnar	1879	M	Swedish People's Party	Uusimaa		
Hakkila, Väinö	1882	M	Social Democratic Party	Uusimaa		
Halonen, Toivo	1893	M	Social Democratic Party	Mikkeli		
Hannula, Mandi	1880	F	National Progressive Party	Mikkeli		
Hannula, Väinö	1893	M	Socialist Workers Party	Turku South	(Note: Väinö Hannula was imprisoned, removed from office on October 17, 1923)	
Hannunen, Hilda	1882	F	Socialist Workers Party	Vaasa South	(Note: Hilda Hannunen moved to Soviet Union, removed from office on October 17, 1923)	
Harvala, Kaarlo	1885	M	Social Democratic Party	Häme North		
Hatva, Eero	1872	M	Agrarian League	Kuopio West		
Hautamäki, Kustaa	1869	M	Agrarian League	Oulu South		
Haverinen, Anna	1884	F	Social Democratic Party	Viipuri West		
Heikinheimo, Oskari	1873	M	National Coalition Party	Vaasa East		
Helenelund, Edvard	1885	M	Swedish People's Party	Vaasa South		
Hiidenheimo, Artturi	1877	M	National Coalition Party	Uusimaa		
Hiilos, Frans	1891	M	Socialist Workers Party	Viipuri West	(Note: Frans Hiilos was imprisoned, removed from office on October 17, 1923)	
Hirvensalo, Gabriel	1880	M	National Progressive Party	Kuopio West		
Hirvensalo, Olli	1882	M	Agrarian League	Kuopio West		
Holsti, Rudolf	1881	M	National Progressive Party	Viipuri West	(Note: Resignation of Rudolf Holsti was accepted on April 10, 1923)	
Honkavaara, Ville	1880	M	Agrarian League	Viipuri West		
Hultin, Tekla	1864	F	National Coalition Party	Viipuri West		
Huotari, Anni	1874	F	Social Democratic Party	Uusimaa		
Huttunen, Evert	1884	M	Social Democratic Party	Viipuri West	(Note: Evert Huttunen died March 29, 1924)	
Hyvönen, Juho	1891	M	Agrarian League	Kuopio West		
Härmä, Frans	1881	M	National Coalition Party	Turku North		
Härmä, Laura	1891	F	Socialist Workers Party	Turku South	(Note: Laura Härmä was imprisoned, removed from office on October 17, 1923)	
Hästbacka, Emil	1872	M	Swedish People's Party	Vaasa North		
Ikonen, Toivo	1891	M	National Progressive Party	Viipuri East		
Inborr, Johannes	1867	M	Swedish People's Party	Vaasa North		
Ingman, Lauri	1868	M	National Coalition Party	Turku North		
Itkonen, Rieti	1889	M	Social Democratic Party	Kuopio East		
Jaskari, Aaro	1880	M	National Progressive Party	Vaasa East		
Jaskari, Mikko	1866	M	National Coalition Party	Vaasa North		
Jeppson, Oskar	1878	M	Swedish People's Party	Vaasa South		
Jern, Levi	1893	M	Swedish People's Party	Vaasa South		
Joukahainen, Vilkku	1879	M	Agrarian League	Viipuri West		
Junes, Antti	1874	M	Agrarian League	Oulu North		
Junnila, Taave	1869	M	National Coalition Party	Turku North		
Jussila, Oskari	1888	M	National Coalition Party	Oulu North		
Juutilainen, Antti	1882	M	Agrarian League	Viipuri East		
Järvinen, Kyösti	1869	M	National Coalition Party	Uusimaa		
Kaarne, Antti	1875	M	Socialist Workers Party	Turku South	(Note: Antti Kaarne was arrested, removed from office on October 17, 1923)	
Kaila, Erkki	1867	M	National Coalition Party	Uusimaa		
Kallio, Albert	1884	M	Socialist Workers Party	Uusimaa	(Note: Albert Kallio was removed from office on October 17, 1923)	
Kallio, Kyösti	1873	M	Agrarian League	Oulu South		
Kalliokoski, Viljami	1894	M	Agrarian League	Vaasa North		
Kankari, Kalle	1889	M	Socialist Workers Party	Uusimaa	(Note: Kalle Kankari was imprisoned, removed from office on October 17, 1923)	
Kankkunen, Juho	1860	M	Agrarian League	Kuopio East		
Kanniainen, Juho	1875	M	Agrarian League	Oulu North		
Kares, Kaarlo	1873	M	National Coalition Party	Häme South		
Kauranen, Jooseppi	1880	M	Agrarian League	Viipuri East		
Kemppi, Pekka	1887	M	Socialist Workers Party	Oulu South	(Note: Pekka Kemppi was imprisoned, removed from office on October 17, 1923)	
Keto, Jaakko	1884	M	Social Democratic Party	Häme South		
Kilpeläinen, Edvard	1879	M	National Coalition Party	Viipuri West		
Kirra, Kalle	1893	M	Agrarian League	Turku North		
Kivialho, Kaaperi	1884	M	National Progressive Party	Viipuri West	(Note: Kaaperi Kivialho replaced Rudolf Holsti on October 17, 1923)	
Kivilinna, Väinö	1875	M	Agrarian League	Turku South		
Koivisto, Aukusti	1884	M	Socialist Workers Party	Oulu North	(Note: Aukusti Koivisto was arrested, removed from office on October 17, 1923)	
Koivulahti-Lehto, Hilma	1881	F	Social Democratic Party	Vaasa East		
Koivuranta, Janne	1885	M	Agrarian League	Oulu North		
Komu, Yrjö	1890	M	Social Democratic Party	Mikkeli		
Koponen, Albin	1881	M	Social Democratic Party	Kuopio East		
Kopsa, Pekka	1887	M	Agrarian League	Viipuri East		
Korhonen, Janne	1885	M	Social Democratic Party	Viipuri East		
Korhonen, Vilho	1867	M	Social Democratic Party	Turku North		
Kuisma, Antti	1892	M	Agrarian League	Viipuri East		
Kukkonen, Antti	1889	M	Agrarian League	Viipuri East		
Kulenius, Evert	1879	M	Swedish People's Party	Vaasa North		
Kylänpää, Kustaa	1881	M	National Coalition Party	Turku North		
Kärki, Frans	1884	M	Agrarian League	Vaasa South		
Lahdensuo, Jalo	1882	M	Agrarian League	Vaasa North		
Lampinen, Kalle	1894	M	Socialist Workers Party	Vaasa North	(Note: Kalle Lampinen was imprisoned, removed from office on October 17, 1923)	
Landtman, Gunnar	1878	M	Swedish People's Party	Uusimaa		
Latvala, Jaakko	1866	M	Social Democratic Party	Turku South		
Lehikoinen, Antti	1886	M	Social Democratic Party	Kuopio East		
Lehto, Toivo	1891	M	Social Democratic Party	Vaasa East		
Lehtokoski, Aino	1886	F	Social Democratic Party	Turku South		
Leinonen, Olga	1877	F	Social Democratic Party	Häme South		
Lindberg, Julius	1874	M	Swedish People's Party	Uusimaa		
Linna, Eemil	1876	M	National Progressive Party	Häme North		
Lohi, Kalle	1872	M	Agrarian League	Oulu North		
Louhelainen, Arvi	1896	M	Social Democratic Party	Kuopio East		
Loukko, Jaakko	1870	M	Agrarian League	Vaasa North		
Luostarinen, Alpo	1886	M	National Progressive Party	Mikkeli		
Långström, Toivo	1889	M	Socialist Workers Party	Uusimaa	(Note: Toivo Långström was imprisoned, removed from office on October 17, 1923)	
Makkonen, Matti	1879	M	Agrarian League	Kuopio West		
Malkamäki, Aino	1895	F	Social Democratic Party	Mikkeli		
Manner, Albin	1888	M	Agrarian Party	Viipuri East		
Mannermaa, Juho	1871	M	National Coalition Party	Oulu South		
Mantere, Oskari	1874	M	National Progressive Party	Häme South		
Marttila, Otto	1879	M	Social Democratic Party	Häme South		
Mickels, Gustaf	1879	M	Swedish People's Party	Uusimaa		
Miemois, Johannes	1866	M	Swedish People's Party	Vaasa North		
Muhonen, Atte	1888	M	Social Democratic Party	Vaasa East		
Mustakallio, Lauri	1883	M	Agrarian League	Oulu South		
Myllymäki, Kalle	1883	M	Social Democratic Party	Häme South		
Mäkelin, Emmi	1874	F	Socialist Workers Party	Kuopio West	(Note: Emmi Mäkelin was imprisoned, removed from office on October 17, 1923)	
Mäkinen, Heikki	1888	M	Socialist Workers Party	Turku South		
Mäkinen, Wäinö	1882	M	Agrarian League	Viipuri East		
Nahkala, Antti	1877	M	Socialist Workers Party	Oulu South	(Note: Antti Nahkala was imprisoned)	
Nikkanen, Ville	1885	M	National Coalition Party	Viipuri West		
Niskanen, Henrik	1873	M	Agrarian League	Mikkeli		
Niukkanen, Juho	1888	M	Agrarian League	Viipuri East		
Nuora, Aapo	1864	M	National Coalition Party	Viipuri East		
Nurmiranta, Pekka	1887	M	Socialist Workers Party	Kuopio West		
Nyberg, Johannes	1862	M	National Coalition Party	Turku South		
Paasivuori, Matti	1866	M	Social Democratic Party	Viipuri West		
Peltonen, Johannes	1868	M	National Coalition Party	Häme North		
Pennanen, Pekka	1872	M	National Coalition Party	Kuopio East		
Penttilä, Antti	1870	M	National Progressive Party	Turku South		
Perälä, Lauri	1881	M	Agrarian League	Vaasa East		
Pesonen, Aarno	1886	M	Agrarian League	Oulu South		
Pesonen, Matti	1868	M	National Coalition Party	Kuopio West		
Pilkka, Simson	1880	M	Agrarian League	Viipuri West		
Pitkänen, Matti	1885	M	Agrarian League	Viipuri East		
Pojanluoma, Hermanni	1869	M	National Coalition Party	Vaasa		
Puittinen, Matti	1883	M	Social Democratic Party	Kuopio East		
Pulkkinen, Albin	1875	M	National Progressive Party	Mikkeli		
Pulkkinen, Hannes	1885	M	Socialist Workers Party	Kuopio West		
Pulkkinen, Yrjö	1875	M	National Coalition Party	Häme North		
Pullinen, Erkki	1871	M	National Progressive Party	Viipuri East		
Raearo, Emil	1882	M	Social Democratic Party	Vaasa East		
Rannikko, Juho	1873	M	National Coalition Party	Turku South		
Rantala, Viljo	1892	M	Social Democratic Party	Turku North		
Rapo, Jussi	1878	M	Social Democratic Party	Viipuri East		
Reinikainen, Oskari	1885	M	Social Democratic Party	Viipuri West		
Reinikka, Tyko	1887	M	Agrarian League	Kuopio East		
Renvall, Heikki	1872	M	National Coalition Party	Viipuri West		
Roos, Wilhelm	1858	M	Swedish People's Party	Turku South		
Ryti, Risto	1889	M	National Progressive Party	Turku North		
Rytkönen, August	1886	M	Socialist Workers Party	Oulu South	(Note: August Rytkönen was imprisoned, removed from office on October 17, 1923)	
Ryynänen, Juho	1873	M	Agrarian League	Kuopio East		
Ryömä, Hannes	1878	M	Social Democratic Party	Häme North		
Saarinen, Emil	1879	M	Social Democratic Party	Häme North		
Sallila, Emil	1883	M	Social Democratic Party	Uusimaa		
Sallinen, Antti	1879	M	Agrarian League	Kuopio East		
Salo, Sulo	1887	M	Agrarian League	Oulu South		
Sandblom, Frans	1873	M	Swedish People's Party	Uusimaa		
Schauman, Georg	1870	M	Swedish Left (Note: Georg Schauman was nominated by Swedish People's Party, but did not join party's parliamentary group after the election and instead formed Swedish Left parliamentary group (Swedish: Svensk Vänster, Finnish: Ruotsalainen vasemmisto)	Uusimaa		
Seppälä, Hilda	1879	M	Social Democratic Party	Uusimaa		
Seppänen, Jaakko	1881	M	Agrarian League	Oulu South		
Setälä, E. N.	1864	M	National Coalition Party	Viipuri East		
Sillanpää, Miina	1866	F	Social Democratic Party	Turku North		
Sillanpää, Rosa	1888	F	Socialist Workers Party	Häme South	(Note: Rosa Sillanpää was imprisoned, removed from office on October 17, 1923)	
Simelius, Veli Kustaa	1877	M	National Coalition Party	Oulu South		
Sunila, Juho	1875	M	Agrarian League	Häme South		
Svento, Reinhold	1881	M	Social Democratic Party	Mikkeli		
Särkkä, Wille	1877	M	National Progressive Party	Viipuri West		
Tainio, Taavi	1874	M	Social Democratic Party	Kuopio West		
Tanner, Väinö	1881	M	Social Democratic Party	Turku North		
Tanttu, August	1859	M	National Coalition Party	Mikkeli		
Tarkkanen, Mikko	1886	M	Agrarian League	Vaasa South		
Thuneberg, Otto	1865	M	National Coalition Party	Häme North		
Toivonen, Otto	1884	M	Social Democratic Party	Häme South		
Tolonen, Jussi	1882	M	Social Democratic Party	Mikkeli		
Toppinen, Kalle	1892	M	Socialist Workers Party	Kuopio West	(Note: Kalle Toppinen was arrested)	
Tuomi, Lempi	1882	F	Socialist Workers Party	Vaasa East	(Note: Lempi Tuomi was imprisoned, removed from office on October 17, 1923)	
Tulenheimo, Antti	1879	M	National Coalition Party	Häme South		
Tulenheimo, Eino	1885	M	National Coalition Party	Turku South		
Typpö, Taneli	1878	M	Social Democratic Party	Viipuri West		
Vainio, Jaakko	1892	M	Agrarian League	Viipuri West		
Vainio, Vihtori	1890	M	Socialist Workers Party	Uusimaa	(Note: Vihtori Vainio replaced Matti Väisänen on February 1, 1923, was later imprisoned and removed from office on October 17, 1923)	
Vainio, Ville	1882	M	Socialist Workers Party	Kuopio West	(Note: Ville Vainio was arrested, removed from office on October 17, 1923)	
Valjakka, Hilma	1881	F	Social Democratic Party	Mikkeli		
Valkama, Yrjö	1887	M	Socialist Workers Party	Oulu South	(Note: Yrjö Valkama was arrested, removed from office on October 17, 1923)	
Vanhala, Tuomas	1872	M	National Coalition Party	Viipuri West		
Vennola, Juho	1872	M	National Progressive Party	Uusimaa		
Vesterinen, Vihtori	1885	M	Agrarian League	Vaasa East		
Vesterlund, Juho	1888	M	Socialist Workers Party	Turku North	(Note: Juho Vesterlund was imprisoned, removed from office on October 17, 1923)	
Vihuri, Iida	1882	F	Social Democratic Party	Häme North		
Viljanen, Jalmari	1872	M	National Coalition Party	Häme South		
Virkkunen, Paavo	1874	M	National Coalition Party	Vaasa South		
Voionmaa, Väinö	1869	M	Social Democratic Party	Häme North		
Väisänen, Matti	1887	M	Socialist Workers Party	Uusimaa	(Note: Matti Väisänen was removed from office on December 20, 1922)	
Welling, Yrjö	1885	M	Social Democratic Party	Viipuri East		
Westermarck, Bjarne	1887	M	Agrarian League	Turku North	(Note: Resignation of Bjarne Westermarck was accepted on February 6, 1923)	
Wiik, K.H.	1883	M	Social Democratic Party	Uusimaa		
von Wright, Ferdinand	1863	M	Swedish People's Party	Uusimaa		
Wuolijoki, Wäinö	1872	M	Social Democratic Party	Turku South		
Åkerblom, Kristian	1877	M	Swedish People's Party	Vaasa South		
Åkesson, Otto	1872	M	Agrarian League	Viipuri East		
Österholm, John	1882	M	Swedish People's Party	Uusimaa		
