= List of members of the Parliament of Finland, 1924–1927 =

This is the list of the members of the Parliament of Finland between May 1, 1924 – September 1, 1927 following the parliamentary election held April 1–2, 1924. The elections were originally scheduled be held in August 1925; but after the Socialist Workers Party had been outlawed and its members arrested, the Parliament only had 173 members instead of 200. Disagreement between President Ståhlberg and Prime Minister Kallio on the question of early elections caused the latter to resign. The new caretaker cabinet led by Aimo Cajander then ordered disbandment of the Parliament and early elections.

The elections did not cause major changes to the Finnish political landscape. The communists—in the form of Socialist Workers' and Small Farmers' Election Alliance—lost 9 seats, majority of which were gained by Social Democratic Party of Finland. Together the parties on the left had only 78 seats, less than ever before. Social Democrats remained the largest group in Parliament with 60 seats, followed by Agrarian Party and National Coalition Party. Among the 200 members of the Parliament were 17 women (8.5%).

Kyösti Kallio acted as Speaker of the Parliament of Finland until he became Minister in March 1925. Wäinö Wuolijoki was then the Speaker 1925–26 and Paavo Virkkunen 1926–27.

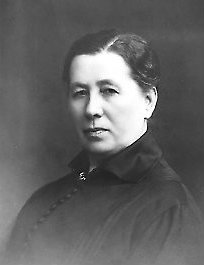
Miina Sillanpää become Finland's first female minister in 1926.

Only the first of the four cabinets formed during this parliament had a majority, and it too lost its majority when the Agrarian Party withdraw from cabinet following a disagreement on pensions of government officials. The Ingman cabinet finally resigned four months after that due to defeat of the election bill.

As neither National Progressive Party nor Swedish People's Party were willing to enter the new cabinet due to their disappointment with the election bill, Antti Tulenheimo formed a minority cabinet between National Coalition and Agrarian Parties. After this cabinet had resigned due to question of national defense funding, Kyösti Kallio headed another cabinet formed on the same basis.

The fourth and last cabinet formed during this Parliament and led by Väinö Tanner is important in the Finnish political history for several reasons. It was the first time the largest party in Finland, the Social Democrats, had participated in a cabinet during the time Finland had been independent, and also only the second time in the history of the Parliament of Finland after the Tokoi senate in 1917. It also had Finland's first female minister, Miina Sillanpää.

Cabinets formed during the parliament
Cabinet	Start	End	Days	Parties
Lauri Ingman's second cabinet	May 13, 1924	March 31, 1925	305	National Coalition Party; National Progressive Party; Agrarian Party (Note: Agrarian Party withdrew its ministers from the cabinet of Ingman on November 22, 1924); Swedish People's Party
Antti Tulenheimo's cabinet	March 31, 1925	December 31, 1925	276	National Coalition Party; Agrarian Party
Kyösti Kallio's second cabinet	December 31, 1925	December 13, 1926	348	National Coalition Party; Agrarian Party
Väinö Tanner's cabinet	December 13, 1926	December 17, 1927	370	Social Democratic Party

== Members of the Parliament 1924–1927 ==
In the table, the names written with italics were appointed to the Parliament later than May 1, 1924—the first day of the new Parliament—to replace those who had died or resigned. The names are given here as in the membership roll of the Parliament; for example the name Svento is used instead of Sventorzetski even though the latter version was used until 1938.

English name	Finnish & Swedish name	Seats
Social Democratic Party of Finland	Suomen Sosialidemokraattinen Puolue, Finlands socialdemokratiska parti	60 (Note: Edvard Huttunen joined the parliamentary group of Social Democratic Party on February 5, 1926)
Agrarian Party	Maalaisliitto, Agrarförbundet	44
National Coalition Party	Kansallinen Kokoomus, Samlingspartiet	38
Socialist Workers' and Small Farmers' Election Alliance	Sosialistinen työväen ja pienviljelijäin vaaliliitto, Finlands socialistiska arbetarparti	18
Swedish People's Party	Ruotsalainen kansanpuolue, Svenska folkpartiet	23 (Note: Georg Schauman was nominated by Swedish People's Party, but did not join party's parliamentary group after the election and instead formed Swedish Left parliamentary group (Swedish: Svensk Vänster, Finnish: Ruotsalainen vasemmisto).)
National Progressive Party	Kansallinen Edistyspuolue. Framstegspartiet	17

Name	Born	Sex	Parliamentary group	Constituency	Notes	Source
Aalto, Artturi	1876	M	Social Democratic Party	Uusimaa		
Aalto, Johan	1886	M	Social Democratic Party	Viipuri West		
Ahlfors, Fanny	1884	F	Social Democratic Party	Turku North		
Ailio, Julius	1872	M	Social Democratic Party	Häme South		
Ainali, Sakari	1874	M	National Coalition Party	Oulu South		
Alestalo, Anshelm	1880	M	Agrarian Party	Turku North		
Allila, Aleksander	1890	M	Workers' and Small Farmers' Election Alliance	Uusimaa		
Ampuja, Mikko	1882	M	Social Democratic Party	Uusimaa		
Anderson, Amos	1878	M	Swedish People's Party	Turku South		
Annala, Valentin	1859	M	Social Democratic Party	Turku South	(Note: Valentin Annala died on October 19, 1926)	
Arhama, Kusti	1885	M	Agrarian Party	Oulu South		
Aromaa, Emanuel	1873	M	Social Democratic Party	Turku North		
Asikainen, Aatami	1891	M	Workers' and Small Farmers' Election Alliance	Kuopio West		
Auer, Ilmari	1879	M	National Progressive Party	Uusimaa		
Bergroth, Waldemar	1852	M	National Coalition Party	Turku South		
Björk, Matts	1867	M	Swedish People's Party	Vaasa North		
von Born, Ernst	1885	M	Swedish People's Party	Uusimaa		
Brander, Uuno	1870	M	National Progressive Party	Oulu South		
Bryggari, Tuomas	1881	M	Social Democratic Party	Vaasa East		
Eerola, Albert	1874	M	National Coalition Party	Häme South		
Elfving, Otto	1874	M	Social Democratic Party	Vaasa North	(Note: Otto Elfving replaced Pekka Meriläinen on October 20, 1926)	
Estlander, Ernst	1870	M	Swedish People's Party	Vaasa South		
Forsberg, Anders	1864	M	Swedish People's Party	Turku South		
Furuhjelm, Ragnar	1879	M	Swedish People's Party	Uusimaa		
Gebhard, Hedvig	1867	F	National Coalition Party	Uusimaa		
Hakala, Kalle	1880	M	Social Democratic Party	Mikkeli		
Hakkila, Väinö	1882	M	Social Democratic Party	Häme North		
Halonen, Toivo	1893	M	Social Democratic Party	Mikkeli		
Hannula, Mandi	1880	F	National Progressive Party	Mikkeli		
Harvala, Kaarlo	1885	M	Social Democratic Party	Häme North		
Hatva, Eero	1872	M	Agrarian Party	Kuopio West		
Haverinen, Anna	1884	F	Social Democratic Party	Viipuri West		
Heikinheimo, Eva	1887	F	National Progressive Party	Vaasa East	(Note: Eva Heikinheimo replaced Aaro Jaskari on September 1, 1925)	
Heikinheimo, Oskari	1873	M	National Coalition Party	Vaasa East		
Heikkilä, Bernhard	1882	M	National Coalition Party	Turku South		
Heikkinen, Pekka	1883	M	Agrarian Party	Kuopio West		
Heikura, Eino	1893	M	Agrarian Party	Turku North		
Helo, Johan	1889	M	Social Democratic Party	Turku South		
Hiidenheimo, Artturi	1877	M	National Coalition Party	Uusimaa		
Hiidenheimo, Elli	1883	F	National Coalition Party	Häme North		
Hirvensalo, Vilho	1881	M	National Progressive Party	Kuopio West		
Hornborg, Eirik	1879	M	Swedish People's Party	Uusimaa		
Huotari, Anni	1874	F	Social Democratic Party	Uusimaa		
Hurme, Kaarlo	1883	M	Agrarian Party	Vaasa East		
Huttunen, Edvard	1889	M	Workers' and Small Farmers' Election Alliance; Social Democratic Party	Viipuri West		
Hänninen, Kaarlo	1876	M	Agrarian Party	Oulu North		
Härmä, Frans	1881	M	National Coalition Party	Turku North		
Hästbacka, Emil	1872	M	Swedish People's Party	Vaasa North		
Ihamuotila, Janne	1868	M	Agrarian Party	Häme North		
Inborr, Johannes	1867	M	Swedish People's Party	Vaasa North		
Ingman, Lauri	1868	M	National Coalition Party	Turku North		
Isaksson, August	1886	M	Workers' and Small Farmers' Election Alliance	Vaasa South		
Itkonen, Rieti	1889	M	Social Democratic Party	Kuopio East		
Jacobsson, Otto	1886	M	Swedish People's Party	Vaasa South		
Janhonen, Toivo	1886	M	Agrarian Party	Oulu South		
Jaskari, Aaro	1880	M	National Progressive Party	Vaasa East	(Note: Aaro Jaskari died on August 28, 1925)	
Jaskari, Mikko	1866	M	National Coalition Party	Vaasa North		
Jern, Levi	1893	M	Swedish People's Party	Vaasa South		
Jokela, Edvard	1889	M	Workers' and Small Farmers' Election Alliance	Uusimaa		
Junes, Antti	1874	M	Agrarian Party	Oulu North		
Junnila, Taave	1869	M	National Coalition Party	Turku North		
Jussila, Oskari	1888	M	National Coalition Party	Oulu North		
Juutilainen, Antti	1882	M	Agrarian Party	Viipuri East		
Jyske, Jalmari	1884	M	National Progressive Party	Kuopio East		
Järvinen, Kyösti	1869	M	National Coalition Party	Uusimaa		
Kaila, Erkki	1867	M	National Coalition Party	Uusimaa		
Kallio, Kyösti	1873	M	Agrarian Party	Oulu South		
Kalliokoski, Viljami	1894	M	Agrarian Party	Vaasa North		
Kares, Kaarlo	1873	M	National Coalition Party	Häme South		
Kauranen, Jooseppi	1880	M	Agrarian Party	Viipuri East		
Keto, Jaakko	1884	M	Social Democratic Party	Häme South		
Kilpeläinen, Edvard	1879	M	National Coalition Party	Viipuri West		
Kinnunen, Juho	1865	M	National Coalition Party	Mikkeli		
Kirra, Kalle	1893	M	Agrarian Party	Turku North		
Kivimäki, Toivo	1886	M	National Progressive Party	Turku South		
Klockars, Johannes	1867	M	Swedish People's Party	Vaasa South		
Koivulahti-Lehto, Hilma	1881	F	Social Democratic Party	Vaasa East		
Koivuranta, Janne	1885	M	Agrarian Party	Oulu North		
Komu, Yrjö	1890	M	Social Democratic Party	Mikkeli		
Komulainen, Juho	1875	M	Workers' and Small Farmers' Election Alliance	Kuopio West	(Note: Juho Komulainen died on April 10, 1927)	
Kontio, Oskari	1884	M	Agrarian Party	Mikkeli		
Kontula, Manu	1873	M	Social Democratic Party	Uusimaa		
Koponen, Albin	1881	M	Social Democratic Party	Kuopio East		
Kopsa, Pekka	1887	M	Agrarian Party	Viipuri East		
Kovanen, Jalmari	1877	M	Social Democratic Party	Vaasa East		
Kuisma, Antti	1892	M	Agrarian Party	Viipuri East		
Kukkonen, Antti	1889	M	Agrarian Party	Viipuri East		
Kulenius, Evert	1879	M	Swedish People's Party	Vaasa North		
Kulmala, Kalle	1891	M	Workers' and Small Farmers' Election Alliance	Turku South		
Kylänpää, Kustaa	1881	M	National Coalition Party	Turku North	(Note: Kustaa Kylänpää replaced Anshelm Sjöstedt-Jussila on October 20, 1925)	
Kärki, Frans	1884	M	Agrarian Party	Vaasa South		
Lahdensuo, Jalo	1882	M	Agrarian Party	Vaasa North		
Laurén, Karl	1879	M	Swedish People's Party	Turku South		
Lautala, Emil	1882	M	Agrarian Party	Viipuri West		
Lehto, Toivo	1891	M	Social Democratic Party	Vaasa East		
Lehtokoski, Aino	1886	F	Social Democratic Party	Turku South		
Leino, Jussi	1894	M	Social Democratic Party	Turku South		
Leinonen, Olga	1877	F	Social Democratic Party	Häme South		
Liedes, Jaakko	1886	M	Workers' and Small Farmers' Election Alliance	Oulu North	(Note: Jaakko Liedes replaced Konsta Vuokila on October 17, 1924)	
Lindberg, Gustaf	1882	M	Swedish People's Party	Uusimaa		
Linna, Eemil	1876	M	National Progressive Party	Häme North		
Lohi, Kalle	1872	M	Agrarian Party	Oulu North		
Lonkainen, Jussi	1890	M	Social Democratic Party	Viipuri East		
Louhelainen, Arvi	1896	M	Social Democratic Party	Kuopio East		
Luostarinen, Alpo	1886	M	National Progressive Party	Mikkeli		
Makkonen, Matti	1879	M	Agrarian Party	Kuopio West		
Malkamäki, Aino	1895	F	Social Democratic Party	Mikkeli		
Mangs, Josef	1883	M	Swedish People's Party	Vaasa South		
Manner, Albin	1888	M	Agrarian Party	Viipuri East		
Mannermaa, Juho	1871	M	National Coalition Party	Oulu South		
Mantere, Oskari	1874	M	National Progressive Party	Häme South		
Meriläinen, Pekka	1886	M	Social Democratic Party	Vaasa North	(Note: Pekka Meriläinen died on April 9, 1926)	
Molin, Knut	1876	M	Swedish People's Party	Turku South		
Muhonen, Atte	1888	M	Social Democratic Party	Vaasa East		
Mustasilta, Frans	1879	M	Social Democratic Party	Turku North		
Myllymäki, Kalle	1883	M	Social Democratic Party	Häme South		
Neitiniemi, Aukusti	1875	M	National Coalition Party	Lapinmaa		
Nikkanen, Ville	1885	M	National Coalition Party	Viipuri West		
Niukkanen, Juho	1888	M	Agrarian Party	Viipuri East		
Nukari, Evert	1874	M	National Coalition Party	Häme South		
Nurminen, Uno	1895	M	Workers' and Small Farmers' Election Alliance	Uusimaa		
Paasivuori, Matti	1866	M	Social Democratic Party	Viipuri West		
Paasonen, Armas	1885	M	Social Democratic Party	Kuopio West		
Paavolainen, Erkki	1890	M	National Coalition Party	Viipuri East		
Palmgren, Axel	1867	M	Swedish People's Party	Uusimaa		
Peltonen, Johannes	1868	M	National Coalition Party	Häme North		
Pelttari, Niilo	1886	M	Agrarian Party	Oulu South		
Pennanen, Pekka	1872	M	National Coalition Party	Kuopio East		
Pensas, Otto	1885	M	Social Democratic Party	Kuopio East		
Penttala, Isak	1883	M	Social Democratic Party	Vaasa South	(Note: Isak Penttala replaced Kaarlo Saari on March 4, 1927)	
Piippo, Vilho	1888	M	Social Democratic Party	Oulu South		
Piitulainen, Mikko	1878	M	Agrarian Party	Viipuri East		
Pitkänen, Matti	1885	M	Agrarian Party	Viipuri East		
Pitkänen, Taavi	1892	M	Workers' and Small Farmers' Election Alliance	Kuopio West	(Note: Taavi Pitkänen replaced Juho Komulainen on April 25, 1927)	
Pohjala, Lauri	1870	M	National Coalition Party	Viipuri West		
Pojanluoma, Hermanni	1869	M	National Coalition Party	Vaasa		
Procopé, Hjalmar	1889	M	Swedish People's Party	Uusimaa	(Note: Hjalmar Procopé's resignation was accepted on March 9, 1926)	
Puittinen, Matti	1883	M	Social Democratic Party	Kuopio East		
Pulkkinen, Yrjö	1875	M	National Coalition Party	Häme North		
Pullinen, Erkki	1871	M	National Progressive Party	Viipuri East		
Raatikainen, August	1874	M	Agrarian Party	Kuopio West		
Ramstedt, Emanuel	1881	M	Workers' and Small Farmers' Election Alliance	Turku South		
Rannikko, Juho	1873	M	National Coalition Party	Turku South		
Rantala, Viljo	1892	M	Social Democratic Party	Turku North		
Rapo, Jussi	1878	M	Social Democratic Party	Viipuri East		
Reinikainen, Oskari	1885	M	Social Democratic Party	Viipuri West		
Reinikka, Tyko	1887	M	Agrarian Party	Kuopio East		
Rosenberg, Mauritz	1879	M	Workers' and Small Farmers' Election Alliance	Oulu South		
Ruotzi, Siviä	1880	F	National Coalition Party	Viipuri West		
Ryynänen, Juho	1873	M	Agrarian Party	Kuopio East		
Ryömä, Hannes	1878	M	Social Democratic Party	Uusimaa		
Räsänen, Janne	1879	M	Workers' and Small Farmers' Election Alliance	Oulu South		
Saarelainen, Pekka	1868	M	Agrarian Party	Kuopio East		
Saari, Kaarlo	1855	M	Social Democratic Party	Vaasa South	(Note: Kaarlo Saari died on February 25, 1927)	
Saarinen, Emil	1879	M	Social Democratic Party	Häme North		
Saarinen, Paavo	1886	M	Agrarian Party	Turku South		
Saastamoinen, Armas	1886	M	National Coalition Party	Kuopio West	(Note: Armas Saastamoinen on resigned February 5, 1926)	
Salo, Sulo	1887	M	Agrarian Party	Oulu South		
Savenius, Filemon	1883	M	Workers' and Small Farmers' Election Alliance	Oulu South		
Savolainen-Tapaninen, Anni	1875	F	Social Democratic Party	Mikkeli		
Schauman, Georg	1870	M	Swedish Left	Uusimaa		
Seppälä, Hilda	1879	M	Social Democratic Party	Uusimaa		
Seppänen, Jaakko	1881	M	Agrarian Party	Oulu South		
Sergelius, Max	1879	M	Swedish Left	Uusimaa	(Note: Max Sergelius replaced Hjalmar Procopé on March 12, 1926 and joined the Swedish Left parliamentary group)	
Setälä, E. N.	1864	M	National Coalition Party	Viipuri East		
Setälä, Edvard	1874	M	Social Democratic Party	Vaasa East		
Sillanpää, Miina	1866	F	Social Democratic Party	Turku North		
Sirola, Leander	1871	M	Social Democratic Party	Uusimaa		
Sjöstedt-Jussila, Anshelm	1869	M	National Coalition Party	Turku North	(Note: Anshelm Sjöstedt-Jussila resigned on September 5, 1925)	
Soikkeli, Antti	1883	M	Workers' and Small Farmers' Election Alliance	Kuopio West		
Somersalo, Eva	1883	F	National Coalition Party	Mikkeli		
Strengell, Pekka	1882	M	Workers' and Small Farmers' Election Alliance	Kuopio West	(Note: Pekka Strengell replaced Bruno Tenhunen on October 10, 1924)	
Sunila, Juho	1875	M	Agrarian Party	Häme South		
Svento, Reinhold	1881	M	Social Democratic Party	Mikkeli		
Särkkä, Wille	1877	M	National Progressive Party	Viipuri West		
Tabell, Emil	1899	M	Workers' and Small Farmers' Election Alliance	Oulu North		
Tainio, Taavi	1874	M	Social Democratic Party	Kuopio West		
Tanner, Väinö	1881	M	Social Democratic Party	Turku North		
Tarkkanen, Mikko	1886	M	Agrarian Party	Vaasa South		
Tenhunen, Bruno	1898	M	Workers' and Small Farmers' Election Alliance	Kuopio West	(Note: Bruno Tenhunen was judged to be ineligible for parliament membership on October 1, 1924)	
Toivonen, Otto	1884	M	Social Democratic Party	Häme South		
Tukia, Elias	1877	M	Agrarian Party	Viipuri West		
Tulenheimo, Eino	1885	M	National Coalition Party	Turku South		
Tuomioja, Walto	1888	M	National Progressive Party	Turku North		
Tuomivaara, Eino	1887	M	Agrarian Party	Viipuri West		
Turja, Ernsti	1882	M	National Coalition Party	Vaasa North		
Typpö, Taneli	1878	M	Social Democratic Party	Viipuri West		
Valjakka, Hilma	1881	F	Social Democratic Party	Mikkeli		
Valkama, Hannes	1876	M	National Progressive Party	Viipuri West		
Vanhala, Tuomas	1872	M	National Coalition Party	Viipuri West		
Varho, Kaarlo	1877	M	Workers' and Small Farmers' Election Alliance	Turku North	(Note: Kaarlo Varho replaced Svantte Vuorio on February 1, 1926)	
Vehkaoja, Heikki	1889	M	Agrarian Party	Vaasa North		
Vennola, Juho	1872	M	National Progressive Party	Uusimaa		
Vertanen, Anttoni	1884	M	Agrarian Party	Viipuri East		
Vesterinen, Vihtori	1885	M	Agrarian Party	Vaasa East		
Vihuri, Iida	1882	F	Social Democratic Party	Häme North		
Viljanen, V.M.J.	1874	M	National Progressive Party	Viipuri West		
Virkkunen, Paavo	1874	M	National Coalition Party	Vaasa South		
Virta, Jalmari	1884	M	Workers' and Small Farmers' Election Alliance	Häme South		
Voionmaa, Väinö	1869	M	Social Democratic Party	Häme North		
Vuokila, Konsta	1877	M	Workers' and Small Farmers' Election Alliance	Oulu North	(Note: Konsta Vuokila was judged to be ineligible for parliament membership on October 1, 1924)	
Vuokoski, Kaarlo	1880	M	National Progressive Party	Mikkeli		
Vuorio, Svantte	1890	M	Workers' and Small Farmers' Election Alliance	Turku North	(Note: Svantte Vuorio resigned on December 2, 1925 due illness)	
Wahlstén, Edvin	1872	M	Social Democratic Party	Turku South	(Note: Edvin Wahlstén replaced Valentin Annala on October 20, 1926)	
Welling, Yrjö	1885	M	Social Democratic Party	Viipuri East		
Wiik, K.H.	1883	M	Social Democratic Party	Uusimaa		
Witting, Rolf	1879	M	Swedish People's Party	Uusimaa		
Wuolijoki, Wäinö	1872	M	Social Democratic Party	Turku South		
Zitting, Olli	1872	M	National Coalition Party	Kuopio West	(Note: Olli Zitting replaced Armas Saastamoinen on February 12, 1926)	
Åkerblom, Kristian	1877	M	Swedish People's Party	Vaasa South		
Österholm, John	1882	M	Swedish People's Party	Uusimaa		
