= Eronen =

Eronen is a Finnish surname. Notable people with the surname include:

- Oliver Eronen (1865–1939), Finnish farmer and politician
- Aukusti Eronen (1875–1935), Finnish farmer and politician
- Ella Eronen (1900–1987), Finnish actress
- Tommi Eronen (born 1968), Finnish actor
- Kimmo Eronen (born 1971), Finnish ice hockey player
- Teemu Eronen (born 1990), Finnish ice hockey player
- Elmeri Eronen (born 1995), Finnish ice hockey player
- Ada Eronen (born 2004), Finnish ice hockey player
