= Kemppi (surname) =

Kemppi is a Finnish surname. Notable people with the surname include:

- Antti Kemppi (1893–1974), Finnish farmer and politician
- Hilkka Kemppi, Finnish politician
- Juliette Kemppi (born 1994), Finnish women's footballer
- Pekka Kemppi (1887–1957), Finnish politician
- Usko Kemppi (1907–1994), Finnish composer, lyricist, author and screenwriter
