= Haverinen =

Haverinen is a Finnish surname. Notable people with the surname include:

- Anna Haverinen (1884–1959), Finnish office worker and politician
- Joni Haverinen (born 1987), Finnish ice hockey player
- Teuvo Haverinen, Finnish professional darts player
