= Vainio =

Vainio is a Finnish surname meaning "field". Notable people with the surname include:

- Aaro Vainio (born 1993), Finnish race driver
- Alisa Vainio (born 1997), Finnish long-distance runner
- Edvard August Vainio (1853–1929), Finnish lichenologist
- Jaakko Vainio (1892–1953), Finnish journalist and politician
- Jouni Vainio (born 1960), Finnish Olympian sport shooter
- Juha Vainio (1938–1990), Finnish musician
- Martti Vainio (born 1950), Finnish long-distance runner
- Mikko Vainio (1923–2017), Finnish politician
- Vihtori Vainio (1890–1942), Finnish politician
