= Viljanen =

Viljanen is a Finnish surname. Notable people with the surname include:

- Eerikki Viljanen (born 1975), Finnish politician
- Elias Viljanen (born 1975), Finnish musician
- Emil Viljanen (1874–1954), Finnish civil servant and politician
- Heidi Viljanen (born 1980), Finnish politician
- Ilkka Viljanen (born 1960), Finnish politician
- Jalmari Viljanen (1872–1928), Finnish farmer and politician
- Kim Viljanen (born 1981), Finnish darts player
- Lauri Viljanen (1900–1994), Finnish literary critic and writer
- Matti Viljanen (1937–2015), Finnish engineer and politician
- Pekka Viljanen (athlete) (1921–1995), Finnish racewalker
- Pekka Viljanen (politician) (born 1945), Finnish farmer and politician
- Petri Viljanen (born 1987), Finnish footballer
- Valtteri Viljanen (born 1994), Finnish ice hockey player
- Ville Viljanen (born 1971), Finnish footballer
- V.M.J. Viljanen (1874–1946), Finnish engineer, business executive and politician
