= Koponen =

Koponen is an old Finnish Savonian surname. The name is usually considered to derive from the Orthodox saint's name Prokopios. This surname and the family bearing it may have originated as early as the 13th–14th centuries. Over the centuries, the name has appeared in several different spellings, such as: "Copoin, Copoinen" or in the feminine form "Copotar and Kopotar". The family's ancestral home is the ancient Leppävirta parish and especially the village of Varistaipale (in the present day Heinävesi). The family divided into several branches already during the 16th century.

- Kuikka-Koponen (1833–1890), Finnish illusionist and magician
- Albin Koponen (1881–1944), Finnish sheet metal worker and politician
- Aulis Koponen (1906–1978), Finnish international footballer
- Niilo Koponen (1928–2013), American education and politician
- Timo Koponen (born 1942), Finnish diplomat
- Hannu Koponen (born 1959), Finnish ski-orienteering competitor
- Ari Koponen (politician) (born 1982), Finnish politician
- Ari Koponen (speedway rider) (1959–2018), Finnish speedway rider
- Noora Koponen (born 1983), Finnish politician
- Ville-Matti Koponen (born 1984), Finnish professional ice hockey forward
- Marlo Koponen (born 1986), Finnish ice hockey defenceman
- Petteri Koponen (born 1988), Finnish professional basketball player
- Suvi Koponen (born 1988), Finnish fashion model
- Jere Koponen (born 1992), Finnish football goalkeeper
