= Jaskari =

Surname list

Jaskari is a surname. Notable people with the surname include:

- Aaro Jaskari (1880–1925), Finnish politician
- Aatos Jaskari (1904–1962), Finnish wrestler
- Mikko Jaskari (1866–1936), Finnish politician
- Tauno Jaskari (born 1934), Finnish wrestler
