= 1924 Finnish parliamentary election =

General election

← 1922	1–2 April 1924	1927 →

All 200 seats in the Parliament of Finland 101 seats needed for a majority
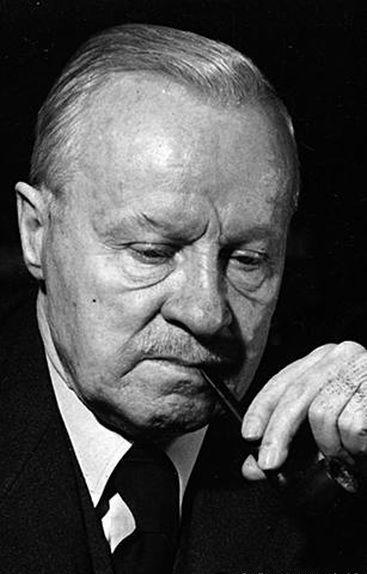

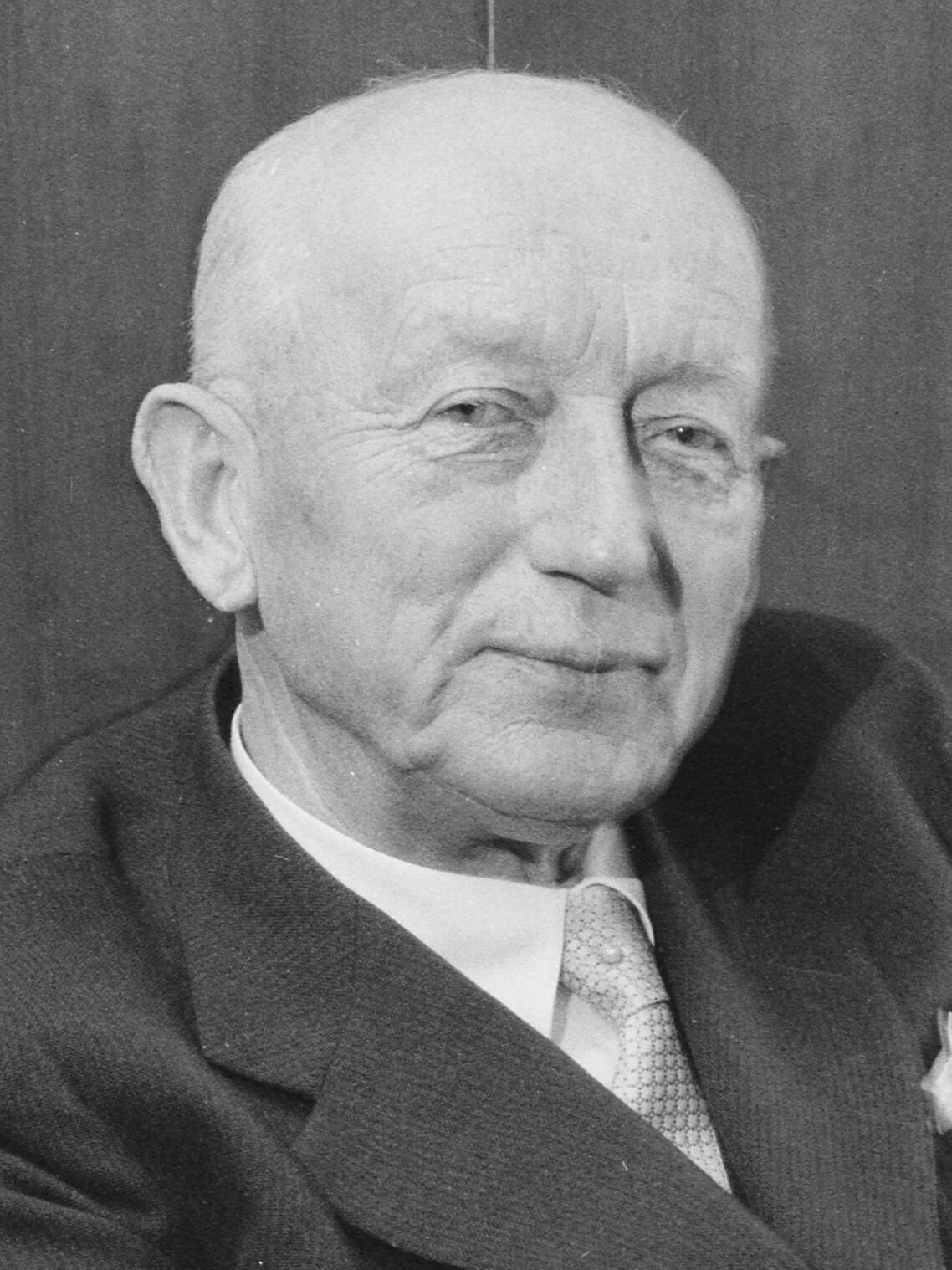

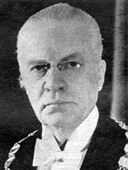

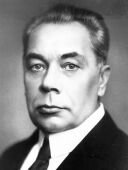
	First party	Second party	Third party
Leader	Väinö Tanner	Pekka Heikkinen	Antti Tulenheimo
Party	SDP	Agrarian	National Coalition
Last election	25.06%, 53 seats	20.27%, 45 seats	18.15%, 35 seats
Seats won	60	44	38
Seat change	▲7	▼1	▲3
Popular vote	255,068	177,982	166,880
Percentage	29.02%	20.25%	18.99%
Swing	▲3.96pp	▼0.02pp	▲0.84pp
	Fourth party	Fifth party	Sixth party
Leader	Eric von Rettig		Oskari Mantere
Party	RKP	STPV	National Progressive
Last election	12.41%, 25 seats	–	9.21%, 15 seats
Seats won	23	18	17
Seat change	▼2	New	▲2
Popular vote	105,733	91,839	79,937
Percentage	12.03%	10.45%	9.09%
Swing	▼0.38pp	New	▼0.12pp
Prime Minister before election
Aimo Cajander
Independent
Prime Minister after election
Lauri Ingman
National Coalition

Parliamentary elections were held in Finland on 1 and 2 April 1924. Although the Social Democratic Party remained the largest in Parliament with 60 of the 200 seats, Lauri Ingman of the National Coalition Party formed a centre-right majority government in May 1924. It remained intact until the Agrarians left in November 1924. Voter turnout was 57.4%.

== Background ==
President Kaarlo Juho Ståhlberg decided to dissolve Parliament in January 1924 and to organise early elections for April 1924, as since August 1923, Parliament had been 27 members short following the arrest of the Communist MPs suspected of treason. Around December 1923 and January 1924, the Social Democrats threatened to withdraw from Parliament, unless early elections were held. Prime Minister Kyösti Kallio opposed the dissolution of Parliament, true to his parliamentary principles, and resigned after Ståhlberg indicated that he would dissolve Parliament. After Kallio's resignation, Ståhlberg appointed a caretaker government of civil servants, led by Professor Aimo Cajander (a Progressive). The 1922 land reform had been enacted, on the initiative of Prime Minister Kallio. The National Coalitioners were becoming more right-wing and less reformist. The Progressives were losing votes to the National Coalitioners and Agrarians, with their brand of petty-bourgeois, urban liberalism losing its appeal in the still heavily agrarian Finland.

== Results ==
Party	Votes	%	Seats	+/–
Social Democratic Party	255,068	29.02	60	+7
Agrarian League	177,982	20.25	44	–1
National Coalition Party	166,880	18.99	38	+3
Swedish People's Party	105,733	12.03	23	–2
Electoral Organisation of Socialist Workers and Smallholders	91,839	10.45	18	–9
National Progressive Party	79,937	9.09	17	+2
Peasants' List	456	0.05	0	New
Others	1,046	0.12	0	–
Total	878,941	100.00	200	0
Valid votes	878,941	99.45		
Invalid/blank votes	4,884	0.55		
Total votes	883,825	100.00		
Registered voters/turnout	1,539,393	57.41		
Source: Nohlen & Stöver

== See also ==
- List of members of the Parliament of Finland, 1924–1927
