= Mäkelin =

Mäkelin is a Finnish surname. Notable people with the surname include:

- Antti Mäkelin (1871–1948), Finnish politician
- Ellen Mäkelin (1871–1935), Finnish labor activist
- Emmi Mäkelin (1871–1962), Finnish midwife and politician
- Impi Mäkelin (1880–1945), Finnish writer
- Yrjö Mäkelin (1875–1923), Finnish journalist and politician
