= Pekka Viljanen =

Pekka Viljanen may refer to:

- Pekka Viljanen (athlete) (1921–1995), Finnish racewalker
- Pekka Viljanen (politician) (born 1945), Finnish farmer and politician
