= Kauranen =

Kauranen is a Finnish surname. Notable people with the surname include:

- Jooseppi Kauranen (1880–1935), Finnish farmer and politician
- Pentti Kauranen, Finnish professor of chemistry
- August Kuusisto (1883–1972), surname until 1920 Kauranen, Finnish farmer and politician
- Anja Snellman (born 1954), née Kauranen, Finnish author
