= Jarmo Kuusisto =

Finnish ice hockey defenceman

- Born: April 5, 1961 (age 64) Uusikaupunki, Finland
- Height: 5 ft 9 in (175 cm)
- Weight: 174 lb (79 kg; 12 st 6 lb)
- Position: Defence
- Shot: Right
- Played for: Lukko; Brest Albatros Hockey; Ässät; AIK IF; Herning Blue Fox; Drakkars de Caen
- National team: Finland
- Playing career: 1979–2004

Jarmo Kuusisto (born April 5, 1961) is a Finnish former professional ice hockey defenceman.

Kuusisto played a total of 714 games in the SM-Liiga, 696 games for Lukko and 18 for Ässät. In the 1990–91 SM-liiga season, he won the Juha Rantasila Trophy for scoring the most goals by a defenceman with 16.

He also played in France's Élite Ligue for Brest Albatros Hockey and Drakkars de Caen, Sweden's Elitserien for AIK IF and Denmark's Codan Ligan for the Herning Blue Fox.

Kuusisto played for the Finland national team in the 1987, 1989 and 1990 Ice Hockey World Championships.

Preceded by Jorma Vehmanen	Captain of Lukko; 1982–83	Succeeded by Matti Forss
Preceded by Matti Forss	Captain of Lukko; 1987–90	Succeeded by Esa Keskinen
Preceded by Juha Tuohimaa	Juha Rantasila Trophy; 1991	Succeeded by Juha Tuohimaa
Preceded by Esa Keskinen	Captain of Lukko; 1991–92	Succeeded by Timo Saarikoski
Preceded by Pasi Huura	Captain of Lukko; 1994–95	Succeeded by Toni Porkka
Preceded by Kalle Sahlstedt	Captain of Lukko; 1997–98	Succeeded by Erik Hämäläinen
