= Langstrom =

Langstrom or Långström is a surname. Notable people with the surname include:

== People ==
- Toivo Hjalmar Långström (1889–1983), Finnish politician

== Fictional characters ==
- Dr. Francine Langstrom, DC Comics
- Dr. Robert Kirkland "Kirk" Langstrom, DC Comics supervillain
