= Port of Uusikaupunki =

Cargo port in Uusikaupunki, Finland

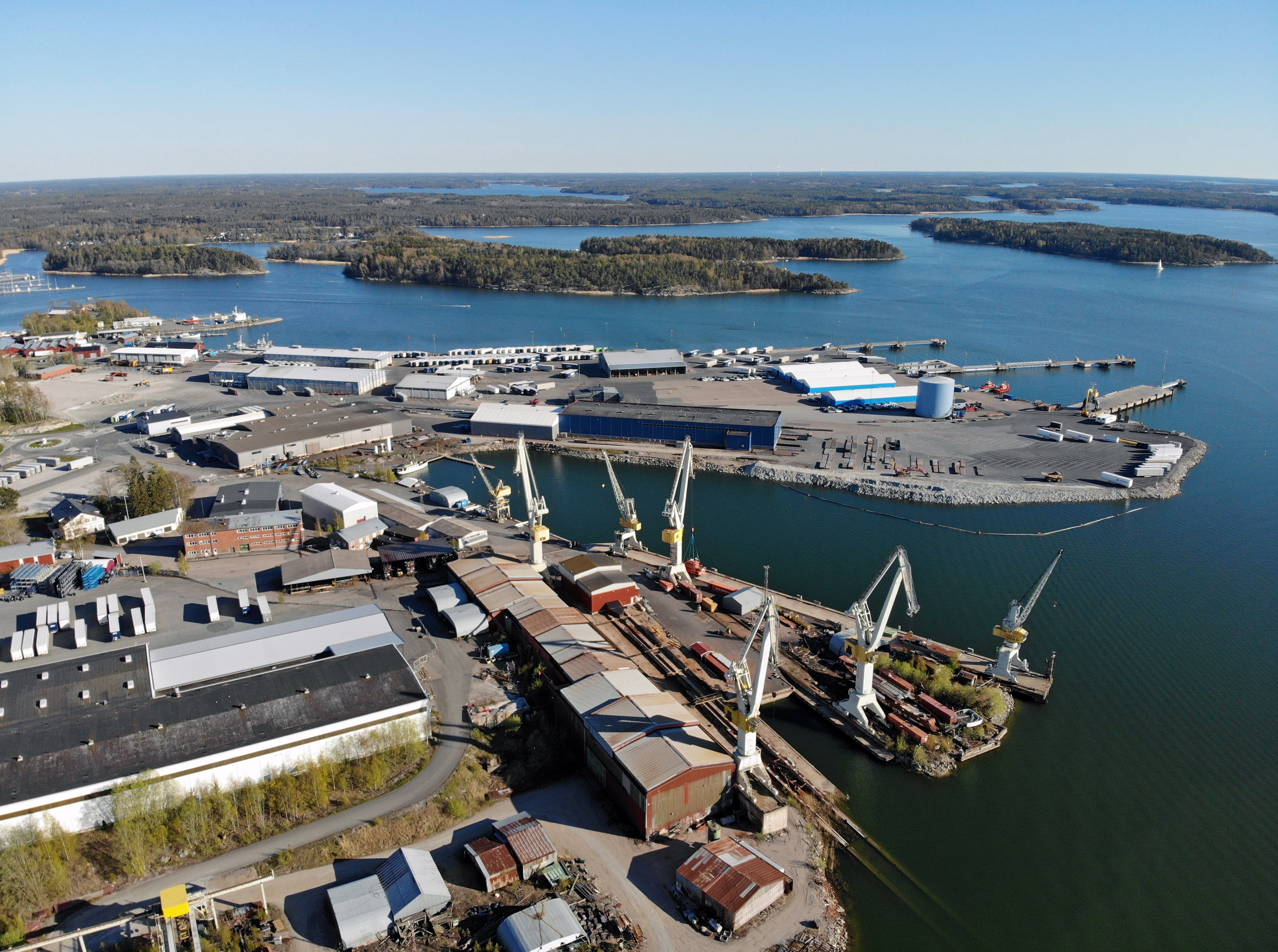
- Port of Uusikaupunki in 2020
- Click on the map for a fullscreen view
- Port of Uusikaupunki (Finland)
- Native name: Uudenkaupungin satama / Nystad hamn

Location
- Country: Finland
- Location: Uusikaupunki
- Coordinates: 60.794444°N 21.376389°E
- UN/LOCODE: FI UKI

Details
- Type of harbour: coastal natural
- No. of berths: 5
- Draft depth: max. 12.5 metres (41 ft) depth

Statistics
- Annual cargo tonnage: c. 2.5m tons (int'l) (2018)
- Website www.ukiport.fi

The Port of Uusikaupunki (also known as Port of Hepokari) is a mixed-use cargo port located in the city of Uusikaupunki, in southwestern Finland, on the eastern shore of the Bothnian Sea.

The port services mostly RoRo traffic, but is also equipped to handle conventional and liquid cargo.

In 2018, the total international cargo throughput of the port was c. 2.5m tons. Approximately 60% of this was exports, making Uusikaupunki the 10th largest export port in Finland. It is the main Finnish export port for cars, thanks to the Valmet Automotive plant located in Uusikaupunki.

The shipping lane into the harbour had previously maximum depth of 10 metres (33 ft), but in 2015 this was deepened to 12.5 metres (41 ft).
