= Uusikaupunki =

Town in Southwest Finland, Finland

Uusikaupunki Nystad (New Town) Vasaborg
- Town
- Uudenkaupungin kaupunki Nystads stad
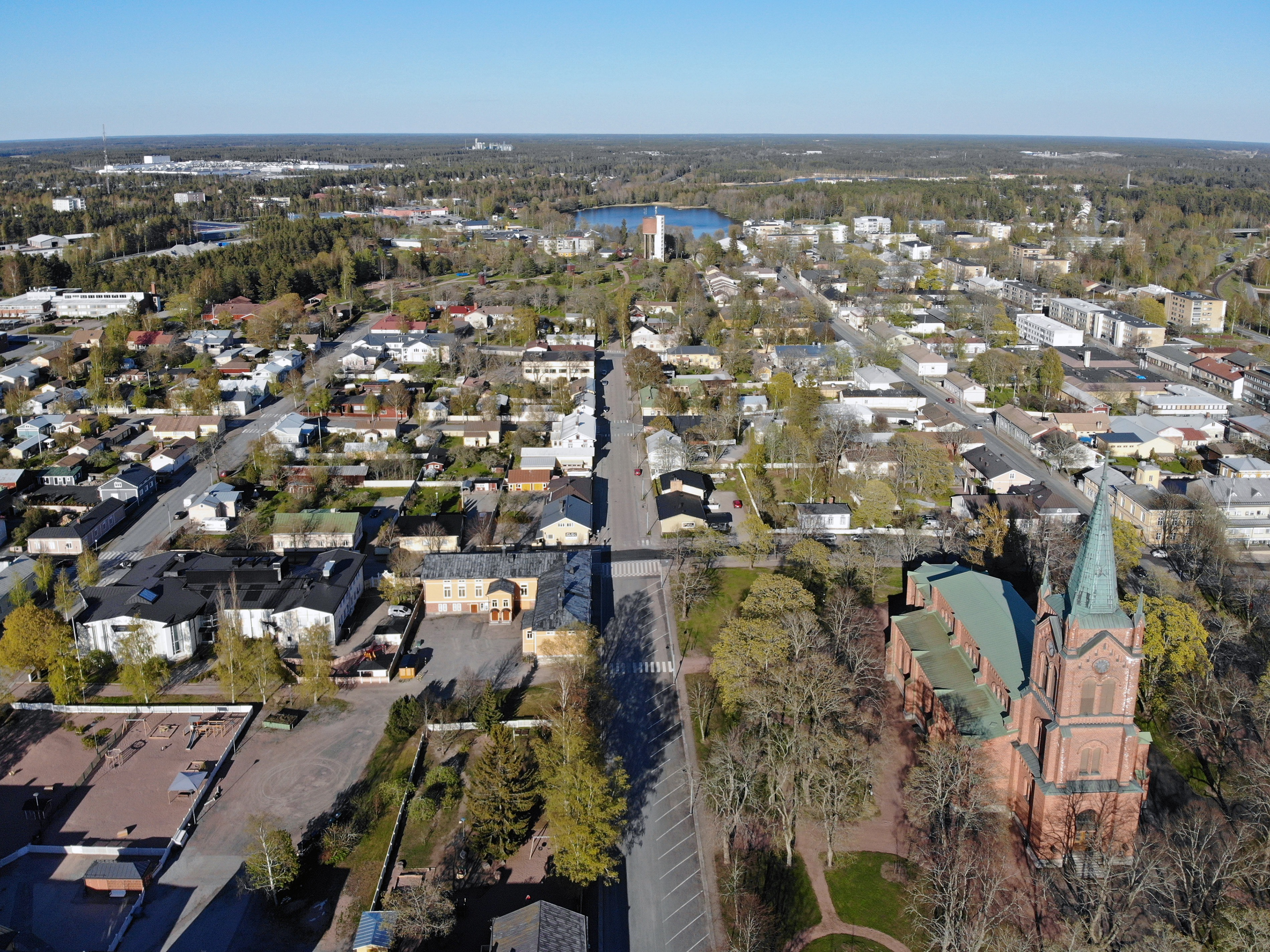

- Coat of arms

- Location of Uusikaupunki in Finland
- Interactive map of Uusikaupunki
- Coordinates: 60°48′N 021°25′E
- Country: Finland
- Region: Southwest Finland
- Sub-region: Vakka-Suomi
- Charter: April 19, 1617

Government
  - Town manager: Atso Vainio

Area (2018-01-01)
  - Town: 1,932.42 km^{2} (746.11 sq mi)
  - Land: 503.22 km^{2} (194.29 sq mi)
  - Water: 1,430.07 km^{2} (552.15 sq mi)
  - Metro: 502.49 km^{2} (194.01 sq mi)
  - Rank: 173rd largest in Finland

Population (2025-12-31)
  - Town: 14,783
  - Rank: 77th largest in Finland
  - Density: 29.38/km^{2} (76.1/sq mi)
  - Urban density: 30.63/km^{2} (79.3/sq mi)

Population by native language
  - Finnish: 89.5% (official)
  - Swedish: 0.3%
  - Others: 10.1%

Population by age
  - 0 to 14: 13.3%
  - 15 to 64: 57.4%
  - 65 or older: 29.3%
- Time zone: UTC+02:00 (EET)
  - Summer (DST): UTC+03:00 (EEST)
- Climate: Dfb
- Website: uusikaupunki.fi/en

Uusikaupunki (Finnish: [ˈuːsiˌkɑu̯puŋki]; Swedish: Nystad, Finland Swedish: [nyːstɑːd]; also known as Vasaborg) is a town and municipality of Finland. It is located in the Southwest Finland region, 71 kilometres (44 mi) northwest of Turku and 97 kilometres (60 mi) south of Pori. The municipality has a population of 14,783 (31 December 2025) and covers an area of 551.65 square kilometres (212.99 sq mi) of which 49.04 km^{2} (18.93 sq mi) is inland water. The population density is 29.38 inhabitants per square kilometre (76.1/sq mi).

The municipality is unilingually Finnish. Both its Finnish and Swedish names translate literally to "new town". The original name of the main village that was incorporated into Uusikaupunki was Kalainen (roughly translated from Finnish as "rich in fish"). The surrounding region, and especially the neighboring town of Kalanti, which merged with Uusikaupunki in 1993, was already a lively marketplace for wooden objects and salt in the early Middle Ages. Uusikaupunki was founded to legalize this trade.

== Geography ==
Uusikaupunki is located in the Vakka-Suomi sub-region on the shores of the Gulf of Bothnia. The Sirppu River (Sirppujoki) flows through the town and flows into the reservoir of Uusikaupunki in the northern part of the town. The freshwater pool was built in 1965 when the bays of Velhovesi and Ruotsinvesi were dammed from the sea. The area of the basin is about 40 km², and the town and part of Vakka-Suomi get their domestic water from it. The acidity of the freshwater basin has caused some fish deaths as well as an overgrowth of aquatic plants.

In 2011, the Bothnian Sea National Park was established in the outer archipelago of Uusikaupunki. The area, named Finland's largest marine national park, begins in the south of the Kustavi archipelago and ends in the north in the Merikarvia archipelago.

=== Cityscape ===
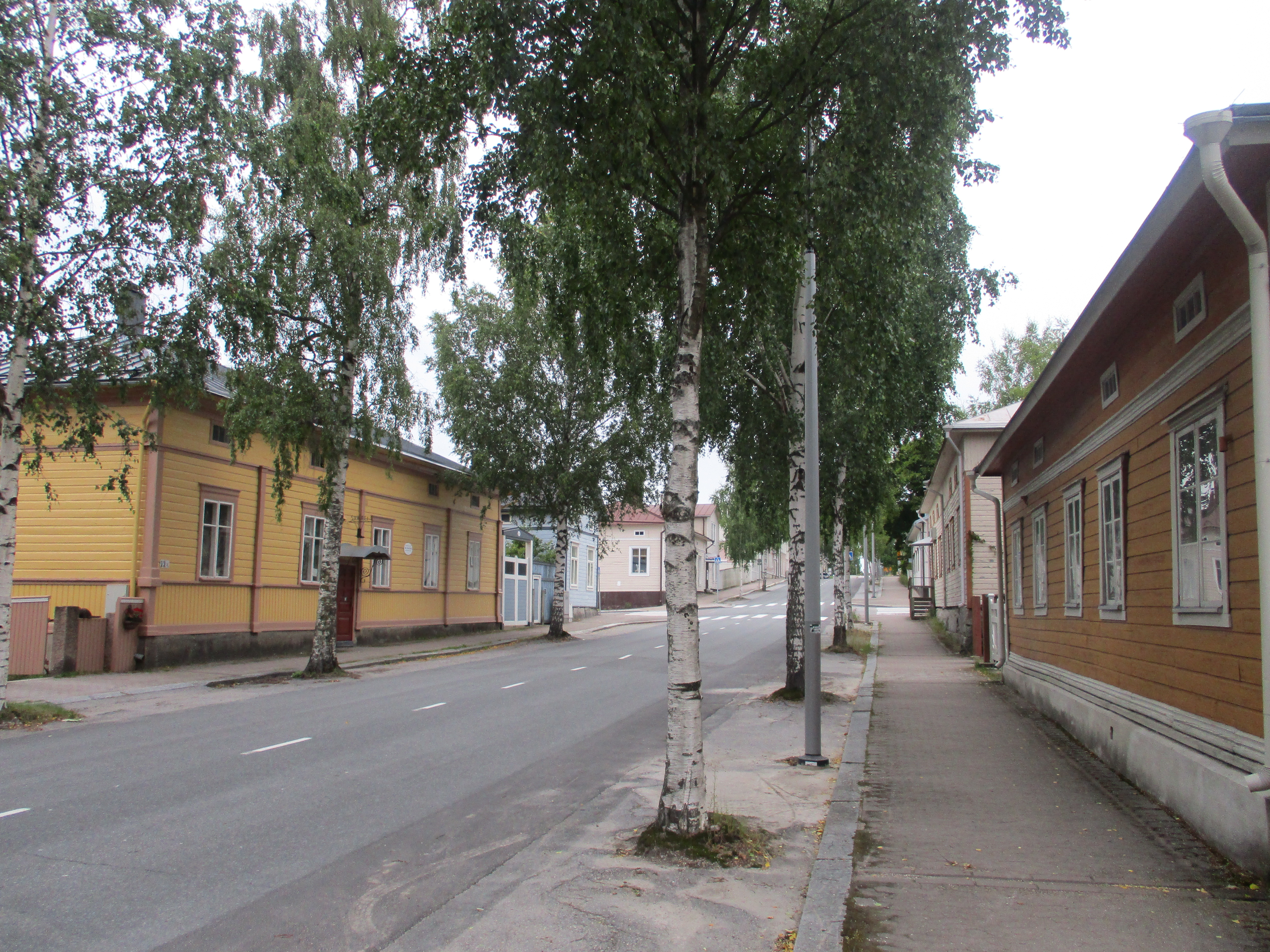
Old wooden blocks of Uusikaupunki

The center of Uusikaupunki is built according to the so-called "grid plan layout" and is one of the best-preserved Empire-style wooden house blocks in the country. Today, there are a total of 40 blocks left. Because of this, the area is characterized by wide streets and large blocks with the narrow alleys. In a town plan drawn up in 1649, there were 27 blocks in the town center that required residential buildings to be built. The town was built of densely red-soil houses, and the estates were not pleasantly considered deserted. The town also expanded around the base of the bay, where a suburban settlement was built. Green areas were not established in the town until the 1850s, when a new town plan was planned for the town.

According to the Finnish Heritage Agency, the town's most significant public buildings are the Seikow's school building and the Uusikaupunki's library building. Seikow's Neo-Renaissance building was one of the oldest school buildings in Finland. The town library is thought to be one of the oldest functioning library buildings in the country; it was founded in 1861. The first glass factory of Finland, which was located in Uusikaupunki, was destroyed in a fire in 1685. In the center of Uusikaupunki is the Bonk Centre museum, which houses a collection of products from the fictional Bonk Business Company. In addition, the town has a cultural history museum. A notable building in the town center is also Wallila, designed by F. A. Sjöström and located on a hill near the sea. It is now used as venue for Crusell Week music festival, which is named after composer-clarinetist Bernhard Crusell, who was born in Uusikaupunki.

== History ==
The town of Uusikaupunki was founded as a town with the rights of commerce on April 19, 1617 by decree by Gustav II Adolf. His daughter and successor, Queen Christina of Sweden, raised her illegitimate half-brother Gustav of Vasaborg to the dignity of a count when she gave him the Countship of Nystad in 1647, which led to the county town sometimes being called Vasaborg. In 1721, the Peace of Nystad was signed in Uusikaupunki, ending the Great Northern War between Sweden and Russia, but as the Crimean War broke out in 1853, Uusikaupunki was attacked by French Navy and British Navy in 1855 during the Åland War. Up to the 19th century, Uusikaupunki was an important port for commerce and fishing, and up to the latter half of the 20th century, the Port of Uusikaupunki retained an important ship-building industry.

== Economy ==
Uusikaupunki is the home of Valmet Automotive, a contract automobile mechanical production company, producing cars and vehicles for brands such as Mercedes-Benz. It was founded in 1968 as Saab-Valmet for manufacturing Saab cars. As of June 2017, Valmet is assembling Mercedes-Benz A-Class and Mercedes-Benz GLC-Class cars. Furthermore, it produces the first commercially available solar-electric vehicle - the Lightyear 0 - as of November 2022. Today, Valmet is one of the largest and most significant employers in Uusikaupunki.

== Politics ==
The results of the 2011 Finnish parliamentary election in Uusikaupunki were:

- Social Democratic Party 26.6%
- True Finns 23.4%
- National Coalition Party 19.6%
- Centre Party 13.1%
- Left Alliance 8.1%
- Christian Democrats 4.2%
- Green League 2.3%
- Communist Party of Finland 0.7%
- Swedish People's Party 0.6%

== Points of interest ==
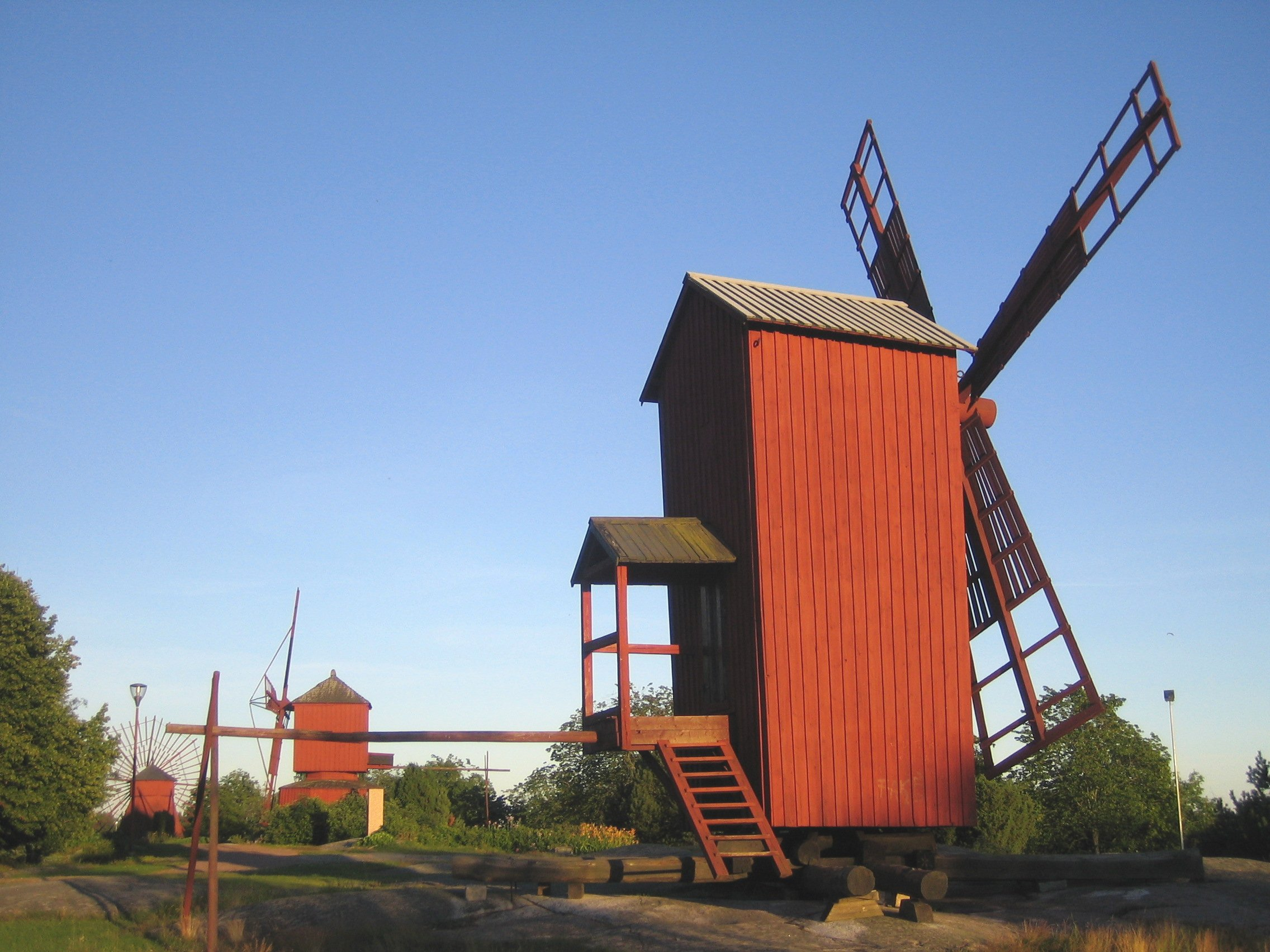
The windmills of Myllymäki

Uusikaupunki is home to the Bonk museum.

Other attractions include:

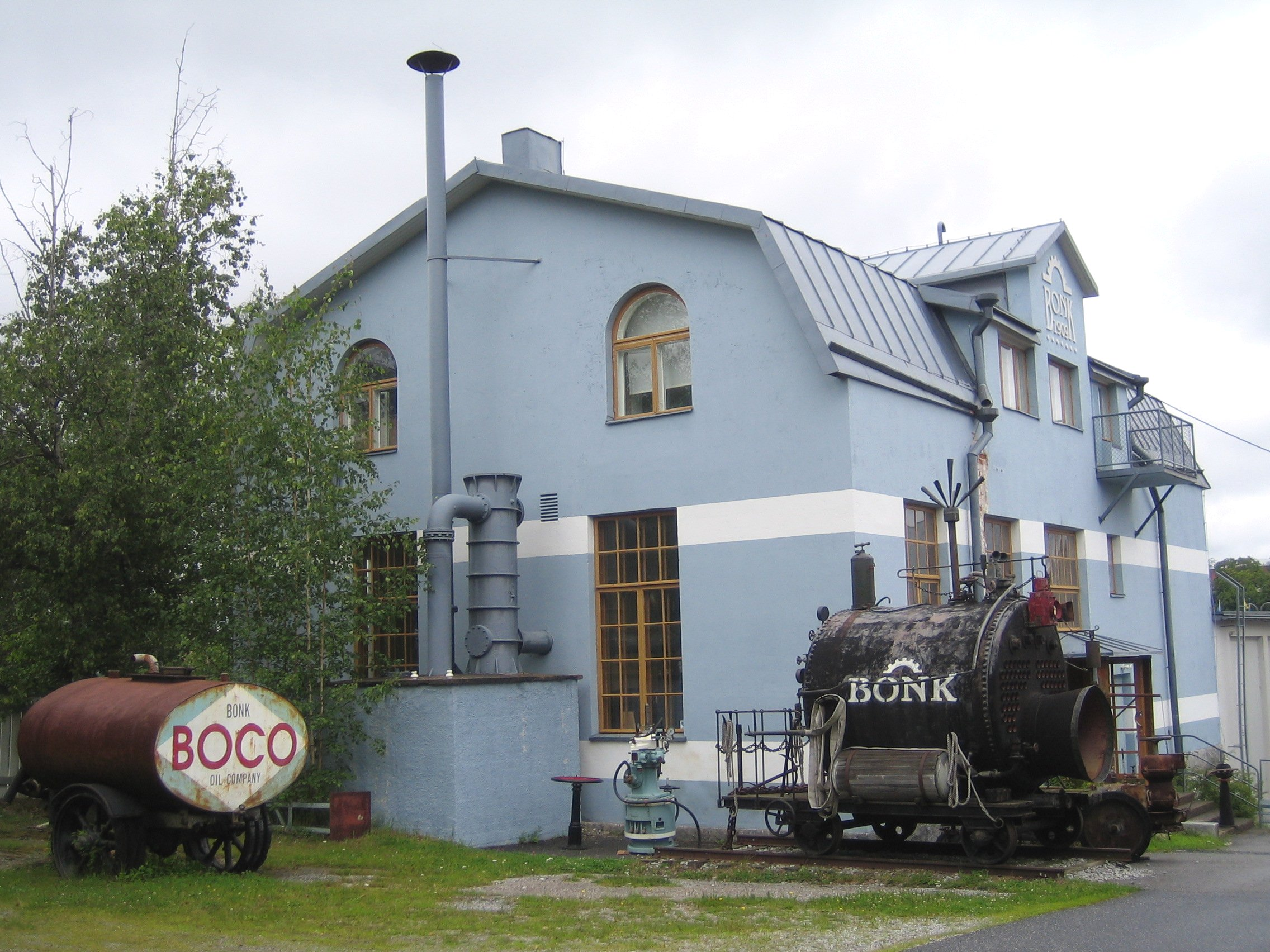
Bonk Business.

- Restaurant Pursiseuran Paviljonki
- Myllymäki Park

== Culture ==
=== Music ===
Karjurock, the annual rock music festival has been held in Uusikaupunki since 2007.

=== Sports ===
The town was co-host of the 1982 FIBA Europe Under-16 Championship for Women.

== Notable people ==
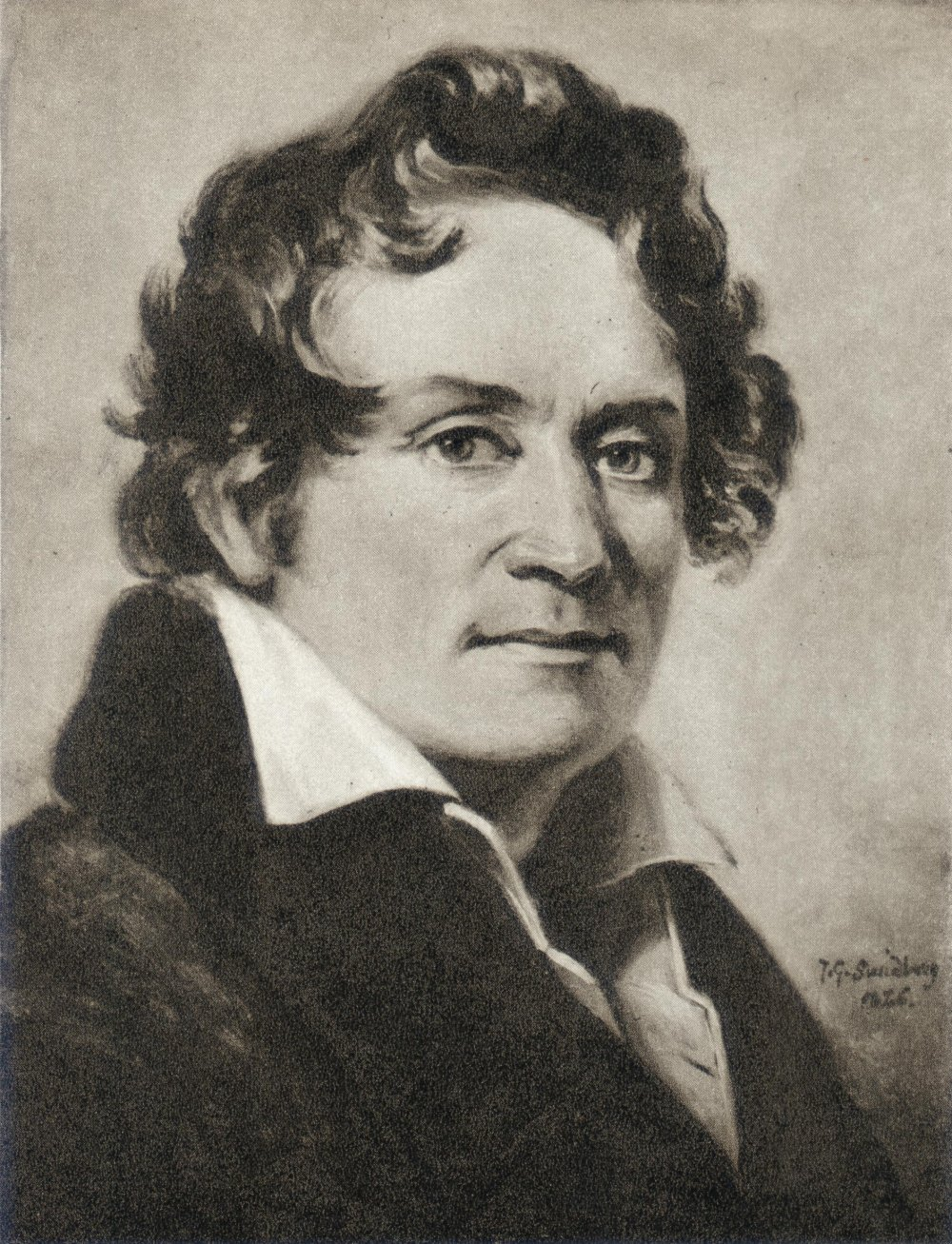
Bernhard Crusell (1775–1838)

- Aimo Cajander, Prime Minister of Finland (1922, 1924, 1937–39)
- Bernhard Henrik Crusell, virtuoso clarinetist and composer
- Robert Wilhelm Ekman, painter
- Anna Eriksson, singer
- Joni Haverinen (born 1987), ice hockey player
- Gordon Herbert, basketball coach and former player
- Eetu Koski (born 1992), ice hockey player
- Awak Kuier (born 2001), basketball player
- Jarmo Kuusisto (born 1961), ice hockey player
- Gerald Lee Sr., former basketball player
- Gerald Lee Jr., basketball player
- Aleksi Lehtonen, Archbishop of Finland (1945–1951)
- Johan Jakob Nervander, physicist, meteorologist and poet (1805–1848)
- Ilmari Saarelainen, actor
- Aulis Sallinen, composer
- Martti Simojoki, Archbishop of Finland (1964–78)
- Kari Takko (born 1962), ice hockey goaltender

== International relations ==
=== Twin towns – sister cities ===
Uusikaupunki is twinned with:

- Antsla, Estonia
- Haderslev, Denmark
- Veliky Novgorod, Novgorod Oblast, Russia
- Sandefjord, Norway
- Szentendre, Hungary
- Varberg, Sweden

== See also ==
- Kalanti
- Uusikaupunki Automobile Museum
