= Antti Kemppi =

Finnish politician

Antti Kemppi (9 July 1893, Antrea - 2 October 1974) was a Finnish farmer, lay preacher and politician. He was a member of the Parliament of Finland from 1927 to 1945, representing the Agrarian League.
