= Matts Björk =

Finnish judge and politician

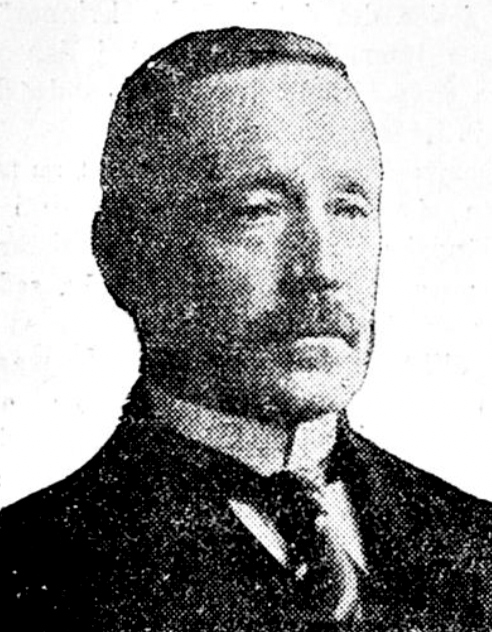
Matts Björk

Matts Viktor Björk (13 March 1867 in Gamlakarleby landskommun – 4 September 1936) was a Finnish lawyer and politician. He was a member of the Parliament of Finland from 1910 to 1913, from 1917 to 1919, from 1924 to 1927 and from 1930 to 1933, representing the Swedish People's Party of Finland (SFP).
