= Heikki Vehkaoja =

Finnish farmer and politician (1889–1954)

Heikki Vehkaoja (5 October 1889 – 30 November 1954) was a Finnish farmer and politician, born in Nurmo. He was a member of the Parliament of Finland from 1924 to 1939 and from 1945 to 1948, representing the Agrarian League.
