= Antti Soikkeli =

Finnish politician (1883–1937)

Antti Vilho Soikkeli (29 October 1883 – 17 January 1937) was a Finnish politician, born in Kuopio. He was a member of the Parliament of Finland from 1924 to 1927, representing the Socialist Electoral Organisation of Workers and Smallholders until 1926 and as an independent after that.
