= Vilho Hirvensalo =

Finnish agronomist, farmer and politician (1881–1937)

Vilho Hirvensalo (3 March 1881 – 7 January 1937; original surname Lagus) was a Finnish agronomist, farmer and politician, born in Iisalmi. He was a member of the Parliament of Finland from 1924 to 1927, representing the National Progressive Party. He was a presidential elector in the 1925 and 1931 presidential elections.
