= August Isaksson =

Finnish journalist and politician

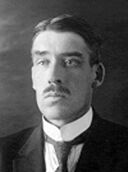
August Isaksson

Jakob August Isaksson (16 June 1886, Uudenkaarlepyyn maalaiskunta - 11 July 1929, Vaasa) was a Finnish journalist and politician. He was a member of the Parliament of Finland from 1924 until his death in 1929, representing the Socialist Electoral Organisation of Workers and Smallholders. He was the editor of Österbottens Folkblad, Folkbladet and Nya Folkbladet.
