= August Rytkönen =

Finnish politician

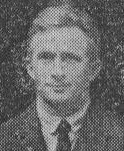
Rytkönen in 1922

August Rytkönen (24 December 1886, Iisalmen maalaiskunta – 18 December 1960) was a Finnish construction worker and politician. He served as a Member of the Parliament of Finland from 1922 to 1923, representing the Socialist Workers' Party of Finland (SSTP). He was imprisoned on sedition charges in 1923.
