= Oskar Jeppson =

Finnish politician

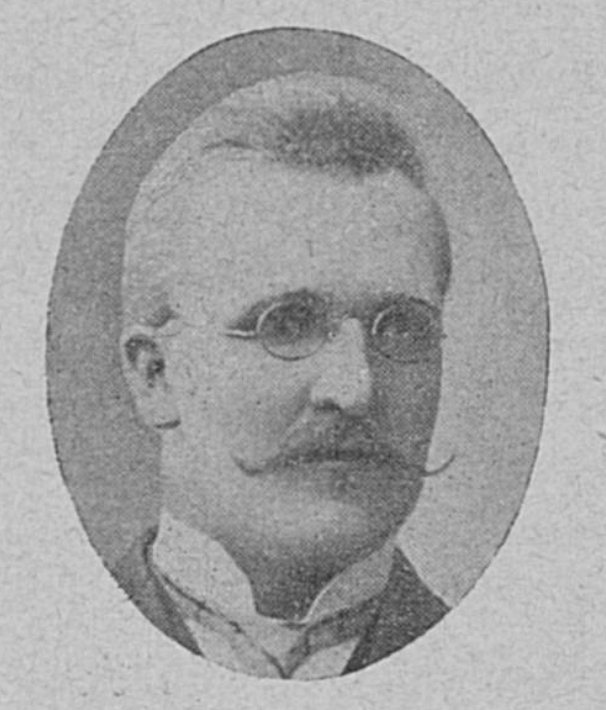
Oskar Jeppson in 1931

Karl Oskar Jeppson (5 January 1878, Närpes - 8 February 1931) was a Finnish farmer and politician. He was a member of the Parliament of Finland from 1922 to 1924, representing the Swedish People's Party of Finland (SFP).
