= Rosa Sillanpää =

Finnish politician

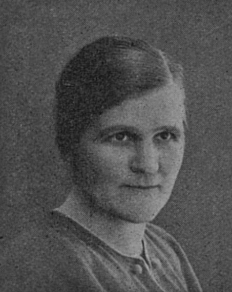
Rosa Sillanpää

Rosa Amanda Sillanpää (18 June 1888, in Hauho – 6 October 1929) was a Finnish trade union activist and politician. She was a Member of the Parliament of Finland from 1922 to 1923, representing the Socialist Workers' Party of Finland (SSTP). She was imprisoned on sedition charges from 1923 to 1926 and worked as a trade union official from 1926 to 1929.
