= Matti Pesonen =

Finnish politician

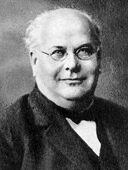
Matti Pesonen

Matti Pesonen (1 August 1868 - 11 December 1957) was a Finnish educationist and politician. He was born in Sääminki. He was a member of the Parliament of Finland, representing the Young Finnish Party from 1907 to 1908 and the National Coalition Party from 1922 to 1924.
