= Kaaperi Kivialho =

Finnish educator, bank director and politician (1884–1957)

Alli Gabriel (Kaaperi, A. K.) Kivialho (17 July 1884 – 28 April 1957; surname until 1904 Alander) was a Finnish educator, bank director and politician, born in Kisko. He was a member of the Parliament of Finland from 1923 to 1924, representing the National Progressive Party.
