= Kimmo Eronen =

Finnish ice hockey player

- Born: September 7, 1971 (age 53); Turku, FIN
- Height: 5 ft 9 in (175 cm)
- Weight: 185 lb (84 kg; 13 st 3 lb)
- Position: Defence
- Shoots: Left
- SM-liiga team Former teams: Jokerit; Ilves; TPS; Lukko
- Playing career: 1992–present

Kimmo Eronen (born September 7, 1971 in Turku, Finland) is a professional Finnish ice hockey player who split the 2009–10 season with Jokerit in the SM-liiga and TuTo and KooKoo of the Mestis. Since beginning his professional career in 1992, Eronen has also played in the Swedish Elitserien and Danish AL-Bank Ligaen.
