= Aukusti Eronen =

Finnish politician

Aukusti Eronen (21 August 1875, Rantasalmi – 15 November 1935) was a Finnish farmer and politician. He served as a Member of the Parliament of Finland from 1908 to 1909 and again from 1910 to 1911, representing the Finnish Party.
