= Elin Airamo =

Finnish politician (1886–1971)

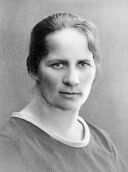
Elin Airamo, née Fagerholm

Elin Vilhelmiina Airamo (née Fagerholm; 25 May 1886 – 16 December 1971) was a Finnish office worker and politician. She was born in Helsinki. She was a member of the Parliament of Finland, representing the Socialist Workers' Party of Finland (SSTP) from 1922 to 1923. When the SSTP was outlawed in 1923, she was imprisoned on sedition charges until 1926.

== Biography ==
Born in the working-class district of Sörnäinen in Helsinki, Fagerholm went to folk school and business school. After the death of his mother, he had to look after his siblings from a young age. Fagerholm joined the labour movement in 1903, when he became a member of the Sörnäinen Workers' Association. In October 1905, Fagerholm was one of the founders of the women's section of the STY. In 1907 she got a job as a branch clerk at Osuusliike Elanto.

In October 1917, Fagerholm was elected to the Federal Committee of the Social Democratic Women's League. Fagerholm was largely absent from the events of the Civil War. She was only elected to the Economic Committee appointed by the Red Helsinki City Council a few days before the evacuation of the People's Delegation to Vyborg. At the end of the war, Fagerholm was, together with Hilda Öberg, the only member of the Women's League's Federal Committee who had not been imprisoned or fled the country. During the autumn, she began to reorganise the activities of the Women's League with Öberg and Fiina Pietikäinen, a deputy member of the League Commission. At the Union meeting in December 1918, Fagerholm was elected president of the Women's Union.
