= Socialist Workers' Party of Finland =

Socialist Workers' Party of Finland Suomen Sosialistinen Työväenpuolue
- Founded: 13 May 1920
- Dissolved: 3 August 1923
- Split from: Social Democratic Party of Finland
- Succeeded by: Socialist Electoral Organisation of Workers and Smallholders
- Newspaper: Suomen Työmies (Suomen Työläinen)
- Youth wing: Social Democratic Youth League of Finland
- Women's wing: Social Democratic Women's League of Finland
- Children's wing: Työväen Järjestönuorten Liitto
- Membership (1922): 24,398
- Ideology: Socialism
- Political position: Left-wing

Socialist Workers' Party of Finland (Finnish: Suomen Sosialistinen Työväenpuolue, SSTP) was a Finnish political party in the early 1920s. The SSTP consisted of radical leftists who split from the Social Democratic Party of Finland after the Finnish Civil War of 1918. The banned Communist Party of Finland (SKP) was the main force behind the party but other socialists were also involved. The SSTP was banned in 1923 and its leading members, including 27 members of parliament, were jailed. The party was succeeded by the Socialist Electoral Organisation of Workers and Smallholders (1924–1930).

The SSTP was established on 13 May 1920 at the Helsinki Workers' House. The founding congress was attended by 82 delegates, representing 42 different organisations. The decision to found a new party was made after the left lost the battle inside the SDP. An interim party leadership had already been chosen earlier and it led the organisation until the congress. A number of Social Democratic Party organisations joined the new party and they formed the basic organisation for the SSTP. Most of the SSTP founders had been involved in the civil war.

On the second day of the founding congress, the SSTP decided to join the Communist International, after which the police dispersed the meeting and arrested the participants, some of whom were later sentenced to imprisonment. It took a while for the activists to get the organisation back in form after the arrests. Eventually, the Helsinki municipal Socialist Organisation took the lead. It proclaimed itself the party on June 19, adopted the basic documents of the founding congress and chose the party leadership. Metal worker Jaakko Kivi was elected the chairman of SSTP. SSTP's program was written by Otto Wille Kuusinen, member of the Central Committee of the SKP.

The SSTP participated in the 1922 parliamentary elections. Finnish Workers' Central Election Committee was formed on February 24, 1922 by representatives of the SSTP, Finnish Trade Union Federation (SAJ), Social Democratic Youth League of Finland and Social Democratic Women's League of Finland. Election Committee set up 130 candidates, in all electoral constituencies. The SSTP received a total of 128,121 votes (14.8%) and 27 MPs (including 6 women).

In 1922, the SSTP had 24,398 members and 706 basic organisations.

The other Finnish parties called for the SSTP's abolition and its members were imprisoned on a regular basis. The party newspapers were constantly in trouble with the censorship. In early 1923, the SSTP changed its name to Workers' Party of Finland (Suomen Työväenpuolue, STP), removing reference to socialism. On 3 August 1923, the STP parliamentary group, members of party committee, the secretariat and district organisation leaders, and other members of staff were arrested. The arrests and ban were justified with alleged links to the illegal Communist Party.

== Chairmen ==
August Raatikainen	17.2.–14.5.1920	(temporary party committee)
Jaakko Kivi	16.6.–28.12.1920	
Hjalmar Eklund	28.12.1920–26.1.1922	
Niilo Wälläri	31.1.–31.3.1922	(temporary party committee)
Niilo Wälläri	1.4.1922–17.5.1923	
Toivo Hjalmar Långström	17.5.–3.8.1923	(Suomen Työväenpuolue)

== Members of parliament ==
- Elin Airamo (1922–1923)
- Toivo Aronen (1922–1923)
- Jaakko Enqvist (1922–1923)
- Väinö Hannula (1922–1923)
- Hilda Hannunen (1920–1923)
- Frans Hiilos (1922–1923)
- Laura Härmä (1922–1923)
- Antti Kaarne (1922-1923)
- Albert Kallio (1922–1923)
- Kalle Kankari (1922–1923)
- Pekka Kemppi (1922–1923)
- Aukusti Koivisto (1922–1923)
- Kalle Lampinen (1922–1923)
- Toivo Hjalmar Långström (1922–1923)
- Emmi Mäkelin (1922–1923)
- Heikki Mäkinen (1922–1923)
- Antti Nahkala (1922–1923)
- Pekka Nurmiranta (1922–1923)
- Hannes Pulkkinen (1922–1923)
- August Rytkönen (1922–1923)
- Rosa Sillanpää (1922–1923)
- Kalle Toppinen (1922–1923)
- Lempi Tuomi (1922–1923)
- Vihtori Vainio (1923–1923)
- Ville Vainio (1920–1923)
- Yrjö Valkama (1922–1923)
- Juho Vesterlund (1922–1923)
- Matti Väisänen (1922)

== See also ==
- Category:Socialist Workers Party of Finland politicians
- List of Communist Party (Finland) breakaway parties
- List of Social Democratic Party (Finland) breakaway parties
