= Hilda Hannunen =

Finnish politician

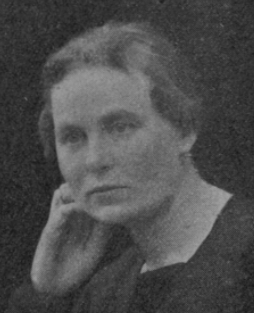
Hannunen in the 1920s

Hilda Maria Hannunen (29 August 1882 – ?) was a Finnish weaver and politician. Born in Laukaa, she was a member of the Parliament of Finland, representing the Social Democratic Party of Finland from 1920 to 1922 and the Socialist Workers' Party of Finland (SSTP) from 1922 to 1923. When the SSTP was banned in 1923 and the authorities ordered her to be imprisoned because of her political activities, she fled to the Soviet Union. There she worked as the director of a retirement home in Valaam after 1944, but nothing is known about her later life.
