= Heikki Mäkinen =

Finnish politician

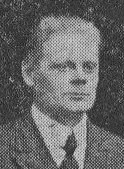
Mäkinen in 1922

Heikki Jalmari Mäkinen (12 June 1888 – 11 December 1960) was a Finnish house painter and politician, born in Tyrväntö. He was a Member of the Parliament of Finland from 1922 to 1924, representing the Socialist Workers' Party of Finland (SSTP).
