= Albert Kallio =

Finnish politician (1884–1945)

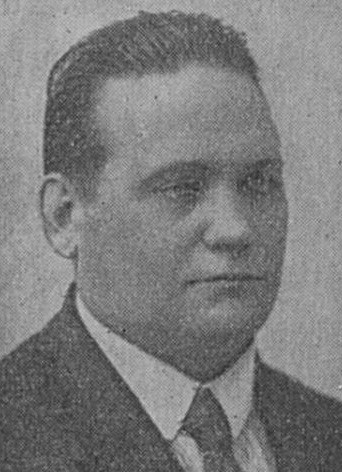
- Kallio, c. 1934

Member of the Parliament of Finland
- In office 5 September 1922 – 17 October 1923
- Constituency: Uusimaa

Personal details
- Born: Albert Viktor Paavonkallio; 20 August 1884 Nurmijärvi, Russian Empire
- Died: 17 August 1945 (aged 60) Espoo, Finland
- Party: Socialist Workers' Party

Albert Viktor Kallio (20 August 1884 – 17 August 1945) was a Finnish politician and member of the Parliament of Finland, the national legislature. A member of the Socialist Workers' Party, he represented Uusimaa between September 1922 and October 1923.

Kallio was born on 20 August 1884 in Nurmijärvi and spent six years in the US as a youth. He was an interpreter and master spinner at a weaving factory in Hyvinkää from 1904 to 1906. He was a janitor at a workers' house in Hyvinkää (1906-1912) and a master spinner at a spinning and weaving factory in Viljamaa, Orimattila (1912-1918). Kallio was imprisoned for political reasons following the end of the Finnish Civil War in 1918. Following release from prison in 1920, he resumed working as a janitor at a workers' house in Hyvinkää, from 1920 to 1923. He was a district insurance manager in Lahti and Pori for the Kaleva Mutual Insurance Company from 1929 to 19237. He was a foreman at a felt factory in Kirvu (1937-1940) and a district insurance manager in Hyvinkää until 1945. He was a member of the municipal councils in Hyvinkää and Lahti. He died on 17 August 1945 in Espoo.
