= Olli Hirvensalo =

Finnish agronomist, farmer and politician (1882–1956)

Lassi Olli (Lars Olof, L. O.) Hirvensalo (29 July 1882 – 9 July 1956; surname until 1906 Lagus) was a Finnish agronomist, farmer and politician, born in Iisalmi. He was a member of the Parliament of Finland from 1922 to 1924 and from 1930 to 1951, representing the Agrarian League. He was a presidential elector in the 1925, 1937, 1940, 1943 and 1950 presidential elections.
