= Svantte Vuorio =

Finnish farmer and politician (1890–1971)

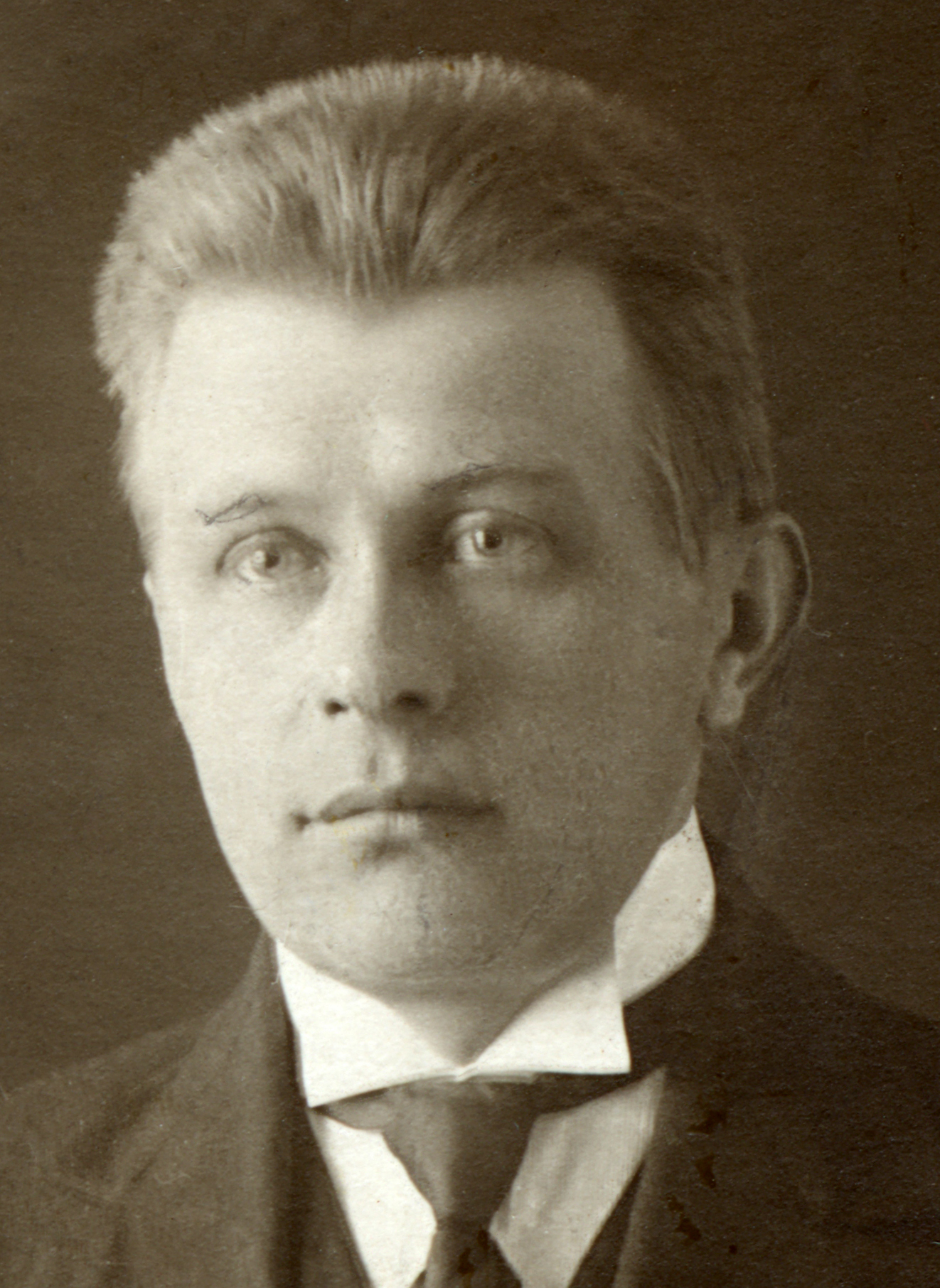
Svantte Vuorio (c. 1930)

Svantte Ferdinand Vuorio (18 August 1890 – 17 January 1971; original surname Sandelin) was a Finnish farmer and politician, born in Huittinen. He was a member of the Parliament of Finland from 1924 to 1925, representing the Socialist Electoral Organisation of Workers and Smallholders.
