= Väinö Kivilinna =

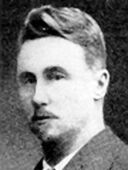
Väinö Kivilinna

Väinö Gabriel Kivilinna (13 October 1875, Turku - 18 March 1950; surname until 1906 Borg) was a Finnish secondary school teacher, temperance movement activist and politician. He was a member of the Parliament of Finland, representing the Finnish Party from 1907 to 1909 and the Agrarian League from 1922 to 1924.
