= Emmi Mäkelin =

Finnish midwife and politician (1874–1962)

Emmi Mäkelin MP
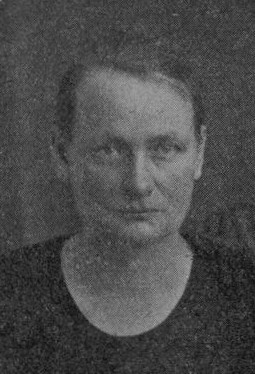

Member of Parliament for Kuopio Province
- In office 5 September 1922 – 17 October 1923

Personal details
- Born: Emma Serafia Lindeman; 1 April 1874 Lappi, Grand Duchy of Finland, Russian Empire
- Died: 6 August 1962 (aged 88) Jyväskylä, Finland
- Party: SSTP
- Spouse: Antti Mäkelin (m. 1901)
- Children: 3

Emma "Emmi" Serafia Mäkelin (1 April 1874 – 6 August 1962) was a Finnish midwife and politician who served in the Parliament of Finland from 1922 until 1923. A member of the communist Socialist Workers' Party of Finland, she represented the western portion of the Kuopio Province.

== Biography ==
Emma Serafia Mäkelin was born on 1 April 1874, in the town of Lappi, Finland, then part of the Russian Empire. Her father, Karl Fredrik Lindeman, was a construction foreman. She received a secondary school education, and became a certified midwife in 1904. She worked as a midwife in the central city of Kuopio from 1904 until 1931.

Following Finland's independence from Russia in 1917, Mäkelin became involved in the politics of the new nation. She joined the communist Socialist Workers' Party of Finland (SSTP), and was elected to the Kuopo City Council in 1918. She was also a member of the Social Democratic Women's Union of Finland, though she left the organization in 1920 following a split between the communists and social democrats. In the 1922 Finnish parliamentary election, Mäkelin was elected to the Parliament of Finland, representing the western portion of the Kuopio Province. Mäkelin was one of six female SSTP MPs, and was the most educated and oldest of the group.

Later in 1922, Mäkelin was part of a group of 25 communist MPs who proposed the creation of a new Finnish Socialist Soviet Republic. She was arrested in August 1923 during a crackdown on communists, though she was released the following year. In October 1923, while imprisoned, she was expelled from parliament. Mäkelin continued working as a midwife after retiring from politics. She died on 6 August 1962 in Jyväskylä.
