= Otto Pensas =

Finnish politician (1885–1940)

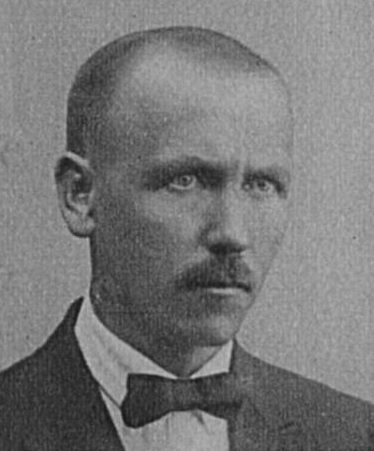
Member of the Parliament of Finland Otto Pensas (1885-1940).

Otto Pensas (1885 – 10 August 1940) was a Finnish politician, born in Jeppo. He was a member of the Parliament of Finland from 1924 to 1930, representing the Social Democratic Party of Finland (SDP). He was a presidential elector in the 1925 Finnish presidential election.
