= Laura Härmä =

Finnish politician

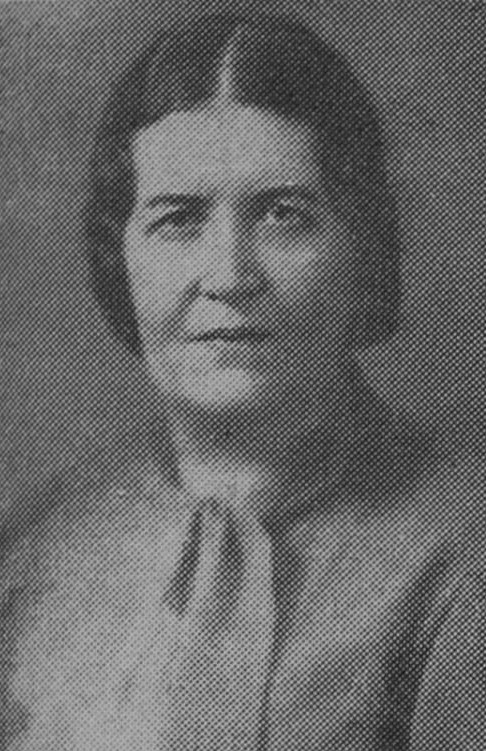
Laura Härmä

Anna Laura Härmä (née Numminen; 4 October 1891 – 2 May 1952) was a Finnish trade union functionary and politician. She was born in Urjala. She was a member of the Parliament of Finland, representing the Socialist Workers' Party of Finland (SSTP) from 1922 to 1923 and the Social Democratic Party of Finland (SDP) from 1941 to 1944. When the SSTP was banned in 1923, she was imprisoned on sedition charges. She was later active in the Left Group of Finnish Workers, and in the Social Democratic Party of Finland after that.
