= Joni Haverinen =

Finnish ice hockey player

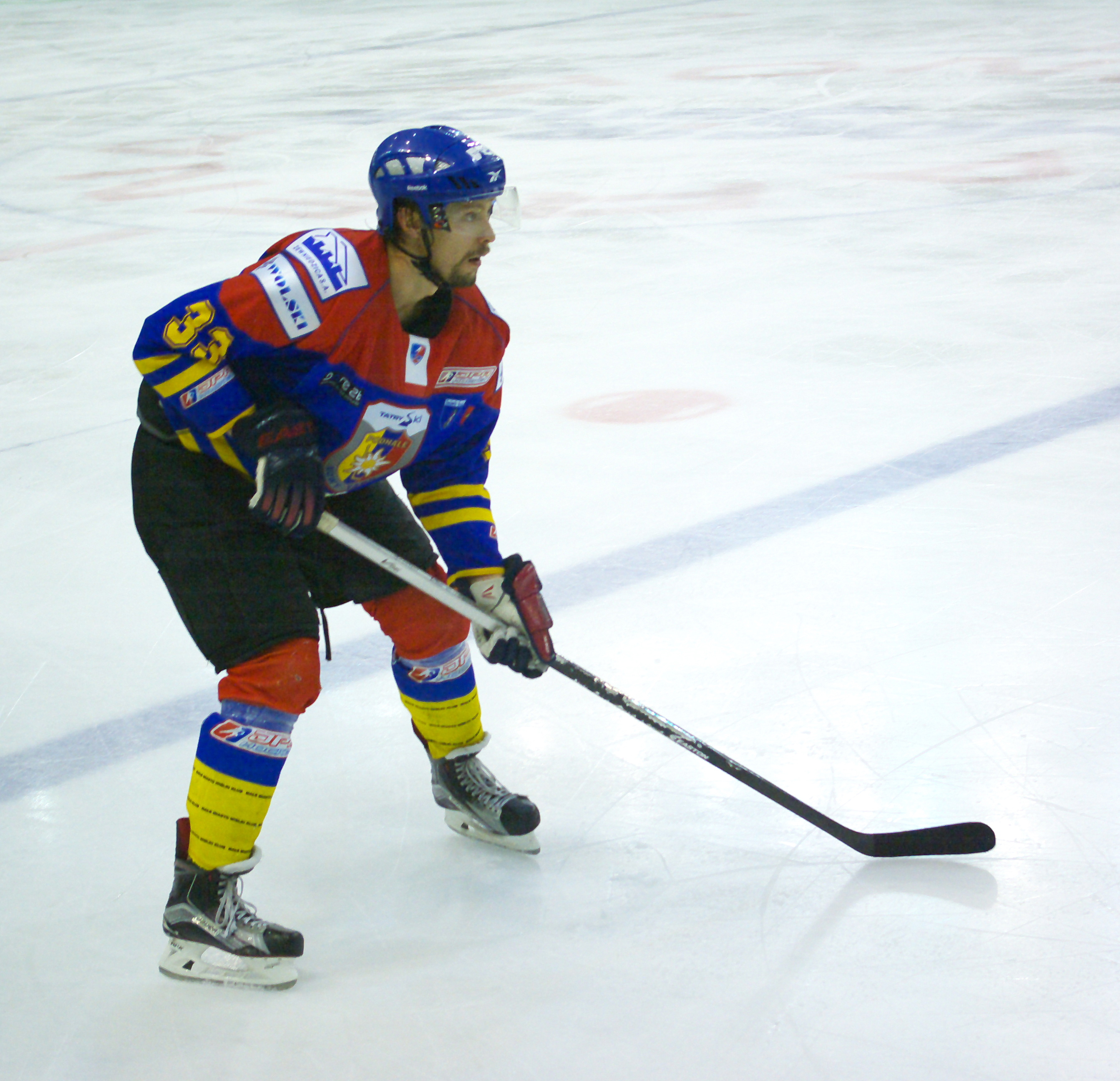
- Born: May 17, 1987 (age 37); Uusikaupunki, Finland
- Height: 6 ft 2 in (188 cm)
- Weight: 198 lb (90 kg; 14 st 2 lb)
- Position: Defence
- Shoots: Left
- Finland2 team Former teams: Sport; SM-liiga; HIFK; HPK; KalPa
- NHL draft: Undrafted
- Playing career: 2007–present

Joni Haverinen (born May 17, 1987) is a Finnish professional ice hockey defenceman who currently plays for HPK of the SM-liiga.
