= Pravdino =

Pravdino (Russian: Правдино) is the name of several rural localities in Russia:

- Pravdino, Guryevsky District, Kaliningrad Oblast, a settlement in Khrabrovsky Rural Okrug of Guryevsky District in Kaliningrad Oblast
- Pravdino, Krasnoznamensky District, Kaliningrad Oblast, a settlement in Dobrovolsky Rural Okrug of Krasnoznamensky District in Kaliningrad Oblast
- Pravdino, Krasnoselskoye Settlement Municipal Formation, Vyborgsky District, Leningrad Oblast, a settlement in Krasnoselskoye Settlement Municipal Formation of Vyborgsky District in Leningrad Oblast; 60°33′N 29°34′E
- Pravdino, Svetogorskoye Settlement Municipal Formation, Vyborgsky District, Leningrad Oblast, a settlement under the administrative jurisdiction of Svetogorskoye Settlement Municipal Formation in Vyborgsky District of Leningrad Oblast; 61°01′N 28°51′E
- Pravdino (selo), Yaroslavl Oblast, a selo in Nekouzsky Rural Okrug of Nekouzsky District in Yaroslavl Oblast
- Pravdino (village), Yaroslavl Oblast, a village in Nekouzsky Rural Okrug of Nekouzsky District in Yaroslavl Oblast
