= Noora Koponen =

Finnish politician

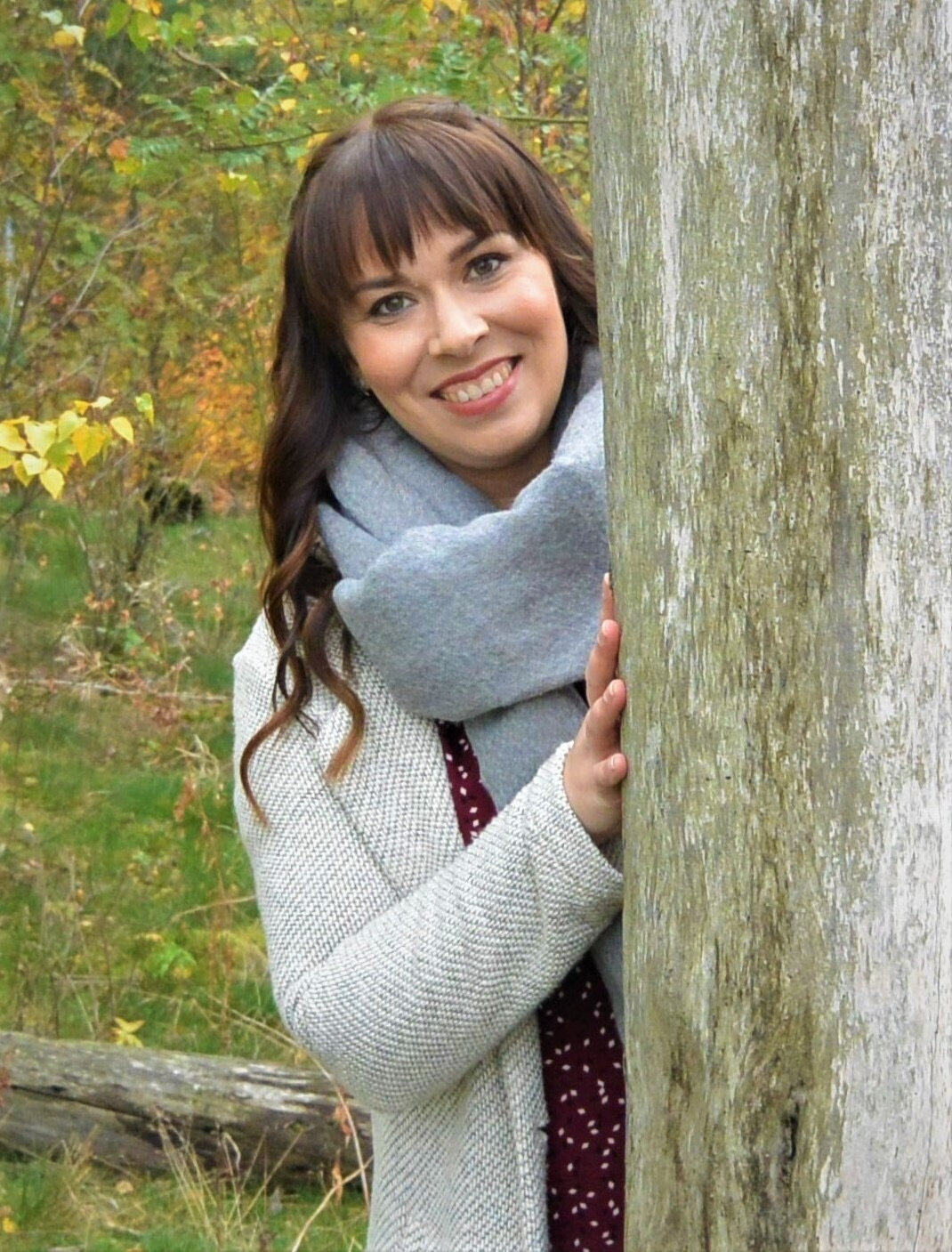

Member of the Finnish Parliament for Uusimaa

Personal details
- Born: 12 July 1983 (age 42) Kokkola, Central Ostrobothnia, Finland
- Party: Green League

Noora Riikka Koponen (born 12 July 1983 in Kokkola) is a Finnish politician currently serving in the Parliament of Finland for the Green League at the Uusimaa constituency.
