= Johannes Inborr =

Finnish farmer and politician (1867–1939)

Johan (Johannes) Inborr (9 February 1867 – 6 July 1939) was a Finnish farmer and politician, born in Pedersöre. He was a member of the Parliament of Finland from 1909 to 1919 and from 1922 to 1933, representing the Swedish People's Party of Finland.
