= 1922 Finnish parliamentary election =

General election

- 1–3 July 1922

All 200 seats in the Parliament of Finland 101 seats needed for a majority
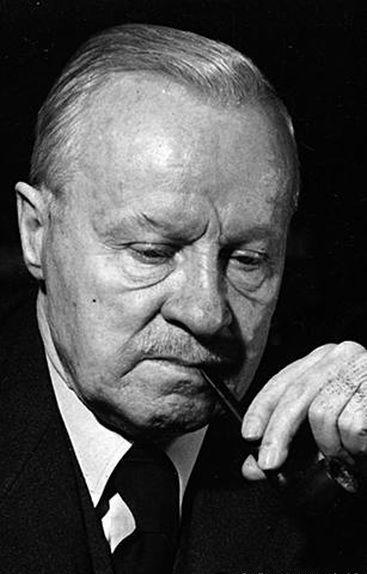

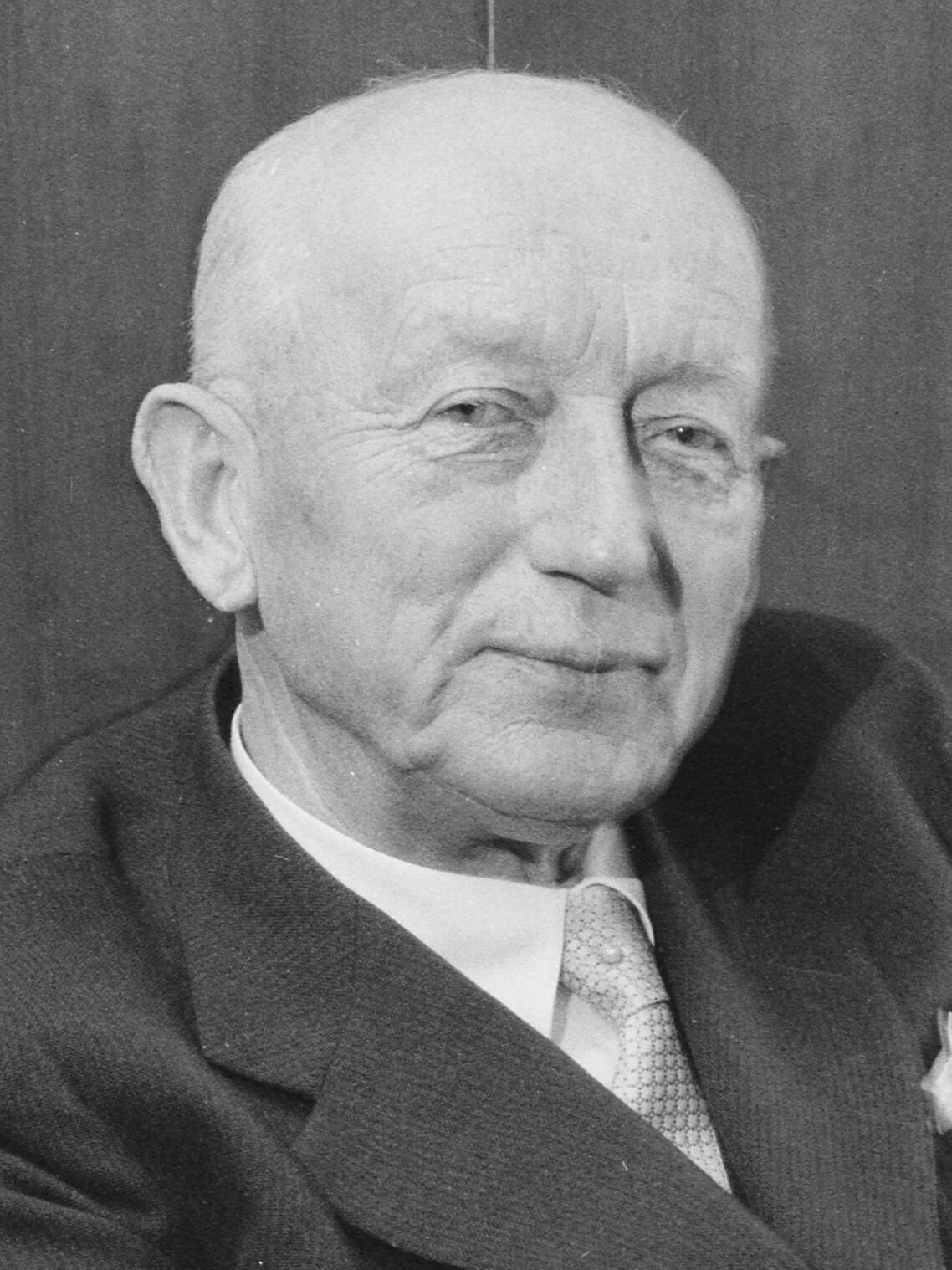

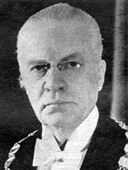

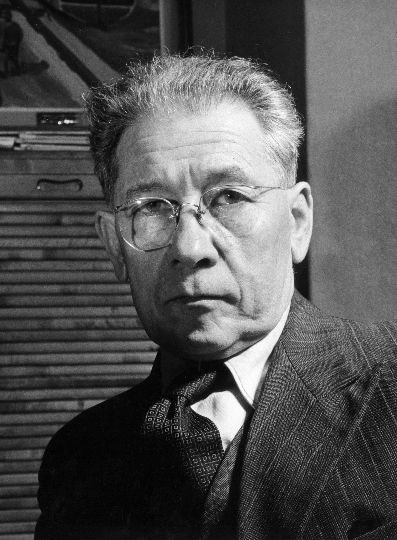

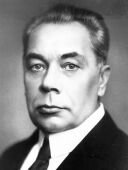
	First party	Second party	Third party
Leader	Väinö Tanner	Pekka Heikkinen	Antti Tulenheimo
Party	SDP	Agrarian	National Coalition
Last election	37.98%, 80 seats	19.70%, 42 seats	15.71%, 26 seats
Seats won	53	45	35
Seat change	▼27	▲3	▲9
Popular vote	216,861	175,401	157,116
Percentage	25.06%	20.27%	18.15%
Swing	▼12.92pp	▲0.57pp	▲2.44pp
	Fourth party	Fifth party	Sixth party
Leader	Niilo Wälläri	Eric von Rettig	Oskari Mantere
Party	Socialist Workers'	RKP	National Progressive
Last election	–	12.13%, 22 seats	12.81%, 26 seats
Seats won	27	25	15
Seat change	new	▲3	▼11
Popular vote	128,181	107,414	79,676
Percentage	14.81%	12.41%	9.21%
Swing	new	▲0.28pp	▼3.60pp
Prime Minister before election
Aimo Cajander
Independent
Prime Minister after election
Kyösti Kallio
Agrarian

Parliamentary elections were held in Finland between 1 and 3 July 1922. The Social Democratic Party remained the largest in Parliament with 53 of the 200 seats. The caretaker government of Professor Aimo Cajander (Progressive), that President Kaarlo Juho Ståhlberg had appointed in June 1922, following the resignation of Prime Minister Juho Vennola (Progressive), remained in office until Kyösti Kallio formed an Agrarian-Progressive minority government in November 1922. Voter turnout was 58.5%.

== Background ==
By 1922, the Finnish society, economy and politics had begun to stabilize. The Progressive (liberal) President Kaarlo Juho Ståhlberg had pardoned many Red (socialist) prisoners of the Finnish Civil War, the worst poverty caused by World War I and the Civil War was over, and the Agrarian leader, Kyösti Kallio, was preparing a law (Lex Kallio) that would distribute the excess farmlands of wealthy landowners to the former tenant farmers and other landless rural people. The Social Democrats, led by Väinö Tanner, had committed themselves to the peaceful and democratic pursuit of socialist reform goals. The mostly Agrarian-Progressive minority governments pursued moderate and conciliatory policies. Compulsory schooling of Finnish children was enacted in 1921. The Communists dared to organize the Socialist Workers' Party before the elections, so they preferred open political activity to underground political activity. Shortly before the election campaign officially started, the Finnish Parliament rejected a five-year defence treaty between Finland, Poland, Latvia and Estonia. Enough deputies doubted the ability of Poland and the Baltic countries to defend Finland during a real war.

== Results ==
Party	Votes	%	Seats	+/–
Social Democratic Party	216,861	25.06	53	–27
Agrarian League	175,401	20.27	45	+3
National Coalition Party	157,116	18.15	35	+7
Socialist Workers' Party	128,181	14.81	27	New
Swedish People's Party	107,414	12.41	25	+3
National Progressive Party	79,676	9.21	15	–11
Others	772	0.09	0	–
Total	865,421	100.00	200	0
Valid votes	865,421	99.38		
Invalid/blank votes	5,404	0.62		
Total votes	870,825	100.00		
Registered voters/turnout	1,489,022	58.48		
Source: Nohlen & Stöver

== See also ==
- List of members of the Parliament of Finland, 1922–1924
- History of Finland § Finland in the inter-war era
