= Matti Pitkänen (politician) =

Finnish politician

Matti Pitkänen (22 November 1885, Sortavalan maalaiskunta - 11 June 1958) was a Finnish farmer and politician. He was a member of the Parliament of Finland from 1922 to 1936 and again from 1939 to 1945, representing the Agrarian League.
