= Tuomas Vanhala =

Finnish farmer and politician (1872–1959)

Tuomas Vanhala (10 March 1872 – 10 August 1959) was a Finnish farmer and politician, born in Kymi. He was a member of the Parliament of Finland from 1917 to 1919 and from 1922 to 1927, representing the Finnish Party until December 1918 and the National Coalition Party after that. He was a presidential elector in the 1937, 1940 and 1943 presidential elections.
