= Oliver Eronen =

Finnish politician

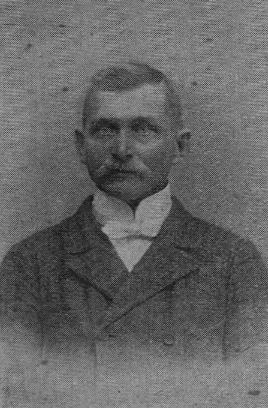

Oliver Eronen (28 May 1865 in Joroinen – 2 October 1939) was a Finnish farmer and politician. He was a member of the Parliament of Finland from 1907 to 1919 and again from 1922 to 1924, representing the Social Democratic Party of Finland (SDP). He was imprisoned from 1918 to 1919 for having sided with the Reds during the Finnish Civil War.
