= V.M.J. Viljanen =

Finnish engineer, business executive and politician

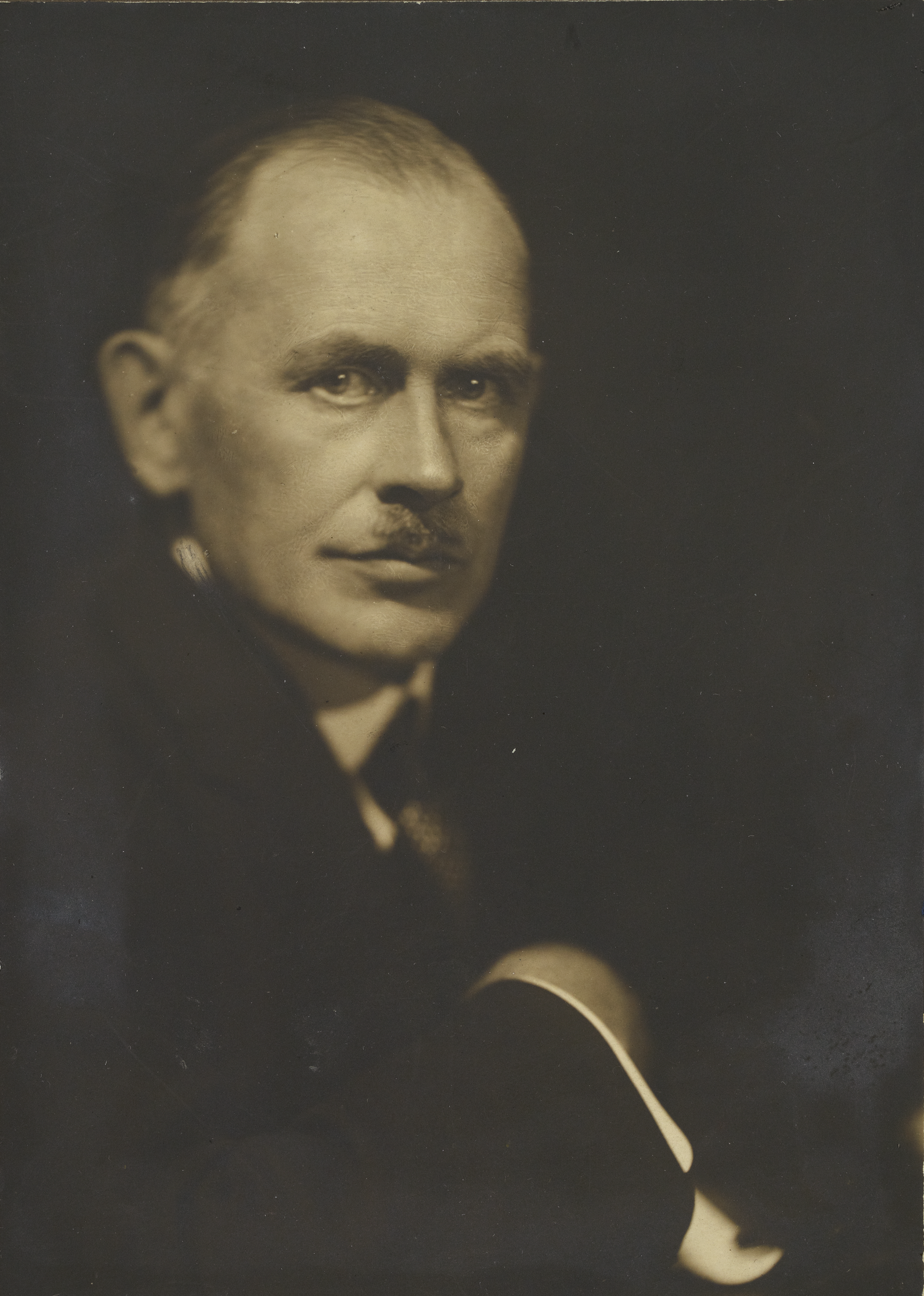
V.M.J Viljanen

Väinö Matti Juho (V.M.J.) Viljanen (24 November 1874, Tuusula – 2 September 1946) was a Finnish engineer, business executive and politician. He was a member of the Parliament of Finland from 1924 to 1927, representing the National Progressive Party.
