= Yrjö Welling =

Finnish politician

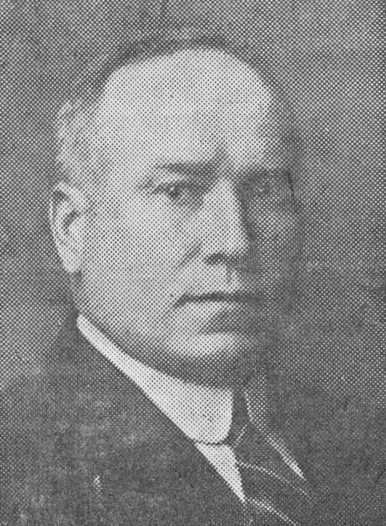

Member of Parliament
- In office May 9, 1922 – July 20, 1951
- Constituency: Kymi Electoral District (1948 – 1951) Kymi Eastern Electoral District (1945 – 1948) Vyborg Oblast Eastern Electoral District (1922 – 1945)

Personal details
- Born: February 15 1885 Kirvu
- Died: March 2, 1963 (aged 78)
- Party: Social Democratic Party of Finland

Yrjö Welling (15 February 1885, in Kirvu – 2 March 1963) was a Finnish farmer and politician. He was a member of the Parliament of Finland from 1922 to 1951, representing the Social Democratic Party of Finland (SDP). During the Continuation War, Welling was among the signatories of the "Petition of the Thirty-three", which was presented to President Ryti by members of the Peace opposition on 20 August 1

943.
