= Pekka Viljanen (politician) =

Finnish politician (born 1945)

Pekka Einari Viljanen (born 11 March 1945 in Vihti) is a Finnish farmer and politician. He was a member of the Parliament of Finland from 1991 to 1995, representing the Centre Party.
