= Vihtori Vainio =

Finnish politician

Juho Vihtori Vainio (2 August 1890, Jokioinen – 25 March 1942) was a Finnish filer and politician. He was a Member of the Parliament of Finland from 1922 to 1923, representing the Socialist Workers' Party of Finland (SSTP). He was imprisoned on sedition charges in 1923.
