= Oskari Jussila =

Finnish provost and vicar (1888–1955)

Oskari Heikki Jussila (Oskar Henrik; 16 April 1888, in Leppävirta, Finland – 24 April 1955, in Alatornio, Finland) was a Conservative Laestadian provost, vicar for multiple parishes, and the area provost of the Tornio area in 1938–1955. He also worked as editor for the religious newspapers Siionin lähetyslehti and Zions missionstidning in 1919–1945, as well as a member of parliament with the National Coalition Party in 1922–1929 and 1930–1933. Jussila's father was Heikki Jussila (1863–1955), a Conservative Laestadian lay preacher and Volksschule teacher.

== Education ==
After graduating Volksschule, Oskari Jussila went to oppikoulu in Kuopio classic lyceum in 1908 and began his theological studies in University of Helsinki, finishing them in 1913. During his studies, Jussila joined a Laestadian community, where he joined Conservative Laestadianism during the 1910 split. At the end of his studies he carried out interviews with Laestadians in the Torne Valley, which provided a robust connection to Laestadianism for him. He also made connections with the Laestadian movement in Calumet, Michigan, especially its local leaders Paul Heideman and his father Arthur Leopold Heideman. In the end of 1920, Jussila visited Michigan and Minnesota for four months, participating in the investigation of the dispersion within Heidemanism, the local Laestadian movement.

Oskari Jussila was ordinated a priest in Oulu in 1914. After this he worked temporary parish positions in Tyrnävä, Kiuruvesi, Suomussalmi, Säräisniemi, and Ranua. He held three vicarages during his life: in Ranua 1918–1920, in Kuivaniemi 1920–1934, and in Alatornio from 1934 until his death in 1955.

== Participation in the Finnish Civil War and Finnish activity in Northern Sweden ==
Even prior to the 1918 Finnish Civil War, Oskari Jussila supported the Whites. He participated in establishing the Ranua municipality White Guard. At the end of the civil war, Jussila worked as the manager of an ambulance, i.e. a mobile field hospital, provided by the Conservative Laestasianism movement. At the time, Jussila supported the view that the Reds should be severely punished for starting the riot. Starting from 1919, Jussila considered it important to support Fenno-nationalistic activity, with the purpose of "educating" the Finnish population of Norrbotten in Northern Sweden. He participated in the Länsipohjan toimikunta (lit. "Norrbotten task force"), established for that purpose. Jussila's work with pastoral care in the Finnish speaker populated areas of Northern Sweden in the 1920s attracted ill attention from the Swedish national circles. Their view on the matter was that Finns were using pastoral care as a cover for political agitation.

== Rise to influential position within Conservative Laestadianism ==
In the early 1920s, Oskari Jussila reached a central position as an influential cleric within the Conservative Laestadian movement. In 1919 he was made the editor of newspaper, movement organ Siionin Lähetyslehti. He worked in this position continuously until 1939, and after a break, in 1942–1944. His editorship was successful, and the newspaper even turned a profit. Jussila was active in voicing his negative opinions of the other 1920's Laestadian branches such as the New Awakening. His main concern was their "law-mindedness". In 1920, Jussila visited the Finnish regions in Northern United States, and condemned the local Apostolic Lutheran movement. His newspaper writings of the time tended to sharply counter those who would criticise Conservative Laestadianism in any way. During this time Jussila also actively worked towards creating a folk high school, and in 1923 he established the Ylitornio Christian Folk High School with support from the Conservative Laestadian movement.

== Parliament membership ==
In 1922, Jussila stood for the parliament membership elections with the National Coalition Party in the northern Oulu electoral district, and was elected. The other Laestadian parliament members were with the Agrarian League. At the time, the parliament was working on a freedom of religion bill. Jussila expressed his strict views, supporting to retain the religious education in Volksschule, and to retain the public and legal status of the Finnish Evangelical Lutheran Church. He also supported increasing or at least keeping the Church budget, and was considered one of the so-called "helmet-wearing priests", who demanded more attention in the national budget toward securing the country's internal and external security. Despite his religious political interests, Jussila's Conservative Laestadian affiliation did not come up in the parliament. Other themes in his work in the parliament was developing Lapland and Peräpohjola, the home regions of his voters.

== Final years and heritage ==
Up until his death, Oskari Jussila maintained his persuasion to remain faithful to his religious community. Since his death the relationship between the clergy and the Conservative Laestadianism grew more distant. Jussila's writings gained a central position in the Conservative Laedtadian Elämän Sana subgroup. The influence of the Elämän Sana group has dwindled since, and Jussila is better known as a religious composer and poet, with one hymn, "Käyn armonalttarillesi" being included in the Finnish Lutheran hymnal with the hymn number #316. In addition, the song collection Siionin laulut, compiled by Jussila since its establishment in 1916 until 1939, has created a lasting impression in the Laestadian movement.
