= Alpo Luostarinen =

Finnish politician

Alpo Luostarinen (4 June 1886, Enonkoski – 27 April 1948) was a Finnish farmer and politician. He served as a Member of the Parliament of Finland, representing the National Progressive Party from 1922 to 1927 and the Agrarian League from 1930 to 1936.
