= Jaakko Vainio =

Finnish politician and journalist

Jaakko Vainio (14 February 1892, Kurkijoki - 6 June 1953; original surname Repo) was a Finnish journalist and politician. He was a member of the Parliament of Finland from 1922 to 1924, representing the Agrarian League.
