= Pekka Kemppi =

Pekka Kemppi (30 July 1887, Jaakkima – 10 May 1957) was a Finnish shop assistant, stevedore, lumberjack, journalist, playwright and politician. He served as a Member of the Parliament of Finland from 1922 to 1923, representing the Socialist Workers' Party of Finland (SSTP). He was imprisoned on sedition charges in 1923.
