= Jooseppi Kauranen =

Finnish politician

Juosep (Jooseppi) Kauranen (23 May 1880 – 8 November 1935) was a Finnish farmer and politician, born in Muolaa. He was a member of the Parliament of Finland from 1922 until his death in 1935, representing the Agrarian League.
