= Mikko Jaskari =

Finnish politician

Mikko Jaskari (5 January 1866, Nurmo - 10 October 1936) was a Finnish farmer, lay preacher and politician. He was a member of the Parliament of Finland, representing the Finnish Party from 1913 to 1916 and the National Coalition Party from 1920 to 1927.
