= Albin Koponen =

Finnish politician

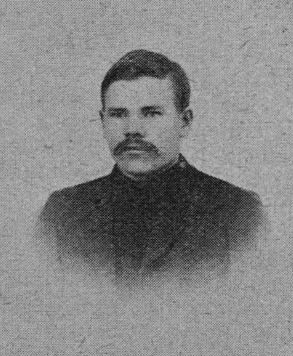

Albin Koponen (1 September 1881, Pielisjärvi – 10 November 1944) was a Finnish sheet metal worker and politician. He served as a Member of the Parliament of Finland from 1907 to 1918 and again from 1922 until his death in 1944, representing the Social Democratic Party of Finland (SDP). Koponen was imprisoned from 1918 to 1919 for having sided with the Reds during the Finnish Civil War.
