= Anna Haverinen =

Finnish politician (1884–1959)

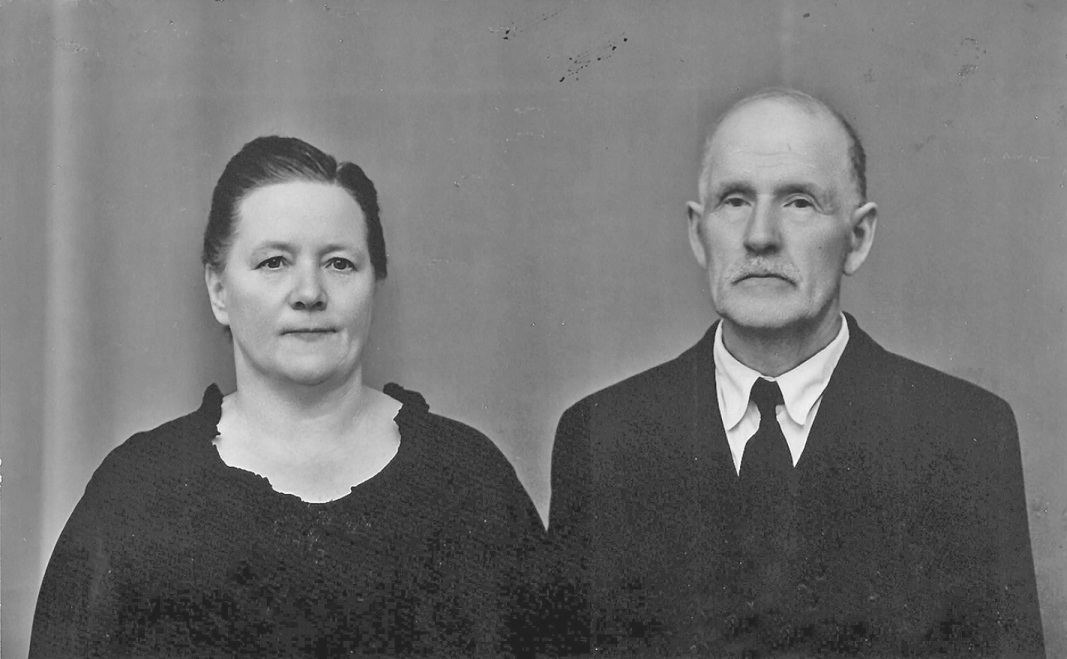
Anna and Juho Haverinen in 1940

Anna Haverinen (née Fonsell; 6 August 1884, Somero - 16 December 1959) was a Finnish office worker and politician. She was a member of the Parliament of Finland from 1922 to 1930, representing the Social Democratic Party of Finland (SDP).
