= List of members of the Parliament of Finland, 1919–1922 =

This is the list of the members of the Parliament of Finland between April 1, 1919 – September 4, 1922 following the parliamentary election in 1919. In the elections Social Democratic Party of Finland (Finnish: Suomen Sosialidemokraattinen Puolue) won 80 seats, Agrarian Party (Maalaisliitto, Agrarian League) 42, National Coalition Party (Kansallinen Kokoomus) 28, National Progressive Party (Kansallinen Edistyspuolue) 26, Swedish People's Party (Ruotsalainen kansanpuolue, Swedish: Svenska folkpartiet) 22 and Christian Workers' Union (Suomen kristillisen työväen liitto) 2.

Lauri Kristian Relander was selected as Speaker of the Parliament of Finland on April 2. He resigned after being appointed the governor of Viipuri Province on May 8, 1920. Kyösti Kallio was then the Speaker until March 29, 1921, when he was replaced by Wäinö Wuolijoki.

Five cabinets were formed during this parliament: 4 composed of parties from right and center, and one caretaker cabinet. Only the cabinet of Erich had the majority in the parliament.

Cabinets during the parliament
Prime minister	Start	End	Days	Parties
Kaarlo Castrén	April 4, 1919	August 15, 1919	121	National Progressive Party; Agrarian Party; Swedish People's Party
Juho Vennola	August 15, 1919	March 15, 1920	214	National Progressive Party; Agrarian Party
Rafael Erich	March 15, 1920	April 9, 1921	391	National Coalition Party; National Progressive Party; Agrarian Party; Swedish People's Party
Juho Vennola	April 9, 1921	June 2, 1922	420	National Progressive Party; Agrarian Party
Aimo Cajander	June 2, 1922	November 14, 1922	166	none (caretaker cabinet)

== Members of the Parliament 1919–1922 ==
In the table, the names written with italics were appointed to the Parliament later than April 1, 1919—the first day of the new Parliament—to replace those who had died or resigned.

English name	Finnish / Swedish name	Seats
Social Democratic Party	Suomen Sosialidemokraattinen Puolue, Finlands socialdemokratiska parti	80
Agrarian League	Maalaisliitto, Agrarförbundet	42
National Coalition Party	Kansallinen Kokoomus, Samlingspartiet	28
National Progressive Party	Kansallinen Edistyspuolue. Framstegspartiet	26
Swedish People's Party	Ruotsalainen kansanpuolue, Svenska folkpartiet	22 (Note: Georg Schauman and Georg von Wendt were nominated by Swedish People's Party, but did not join party's parliamentary group after the election and instead formed Swedish Left parliamentary group (Swedish: Svensk Vänster, Finnish: Ruotsalainen vasemmisto). Unlike the majority of Swedish People's Party, Swedish Left supported republican constitution.)
Christian Workers' Union	Suomen kristillisen työväen liitto, Finlands kristliga arbetarförbund	2

Name	Born	Sex	Parliamentary group	Constituency	Notes	Source
Aalto, Artturi	1876	M	Social Democratic Party	Uusimaa		
Aalto, Kalle	1884	M	Social Democratic Party	Turku South	(Note: Kalle Aalto replaced Sikstus Rönnberg on October 16, 1919)	
Ahlfors, Fanny	1884	F	Social Democratic Party	Turku North		
Ailio, Julius	1872	M	Social Democratic Party	Häme South		
Alanen, Ivar	1863	M	National Coalition Party	Turku North		
Alfthan, Alex	1865	M	National Coalition Party	Häme South	(Note: Alex Alfthan replaced Artturi Virkkunen on February 16, 1922)	
Alkio, Santeri	1862	M	Agrarian League	Vaasa South		
Ampuja, Mikko	1882	M	Social Democratic Party	Uusimaa		
Andersson, Otto	1881	M	Social Democratic Party	Vaasa North		
Arajärvi, Juhani	1867	M	National Coalition Party	Häme North		
Arhama, Kusti	1885	M	Agrarian League	Oulu South		
Arho, Antero	1870	M	Social Democratic Party	Oulu North		
Auer, Ilmari	1879	M	National Progressive Party	Uusimaa		
von Born, Ernst	1885	M	Swedish People's Party	Uusimaa		
Broända, Johan	1866	M	Swedish People's Party	Vaasa North		
Byman, Lennart	1875	M	Swedish People's Party	Uusimaa	(Note: Lennart Byman replaced Eirik Hornborg on May 2, 1922)	
Collan, Mikko	1881	M	National Progressive Party	Turku North	(Note: Mikko Collan resigned on October 8, 1920)	
Colliander, Rafael	1878	M	Swedish People's Party	Turku South		
Eklund, Artur	1880	M	Swedish People's Party	Vaasa North		
Elfving, Otto	1874	M	Social Democratic Party	Vaasa North		
Elovaara, Kustavi	1867	M	Agrarian League	Oulu South		
Erich, Mikko	1888	M	National Coalition Party	Viipuri East		
Erich, Rafael	1879	M	National Coalition Party	Mikkeli		
Estlander, Ernst	1870	M	Swedish People's Party	Vaasa South		
af Forselles, Arthur	1864	M	Swedish People's Party	Uusimaa		
Fränti, Aleksanteri	1881	M	National Progressive Party	Oulu South		
Furuhjelm, Annie	1859	F	Swedish People's Party	Uusimaa		
Furuhjelm, Ragnar	1879	M	Swedish People's Party	Uusimaa		
Gebhard, Hedvig	1867	F	National Coalition Party	Uusimaa		
Haapasalo, Anna	1882	F	Social Democratic Party	Viipuri East		
Hakala, Kalle Fredrik	1884	M	Social Democratic Party	Turku North		
Hakkila, Väinö	1882	M	Social Democratic Party	Uusimaa		
Hallsten, Ilmi	1862	F	National Coalition Party	Turku North		
Halme, Aatu	1873	M	Social Democratic Party	Uusimaa		
Hanhisalo, Frans	1893	M	Agrarian League	Vaasa North	(Note: Frans Hanhisalo resigned November 25, 1921)	
Hannula, Edvard	1859	M	National Coalition Party	Turku North		
Hannula, Mandi	1880	F	National Progressive Party	Mikkeli		
Hannunen, Hilda	1882	F	Social Democratic Party	Vaasa South	(Note: Hilda Hannunen replaced Iisakki Valavaara on October 8, 1920)	
Hatva, Eero	1872	M	Agrarian League	Kuopio West		
Heikinheimo, Oskari	1873	M	National Coalition Party	Vaasa East	(Note: Oskari Heikinheimo replaced Aleksanteri Koivisto on January 27, 1922)	
Heikkinen, Juho	1863	M	Agrarian League	Oulu South		
Heikkinen, Pekka	1883	M	Agrarian League	Kuopio West		
Heimonen, Taavetti	1870	M	National Progressive Party	Mikkeli	(Note: Taavetti Heimonen died on June 1, 1920)	
Heinonen, Kaarlo	1878	M	Social Democratic Party	Uusimaa		
Helenelund, Edvard	1885	M	Swedish People's Party	Vaasa South		
Helenius-Seppälä, Matti	1870	M	Christian Workers' Union	Turku South	(Note: Matti Helenius-Seppälä died October 18, 1920)	
Helle, Edvard	1879	M	Social Democratic Party	Uusimaa	(Note: Edvard Helle resigned on September 27, 1921)	
Helo, Johan	1889	M	Social Democratic Party	Turku South		
Hiidenheimo, Artturi	1877	M	National Coalition Party	Uusimaa		
Hiidenheimo, Elli	1883	F	National Coalition Party	Häme North		
Hildén, Leo	1876	M	Social Democratic Party	Uusimaa		
Hiltunen, Olli	1877	M	Social Democratic Party	Kuopio East		
Holma, Kaarlo	1883	M	National Coalition Party	Turku South		
Homén, Theodor	1858	M	National Coalition Party	Viipuri West		
Hornborg, Eirik	1879	M	Swedish People's Party	Uusimaa	(Note: Eirik Hornborg resigned on May 1, 1922)	
Hultin, Tekla	1864	F	National Coalition Party	Viipuri West		
Hupli, Väinö	1886	M	Social Democratic Party	Uusimaa		
Huttunen, Evert	1884	M	Social Democratic Party	Viipuri West		
Huttunen, Petter	1883	M	Social Democratic Party	Kuopio West		
Hämäläinen, August	1874	M	National Progressive Party	Häme South		
Hästbacka, Emil	1872	M	Swedish People's Party	Vaasa North		
Ihamuotila, Janne	1868	M	Agrarian League	Häme North		
Itkonen, Rieti	1889	M	Social Democratic Party	Viipuri West		
Jaskari, Mikko	1866	M	National Coalition Party	Vaasa North		
Joukahainen, Vilkku	1879	M	Agrarian League	Viipuri West	(Note: Vilkku Joukahainen replaced Wilhelmi Malmivaara on March 18, 1920)	
Junes, Antti	1874	M	Agrarian League	Oulu North		
Juustila, Väinö	1884	M	National Coalition Party	Oulu South		
Juutilainen, Antti	1882	M	Agrarian League	Viipuri West		
Jyske, Jalmari	1884	M	National Progressive Party	Kuopio East	(Note: Jalmari Jyske resigned January 27, 1922)	
Kaila, Erkki	1867	M	National Coalition Party	Uusimaa		
Kallio, Kyösti	1873	M	Agrarian League	Oulu South		
Kananen, Juho	1874	M	Social Democratic Party	Mikkeli		
Kaskinen, Juho	1865	M	National Progressive Party	Turku South		
Kauppinen, Aarne	1889	M	Social Democratic Party	Mikkeli		
Kekki, Matti	1868	M	National Progressive Party	Viipuri East		
Kekkonen, Juho	1890	M	Christian Workers' Union	Turku North		
Keto, Jaakko	1884	M	Social Democratic Party	Häme South		
Kivimäki, Toivo	1886	M	National Progressive Party	Turku South	(Note: Toivo Kivimäki replaced Heikki Ritavuori on February 22, 1922)	
Koivisto, Aleksanteri	1863	M	National Coalition Party	Vaasa East	(Note: Aleksanteri Koivisto died on December 22, 1921)	
Koivulahti-Lehto, Hilma	1881	F	Social Democratic Party	Vaasa East		
Koivuranta, Janne	1885	M	Agrarian League	Oulu North		
Kojonen, Rope	1874	M	National Progressive Party	Häme South		
Kokko, Juho	1865	M	Agrarian League	Viipuri East		
Kontu, Arvi	1883	M	National Progressive Party	Turku South		
Korhonen, Vilho	1867	M	Social Democratic Party	Turku North		
Korhonen, Ville	1877	M	Social Democratic Party	Kuopio West		
Koskenkaiku, Artturi	1871	M	Social Democratic Party	Vaasa East		
Koskinen, August	1878	M	Social Democratic Party	Vaasa East		
Kotonen, Anton	1876	M	Social Democratic Party	Viipuri East		
Kujala, Jaakko	1882	M	Social Democratic Party	Vaasa South		
Kukkonen, Antti	1889	M	Agrarian League	Viipuri East		
Kärki, Frans	1884	M	Agrarian League	Vaasa South		
Kääriäinen, Heikki	1872	M	Social Democratic Party	Kuopio West		
Lahdensuo, Jalo	1882	M	Agrarian League	Vaasa North	(Note: Jalo Lahdensuo replaced Frans Hanhisalo on December 7, 1921)	
Laherma, Jonas	1888	M	Social Democratic Party	Oulu North		
Laine, Augusta	1867	F	National Progressive Party	Kuopio East	(Note: Augusta Laine replaced Jalmari Jyske on February 10, 1922)	
Lanne, Kaarlo	1860	M	National Coalition Party	Vaasa South		
Lassila, Matti	1865	M	Social Democratic Party	Vaasa East	(Note: Matti Lassila replaced Penna Paunu on October 12, 1920)	
Latvala, Matti	1868	M	Agrarian League	Vaasa East		
Laukkonen, Matti	1883	M	Social Democratic Party	Oulu South		
Laurén, Karl	1879	M	Swedish People's Party	Turku South		
Lehikoinen, Antti	1886	M	Social Democratic Party	Kuopio East		
Lehtinen, Mooses	1878	M	Social Democratic Party	Turku South		
Lehtokoski, Aino	1886	F	Social Democratic Party	Turku South		
Lehtola, Väinö	1883	M	Social Democratic Party	Häme North		
Lehtonen, Väinö	1883	M	Social Democratic Party	Turku South		
Leino, Emil	1874	M	Social Democratic Party	Uusimaa		
Leinonen, Olga	1877	F	Social Democratic Party	Häme South		
Leivo, Oskari	1876	M	Social Democratic Party	Turku North	(Note: Oskari Leivo died on December 12, 1921)	
Leppälä, Bertta	1891	F	Agrarian League	Viipuri East		
Leppälä, Juhani	1880	M	Agrarian League	Viipuri East		
Leskinen, August	1876	M	Social Democratic Party	Viipuri West		
Liakka, Niilo	1864	M	Agrarian League	Oulu North		
Lindroos, Alfred	1883	M	Social Democratic Party	Uusimaa	(Note: Alfred Lindroos replaced Edvard Helle on September 30, 1921)	
Linna, Eemil	1876	M	National Progressive Party	Häme North		
Linna, Jalmari	1891	M	Social Democratic Party	Vaasa East		
Lohi, Kalle	1872	M	Agrarian League	Oulu North		
Loppi, Jaakko	1874	M	Agrarian League	Viipuri East		
Loukko, Jaakko	1870	M	Agrarian League	Vaasa North		
Lumio, Kalle	1872	M	Social Democratic Party	Häme North	(Note: Kalle Lumio replaced Väinö Vankkoja on October 17, 1919)	
Luopajärvi, Mikko	1871	M	Agrarian League	Vaasa South	(Note: Mikko Luopajärvi died on January 5, 1920)	
Luukkonen, Gabriel	1880	M	Social Democratic Party	Mikkeli		
Lyytinen, Edla	1874	F	Social Democratic Party	Viipuri East	(Note: Edla Lyytinen died on May 21, 1919)	
Malmi, Jalmari	1893	M	Agrarian League	Viipuri West	(Note: Jalmari Malmi replaced Artur Wuorimaa on October 11, 1921)	
Malmivaara, Wilhelmi	1854	M	National Coalition Party	Vaasa North	(Note: Wilhelmi Malmivaara resigned on March 11, 1920)	
Manner, Albin	1888	M	Agrarian League	Viipuri East		
Mannonen, Matti	1871	M	National Coalition Party	Viipuri West		
Mantere, Oskari	1874	M	National Progressive Party	Häme South		
Meriläinen, Antti	1887	M	Social Democratic Party	Oulu South		
Mero, Aleksanteri	1884	M	Agrarian League	Viipuri East	(Note: Aleksanteri Mero replaced Lauri Kristian Relander on October 26, 1920)	
Mickelsson, Eliel	1886	M	Social Democratic Party	Turku South		
Miemois, Johannes	1866	M	Swedish People's Party	Vaasa North		
Nevanlinna, Ernst	1873	M	National Coalition Party	Turku South		
Niemi, Vilho	1881	M	Social Democratic Party	Oulu South		
Nikkanen, Ville	1885	M	National Coalition Party	Viipuri West		
Niskanen, Henrik	1873	M	Agrarian League	Mikkeli		
Nissinen, Tatu	1883	M	National Progressive Party	Kuopio West	(Note: Tatu Nissinen replaced Bruno Sarlin on October 15, 1920)	
Niukkanen, Juho	1888	M	Agrarian League	Viipuri East		
Nix, Oskar	1872	M	Swedish People's Party	Vaasa South		
Nyberg, Johannes	1862	M	National Coalition Party	Turku South		
Nyrkkö, Antero	1889	M	Social Democratic Party	Viipuri West		
Nättinen, Nestori	1857	M	Social Democratic Party	Häme North	(Note: Nestori Nättinen replaced Niilo Patinen on February 28, 1922)	
Oja, Matti	1865	M	Agrarian League	Oulu South		
Paasivuori, Matti	1866	M	Social Democratic Party	Viipuri West		
Palmgren, Axel	1867	M	Swedish People's Party	Uusimaa		
Patinen, Niilo	1886	M	Social Democratic Party	Häme North	(Note: NiiloPatinen resigned February 14, 1922)	
Paunu, Penna	1868	M	Social Democratic Party	Vaasa East	(Note: Penna Paunu died on August 24, 1920)	
Pehkonen, Mikko	1879	M	Social Democratic Party	Kuopio East		
Perälä, Lauri	1881	M	Agrarian League	Vaasa East		
Pesonen, Aarno	1886	M	Agrarian League	Oulu South		
Pesonen, Yrjö	1888	M	Agrarian League	Oulu South		
Peura, Heikki	1882	M	Agrarian League	Vaasa South	(Note: Heikki Peura replaced Mikko Luopajärvi on February 13, 1920)	
Piitulainen, Mikko	1878	M	Agrarian League	Viipuri East		
Pilkka, Simson	1880	M	Agrarian League	Viipuri West		
Pitkänen, Ari	1876	M	Agrarian League	Kuopio East		
Procopé, Hjalmar	1889	M	Swedish People's Party	Uusimaa		
Puittinen, Matti	1883	M	Social Democratic Party	Kuopio East		
Puro, Olavi	1883	M	Social Democratic Party	Häme South		
Pöyhönen, Taavi	1882	M	Social Democratic Party	Mikkeli		
Raatikainen, August	1874	M	Agrarian League	Kuopio West		
Raearo, Emil	1882	M	Social Democratic Party	Vaasa East		
Ramsay, August	1859	M	Swedish People's Party	Uusimaa		
Rantanen, Eelis	1879	M	Christian Workers' Union	Turku South	(Note: Eelis Rantanen replaced Matti Helenius-Seppälä on March 31, 1921)	
Rapo, Jussi	1878	M	Social Democratic Party	Viipuri East		
Reinikainen, Oskari	1885	M	Social Democratic Party	Viipuri West		
Relander, Lauri Kristian	1883	M	Agrarian League	Viipuri East	(Note: Lauri Relander resigned on October 8, 1920)	
Rintala, Toivo	1876	M	Social Democratic Party	Turku North		
Ritavuori, Heikki	1880	M	National Progressive Party	Turku South	(Note: Heikki Ritavuori was assassinated on February 14, 1922)	
Roos, Wilhelm	1858	M	Swedish People's Party	Turku South		
Roslander, Wivi	1891	F	Social Democratic Party	Turku North	(Note: Wivi Roslander replaced Oskari Leivo on January 24, 1922)	
Ruuskanen, Kustaa	1881	M	National Progressive Party	Mikkeli		
Ryti, Risto	1889	M	National Progressive Party	Turku North		
Rytkönen, Anni	1891	F	Social Democratic Party	Kuopio West		
Ryynänen, Juho	1873	M	Agrarian League	Kuopio East		
Ryömä, Hannes	1878	M	Social Democratic Party	Häme North		
Rönnberg, Sikstus	1861	M	Social Democratic Party	Turku South	(Note: Sikstus Rönnberg died on August 30, 1919)	
Saarelainen, Pekka	1868	M	Agrarian League	Kuopio East		
Saarikivi, Lyydi	1880	F	Social Democratic Party	Kuopio West		
Sarlin, Bruno	1878	M	National Progressive Party	Kuopio West		
Schauman, Georg	1870	M	Swedish Left	Uusimaa		
Selander, Wäinö	1886	M	Agrarian League	Turku North		
Setälä, E. N.	1864	M	National Coalition Party	Turku North		
Sihvo, Aarne	1889	M	National Progressive Party	Viipuri East	(Note: Aarne Sihvo resigned on October 4, 1920)	
Sillanpää, Miina	1866	F	Social Democratic Party	Turku North		
Sinkko, Elias	1871	M	National Progressive Party	Viipuri West		
Sirola, Leander	1871	M	Social Democratic Party	Uusimaa		
Snellman, Juho	1866	M	National Coalition Party	Kuopio West		
Soininen, Mikael	1860	M	National Progressive Party	Mikkeli		
Suolahti, Hugo	1874	M	National Coalition Party	Häme South		
Särkkä, Wille	1877	M	National Progressive Party	Viipuri West		
Takkula, Eetu	1884	M	Agrarian League	Oulu North		
Tanner, Väinö	1881	M	Social Democratic Party	Turku North		
Taskinen, Heikki	1888	M	Agrarian League	Kuopio East		
Taskinen, Vili	1874	M	National Progressive Party	Mikkeli	(Note: Vili Taskinen replaced Taavetti Heimonen on October 4, 1920)	
Thuneberg, Paul	1865	M	National Progressive Party	Viipuri West		
Toivari, Anna	1874	F	Social Democratic Party	Kuopio East	(Note: Anna Toivari replaced Toivo Turtiainen on October 12, 1920)	
Toiviainen, Juhana	1879	M	National Progressive Party	Viipuri East	(Note: Juhana Toiviainen replaced Aarne Sihvo on October 12, 1920)	
Tolonen, Jussi	1882	M	Social Democratic Party	Mikkeli		
Tonteri, Pekka	1880	M	Social Democratic Party	Viipuri East	(Note: Pekka Tonteri replaced Edla Lyytinen on June 3, 1919)	
Torppa, Juho	1859	M	National Progressive Party	Vaasa North		
Turtiainen, Toivo	1883	M	Social Democratic Party	Kuopio East	(Note: Toivo Turtiainen died on September 12, 1920)	
Typpö, Leonard	1868	M	National Coalition Party	Oulu South		
Törmä, Heikki	1875	M	Social Democratic Party	Oulu South		
Vainio, Ville	1882	M	Social Democratic Party; Socialist Workers' Party	Kuopio West		
Valavaara, Iisakki	1871	M	Social Democratic Party	Vaasa South	(Note: Iisakki Valavaara resigned on October 8, 1920)	
Valjakka, Hilma	1881	F	Social Democratic Party	Mikkeli		
Valkonen, Matti	1880	M	National Progressive Party	Viipuri East		
Vankkoja, Väinö	1880	M	Social Democratic Party	Häme North	(Note: Väinö Vankkoja died on August 10, 1919)	
Vennola, Juho	1872	M	National Progressive Party	Uusimaa		
Vesterinen, Vihtori	1885	M	Agrarian League	Vaasa East		
Viljanen, Emil	1874	M	Social Democratic Party	Häme North		
Vilkemaa, Hilja	1887	F	National Progressive Party	Turku North	(Note: Hilja Vilkevaara replaced Mikko Collan on October 9, 1920)	
Virkkunen, Artturi H.	1864	M	National Coalition Party	Häme South	(Note: Artturi Wirkkunen resigned on February 7, 1922)	
Virkkunen, Paavo	1874	M	National Coalition Party	Vaasa South		
Virtanen, Juho	1870	M	Social Democratic Party	Häme South		
Virtanen, Nikolai	1884	M	Social Democratic Party	Häme North		
Voionmaa, Väinö	1869	M	Social Democratic Party	Kuopio West		
Vuokoski, Kaarlo	1880	M	National Progressive Party	Mikkeli		
Väre, Oskari	1884	M	Social Democratic Party	Häme South		
von Wendt, Georg	1876	M	Swedish Left	Vaasa South		
Wuolijoki, Wäinö	1872	M	Social Democratic Party	Häme North		
Wuorimaa, Artur	1854	M	Agrarian League	Viipuri West	(Note: Artur Wuorimaa resigned on September 23, 1921)	
Åkerblom, Kristian	1877	M	Swedish People's Party	Vaasa South		
Österholm, John	1882	M	Swedish People's Party	Uusimaa		
