= Taskinen =

Taskinen is a Finnish surname. Notable people with the surname include:

- Antti Taskinen (born 1976) Finnish double-murderer
- Heikki Taskinen (1888–1952), Finnish farmer and politician
- Heikki Taskinen (athlete) (1905–1988), Finnish athlete
- Heimo Taskinen (born 1947); Finnish ski-orienteering competitor
- Markku Taskinen (born 1952), Finnish athlete
- Vili Taskinen (1874–1930), Finnish farmer and politician
- Vitali Taskinen (born 1986) Finnish ice hockey goaltender
