= Karjalainen II cabinet =

Government of Finland from 1970 to 1971

Karjalainen II Cabinet
- 53rd Cabinet of Finland
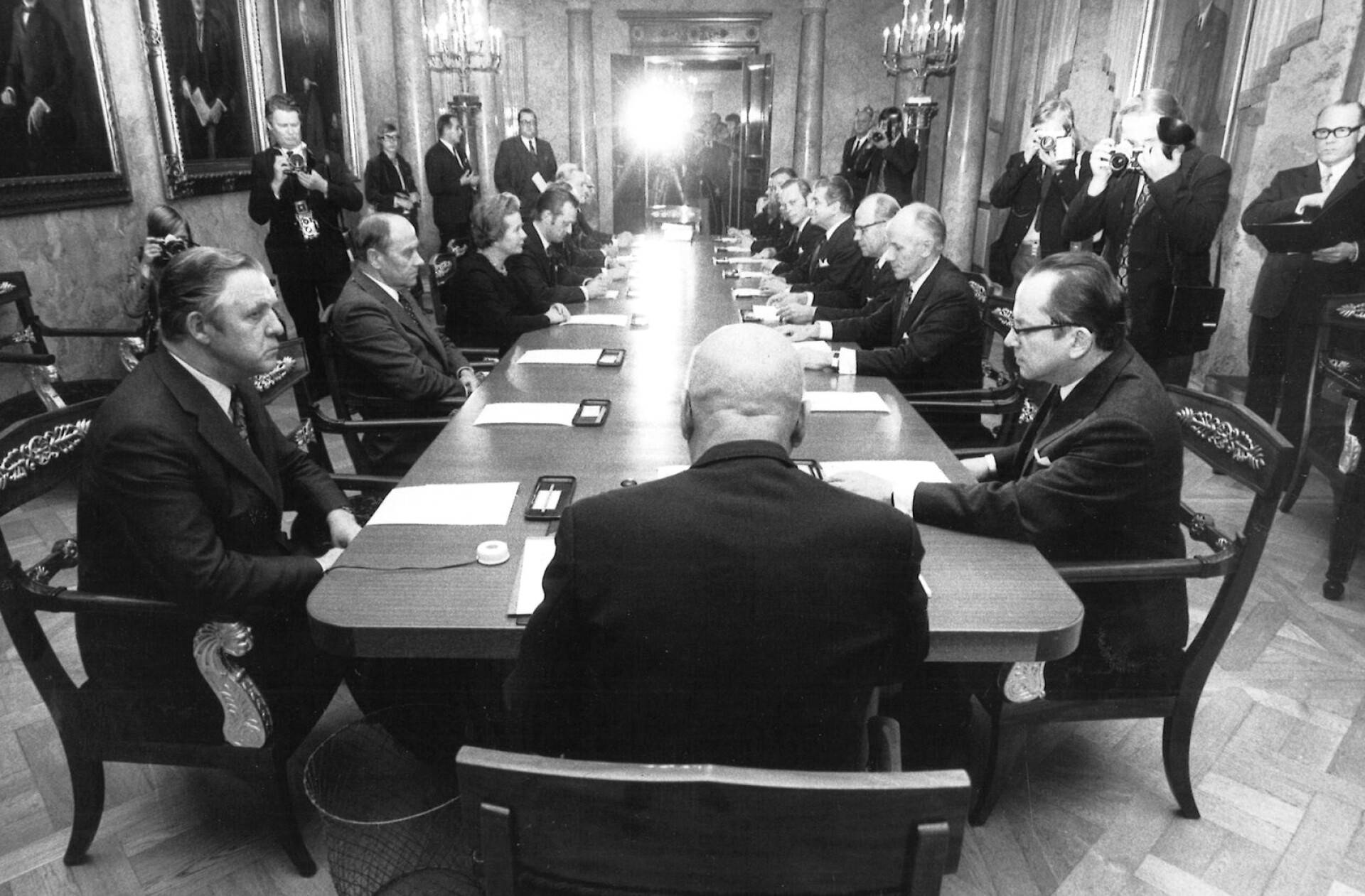
- Date formed: 15 July 1970
- Date dissolved: 29 October 1971

People and organisations
- President: Urho Kekkonen
- Prime Minister: Ahti Karjalainen
- Member parties: Centre Party; SDP; SKDL; Liberal People's Party; RKP
- Status in legislature: Majority coalition

History
- Election: 1970 parliamentary election
- Predecessor: Aura I
- Successor: Aura II

Ahti Karjalainen's second cabinet was the 53rd government of Finland. The cabinet existed from 15 July 1970 to 29 October 1971. It was a majority coalition government formed by the Social Democratic Party of Finland, the Agrarian League, the Finnish People's Democratic League, the Liberals, and the Swedish People's Party of Finland.

== Ministers ==
| Minister | Period of office | Party |
|---|---|---|
| Prime Minister; Ahti Karjalainen | 15 July 1970 – 29 October 1971 | Centre Party |
| Deputy Prime Minister; Veikko Helle | 15 July 1970 – 29 October 1971 | Social Democratic Party |
| Minister at Council of State; Olavi J. Mattila | 15 July 1970 – 29 October 1971 | Independent |
| Minister of Foreign Affairs; Väinö Leskinen | 15 July 1970 – 29 October 1971 | Social Democratic Party |
| Deputy Minister of Foreign Affairs; Olavi J. Mattila | 15 July 1970 – 29 October 1971 | Independent |
| Minister of Justice; Erkki Tuominen; Mikko Laaksonen; Jacob Söderman | 15 July 1970 – 26 March 1971; 26 March 1971 – 30 September 1971; 1 October 1971 – 29 October 1971 | People's Democratic League; Social Democratic Party; Social Democratic Party |
| Minister of the Interior; Artturi Jämsén; Eino Uusitalo | 15 July 1970 – 28 May 1971; 28 May 1971 – 29 October 1971 | Centre Party Centre Party |
| Deputy Minister of the Interior; Mikko Laaksonen; Jacob Söderman | 26 March 1971 – 30 September 1971; 1 October 1971 – 29 October 1971 | Social Democratic Party Social Democratic Party |
| Minister of Defence; Kristian Gestrin | 15 July 1970 – 29 October 1971 | Swedish People's Party |
| Minister of Finance; Carl Olof Tallgren | 15 July 1970 – 29 October 1971 | Swedish People's Party |
| Deputy Minister of Finance; Valto Käkelä | 15 July 1970 – 29 October 1971 | Social Democratic Party |
| Minister of Education; Jaakko Itälä | 15 July 1970 – 29 October 1971 | Liberal People's Party |
| Deputy Minister of Education; Meeri Kalavainen | 15 July 1970 – 29 October 1971 | Social Democratic Party |
| Minister of Agriculture; Nestori Kaasalainen | 15 July 1970 – 29 October 1971 | Centre Party |
| Deputy Minister of Agriculture; Lars Lindeman | 15 July 1970 – 29 October 1971 | Social Democratic Party |
| Minister of Transport; Veikko Saarto; Kalervo Haapasalo | 15 July 1970 – 26 March 1971; 26 March 1971 – 29 October 1971 | People's Democratic League; Social Democratic Party |
| Deputy Minister of Trade and Industry; Kalervo Haapasalo; Olavi Salonen; Olavi J. Mattila | 15 July 1970 – 26 March 1971; 26 March 1971 – 29 October 1971; 16 September 1970 – 29 October 1971 | Social Democratic Party; Social Democratic Party; Independent |
| Minister of Trade and Industry; Arne Berner | 15 July 1970 – 29 October 1971 | Liberal People's Party |
| Minister of Social Affairs; Anna-Liisa Tiekso; Pekka Kuusi | 15 July 1970 – 26 March 1971; 26 March 1971 – 29 October 1971 | People's Democratic League; Social Democratic Party |
| Deputy Minister of Social Affairs; Katri-Helena Eskelinen; Arne Berner | 15 July 1970 – 29 October 1971; 22 July 1970 – 29 October 1971 | Centre Party; Liberal People's Party |

| Preceded by Aura I Cabinet | Cabinet of Finland; 15 July 1970 – 29 October 1971 | Succeeded by Aura II Cabinet |
