= Kagal (Finnish resistance movement) =

Anti-Russian resistance movement (1899–1905)

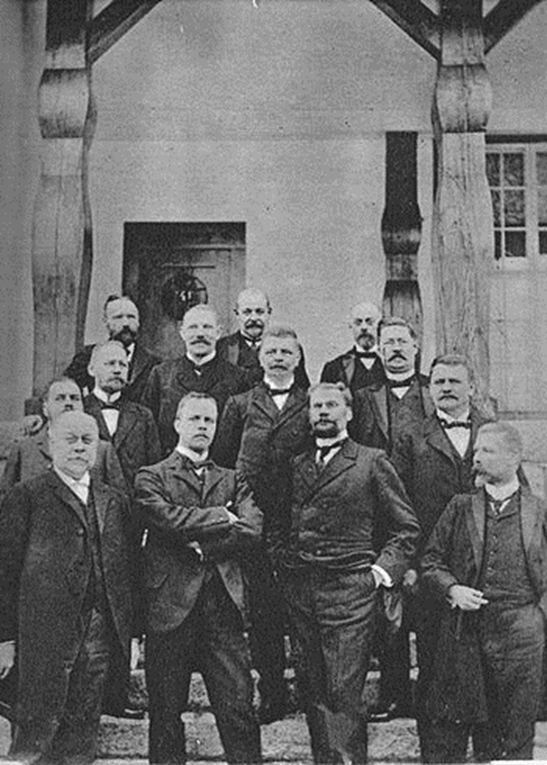
Kagal members at the Träskända estate in Espoo on 10 April 1903. In the back, P. E. Svinhufvud in front of the door and Eero Erkko second from the right; in front, Ernst Estlander with his hands in the gust and Theodor Homén's hands in his pockets.

In the history of Finland, the Kagal was a resistance movement that existed before the 1905 Russian Revolution and founded under the period of Russian oppression, in resistance to the oppressive government of Governor-General Nikolai Bobrikov which actively conducted Russification of Finland. The name (Finnish: Kagaali) comes via Russian (hence the -g- for an original -h-) from qahal (Hebrew for 'congregation, assembly'). The word was a mocking name used by Russian conservative newspapers as a means of ridicule when referring to the anti-government activity in Finland. In the original meaning, Kagal/Kahal referred to a central body for the Jewish congregations of Russia.

The Kagal was founded in 1901. The central character of the Kagal is thought to have been Leo Mechelin, an independent liberal, but notable lead characters also included Carl Mannerheim (older brother of Marshal of Finland Carl Gustaf Emil Mannerheim), Adolf von Bonsdorff, Ernst Estlander, J. N. Reuter, Adolf Törngren and Wilhelm Zilliacus from the Swedish People's Party, and the Young Finns Eero Erkko, Theodor Homén, Heikki Renvall and P. E. Svinhufvud.

The Kagal was founded in the Turholma mansion in Laajasalo. The lord of the mansion, General Julius af Lindfors, had inherited his fortune from his father-in-law Henrik Borgström (1799–1883), who had risen from nothing to owning a house of commerce, and had been present in founding the Liberal Party and acted as a notable patron of the arts.

In a secret meeting, Leo Mechelin wrote a people's address to the Tsar, which gathered 500,000 signatures (the country's population at the time was about 2.6 million). The signatures probably also included Svinhufvud, Erkko and Zilliacus, among others. The Tsar rejected the address and threatened conscientious objectors with loss of study places and offices, but conscription strikes organised by the Kagal had the effect that virtually no one arrived at the army enlistment, and finally the Tsar gave up implementing a mandatory draft.

Later, the Tsar granted Bobrikov full rights as a dictator and expelled the lead characters of the Kagal from the country (1903). The Kagal continued to act from within Stockholm and other places. Most of the members stood by Mechelin's idea of non-violent resistance, but a minority wing led by writer Konni Zilliacus founded an Active Resistance Party, whose activists murdered oppression leaders, smuggled guns, and despite their centrist politics, made alliances with the Russian socialist revolutionists. Professor Mechelin co-operated with the Russian liberals (Cadet Party).

In 1905, Russia suffered a humiliating military defeat by Japan, which caused social unrest, and finally the Tsar gave up dictatorship in favour of the parliament (Dom). The Finnish Constitutionalists continued their resistance with the support of the socialists, and the Tsar let Mechelin found a government (senate) and bring general and equal voting and election rights and human rights to Finland (1906). This was the end of the first oppression period (1899–1905).

The Women's Kagal was a sister organisation of the Kagal. Among its leaders was the Young Finn academic, Dr. Tekla Hultin, who also supported activist and Jaeger movements. The Women's Kagal distributed forbidden political literature, such as the underground newspaper Fria Ord.

== Literature ==
- Reuter, Julio Nathaniel (1928), "Kagalen" : ett bidrag till Finlands historia 1899-1905. 1 / J. N. Reuter., Skrifter utgivna av Svenska litteratursällskapet i Finland (in Swedish), Helsinki: Society of Swedish Literature in Finland, ISSN 0039-6842, Wikidata Q113518999
- Reuter, Julio Nathaniel (1930), "Kagalen" : ett bidrag till Finlands historia 1899-1905. 2 / J. N. Reuter.: ett bidrag till Finlands historia 1899-1905, Skrifter utgivna av Svenska litteratursällskapet i Finland (in Swedish), Helsinki: Society of Swedish Literature in Finland, ISSN 0039-6842, Wikidata Q113519016

== See also ==
- Finnish nationalism
- Russification of Finland
