= Ville Korhonen =

Ville Korhonen may refer to:

- Ville Korhonen (ice hockey)
- Ville Korhonen (politician)
