= Tossavainen =

Tossavainen is a Finnish surname. Notable people with the surname include:

- Antti Tossavainen (1886–1962), Finnish salesperson and politician
- Ilmari Tossavainen (1887–1978), Finnish politician
- Reijo Tossavainen (born 1948), Finnish politician
