= Tuomainen =

Surname list

Tuomainen is a surname. Notable people with the surname include:

- Johanna Tuomainen, Finnish chess master
- Marko Tuomainen (born 1972), Finnish ice hockey player
- Miikka Tuomainen (born 1986), Finnish ice hockey player
- Raimo Tuomainen (born 1957), Finnish health sociologist
