= Kananen =

Kananen is a Finnish surname. Notable people with the surname include:

- Juho Kananen (1874–1955), Finnish smallholder and politician
- Jussi Kananen, Finnish politician
- Kimmo Kananen (born 1980), Finnish racing cyclist
