= Ruuskanen =

Ruuskanen is a Finnish surname. Notable people with the surname include:

- Kustaa Ruuskanen (1881–1971), Finnish farmer and politician
- Antti Ruuskanen (born 1984), Finnish track and field athlete
- Juha-Matti Ruuskanen (born 1984), Finnish ski jumper
