= Tonteri =

Surname list

Tonteri is a Finnish surname. Notable people with the surname include:

- Pekka Tonteri (1880–1953), Finnish politician
- Roope Tonteri (born 1992), Finnish snowboarder
- Kristina Tonteri-Young (born 1998), Finnish actress and balletdancer
