= Rintala =

Rintala is a Finnish surname. Notable people with the surname include:

- Toivo Rintala (1876–1953), Finnish consumers' co-operative manager and politician
- Paavo Rintala (1930–1999), Finnish novelist and theologian
- Rudy Rintala (1909–1999), American four-sport collegiate athlete and hall-of-famer at Stanford University
- Sami Rintala (born 1969), Finnish architect and artist
- Teemu Rintala, Finnish sport shooter
