= Saarelainen =

Saarelainen is a Finnish surname. Notable people with the surname include:

- Ilmari Saarelainen (born 1944), Finnish actor
- Pekka Saarelainen (1868 – 1933), Finnish farmer and politician
- Pekka Saarelainen (born 1967), Finnish curler
- Sari Saarelainen (born 1981), Finnish racing cyclist
- Timo Saarelainen (born 1960), retired Finnish basketball player
