= Byman =

Byman is a surname. Notable people with the surname include:

- Bob Byman (born 1955), American golfer
- Daniel Byman (born 1967), American political scientist
- Isabelle Yalkovsky Byman (1906–1981), American pianist and music educator
- Lennart Byman (1875–1947), Finnish Lutheran clergyman and politician
- Reijo Byman (born 1955), Finnish hurdler
