= Zitting =

Zitting is a surname. Notable people with the surname include:

- Charles Zitting (1894–1954), American Mormon fundamentalist leader
- Olli Zitting (1872–1929), Finnish farmer and politician

== See also ==
- Zetting, in France
- Zitting cisticola, warbler
