= Meeri Kalavainen =

Finnish politician (1918–2010)

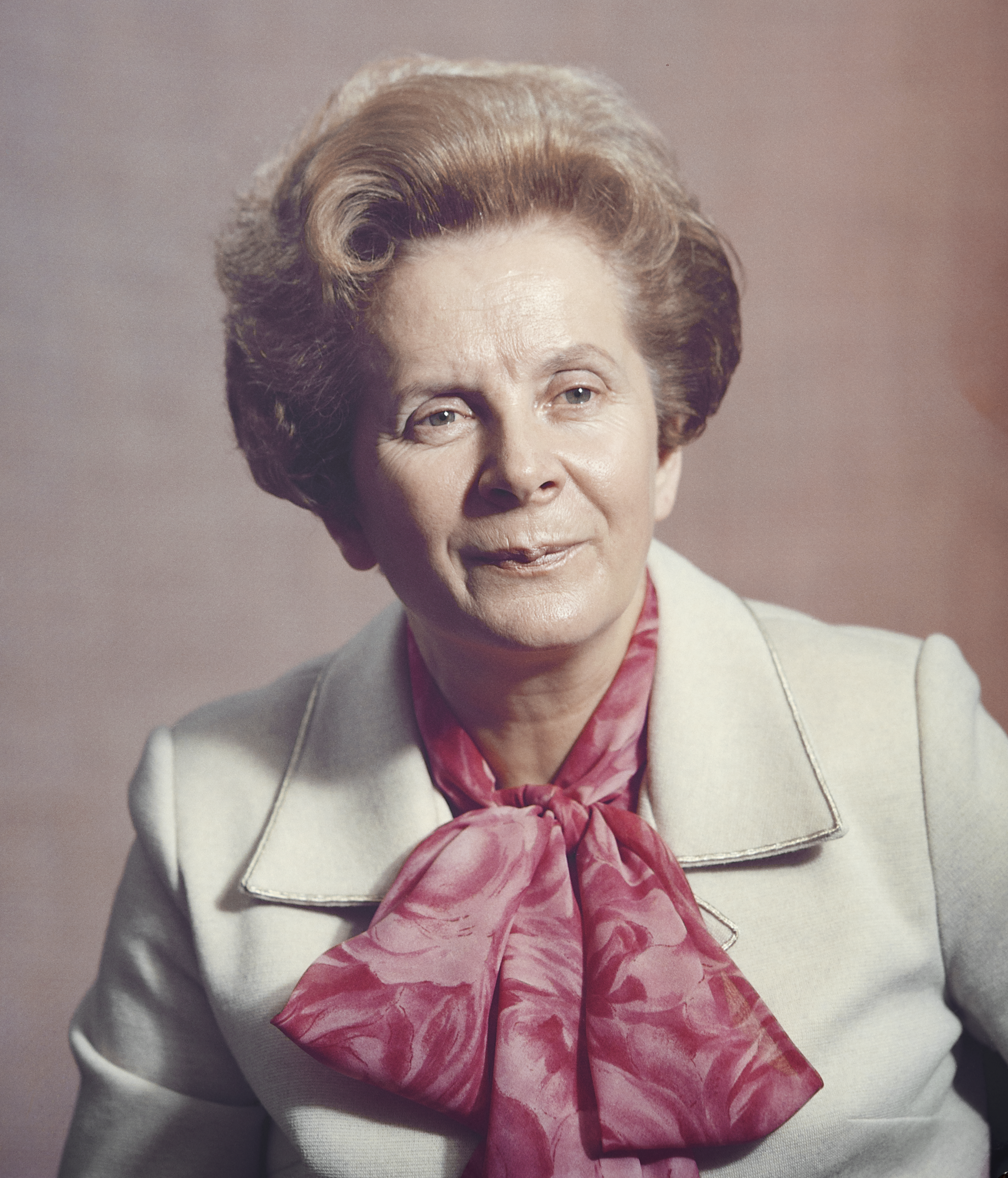
- Kalavainen in 1971

Minister of Culture
- In office 15 July 1970 – 29 October 1971

Member of the Finnish Parliament
- In office 22 July 1948 – 23 March 1979
- Constituency: Kymi

Personal details
- Born: 27 April 1918; Dubrovka, Vsevolozhsky District, Leningrad Oblast, Russian Soviet Republic
- Died: 27 October 2010 (aged 92); Helsinki, Finland

Meeri Sirka Kalavainen (27 April 1918 – 27 October 2010) was a Finnish politician. She represented Kymi in the Parliament of Finland as a member of the Social Democratic Party from 1948 to 1979. She was also the country's first minister of culture in the cabinet of prime minister Ahti Karjalainen from 1970 to 1971.

== Biography ==
Kalavainen was born in Dubrovka, Vsevolozhsky District, Leningrad Oblast in Soviet Russia, on 27 April 1918. She grew up in Kotka, where she graduated from a vocational school in 1935. She was involved in politics from a young age, becoming the chair of the youth arm of the Kotka Social Democratic Party (SDP) when she was 17 years old. During World War II, Kalavainen was a bank teller at a workers' savings bank in Kymenlaakso from 1938 to 1945, after which she moved to Helsinki to work as an organizational secretary for the SDP's youth association. From 1947 to 1948, she was a secretary at a union affiliate of the Finnish Federation of Trade Unions.

In 1948, Kalavainen was elected to the Parliament of Finland to represent the constituency of Kymi as a member of the SDP. She was re-elected eight times, serving continuously until 1979. Kalavainen frequently worked on educational and cultural issues and policies. She was a member of many parliamentary committees, including Education and Culture, Finance, Foreign Affairs, and the Grand Committee, and was a vice chair of the SDP parliamentary caucus from 1967 to 1979. She was also a presidential elector in the 1950, 1956, 1962, and 1968 elections.

Prime minister Ahti Karjalainen appointed Kalavainen as minister of culture and second minister of education in his second cabinet in 1970. She was the country's first minister of culture, and held the position until October 1971. As minister, she promoted adult education in Finland, and worked to provide government funding for youth organizations and arts groups. Kalavainen was also active in women's organizations. She chaired the Federation of Social Democratic Women, a role in which she helped unite various divided factions of the women's branch of the party. In 1972, she became the first president of the Council for Gender Equality, where she worked on issues of equal pay and access to child care.

Kalavainen died on 27 October 2010 in Helsinki, at the age of 92.

== See also ==
- List of Finnish MPs
