= Erkki Tuominen =

Finnish politician (1914–1975)

Minister of Justice
- In office 1970–1971
- Prime Minister: Ahti Karjalainen

Personal details
- Born: 1914
- Died: 1975 (aged 60–61)
- Party: Communist Party of Finland

Erkki Tuominen (1914–1975) was a Finnish politician. He was a member of the Communist Party and served as the minister of justice briefly between 1970 and 1971.

== Biography ==
Tuominen was born in 1914. He was a member of the Communist Party. Shortly after World War II he served in the state police. He was elected as a member of the political bureau of the Communist Party's central committee in April 1963. Tuominen was the minister of justice between 1970 and 1971 in the cabinet led by Ahti Karjalainen. Tuominen died in 1975.
