= Osmo Vepsäläinen =

Finnish politician (1931–2017)

- Born: 4 September 1931
- Died: 8 November 2017 (aged 86)

Osmo Vilho Vepsäläinen (4 September 1931 – 8 November 2017) was a Finnish civil servant and politician. He was a member of the Parliament of Finland from 1975 to 1979 and again from 1983 to 1987, representing the Finnish People's Democratic League (SKDL). was born in Nilsiä on 4 September 1931 and died in Varkaus on 8 November 2017, at the age of 86.
