= Kalle Kustaa Pykälä =

Finnish farmer and politician (1864–1915)

Karl Gustaf (Kalle Kustaa, K. K.) Pykälä (9 December 1864 – 2 October 1915) was a Finnish farmer and politician, born in Nastola. He was a member of the Parliament of Finland from 1907 until his death in 1915, representing the Agrarian League. He was murdered on 2 October 1915 as revenge for having witnessed in court against a man who had committed perjury. Kalle Kustaa Pykälä was the father of Bertta Leppälä and the father-in-law of Juhani Leppälä, who both were elected Members of Parliament for the Agrarian League.
