= Northeast Savo =

Administrative subdivision of North Savo, Finland

Northeast Savo Koillis-Savon seutukunta
- Sub-region
- Country: Finland
- Region: North Savo

Population (2021)
  - Total: 6,711
- Time zone: UTC+2 (EET)
  - Summer (DST): UTC+3 (EEST)

Northeast Savo or North Eastern Savonia (Finnish: Koillis-Savon seutukunta) is a sub-region of Finland. It is an administrative subdivision of the region of North Savo.

The region of Northeast Savo was named a region of sudden structural change during 2008 to 2010, after Stromsdal, a major employer in the region, went bankrupt.

== Municipalities ==
Northeastern Savo in 2000

Coat of arms	Municipality
Kaavin vaakuna	Kaavi (municipality)
Rautavaaran vaakuna	Rautavaara (municipality)
Tuusniemen vaakuna	Tuusniemi (municipality)

Northeastern Savo previously comprised five municipalities: Juankoski, Kaavi, Nilsiä, Rautavaara, and Tuusniemi.

On 1 January 2013, Nilsiä was incorporated into the city of Kuopio, a part of the Kuopio sub-region, and was thus removed from Northeastern Savo.

On 1 January 2017, Juankoski was incorporated into the city of Kuopio. With the removal of Juankoski from the Northeastern Savo sub-region, the land connection between Rautavaara and the rest of the sub-region was broken.

The sub-region currently comprises the municipalities of Kaavi, Rautavaara, and Tuusniemi.

== Population ==
The sub-region had a population of 19,837 in 2011. In December 2021, the population was 6,711.

Population development of the Northeast Savo sub-region 1980 – 2015
Year	Population
1980	12,401
1985	11,536
1990	10,787
2000	9,357
2005	8,684
2010	8,113
2015	7,650
