= 1919 Finnish parliamentary election =

General election

- 1–3 March 1919

All 200 seats in the Parliament of Finland 101 seats needed for a majority
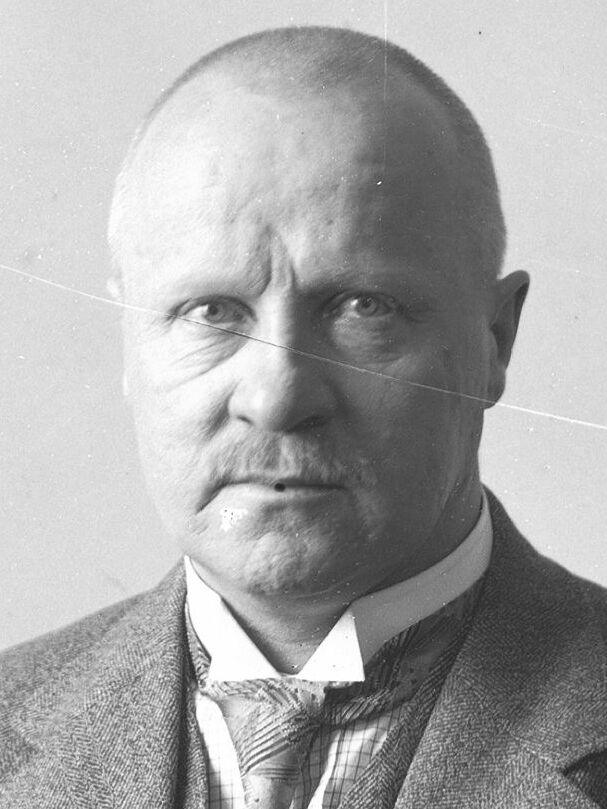

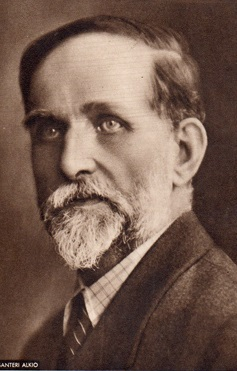

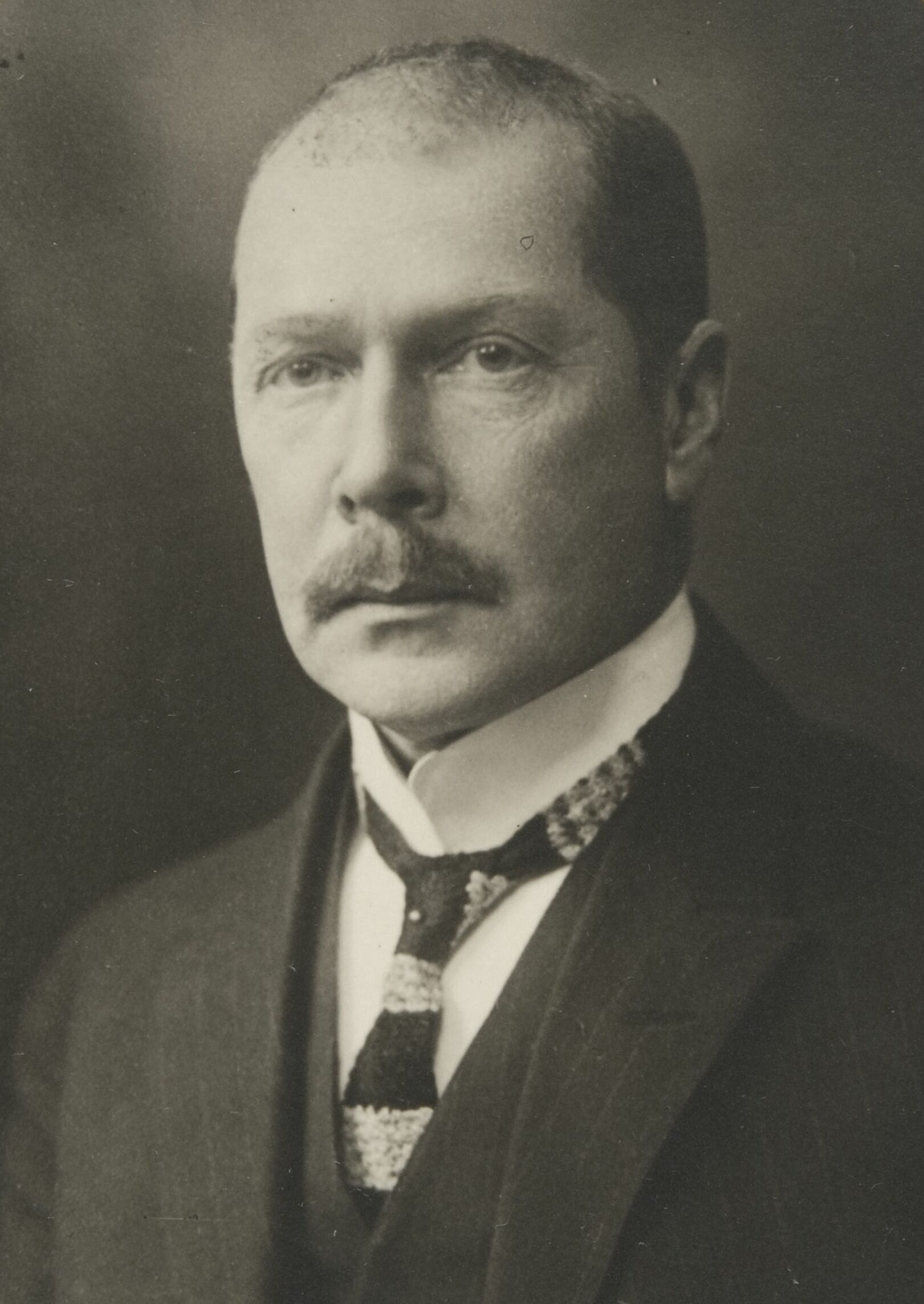

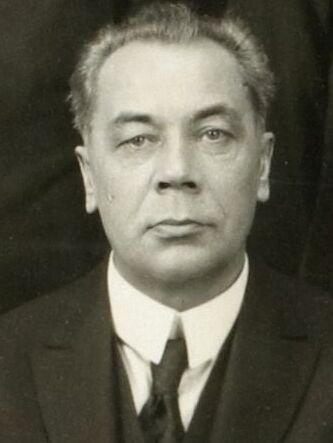
| | First party | Second party | Third party |
|---|---|---|---|
| Leader | Väinö Tanner | Santeri Alkio | Hugo Suolahti |
| Party | SDP | Agrarian | National Coalition |
| Last election | 44.79%, 92 seats | 12.38%, 26 seats | – |
| Seats won | 80 | 42 | 26 |
| Seat change | ▼12 | ▲16 | New |
| Popular vote | 365,046 | 189,297 | 151,018 |
| Percentage | 37.98% | 19.70% | 15.71% |
| Swing | ▼6.81pp | ▲7.32pp | New |
| | Fourth party | Fifth party |
| Leader | Oskari Mantere | Eric von Rettig |
| Party | National Progressive | RKP |
| Last election | – | 10.90%, 21 seats |
| Seats won | 26 | 22 |
| Seat change | new | ▲1 |
| Popular vote | 123,090 | 116,582 |
| Percentage | 12.81% | 12.13% |
| Swing | new | ▲1.23pp |
Prime Minister before election
Lauri Ingman
National Coalition
Prime Minister after election
Kaarlo Castrén
National Progressive

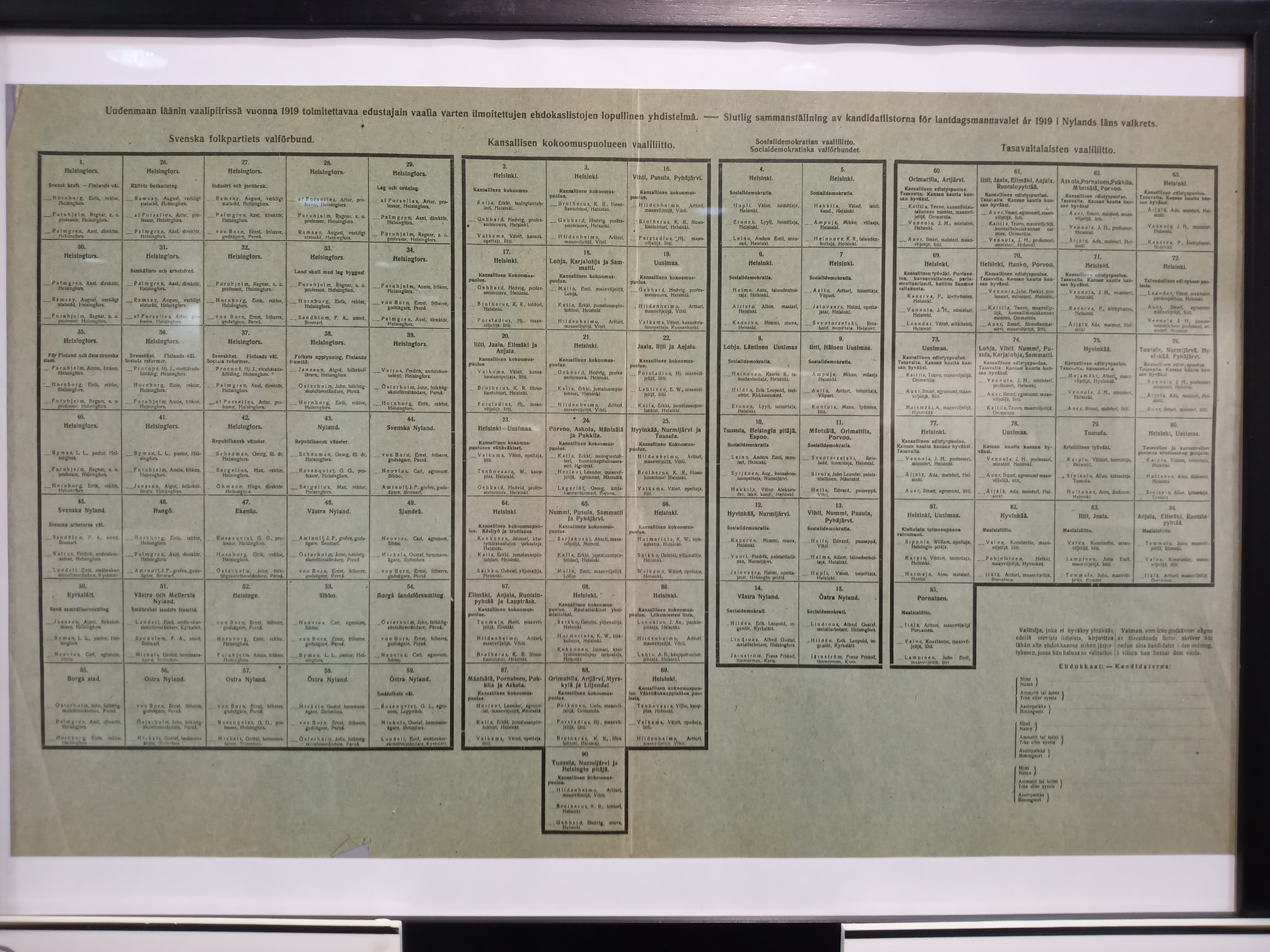
Ballot paper

Parliamentary elections were held in Finland between 1 and 3 March 1919. It marked the first parliamentary election in a newly independent Finland.

The Social Democratic Party emerged as the largest in Parliament with 80 of the 200 seats. Voter turnout was 67%.

== Background ==
In 1919, Finland was still reeling from the violent and traumatic effects of its Civil War. Many Whites (rightists and centrists) felt that a strong national government was necessary to prevent a new civil war. Some conservatives, especially monarchists, even wondered if Finland should keep its democracy and universal right to vote. For example, Carl Gustaf Emil Mannerheim, in the White Army's victory parade in Helsinki in May 1918, called for giving the leadership of Finland's to a strong leader, free from partisan wrangling.

Liberals, such as the first President Kaarlo Juho Ståhlberg, believed that discontent with Finland's political, social and economic order would be removed by making reforms. Monarchists had elected the German Prince Frederick Charles of Hesse as the Finnish king in October 1918, but he had renounced the throne in December 1918, conscious of the problems that Finland would have in its relations with the winners World War I if it had a citizen of the defeated Germany as its king. The republican parties (the Social Democrats, Agrarians and Progressives) disagreed on how much power the president should have. The monarchist parties (the National Coalition Party and the Swedish People's Party of Finland) wanted a strong presidency if there was going to be a republic at all.

In the end, enough Finnish voters sided with the republican parties, which also promised significant social reforms, such as the freeing of tenant farmers and the distribution of excess farmland to them.

== Results ==
| Party | Votes | % | Seats | +/– |
|---|---|---|---|---|
| Social Democratic Party | 365,046 | 37.98 | 80 | –12 |
| Agrarian League | 189,297 | 19.70 | 42 | +16 |
| National Coalition Party | 151,018 | 15.71 | 28 | New |
| National Progressive Party | 123,090 | 12.81 | 26 | New |
| Swedish People's Party | 116,582 | 12.13 | 22 | +1 |
| Christian Workers' Union | 14,718 | 1.53 | 2 | +2 |
| Others | 1,350 | 0.14 | 0 | – |
| Total | 961,101 | 100.00 | 200 | 0 |
| Valid votes | 961,101 | 99.51 | | |
| Invalid/blank votes | 4,771 | 0.49 | | |
| Total votes | 965,872 | 100.00 | | |
| Registered voters/turnout | 1,438,709 | 67.13 | | |
Source: Nohlen & Stöver

== Aftermath ==
On 25 July 1919 Ståhlberg defeated Mannerheim in the presidential elections.

== See also ==
- List of members of the Parliament of Finland, 1919–1922
