= International Entente of Radical and Similar Democratic Parties =

Political international (1924–1938)

- Countries with member or associate parties
- Formation: 1924; 102 years ago
- Dissolved: 1938; 88 years ago
- Type: Political international
- Purpose: Radicalism
- Headquarters: Rue de Valois, Paris
- President: Ferdinand Buisson; Ivar Berendsen
- Secretary-General: Émile Borel
- Main organ: L'Entente

The International Entente of Radical and Similar Democratic Parties (French: Entente Internationale des Partis Radicaux et des Partis Démocratiques Similaires), also known as the Radical International, was a political international of radical and left-leaning liberal political parties existed from 1924 until 1938.

== History ==
Establishment followed pattern of similar organizations such as Labour and Socialist International, adapted for various centrist parties. First constituent meeting of the International Entente of Radical and Similar Democratic Parties were organized on 29 August 1924 in Geneva under leadership of later Nobel Peace Prize awardee Ferdinand Buisson, who later acted as the President of the executive committee.

After 1938, the organization ceased operating, but some of the member parties, later in 1947, founded the broader organization Liberal International.

== Organization ==
=== Structure ===
Objective of the organization were to connect various political parties associated with liberalism and classical radicalism to promote essential democracy. Its intellectual operation were closely associated with the League of Nations. Organization were directed by the executive committee, consisting of delegates of some of the member parties. Organizational seat were located at headquarters of the French Radical Party at Volois Palace, Rue de Valois, Paris.

After foundation of the International Entente, it included member or associate parties of Belgium, Bulgaria, Czechoslovakia, Finland, France, Denmark, Germany, Greece, Lithuania, Luxembourg, the Netherlands, New Zealand, Norway, Poland, Romania, Sweden, Switzerland, Turkey, and the United Kingdom.

== Congresses ==
- 1928: London, United Kingdom
- 1934: Copenhagen, Denmark
- 1935: London, United Kingdom

== Member and associate parties ==
Country	Party
Belgium	Radical and Radical-Socialist Party
Bulgaria	Radical Democratic Party
Czechoslovakia	Czechoslovak National Socialist Party
Denmark	Radikale Venstre
Finland	Liberal Swedish Party
France	Republican, Radical and Radical-Socialist Party
Germany	German Democratic Party
Greece	Agricultural and Labour Party
Lithuania	Lithuanian Popular Peasants' Union
Luxembourg	Radical Liberal Party
Netherlands	Free-thinking Democratic League
New Zealand	United Party
Norway	Venstre
Poland	Polish People's Party "Wyzwolenie"
Romania	National Peasants' Party
Sweden	Free-minded National Association
Switzerland	Free Democratic Party of Switzerland
Turkey	Republican People's Party
United Kingdom	Liberal Party

== See also ==
- Liberal International
- Communist International
- International Agrarian Bureau
- International Secretariat of Democratic Parties of Christian Inspiration
- International Working Union of Socialist Parties
- Labour and Socialist International
