= Anni Savolainen-Tapaninen =

Finnish politician (1875–1952)

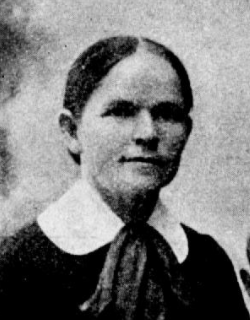
Anni Savolainen

Anna (Anni) Henriikka Savolainen-Tapaninen (née Savolainen; 29 January 1875 in Nilsiä – 5 December 1952) was a Finnish seamstress, smallholder and politician. She was a member of the Parliament of Finland from 1908 to 1918 and again from 1924 to 1927, representing the Social Democratic Party of Finland (SDP). She was imprisoned from 1918 to 1921 for having sided with the Reds during the Finnish Civil War.
