= Max Sergelius =

Finnish engineer and politician (1879–1958)

Maximilian (Max) Sergelius (5 May 1879 – 20 January 1958; former surname Sergejeff) was a Finnish engineer and politician, born in Turku. He was a member of the Parliament of Finland from 1926 to 1939 and from 1945 to 1948, representing the Swedish Left, which changed its name to Liberal Swedish Party in 1947. He was a presidential elector in the 1937, 1940 and 1943 presidential elections.
