= Nilsiä =

- Former municipality
- Nilsiän kaupunki Nilsiä stad
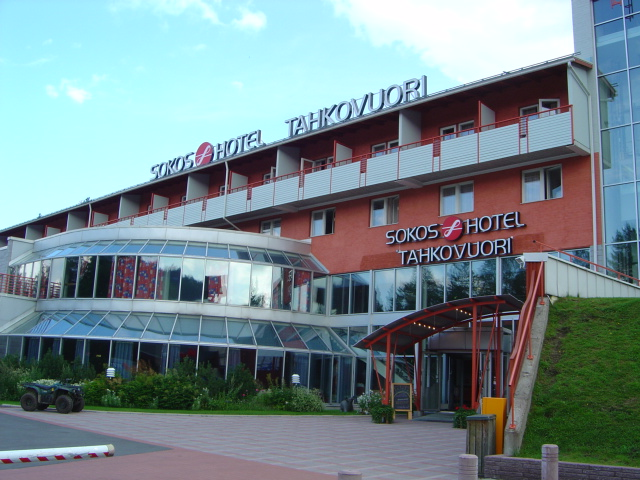
- Sokos Hotel Tahkovuori in Nilsiä

- Coat of arms

- Location of Nilsiä in Finland
- Coordinates: 63°12.3′N 028°05′E
- Country: Finland
- Region: North Savo
- Sub-region: Northeast Savo
- Charter: 1869
- Town privileges: 1998
- Consolidated: 2013

Area
  - Total: 847.71 km^{2} (327.30 sq mi)
  - Land: 711.57 km^{2} (274.74 sq mi)
  - Water: 136.14 km^{2} (52.56 sq mi)

Population (31 December 2012)
  - Total: 6,528
  - Density: 9.174/km^{2} (23.76/sq mi)
- Time zone: UTC+2 (EET)
  - Summer (DST): UTC+3 (EEST)
- Website: www.nilsia.fi

Nilsiä is a former small town and a municipality of Finland. It joined the city of Kuopio at the beginning of year 2013.

It is located in the North Savo region. The town has a population of 6,528 (31 December 2012) and covers an area of 847.71 square kilometres (327.30 sq mi) of which 136.14 km^{2} (52.56 sq mi) is water. The population density is 9.1741/km^{2} (23.7608/sq mi).

The municipality is unilingually Finnish.

The last few decades have been a period of rapid progress for the town, especially its tourism. There are still plenty of traditional rural occupations, but also many kinds of commercial activities. Nilsiä has become the administrative and commercial centre of Northeast Savo and it co-operates actively with the city of Kuopio. The services in Nilsiä are as diverse as in many larger towns.

Nilsiä offers sports and nature activities year-round, including a marina, a golf centre, and the Tahkovuori winter sport centre. There are marked routes for snowmobile trainers as well as hiking and mountain biking paths. The lakes Syväri and Vuotjärvi, and the Lastukoski rapids, all offer fishing.

Villages of Nilsiä

Ahmapuro, Eitikansalo, Hakkarala, Haluna, Hipanlahti, Kaaraslahti, Keyritty, Konttimäki, Lastukoski, Lukkarilansaari, Mikkajärvi, Murtolahti, Niinimäki, Nilsiä, Onkivesi, Pajujärvi, Pajulahti, Palonurmi, Pieksä,(Pieksänkoski), Raatti, Reittiö, Ruokonen (Ruokoiskylä), Siikajärvi, Sydänmaa, Syvärilä, Sänkimäki, Vuotjärvi.

== People born in Nilsiä ==
- Olli Zitting (1872 – 1929)
- Aatu Halme (1873 – 1933)
- Aaro Salo (1874 – 1949)
- Anni Savolainen-Tapaninen (1875 – 1952)
- Emil Rautaharju (1875 – 1947)
- Ville Korhonen (1877 – 1931)
- Pekka Heikkinen (1883 – 1959)
- Taavetti Lukkarinen (1884 – 1916)
- Antti Tossavainen (1886 – 1962)
- Heikki Taskinen (1888 – 1952)
- Ville Kyrönen (1891 – 1959)
- Pauli Pitkänen (1911 – 1941)
- Osmo Vepsäläinen (1931 – )
- Raimo Tuomainen (1957 – )
