= Emil Rautaharju =

Finnish politician

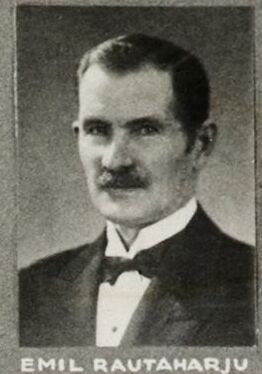
Image of Emil Rautaharju

Emil Fredrik Rautaharju (1 September 1875 - 11 February 1947; original surname Zitting) was a Finnish farmer and politician. He was a member of the Parliament of Finland from 1930 to 1933, representing the National Coalition Party. Rautaharju was born in Nilsiä; Olli Zitting was his elder brother.
