= Aaro Salo =

Finnish politician

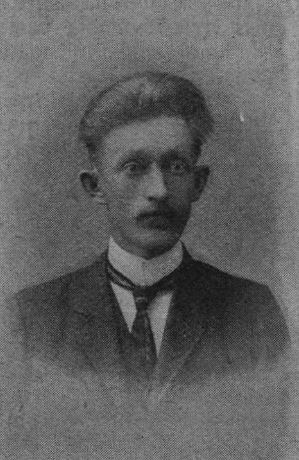
Image of Aaro Salo

Aron (Aaro) Salo (10 February 1874, Nilsiä - 22 October 1949; original surname Hiltunen) was a Finnish house painter and politician. He was a member of the Parliament of Finland from 1907 to 1913 and again from 1917 to 1918, representing the Social Democratic Party of Finland (SDP). He was imprisoned in 1918 for having sided with the Reds during the Finnish Civil War.
