= Kalervo Haapasalo =

Finnish journalist and politician (1912–2002)

Kalervo Felix (K. F., Feliks) Haapasalo (19 June 1912 – 9 July 2002) was a Finnish journalist and politician, born in Sortavala. He was a member of the Parliament of Finland from 1951 to 1975, representing the Social Democratic Party of Finland (SDP). He served as Deputy Minister of Trade and Industry from 15 July 1970 to 26 March 1971 and as Transport Minister from 26 March to 29 October 1971. He was a presidential elector in the 1950, 1956, 1962 and 1968 presidential elections. He was the son of Anna Haapasalo.
