= Taavi Pöyhönen =

Finnish politician (1882–1961)

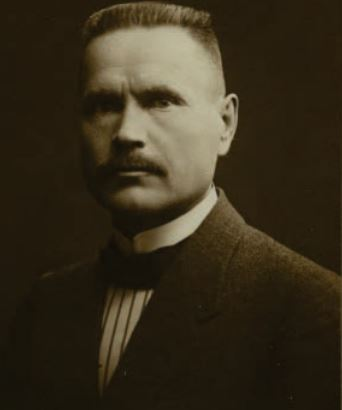

Taavetti (Taavi) Pöyhönen (27 January 1882, in Suonenjoki – 5 July 1961) was a Finnish schoolteacher and politician. He was a member of the Parliament of Finland from 1919 to 1922, representing the Social Democratic Party of Finland (SDP).
