= Jalmari Jyske =

Finnish politician (1884–1944)

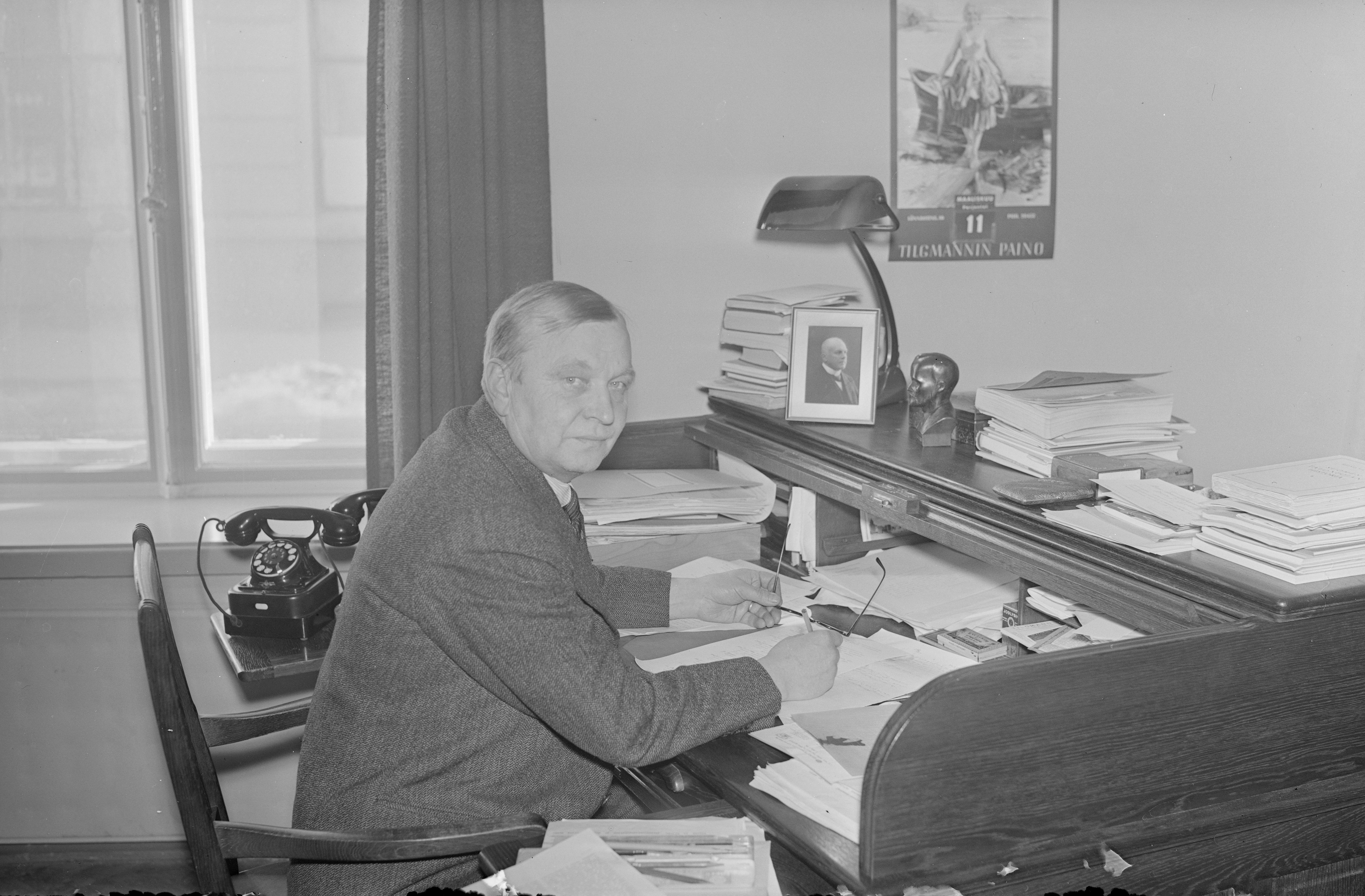
Jalmari Jyske (1938)

Kustaa Jalmari Jyske (9 October 1884 – 19 August 1944; surname until 1906 Friman) was a Finnish politician, born in Rauma. He was a member of the Parliament of Finland from 1919 to 1922, from 1924 to 1927 and from 1930 to 1933, representing the National Progressive Party. He was a presidential elector in the 1931 Finnish presidential election.
