= Matti Valkonen =

Finnish politician

Matti Valkonen (5 August 1880 – 10 October 1952) was a Finnish schoolteacher, farmer and politician. He was a Member of the Parliament of Finland from 1919 to 1922, representing the National Progressive Party.
