= Aleksanteri Fränti =

Finnish schoolteacher, farmer and politician (1881–1950)

Aleksanteri Fränti (4 May 1881 – 11 May 1950; original surname Hippi) was a Finnish schoolteacher, farmer and politician, born in Lapua. He was a member of the Parliament of Finland from 1909 to 1913, from 1916 to 1917, from 1919 to 1922 and from 1933 to 1936. He belonged to the Young Finnish Party until December 1918 and to the National Progressive Party after that. He was a presidential elector in the 1931, 1937, 1940 and 1943 presidential elections.
