= Juho Snellman =

Finnish farmer and politician (1866–1926)

Johan (Juho) Snellman (31 August 1866 – 27 January 1926) was a Finnish farmer and politician, born in Karttula. He was a member of the Diet of Finland from 1904 to 1905 and from 1905 to 1906 and of the Parliament of Finland from 1907 to 1913 and from 1917 to 1922, representing the Young Finnish Party until 9 December 1918 and the National Coalition Party after that.
