= Henrik Niskanen =

Finnish politician

Henrik Niskanen (13 July 1873 – 4 January 1951) was a Finnish farmer, real estate agent and politician, born in Pielavesi. He served as a Member of the Parliament of Finland from 1919 to 1924, representing the Agrarian League.
