= Eetu Takkula =

Finnish farmer and politician (1884–1953)

Juho Edvard (Eetu) Takkula (29 March 1884 – 2 April 1953) was a Finnish farmer and politician, born in Kuusamo. He was a member of the Parliament of Finland from 1917 to 1922, representing the Agrarian League (ML).
