= Heikki Kääriäinen =

Finnish smallholder and politician (1872–1947)

Heikki Kääriäinen (14 January 1872 – 26 October 1947) was a Finnish smallholder and politician, born in Iisalmen maalaiskunta. He was a member of the Parliament of Finland from 1910 to 1916, from 1919 to 1922 and from 1933 to 1945, representing the Social Democratic Party of Finland (SDP). He was a presidential elector in the 1931 Finnish presidential election.
