= Matti Laukkonen =

Finnish politician

Matti Laukkonen (30 August 1883, Karstula – 20 May 1946) was a Finnish house painter, journalist and politician. He was a Member of the Parliament of Finland from 1919 to 1922, representing the Social Democratic Party of Finland (SDP).
