= Kustavi Elovaara =

Finnish farmer and politician (1867–1935)

Erik Gustaf (Kustavi) Elovaara (1 December 1867 – 31 May 1935; original surname Eriksson) was a Finnish farmer and politician, born in Alatornio. He was a member of the Diet of Finland in 1899 and 1900 and of the Parliament of Finland from 1919 to 1922. He belonged to the Agrarian League.
