= Eelis Rantanen =

Finnish politician

Eelis Konstantin Rantanen (5 March 1879, Turku – 26 June 1946) was a Finnish schoolteacher and politician. He was a member of the Parliament of Finland from 1921 to 1922, representing the Christian Workers' Union of Finland (SKrTL).
