= Jussi Tolonen =

Finnish politician (1882 - 1962)

Jussi Tolonen (11 June 1882, Karttula – 11 March 1962) was a Finnish smallholder and politician. He served as a Member of the Parliament of Finland from 1913 to 1917, from 1919 to 1924 and from 1927 to 1951, representing the Social Democratic Party of Finland (SDP).
