= Juhani Leppälä =

Finnish schoolteacher, farmer and politician (1880–1976)

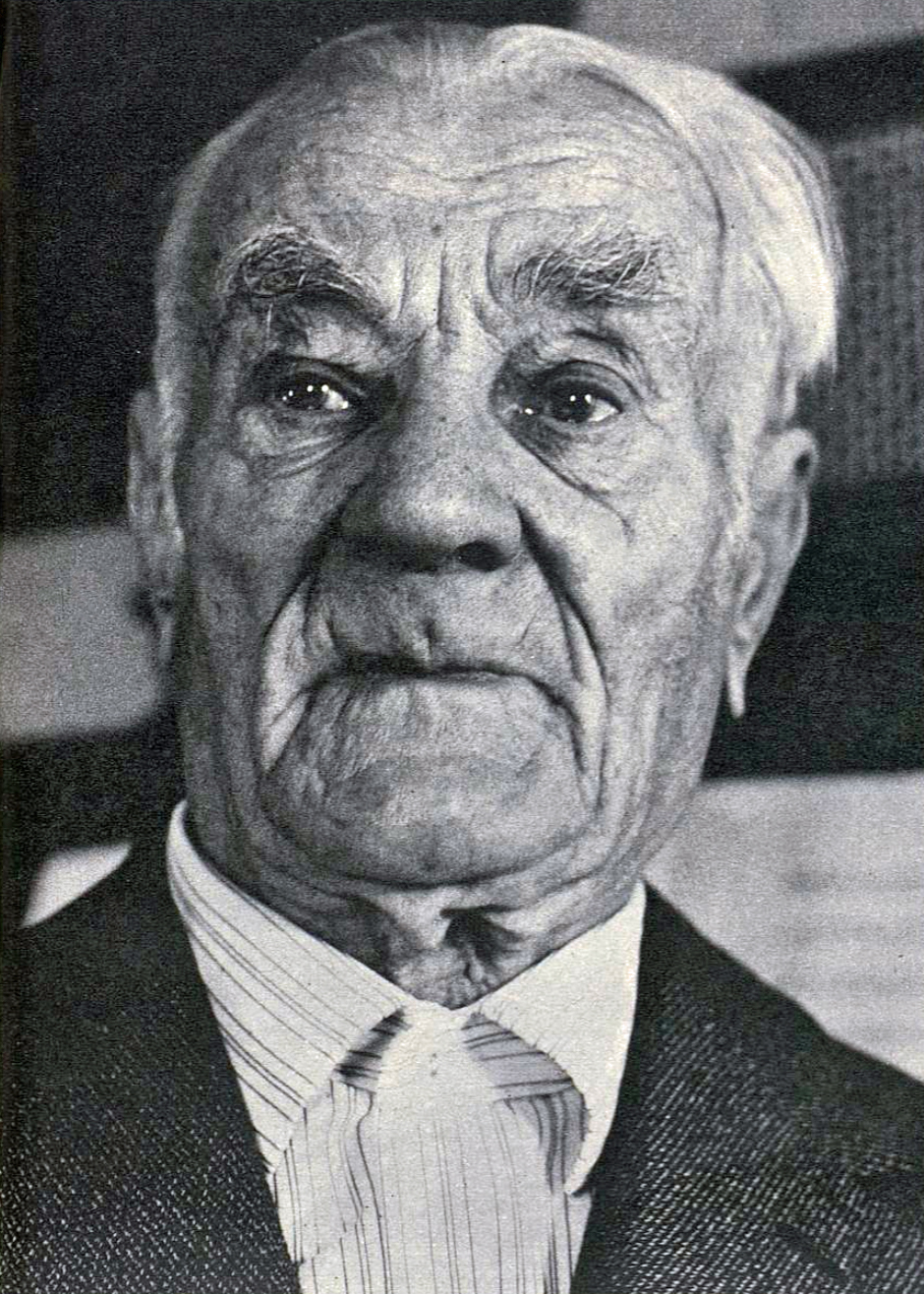
Juhani Leppälä

Johan (Juhani) Fredrik Leppälä (10 May 1880 – 15 December 1976; surname until 1906 Lindeqvist) was a Finnish schoolteacher, farmer and politician. Born in Nummi, he was a member of the Parliament of Finland from 1907 to 1908, from 1919 to 1922 and from 1927 to 1951, representing the Agrarian League. He served as Minister without portfolio from 16 to 27 August 1929 and as Deputy Minister of Social Affairs from 27 August 1929 to 4 July 1930. He was a presidential elector in the 1925 Finnish presidential election In 1919, Juhani Leppälä married fellow Member of Parliament Bertta Leppälä, who was the daughter of Kalle Kustaa Pykälä.
