= Nestori Nättinen =

Finnish carpenter and politician (1857–1932)

Nestor (Nestori) Nättinen (24 September 1857 – 16 March 1932) was a Finnish carpenter and politician, born in Korpilahti. He was a member of the Parliament of Finland from February to September 1922, representing the Social Democratic Party of Finland (SDP).
