= Olli Zitting =

Finnish politician

Olli Pekka Zitting (13 March 1872 - 6 May 1929) was a Finnish farmer and politician. He was a member of the Parliament of Finland from 1926 to 1927, representing the National Coalition Party. Zitting was born in Nilsiä; Emil Rautaharju was his younger brother.
