= Matti Oja =

Finnish farmer and politician (1865–1934)

Matti Oja (20 May 1865 – 16 March 1934) was a Finnish farmer and politician, born in Nivala. He was a member of the Parliament of Finland from 1919 to 1922, representing the Agrarian League.
