= Paul Thuneberg =

Finnish physician, farmer and politician (1865–1923)

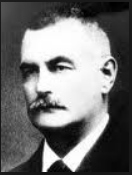
Paul Thuneberg

Paul Alexander Thuneberg (22 September 1865 – 11 January 1923) was a Finnish physician, farmer and politician, born in Viipuri. He was a member of the Parliament of Finland from 1919 to 1922, representing the National Progressive Party.
