= Liberal Swedish Party =

- Abbreviation: SV, RV (1919–1947); SFP, RVP (1947–1951)
- Founded: 1919
- Dissolved: 1951
- Ideology: Liberalism; Swedish minority interests Republicanism
- Political position: Centre-left
- International affiliation: International Entente of Radical and Similar Democratic Parties

The Liberal Swedish Party (Swedish: Svenska frisinnade partiet, Finnish: Ruotsalainen vapaamielinen puolue, lit. 'Swedish Free-Minded Party', RVP) was a political party in Finland, working amongst the Swedish-speaking minority. The party was founded in 1919 under the name of Swedish Left (In Swedish: Svensk Vänster, SV and in Finnish Ruotsalainen vasemmisto, RV). Ideologically, the party preferred a republican state rather than a monarchy, which differentiated them from the majority of the Swedish People's Party, which tended to hold more conservative views. The party was represented in the Parliament of Finland by Georg Schauman, Georg von Wendt and Max Sergelius. Internationally, the party was associated within the International Entente of Radical and Similar Democratic Parties. The party was dissolved in 1951.

In the 1945 parliamentary election, the party received 8,192 votes (0.48%) and won one seat.
