= Eliel Mickelsson =

Finnish politician (1886–1963)

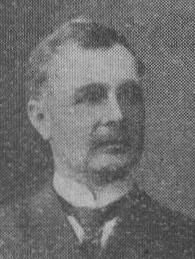
Member of the Parliament of Finland Eliel Mickelsson (1886-1963).

Anton Eliel Mickelsson (15 May 1886 – 10 January 1963) was a Finnish sea captain and politician, born in Korpo. He was a member of the Parliament of Finland from 1919 to 1922, representing the Social Democratic Party of Finland (SDP).
