= Antti Tossavainen =

Finnish politician

Anders (Antti) Tossavainen (11 June 1886, Nilsiä - 20 February 1962) was a Finnish salesperson and politician. He was a member of the Parliament of Finland from 1947 to 1948, representing the Social Democratic Party of Finland (SDP).
