= Raimo Tuomainen =

Finnish health sociologist (born 1957)

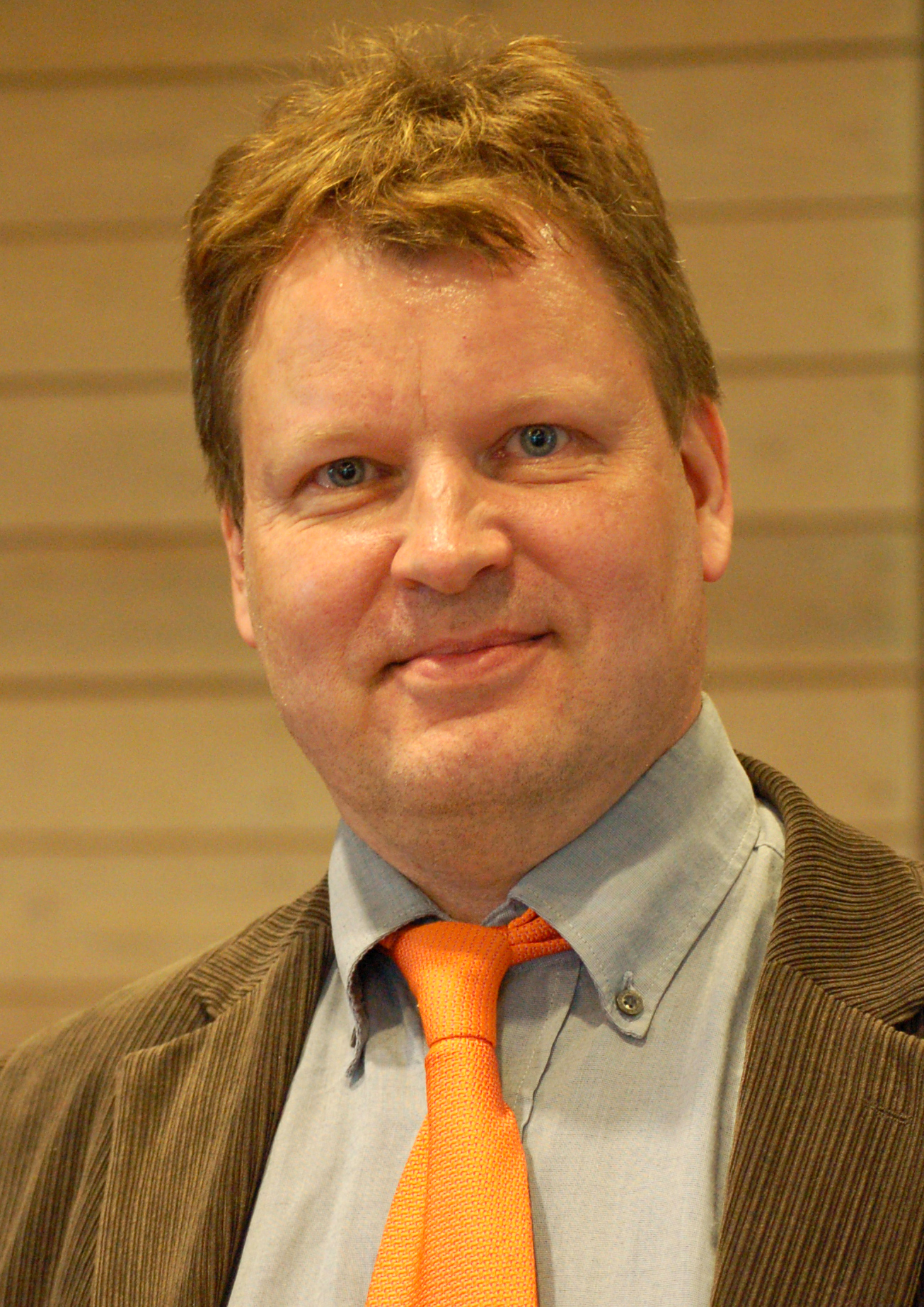
Raimo Tuomainen

Raimo Sakari Tuomainen (born 25 November 1957 in Nilsiä, Finland) is a Finnish health sociologist and one of the leading figures in the so-called Kuopio School, which emphasizes the need to control the expansion of medicalization in Western societies. His publications also deal with religion, science, demography, public health and healthcare administration. He is also known for his political activity within the Green League of Finland. Before retiring, Tuomainen worked at Kuopio University Hospital.

== Early life and education ==
Tuomainen was born in Nilsiä, near city of Kuopio, Finland. Most of his life he has lived in Kuopio. He studied at the University of Tampere, where he earned a Master’s degree in Administrative Sciences. Later he studied at the University of Kuopio (nowadays the University of Eastern Finland) and earned a Licentiate degree in Social Sciences.

== Academic career ==
Tuomainen worked at Kuopio University Hospital (KYS) for several decades, where he specialized in health sociology and medicalization studies. His research has addressed how modern societies increasingly define everyday experiences as medical problems, a phenomenon known as medicalization. Tuomainen also introduced the term paramedicalization to describe the further extension of different health beliefs outside medicine.

The publication of Medikalisaatio – aikamme sairaus marked a turning point in Finnish public discourse, as the concept of medicalization entered public awareness and the phenomenon began to receive attention in the media. Tuomainen's research has been cited in numerous Finnish publications on healthcare, including several doctoral dissertations.

He has published widely on topics including health sociology, demography, the sociology of science and religion, and health administration. Tuomainen is also known for popularizing the concept of "paramedicalization," a critical view on how health discourses extend beyond traditional medical authority.

His notable works include:

- Tuomainen, R., Myllykangas, M., Elo, J., & Ryynänen, O.-P. Medikalisaatio. Aikamme sairaus (Medicalization: The Disease of Our Time). Tampere: Vastapaino, 1999. ISBN 951-768-049-X.
- Tuomainen, R., Elo, J., & Myllykangas, M. Paramedikalisaatio: terveystyötä lääketieteen katveessa (Paramedicalization: Work for Health in the Shadow of Medicine). Sosiaalilääketieteellinen aikakauslehti, 1995; 3:217–223.
- Tuomainen, R. Medikalisaatio (Medicalization). In: Michelsen T, Reijula K, Ala-Mursula L, Räsänen K, Uitti J (eds.). Työelämän perustietoa (Basic Knowledge of Working Life), pp. 189–203. Tallinn: Duodecim (The Finnish Medical Society Duodecim), 2018.

== Political and public activity ==
Tuomainen has also been active in politics. He has served as vice-chairman of the party council of the Finnish Green League, and as a city councilor in Kuopio from 2009 to 2012. In 2007, he was a parliamentary candidate in the Savonia-Karelia constituency, receiving 2,346 votes.

His ideological interests are especially in social ethics and social fairness. He emphasizes the importance of social climate in human well-being. Tuomainen has introduced the term “green feminism”, which promotes the dismantling of strict male and female roles and calls for societal support to advance gender equality. This concept was included in the Green League’s political program in 2006.

Tuomainen has published poetry and aphorisms, written columns for various local newspapers in Kuopio, and served as a long-standing lay judge in the Finnish judicial system. In recognition of his long and distinguished service as a lay judge, he has been awarded the honorary title of Herastuomari (Senior Lay Judge).

Tuomainen has eight children. He married a Nepali wife in 2011.
