= Jaakko Loukko =

Finnish politician

Jaakko Loukko (25 February 1870, Ylistaro - 17 September 1946) was a Finnish farmer and politician. He was a member of the Parliament of Finland, representing the Finnish Party from May to November 1918 and the Agrarian League from November 1918 to April 1924.
