= Gabriel Luukkonen =

Finnish politician

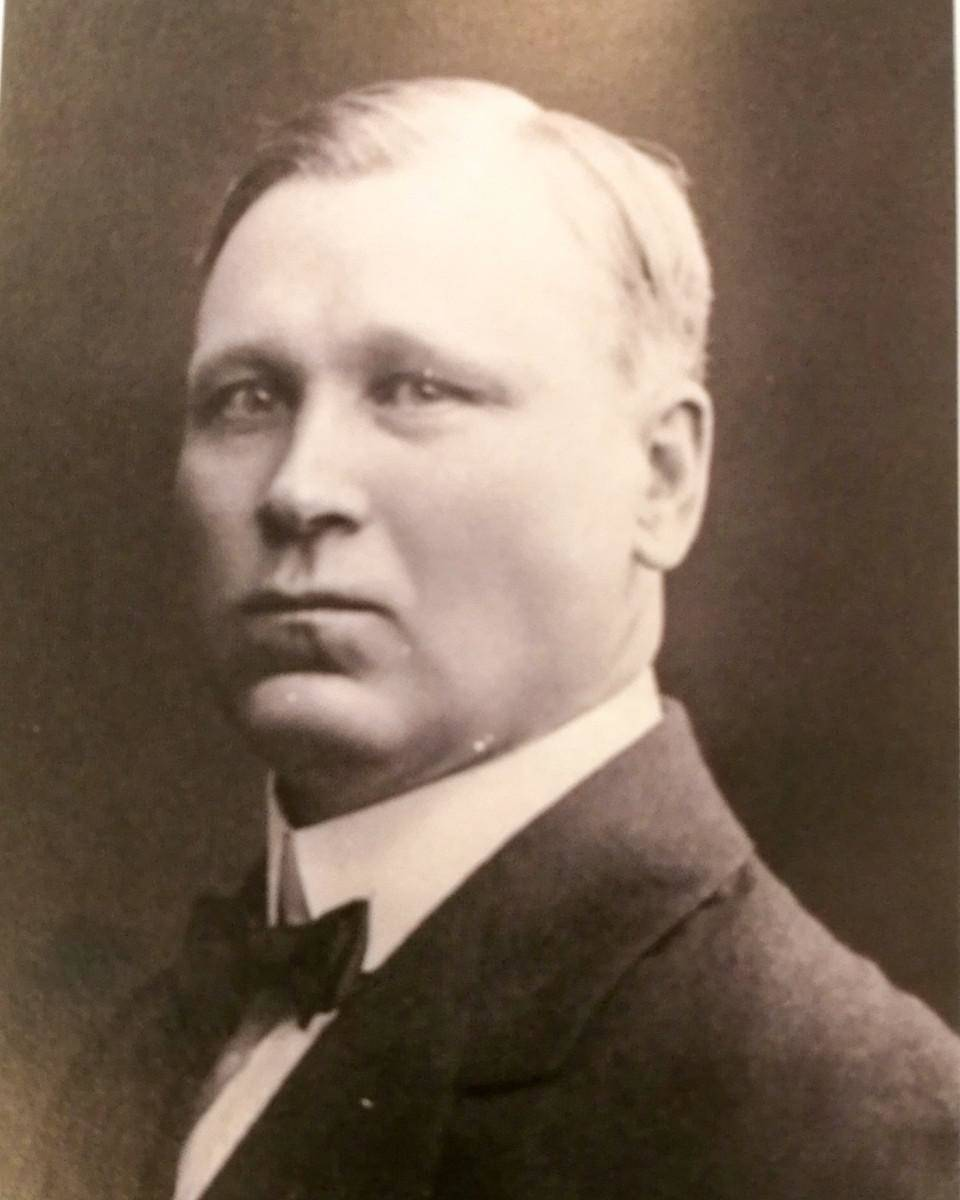
Gabriel Luukkonen (1880-1943)

Gabriel Luukkonen (22 January 1880, Juva – 11 October 1943) was a Finnish politician. He was a Member of the Parliament of Finland from 1919 to 1922, representing the Social Democratic Party of Finland (SDP).
