= Emil Hästbacka =

Finnish farmer and politician (1872–1951)

Johan Emil (J. E.) Hästbacka (30 June 1872 – 17 January 1951) was a Finnish farmer and politician, born in Terjärv. He was a member of the Parliament of Finland from 1917 to 1948, representing the Swedish People's Party of Finland.
