= Simson Pilkka =

Finnish politician

Simson Pilkka (12 June 1880, Uusikirkko Vpl - 6 November 1959) was a Finnish farmer and politician. He was a member of the Parliament of Finland from 1919 to 1924 and again from 1929 to 1930, representing the Agrarian League.
