= Väinö Juustila =

Finnish farmer and politician (1883–1933)

Väinö Henrik Juustila (17 April 1884 – 27 January 1933) was a Finnish farmer and politician, born in Liminka. He was a member of the Parliament of Finland from 1918 to 1922, representing the Young Finnish Party until 9 December 1918 and the National Coalition Party after that.
