= Kristian Åkerblom =

Finnish schoolteacher and politician (1877–1954)

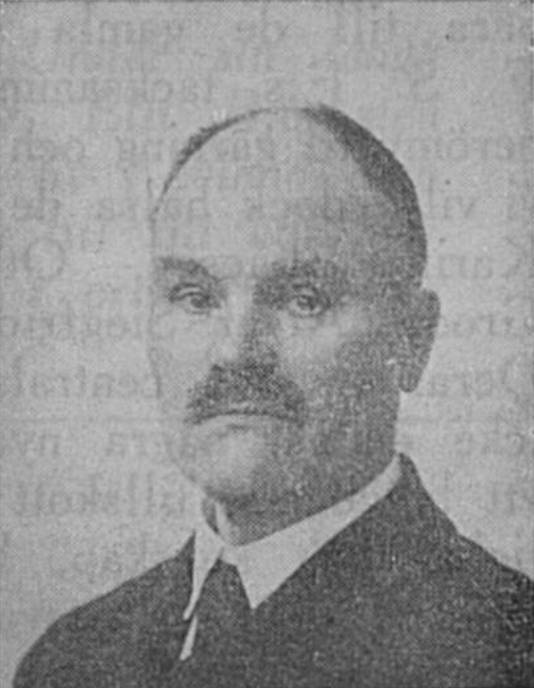
Kristian Åkerblom, 1940

Kristian Vilhelm (K. V.) Åkerblom (9 March 1877 – 19 March 1954) was a Finnish schoolteacher and politician, born in Vörå. He was a member of the Parliament of Finland from 1916 to 1917, from 1919 to 1929 and from 1930 to 1933, representing the Swedish People's Party of Finland.
