= Valto Käkelä =

Finnish politician (1908–1977)

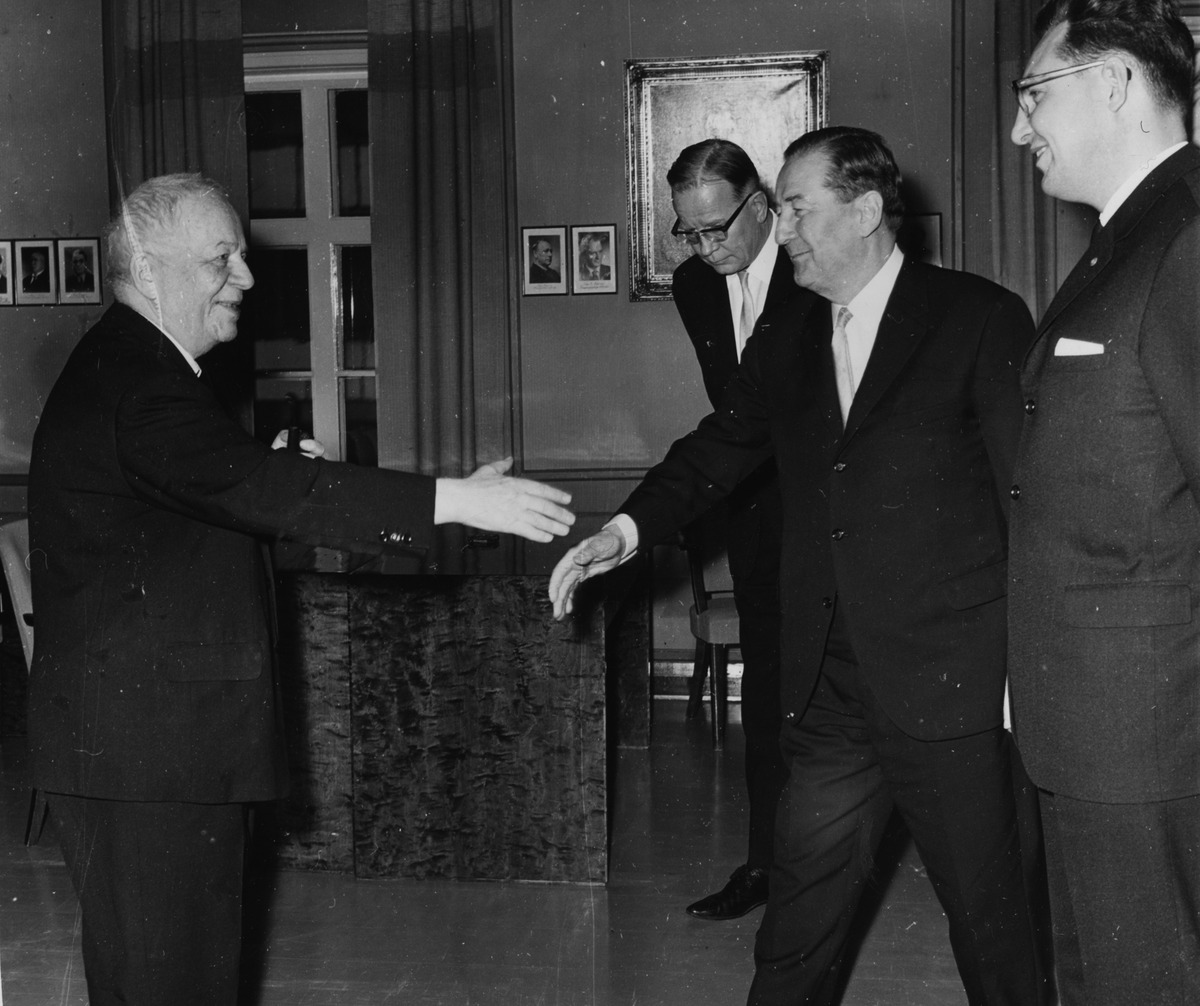
Member of Parliament Valto Käkelä (center right) greeting Professor Martti J. Mustakallio on New Year's Day in 1967

Valto Edvard Käkelä (19 April 1908 – 30 January 1977) was a Finnish politician. He was born in Lappee.

== Career ==
He served as Minister of the Interior from 30 September 1955 to 3 March 1956 and as Deputy Minister of Finance from 15 July 1970 to 28 October 1971. He was a Member of the Parliament of Finland from 1945 to 1972, representing the Social Democratic Party of Finland (SDP).
