= Matti Mannonen =

Finnish sea captain and politician (1871–1942)

Matti Mannonen (5 April 1871 – 4 January 1942) was a Finnish sea captain and politician, born in Koivisto. He was a member of the Parliament of Finland from 1919 to 1922, representing the National Coalition Party.
