= Eero Hatva =

Finnish agronomist, farmer and politician (1872–1945)

Eero Viljam Hatva (2 April 1872 – 21 February 1945; surname until 1928 Hahl) was a Finnish agronomist, farmer and politician, born in Iisalmen maalaiskunta. He was a member of the Parliament of Finland from 1910 to 1913 and from 1917 to 1929, representing the Agrarian League. He served as Deputy Minister of Agriculture from 17 April 1919 to 9 April 1921 and as Minister of Transport and Public Works from 31 May to 22 November 1924. He was a presidential elector in the 1925 Finnish presidential election.
