= Aatu Halme =

Finnish politician

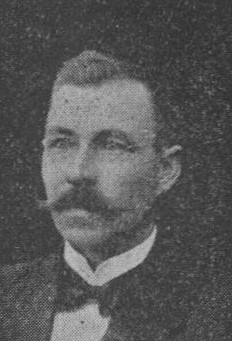

Adam (Aatu) Halme (4 December 1873 - 4 March 1933; surname until 1901 Möykkynen) was a Finnish construction worker, trade union functionary and politician, born in Nilsiä. He was a member of the Parliament of Finland from 1919 to 1922, representing the Social Democratic Party of Finland (SDP).
