= Vitali Taskinen =

Finnish ice hockey goaltender

- Born: July 27, 1986 (age 38); Kuopio, Finland
- Height: 6 ft 0 in (183 cm)
- Weight: 165 lb (75 kg; 11 st 11 lb)
- Position: Goaltender
- Caught: Left
- Played for: HC Slavia Praha
- Playing career: 2006–2010

Vitali Taskinen (born July 27, 1986) is a Finnish former professional ice hockey goaltender.

Taskinen began his career with KalPa's academy where he played from 2001 to 2006, but despite being dressed in three games he was released without ever playing for their senior team. He then moved to the Czech Republic and played three games with HC Slavia Praha of the Czech Extraliga.

Taskinen is currently working as a goaltender coach for Jokerit's U20 academy.
