= Kalle Fredrik Hakala =

Finnish construction foreman and politician (1884–1933)

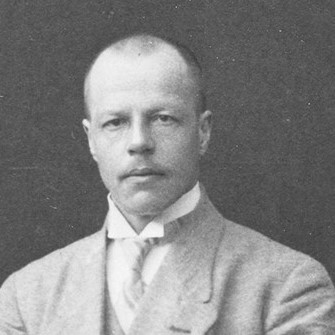
Kalle Fredrik Hakala

Karl (Kalle) Fredrik Hakala (16 February 1884 – 12 November 1933) was a Finnish construction foreman and politician, born in Alastaro. He was a member of the Parliament of Finland from 1919 to 1922, representing the Social Democratic Party of Finland (SDP).
