= Niilo Patinen =

Finnish schoolteacher and politician (1886–1947)

Niklas (Niilo) Patinen (14 January 1886 – 13 September 1947) was a Finnish carpenter and politician, born in Jyväskylän maalaiskunta. He was a member of the Parliament of Finland from 1919 to 1922, representing the Social Democratic Party of Finland (SDP).
