= Olli Hiltunen =

Finnish shoemaker and politician (1877–1947)

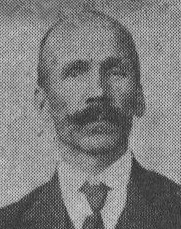
Olli Hiltunen

Olli Hiltunen (15 December 1877 – 8 June 1947) was a Finnish shoemaker and politician, born in Pielisjärvi. He was a member of the Parliament of Finland from 1916 to 1917 and from 1919 to 1922, representing the Social Democratic Party of Finland (SDP).
