= Elias Sinkko =

Finnish politician

Elias Sinkko (23 February 1871, Lemi – 3 January 1957) was a Finnish agronomist and politician. He was a Member of the Parliament of Finland from 1909 to 1910, from 1913 to 1922 and again from 1927 to 1929, representing the Young Finnish Party until December 1918 and the National Progressive Party thereafter.
