= August Leskinen =

Finnish politician (1876–1952)

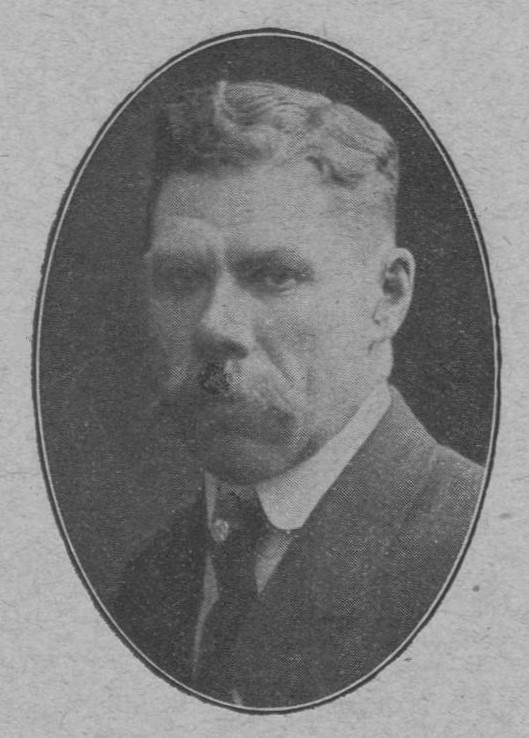
Member of the Parliament of Finland P. A. Leskinen (1876-1952)

Petter August Leskinen (20 February 1876, in Karttula – 7 August 1952) was a Finnish logger, construction worker and politician. He was a member of the Parliament of Finland from 1919 to 1922, representing the Social Democratic Party of Finland (SDP).
