= Bertta Leppälä =

Finnish schoolteacher and politician (1891–1966)

Bertta Leppälä (18 December 1891 – 6 June 1966; née Pykälä) was a Finnish politician, born in Helsinki. She was a member of the Parliament of Finland from 1917 to 1922, representing the Agrarian League. She was the daughter of Kalle Kustaa Pykälä. In 1919, she married fellow Member of Parliament Juhani Leppälä.
