= Jaakko Loppi =

Finnish schoolteacher, farmer and politician (1874–1946)

Juho Jaakko Loppi (28 September 1874 – 30 January 1946) was a Finnish schoolteacher and politician, born in Ilmajoki. He was a member of the Parliament of Finland from 1919 to 1922, representing the Agrarian League.
