= Georg von Wendt =

Finnish physician and politician (1876–1954)

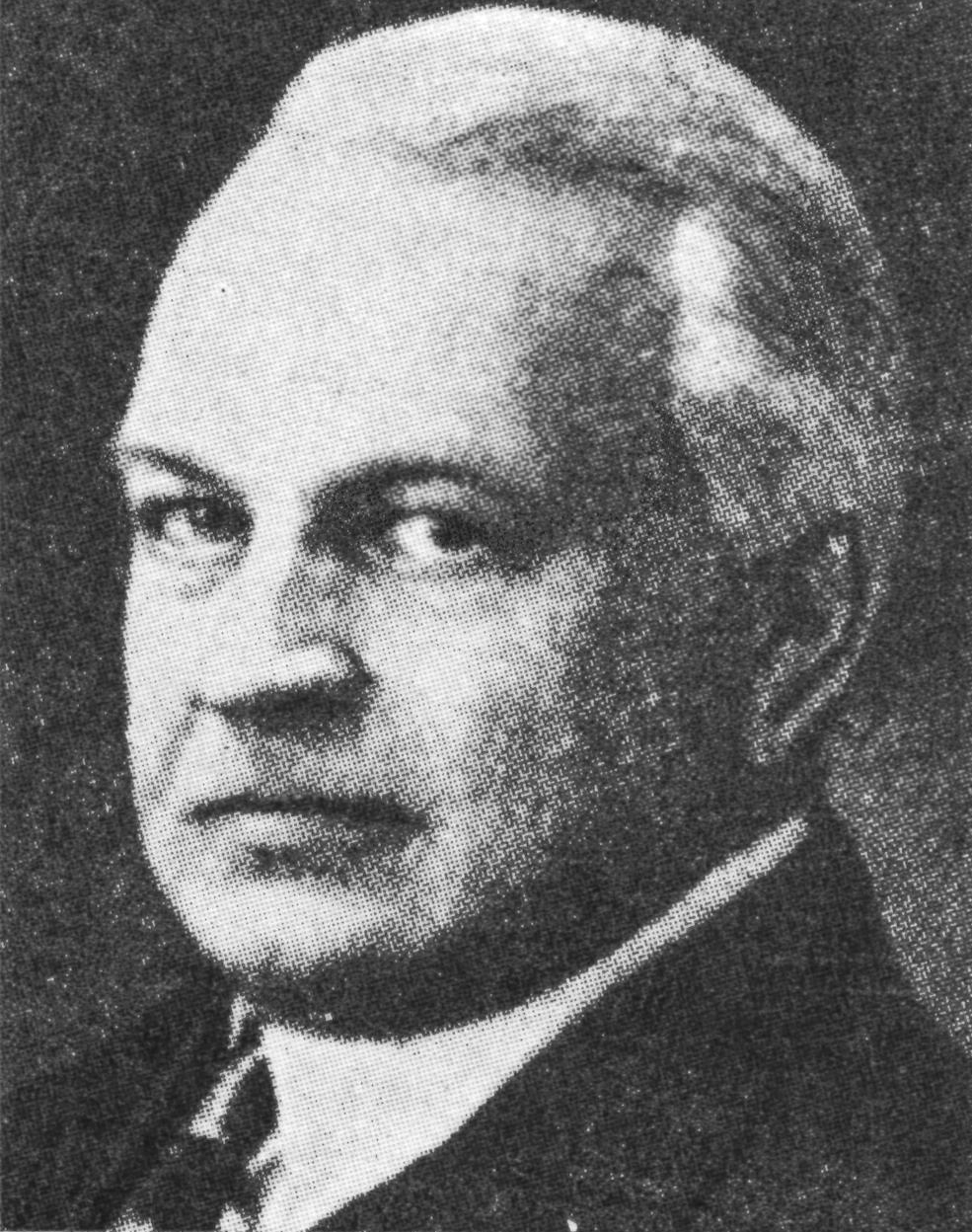
Georg von Wendt

Georg Willehad von Wendt (21 March 1876 – 17 May 1954) was a Finnish physician and politician, born in Helsinki. He was a member of the Diet of Finland from 1904 to 1905 and from 1905 to 1906 and of the Parliament of Finland from 1919 to 1922. He belonged to the Swedish People's Party of Finland until 1919 and to the Swedish Left after that. He was a presidential elector in the 1925 Finnish presidential election.

== Academic and Political Career ==
Georg Willehad von Wendt earned his Doctor of Medicine degree in Helsinki in 1905 and subsequently obtained a Ph.D. in physiology from Leipzig University in 1908. He served as a professor of animal husbandry at the University of Helsinki from 1910 to 1943. Von Wendt was actively involved in politics, representing the Swedish People's Party of Finland until 1919, after which he joined the Swedish Left. He was a member of the Diet of Finland during 1904–1905 and 1905–1906, and later served in the Parliament of Finland from 1919 to 1922. Additionally, he was a presidential elector in the 1925 Finnish presidential election. Von Wendt also contributed to municipal governance as a member of the Helsinki City Council during 1919–1921 and 1937–1943. In 1949, he published his memoirs titled Ur min levnads bokfilm.
