= Heikki Taskinen =

Finnish politician

Heikki Taskinen (27 March 1888, in Nilsiä – 25 April 1952) was a Finnish farmer and politician. He was a member of the Parliament of Finland from 1919 to 1922, representing the Agrarian League.
