= Anna Haapasalo =

Finnish baker and politician (1882–1965)

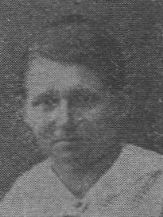
Anna Haapasalo

Anna Haapasalo (24 February 1882 – 13 June 1965; née Tiainen) was a Finnish baker and politician, born in Sortavalan maalaiskunta. She was a member of the Parliament of Finland from 1919 to 1922, representing the Social Democratic Party of Finland (SDP).
