= Pekka Tonteri =

Finnish politician

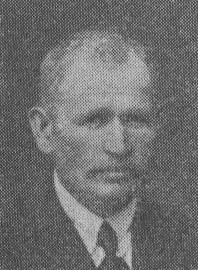
Pekka Tonteri (1880-1953)

Pekka Tonteri (22 October 1880, Antrea – 23 September 1953) was a Finnish farmer and politician. He served as a Member of the Parliament of Finland from 1919 to 1922, representing the Social Democratic Party of Finland (SDP).
