= Lennart Byman =

Finnish politician

Lennart Leander Byman (14 November 1875 in Helsinki – 3 March 1947) was a Finnish Lutheran clergyman and politician. He was a member of the Parliament of Finland from May to September 1922, representing the Swedish People's Party of Finland (SFP).
