= Pekka Saarelainen =

Finnish politician

Pekka Saarelainen (18 August 1868 – 16 May 1933) was a Finnish farmer and politician, born in Pielisjärvi. He was a member of the Parliament of Finland, representing the Finnish Party from 1909 to 1910 and the Agrarian League from 1913 to 1922 and again from 1924 to 1930.
