= Ville Korhonen (politician) =

Finnish politician

Olli Wilhelm (Ville) Korhonen (12 May 1877, Nilsiä – 6 September 1931) was a Finnish schoolteacher and politician. He was a member of the Parliament of Finland from 1919 to 1922, representing the Social Democratic Party of Finland (SDP).
