= Toivo Rintala =

Finnish politician

Toivo Henrik Rintala (24 October 1876, Sysmä – 16 December 1953) was a Finnish consumers' co-operative manager and politician. He served as a Member of the Parliament of Finland from 1919 to 1922, representing the Social Democratic Party of Finland (SDP).
