= Theodor Homén =

Finnish physicist and politician

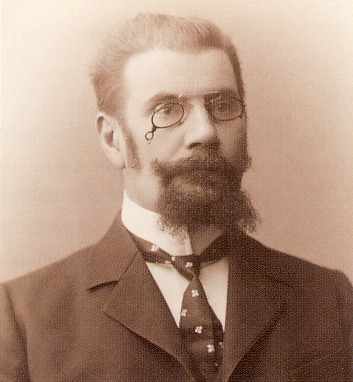
Theodor Homén

Viktor Theodor Homén (3 July 1858, Pieksämäki - 10 April 1923) was a Finnish physicist and politician. He was a member of the Diet of Finland from 1905 to 1906 and of the Parliament of Finland from 1908 to 1913, representing the Young Finnish Party and again from 1919 to 1922, representing the National Coalition Party.

== Publications ==
- Undersökning om elektr. motståndet hos förtunnad luft (1883)
- Ueber die Electricitätsleitung der Gase. 1-3 (1886-1888)
- I latinfrågan (1887)
- Om nattfroster (1893)
- Bodenphysikalische und meteorologische Beobachtungen mit besonderer Berücksichtigung des Nachtfrostphänomens (1894)
- Über die Bodentemperatur in Mustiala (1896)
- Der tägliche Wärmeumsatz im Boden und die Wärmestrahlung zwischen Himmel und Erde (1897)
- Om proportionella val särskildt med hänsyn till representationsreformkommitténs förslag (1906)
- Vårt passiva motstånd (1906)
- Passiivinen vastarintamme. Poliittisia kirjoituksia 1899-1904 (1906)
- Hydrographische Untersuchungen im nördlichen Teile der Ostsee, im Bottnischen und Finnischen Meerbusen in den Jahren 1898-1904 (1907)
- En dag vid Paanajärvi (1909)
- Våra skogar och vår vattenhushållning (1917)
- Inbjudning till de magister- och doktorspromotioner som Filosofiska fakulteten vid Helsingfors universitet med sedvanliga högtidligheter anställer i Universitetets solenn.sal den 31 maj 1919 kl. 11 f.m (1919)
