= Vili Taskinen =

Finnish politician

Vili Taskinen (10 October 1874, Juva – 20 October 1930) was a Finnish farmer and politician. He was a Member of the Parliament of Finland, representing the Finnish Party from 1916 to 1917 and the National Progressive Party from February to March 1919 and again from 1920 to 1922.
