= Juho Kananen =

Finnish politician (1874–1955)

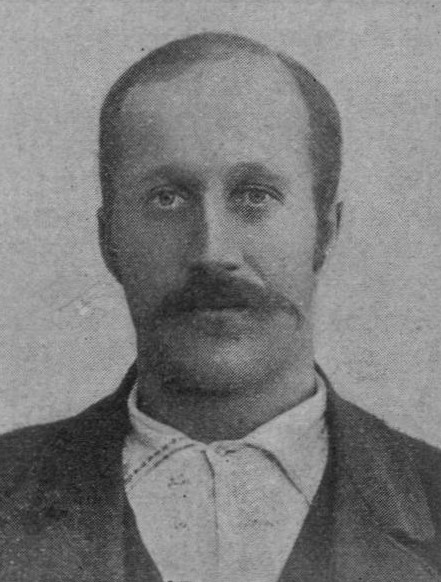
Juho Kananen

Juho Heikki Kananen (28 August 1874, Heinävesi – 4 March 1955) was a Finnish smallholder and politician. He served as a Member of the Parliament of Finland from 1911 to 1913 and from 1919 to 1922, representing the Social Democratic Party of Finland (SDP).
