= Ernst Estlander =

Finnish politician

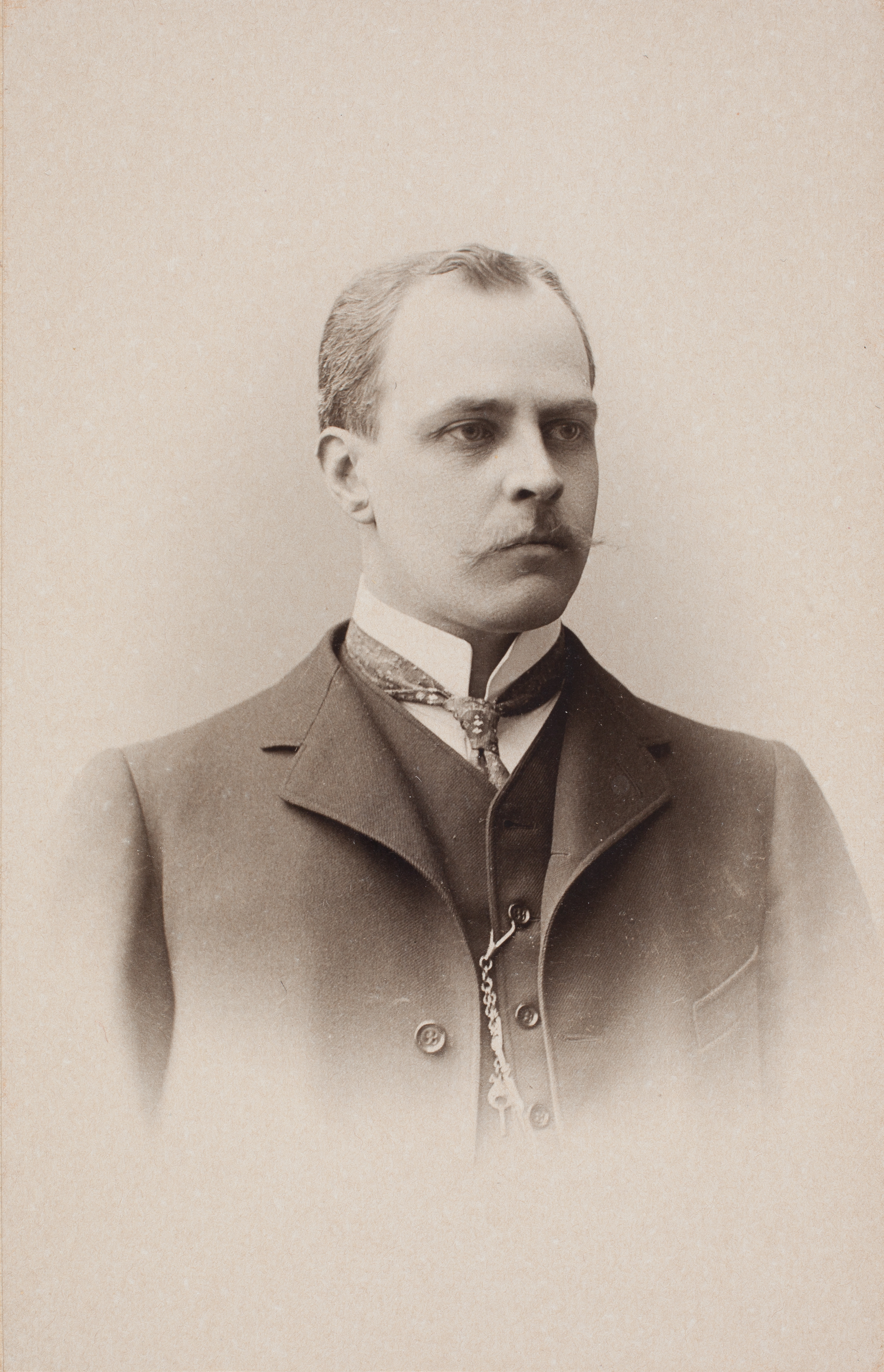
Ernst Estlander in the 1890s.

Ernst Henrik Estlander (18 September 1870 – 5 February 1949) was a Finland-Swedish legal scholar, professor at the University of Helsinki and politician. He was a member of the Diet of Finland from 1897 to 1906 and of the Parliament of Finland from 1907 to 1945, with breaks during 1913–1916 and 1920–1922, representing the Swedish People's Party of Finland (SFP). Known for his uncompromising legalism, Estlander opposed unlawful seizures of power irrespective of whether the demands came from the right or the left; the writer Sulo Wuolijoki described him as "constitutionalism personified". During the Continuation War, he was among the signatories of the "Petition of the Thirty-three", which was presented to President Ryti on 20 August 1943 by members of the Peace opposition.

== Background and academic career ==
Estlander was born in Helsinki as the son of Jakob August Estlander, professor of surgery, and Louise Rosina Federley. He lost his father at the age of eleven and remained unmarried throughout his life. His brother Gustaf Estlander was a speed skater, sailor and boat designer.

Estlander received his doctorate in law from the University of Helsinki in 1900. He became docent in legal history in 1902 and extraordinary professor in 1908, holding the chair until 1937. Trained in the tradition of legal positivism, he treated law as an autonomous system of rules. His scholarly output remained modest, in part because of his extensive political activity.

== Political career ==
=== Constitutionalist and member of the Diet ===
Estlander entered the Diet of Finland as a member of the Estate of Nobility in 1897. After the parliamentary reform of 1906, he was elected to the new unicameral Parliament of Finland in 1907 and held a seat until 1945, with breaks during 1913–1916 and 1920–1922. Although a native of Helsinki, he represented the southern constituency of Vaasa Province, where the Swedish-speaking population of southern Ostrobothnia tended towards political radicalism that suited him.

During the first period of Russification, Estlander chose uncompromising resistance. He was one of the leading figures in the underground passive resistance movement known as the Kagal, which helped organise opposition to conscription drafts perceived as unlawful. In the summer of 1904 he was exiled to Novgorod; when he was allowed to return and rejoin the Diet in December, students carried him in procession from the railway station to the nation house.

=== 1917, the Civil War and monarchism ===
After the Russian March Revolution of 1917, Estlander, paradoxically for a constitutionalist, was among the most legalistic supporters of continued loyalty to Russia and was cautious about Finnish independence. In his view, Finland lacked a juridical right to independence: whoever had inherited the autocratic ruler's power in Russia had to be recognised as holder of supreme authority. After the Finnish Civil War of 1918, Estlander and other Finland-Swedish conservatives were among the most ardent monarchists and also advocated other reactionary constitutional measures, such as an upper house, increased corporate representation in parliament and a graded franchise.

=== Shift of the SFP towards the centre ===
Estlander was one of the leading figures within the Swedish People's Party. As pressure from the Academic Karelia Society and the True Finn movement grew from the mid-1920s, he contributed to moving the SFP away from the right wing of the political spectrum. Bourgeois cooperation had no intrinsic value for him, and he was willing to seek support for the party's language policy from the social democrats. In parliament he defended Väinö Tanner's social democratic minority government of 1926, breaking with the line of his party colleague R. A. Wrede.

=== Opposition to the Lapua Movement ===
During the Lapua Movement of the early 1930s, Estlander's consistent legalism reasserted itself. Unlike Wrede, who held that the movement's "White" motives excused its unlawful excesses, Estlander argued that one had to resist the Lapua Movement just as one had resisted the Russification of 1899–1917 and the Reds of 1917–1918; yielding to unlawful pressure would undermine the moral foundation of the rule of law. He warned that the movement might result in a "True Finn police state" which, after crushing the left, could also threaten the Finland-Swedish minority.

== Other activities ==
Estlander served on the Helsinki City Council from 1912 to 1914. He competed as a sailor at the 1912 Summer Olympics in Stockholm, where he finished fifth as helmsman of Finn II in the 6 metre class.
