= Kustaa Ruuskanen =

Finnish politician

Kustaa Ruuskanen (23 March 1881, in Rantasalmi – 9 March 1971) was a Finnish farmer and politician. He served as a Member of the Parliament of Finland from 1919 to 1922, representing the National Progressive Party.
