= List of prime ministers of Finland =

This is a list of prime ministers of Finland since the establishment of that office in 1917.

== History ==
In 1918, the Finnish Senate was transformed into the Finnish Government, and the position of vice-chairman of the economic division of the Senate was transformed into the position of prime minister. Kesäranta (in Swedish Villa Bjälbo), located in the Meilahti neighborhood of Helsinki, has been the official residence of the prime minister of Finland since 1919.

Since its independence (declared on 6 December 1917), Finland has had 75 cabinets, including the current one, the longest lasting being the cabinet of Prime Minister Juha Sipilä, lasting 1,469 days.

Before the 1980s, cabinets tended to be short lived; the president was the most important political figure, and he had the right to form a new cabinet whenever he wanted. From the 1980s onwards, cabinets have tended to serve full terms (although the prime minister changed midterm in a few cases, most of the other cabinet members have remained nearly unchanged) and the prime minister has become more powerful a figure than the president. Under the current constitution, the prime minister is chosen by the parliament and only formally appointed by the president.

== List of prime ministers ==
Finnish cabinets and prime ministers are numbered sequentially. A prime minister can serve as the head of multiple cabinets. For example, Matti Vanhanen is both the 39th and the 40th prime minister.

No.	Portrait	Name (Birth–Death)	Term of office			Election	Party	Cabinet Coalition	President (Tenure)
No.	Portrait	Name (Birth–Death)	Took office	Left office	Duration	Election	Party	Cabinet Coalition	President (Tenure)
1		Pehr Evind Svinhufvud (1861–1944)	27 November 1917	27 May 1918	182 days	1917	Young Finnish	1. Svinhufvud I SP–NSP–ML–RKP (minority)	None
2		Juho Kusti Paasikivi (1870–1956)	27 May 1918	27 November 1918	185 days	—	Finnish	2. Paasikivi I SP–NSP–ML–RKP (minority)	Regent; Pehr Evind Svinhufvud (1918)
3		Lauri Ingman (1868–1934)	27 November 1918	17 April 1919	142 days	—	National Coalition	3. Ingman I KOK–ED–RKP	Regent; Pehr Evind Svinhufvud (1918)
3		Lauri Ingman (1868–1934)	27 November 1918	17 April 1919	142 days	—	National Coalition	3. Ingman I KOK–ED–RKP	Regent; Carl Gustaf Emil Mannerheim (1918–1919)
4		Kaarlo Castrén (1860–1938)	17 April 1919	15 August 1919	121 days	1919	National Progressive	4. K. Castrén; ML–ED–RKP (minority)	Regent; Carl Gustaf Emil Mannerheim (1918–1919)
4		Kaarlo Castrén (1860–1938)	17 April 1919	15 August 1919	121 days	1919	National Progressive	4. K. Castrén; ML–ED–RKP (minority)	Kaarlo Juho Ståhlberg (1919–1925)
5		Juho Vennola (1872–1938)	15 August 1919	15 March 1920	214 days	—	National Progressive	5. Vennola I ML–ED (minority)	Kaarlo Juho Ståhlberg (1919–1925)
6		Rafael Erich (1879–1946)	15 March 1920	9 April 1921	1 year, 26 days	—	National Coalition	6. Erich; KOK–ML–ED–RKP	Kaarlo Juho Ståhlberg (1919–1925)
(5)		Juho Vennola (1872–1938)	9 April 1921	2 June 1922	1 year, 55 days	—	National Progressive	7. Vennola II; ML–ED (minority)	Kaarlo Juho Ståhlberg (1919–1925)
7		Aimo Cajander (1879–1943)	2 June 1922	14 November 1922	166 days	1922	Independent	8. Cajander I; (caretaker)	Kaarlo Juho Ståhlberg (1919–1925)
8		Kyösti Kallio (1873–1940)	14 November 1922	18 January 1924	1 year, 66 days	—	Agrarian	9. Kallio I ML–ED (minority)	Kaarlo Juho Ståhlberg (1919–1925)
(7)		Aimo Cajander (1879–1943)	18 January 1924	31 May 1924	135 days	—	Independent	10. Cajander II; (caretaker)	Kaarlo Juho Ståhlberg (1919–1925)
(3)		Lauri Ingman (1868–1934)	31 May 1924	31 March 1925	305 days	1924	National Coalition	11. Ingman II; KOK–ML–ED–RKP	Kaarlo Juho Ståhlberg (1919–1925)
(3)		Lauri Ingman (1868–1934)	31 May 1924	31 March 1925	305 days	1924	National Coalition	11. Ingman II; KOK–ML–ED–RKP	Lauri Kristian Relander (1925–1931)
9		Antti Tulenheimo (1879–1952)	31 March 1925	31 December 1925	276 days	—	National Coalition	12. Tulenheimo; KOK–ML (minority)	Lauri Kristian Relander (1925–1931)
(8)		Kyösti Kallio (1873–1940)	31 December 1925	13 December 1926	348 days	—	Agrarian	13. Kallio II; ML–KOK (minority)	Lauri Kristian Relander (1925–1931)
10		Väinö Tanner (1881–1966)	13 December 1926	17 December 1927	1 year, 5 days	—	Social Democratic	14. Tanner; SDP (minority)	Lauri Kristian Relander (1925–1931)
11		Juho Sunila (1875–1936)	17 December 1927	22 December 1928	1 year, 6 days	1927	Agrarian	15. Sunila I ML (minority)	Lauri Kristian Relander (1925–1931)
12		Oskari Mantere (1874–1942)	22 December 1928	16 August 1929	238 days	—	National Progressive	16. Mantere; ED (minority)	Lauri Kristian Relander (1925–1931)
(8)		Kyösti Kallio (1873–1940)	16 August 1929	4 July 1930	323 days	1929	Agrarian	17. Kallio III; ML (minority)	Lauri Kristian Relander (1925–1931)
(1)		Pehr Evind Svinhufvud (1861–1944)	4 July 1930	18 February 1931	230 days	—	National Coalition	18. Svinhufvud II; ML–KOK–ED–RKP	Lauri Kristian Relander (1925–1931)
(1)		Pehr Evind Svinhufvud (1861–1944)	4 July 1930	18 February 1931	230 days	1930	National Coalition	18. Svinhufvud II; ML–KOK–ED–RKP	Lauri Kristian Relander (1925–1931)
—		Juho Vennola (1872–1938); Interim Prime Minister	18 February 1931	21 March 1931	32 days	—	National Progressive	18. Svinhufvud II; ML–KOK–ED–RKP	Pehr Evind Svinhufvud (1931–1937)
(11)		Juho Sunila (1875–1936)	21 March 1931	14 December 1932	1 year, 269 days	—	Agrarian	19. Sunila II; ML–KOK–ED–RKP	Pehr Evind Svinhufvud (1931–1937)
13		Toivo Mikael Kivimäki (1886–1968)	14 December 1932	7 October 1936	3 years, 298 days	—	National Progressive	20. Kivimäki; ML–ED–RKP (minority)	Pehr Evind Svinhufvud (1931–1937)
13		Toivo Mikael Kivimäki (1886–1968)	14 December 1932	7 October 1936	3 years, 298 days	1933	National Progressive	20. Kivimäki; ML–ED–RKP (minority)	Pehr Evind Svinhufvud (1931–1937)
(8)		Kyösti Kallio (1873–1940)	7 October 1936	17 February 1937	134 days	1936	Agrarian	21. Kallio IV; ML–ED (minority)	Pehr Evind Svinhufvud (1931–1937)
—		Rudolf Holsti (1881–1945); Interim Prime Minister	17 February 1937	12 March 1937	24 days	—	National Progressive	21. Kallio IV; ML–ED (minority)	Kyösti Kallio (1937–1940)
(7)		Aimo Cajander (1879–1943)	12 March 1937	1 December 1939	2 years, 265 days	—	National Progressive	22. Cajander III; SDP–ML–ED–RKP	Kyösti Kallio (1937–1940)
(7)		Aimo Cajander (1879–1943)	12 March 1937	1 December 1939	2 years, 265 days	1939	National Progressive	22. Cajander III; SDP–ML–ED–RKP	Kyösti Kallio (1937–1940)
14		Risto Ryti (1889–1956)	1 December 1939	19 December 1940	1 year, 19 days	—	National Progressive	23. Ryti I SDP–ML–ED–RKP	Kyösti Kallio (1937–1940)
14		Risto Ryti (1889–1956)	1 December 1939	19 December 1940	1 year, 19 days	—	National Progressive	24. Ryti I SDP–ML–KOK–ED–RKP	Kyösti Kallio (1937–1940)
—		Rudolf Walden (1878–1946); Interim Prime Minister	19 December 1940	4 January 1941	17 days	—	Independent	24. Ryti I SDP–ML–KOK–ED–RKP	Risto Ryti (1940–1944)
15		Johan Wilhelm Rangell (1894–1982)	4 January 1941	5 March 1943	2 years, 61 days	—	National Progressive	25. Rangell; SDP–ML–KOK–RKP–ED–IKL	Risto Ryti (1940–1944)
16		Edwin Linkomies (1894–1963)	5 March 1943	8 August 1944	1 year, 157 days	—	National Coalition	26. Linkomies; KOK–SDP–ML–RKP–ED	Risto Ryti (1940–1944)
16		Edwin Linkomies (1894–1963)	5 March 1943	8 August 1944	1 year, 157 days	—	National Coalition	26. Linkomies; KOK–SDP–ML–RKP–ED	Carl Gustaf Emil Mannerheim (1944–1946)
17		Antti Hackzell (1881–1946)	8 August 1944	21 September 1944	45 days	—	Independent	27. Hackzell; KOK–SDP–ML–RKP–ED	Carl Gustaf Emil Mannerheim (1944–1946)
18		Urho Castrén (1886–1965)	21 September 1944	17 November 1944	58 days	—	National Coalition	28. U. Castrén; KOK–SDP–ML–RKP–ED	Carl Gustaf Emil Mannerheim (1944–1946)
(2)		Juho Kusti Paasikivi (1870–1956)	17 November 1944	9 March 1946	1 year, 113 days	—	National Coalition	29. Paasikivi II; SDP–SKDL–ML–KOK–RKP–ED	Carl Gustaf Emil Mannerheim (1944–1946)
(2)		Juho Kusti Paasikivi (1870–1956)	17 November 1944	9 March 1946	1 year, 113 days	1945	National Coalition	30. Paasikivi III; SDP–SKDL–ML–ED–RKP	Carl Gustaf Emil Mannerheim (1944–1946)
—		Carl Enckell (1876–1959); Interim Prime Minister	9 March 1946	26 March 1946	18 days	—	Independent	30. Paasikivi III; SDP–SKDL–ML–ED–RKP	Carl Gustaf Emil Mannerheim (1944–1946)
—		Carl Enckell (1876–1959); Interim Prime Minister	9 March 1946	26 March 1946	18 days	—	Independent	30. Paasikivi III; SDP–SKDL–ML–ED–RKP	Juho Kusti Paasikivi (1946–1956)
19		Mauno Pekkala (1890–1952)	26 March 1946	29 July 1948	2 years, 126 days	—	SKDL	31. Pekkala; SKDL–SDP–ML–RKP	Juho Kusti Paasikivi (1946–1956)
20		Karl-August Fagerholm (1901–1984)	29 July 1948	17 March 1950	1 year, 232 days	1948	Social Democratic	32. Fagerholm I SDP (minority)	Juho Kusti Paasikivi (1946–1956)
21		Urho Kekkonen (1900–1986)	17 March 1950	17 November 1953	3 years, 246 days	—	Agrarian	33. Kekkonen I ML–RKP–ED (minority)	Juho Kusti Paasikivi (1946–1956)
21		Urho Kekkonen (1900–1986)	17 March 1950	17 November 1953	3 years, 246 days	—	Agrarian	34. Kekkonen II; ML–SDP–RKP–ED	Juho Kusti Paasikivi (1946–1956)
21		Urho Kekkonen (1900–1986)	17 March 1950	17 November 1953	3 years, 246 days	1951	Agrarian	35. Kekkonen III; ML–SDP–RKP	Juho Kusti Paasikivi (1946–1956)
21		Urho Kekkonen (1900–1986)	17 March 1950	17 November 1953	3 years, 246 days	—	Agrarian	36. Kekkonen IV; ML–RKP (minority)	Juho Kusti Paasikivi (1946–1956)
22		Sakari Tuomioja (1911–1964)	17 November 1953	5 May 1954	170 days	—	Independent	37. Tuomioja; (caretaker)	Juho Kusti Paasikivi (1946–1956)
23		Ralf Törngren (1899–1961)	5 May 1954	20 October 1954	169 days	1954	Swedish People's	38. Törngren; SDP–ML–RKP	Juho Kusti Paasikivi (1946–1956)
(21)		Urho Kekkonen (1900–1986)	20 October 1954	3 March 1956	1 year, 136 days	—	Agrarian	39. Kekkonen V ML–SDP	Juho Kusti Paasikivi (1946–1956)
(20)		Karl-August Fagerholm (1901–1984)	3 March 1956	27 May 1957	1 year, 86 days	—	Social Democratic	40. Fagerholm II; SDP–ML–RKP	Urho Kekkonen (1956–1982)
24		V. J. Sukselainen (1906–1995)	27 May 1957	29 November 1957	187 days	—	Agrarian	41. Sukselainen I ML–RKP–KP	Urho Kekkonen (1956–1982)
25		Rainer von Fieandt (1890–1972)	29 November 1957	26 April 1958	149 days	—	Independent	42. von Fieandt; (caretaker)	Urho Kekkonen (1956–1982)
26		Reino Kuuskoski (1907–1965)	26 April 1958	29 August 1958	126 days	—	Independent	43. Kuuskoski; (caretaker)	Urho Kekkonen (1956–1982)
(20)		Karl-August Fagerholm (1901–1984)	29 August 1958	13 January 1959	138 days	1958	Social Democratic	44. Fagerholm III; SDP–ML–KOK–RKP–KP	Urho Kekkonen (1956–1982)
(24)		V. J. Sukselainen (1906–1995)	13 January 1959	3 July 1961	2 years, 183 days	—	Agrarian	45. Sukselainen II; ML–RKP (minority)	Urho Kekkonen (1956–1982)
—		Eemil Luukka (1892–1970); Interim Prime Minister	3 July 1961	14 July 1961	12 days	—	Agrarian	45. Sukselainen II; ML–RKP (minority)	Urho Kekkonen (1956–1982)
27		Martti Miettunen (1907–2002)	14 July 1961	13 April 1962	274 days	—	Agrarian	46. Miettunen I ML (minority)	Urho Kekkonen (1956–1982)
28		Ahti Karjalainen (1923–1990)	13 April 1962	18 December 1963	1 year, 250 days	1962	Agrarian	47. Karjalainen I ML–KOK–RKP–KP–TPSL	Urho Kekkonen (1956–1982)
29		Reino Ragnar Lehto (1898–1966)	18 December 1963	12 September 1964	270 days	—	Independent	48. Lehto; (caretaker)	Urho Kekkonen (1956–1982)
30		Johannes Virolainen (1914–2000)	12 September 1964	27 May 1966	1 year, 258 days	—	Agrarian	49. Virolainen; ML–KOK–RKP–KP	Urho Kekkonen (1956–1982)
31		Rafael Paasio (1903–1980)	27 May 1966	22 March 1968	1 year, 301 days	1966	Social Democratic	50. Paasio I SDP–KESK–SKDL–TPSL	Urho Kekkonen (1956–1982)
32		Mauno Koivisto (1923–2017)	22 March 1968	14 May 1970	2 years, 54 days	—	Social Democratic	51. Koivisto I SDP–KESK–SKDL–TPSL–RKP	Urho Kekkonen (1956–1982)
33		Teuvo Aura (1912–1999)	14 May 1970	15 July 1970	63 days	—	Independent	52. Aura I; (caretaker)	Urho Kekkonen (1956–1982)
(28)		Ahti Karjalainen (1923–1990)	15 July 1970	29 October 1971	1 year, 107 days	1970	Centre	53. Karjalainen II; KESK–SDP–SKDL–RKP–LKP	Urho Kekkonen (1956–1982)
(33)		Teuvo Aura (1912–1999)	29 October 1971	23 February 1972	118 days	—	Independent	54. Aura II; (caretaker)	Urho Kekkonen (1956–1982)
(31)		Rafael Paasio (1903–1980)	23 February 1972	4 September 1972	195 days	1972	Social Democratic	55. Paasio II; SDP (minority)	Urho Kekkonen (1956–1982)
34		Kalevi Sorsa (1930–2004)	4 September 1972	13 June 1975	2 years, 283 days	—	Social Democratic	56. Sorsa I SDP–KESK–RKP–LKP	Urho Kekkonen (1956–1982)
35		Keijo Liinamaa (1929–1980)	13 June 1975	30 November 1975	171 days	—	Independent	57. Liinamaa; (caretaker)	Urho Kekkonen (1956–1982)
(27)		Martti Miettunen (1907–2002)	30 November 1975	15 May 1977	1 year, 167 days	1975	Centre	58. Miettunen II; KESK–RKP–LKP–SDP–SKDL (majority)	Urho Kekkonen (1956–1982)
(27)		Martti Miettunen (1907–2002)	30 November 1975	15 May 1977	1 year, 167 days	—	Centre	59. Miettunen III; KESK–RKP–LKP	Urho Kekkonen (1956–1982)
(34)		Kalevi Sorsa (1930–2004)	15 May 1977	26 May 1979	2 years, 12 days	—	Social Democratic	60. Sorsa II; SDP–KESK–SKDL–RKP–LKP	Urho Kekkonen (1956–1982)
(32)		Mauno Koivisto (1923–2017)	26 May 1979	27 October 1981	2 years, 155 days	1979	Social Democratic	61. Koivisto II; SDP–KESK–SKDL–RKP	Urho Kekkonen (1956–1982)
—		Eino Uusitalo (1924–2015); Interim Prime Minister	27 October 1981	19 February 1982	117 days	—	Centre	61. Koivisto II; SDP–KESK–SKDL–RKP	Mauno Koivisto (1982–1994)
(34)		Kalevi Sorsa (1930–2004)	19 February 1982	30 April 1987	5 years, 71 days	—	Social Democratic	62. Sorsa III; SDP–KESK–SKDL–RKP–LKP	Mauno Koivisto (1982–1994)
(34)		Kalevi Sorsa (1930–2004)	19 February 1982	30 April 1987	5 years, 71 days	1983	Social Democratic	63. Sorsa IV; SDP–KESK–RKP–SMP	Mauno Koivisto (1982–1994)
36		Harri Holkeri (1937–2011)	30 April 1987	26 April 1991	3 years, 362 days	1987	National Coalition	64. Holkeri; KOK–SDP–RKP–SMP	Mauno Koivisto (1982–1994)
37		Esko Aho (born 1954)	26 April 1991	13 April 1995	3 years, 353 days	1991	Centre	65. Aho; KESK–KOK–RKP–SKL	Mauno Koivisto (1982–1994)
37		Esko Aho (born 1954)	26 April 1991	13 April 1995	3 years, 353 days	1991	Centre	65. Aho; KESK–KOK–RKP–SKL	Martti Ahtisaari (1994–2000)
38		Paavo Lipponen (born 1941)	13 April 1995	17 April 2003	8 years, 5 days	1995	Social Democratic	66. Lipponen I SDP–KOK–RKP–VAS–VIHR	Martti Ahtisaari (1994–2000)
38		Paavo Lipponen (born 1941)	13 April 1995	17 April 2003	8 years, 5 days	1999	Social Democratic	67. Lipponen II; SDP–KOK–RKP–VAS–VIHR	Martti Ahtisaari (1994–2000)
38		Paavo Lipponen (born 1941)	13 April 1995	17 April 2003	8 years, 5 days	1999	Social Democratic	67. Lipponen II; SDP–KOK–RKP–VAS–VIHR	Tarja Halonen (2000–2012)
39		Anneli Jäätteenmäki (born 1955)	17 April 2003	24 June 2003	69 days	2003	Centre	68. Jäätteenmäki; KESK–SDP–RKP	Tarja Halonen (2000–2012)
40		Matti Vanhanen (born 1955)	24 June 2003	22 June 2010	6 years, 364 days	—	Centre	69. Vanhanen I KESK–SDP–RKP	Tarja Halonen (2000–2012)
40		Matti Vanhanen (born 1955)	24 June 2003	22 June 2010	6 years, 364 days	2007	Centre	70. Vanhanen II; KESK–KOK–RKP–VIHR	Tarja Halonen (2000–2012)
41		Mari Kiviniemi (born 1968)	22 June 2010	22 June 2011	1 year, 1 day	—	Centre	71. Kiviniemi; KESK–KOK–RKP–VIHR	Tarja Halonen (2000–2012)
42		Jyrki Katainen (born 1971)	22 June 2011	24 June 2014	3 years, 3 days	2011	National Coalition	72. Katainen; KOK–SDP–RKP–VAS–VIHR–KD	Tarja Halonen (2000–2012)
42		Jyrki Katainen (born 1971)	22 June 2011	24 June 2014	3 years, 3 days	2011	National Coalition	72. Katainen; KOK–SDP–RKP–VAS–VIHR–KD	Sauli Niinistö (2012–2024)
43		Alexander Stubb (born 1968)	24 June 2014	29 May 2015	340 days	—	National Coalition	73. Stubb; KOK–SDP–RKP–VIHR–KD	Sauli Niinistö (2012–2024)
44		Juha Sipilä (born 1961)	29 May 2015	6 June 2019	4 years, 9 days	2015	Centre	74. Sipilä; KESK–PS–KOK	Sauli Niinistö (2012–2024)
45		Antti Rinne (born 1962)	6 June 2019	10 December 2019	188 days	2019	Social Democratic	75. Rinne; SDP–KESK–VIHR–VAS–RKP	Sauli Niinistö (2012–2024)
46		Sanna Marin (born 1985)	10 December 2019	20 June 2023	3 years, 193 days	—	Social Democratic	76. Marin; SDP–KESK–VIHR–VAS–RKP	Sauli Niinistö (2012–2024)
47		Petteri Orpo (born 1969)	20 June 2023	Incumbent	3 years, 16 days	2023	National Coalition	77. Orpo; KOK–PS–RKP–KD	Sauli Niinistö (2012–2024)
47		Petteri Orpo (born 1969)	20 June 2023	Incumbent	3 years, 16 days	2023	National Coalition	77. Orpo; KOK–PS–RKP–KD	Alexander Stubb (since 2024)

== See also ==
- Politics of Finland
- Lists of incumbents
- President of Finland
  - List of presidents of Finland
- Senate of Finland
