= Vennola II cabinet =

Sixth government of the Republic of Finland

Vennola II Cabinet
- 7th Cabinet of Finland
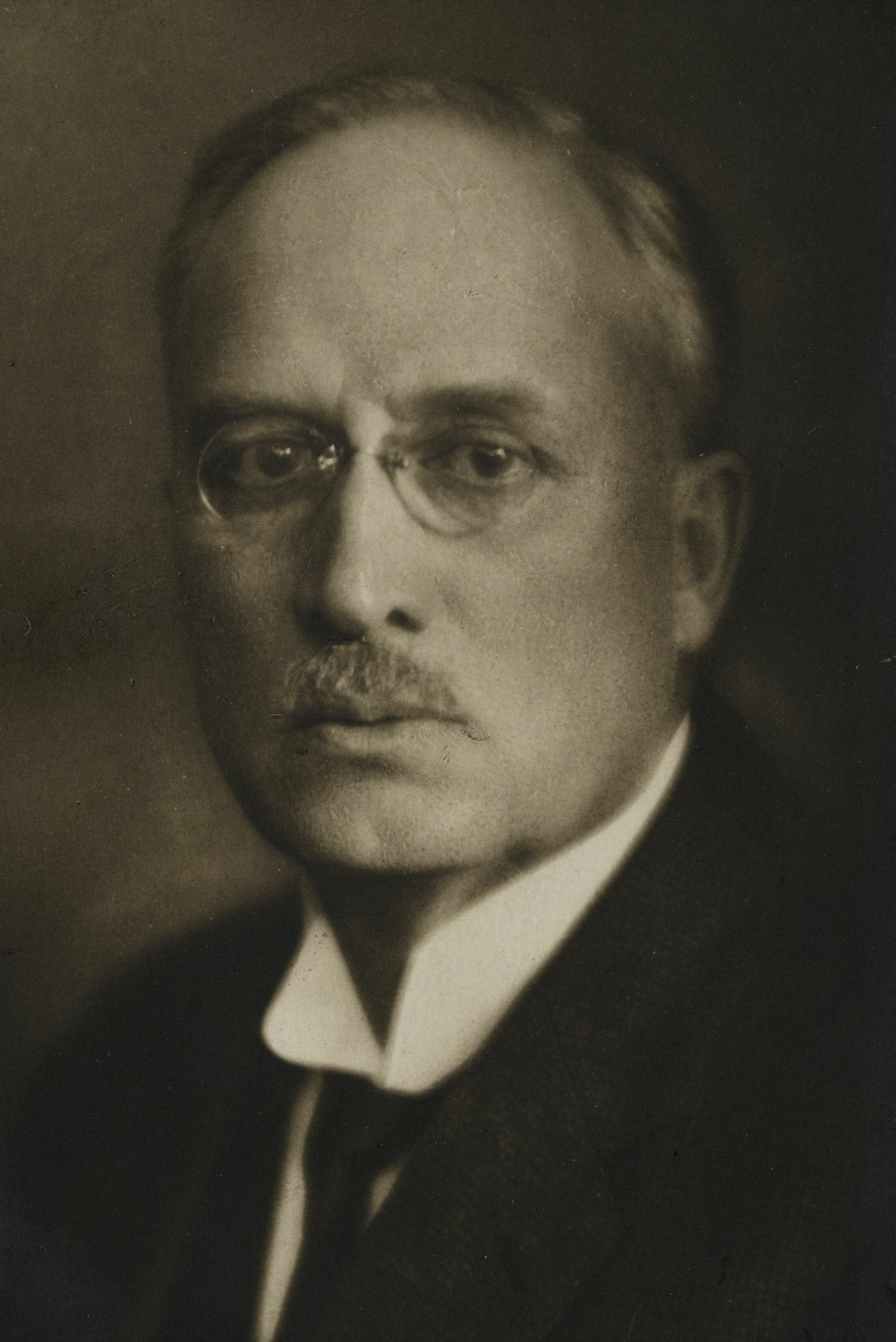
- Juho Vennola
- Date formed: 9 April 1921
- Date dissolved: 2 June 1922

People and organisations
- Prime Minister: Juho Vennola
- Total no. of members: 12
- Member parties: Agrarian League; National Progressive
- Status in legislature: Minority government

History
- Predecessor: Erich
- Successor: Cajander I

Juho Vennola's second cabinet was the seventh Government of Republic of Finland. Cabinet's time period was April 9, 1921 – June 2, 1922. It was a minority government. Minister of the Interior Heikki Ritavuori was assassinated in Helsinki February 14, 1922 in front of his home door. This was the only assassination in the history of independent Finland.

Assembly
Minister	Period of office	Party
Prime Minister; Juho Vennola	April 9, 1921 – June 2, 1922	National Progressive Party
Minister for Foreign Affairs; Rudolf Holsti	April 9, 1921 – June 2, 1922	National Progressive Party
Minister of Justice; Heimo Helminen; Albert von Hellens	April 9, 1921 – June 2, 1922; July 28, 1920 – April 9, 1921	National Progressive Party; National Progressive Party
Minister of War; Onni Hämäläinen; Bruno Jalander	April 9, 1921 – June 2, 1922; October 3, 1921 – June 2, 1922	Public servant Public servant
Minister of the Interior; Heikki Ritavuori	April 9, 1921 – June 2, 1922; February 24, 1922 – June 2, 1922	National Progressive Party; National Progressive Party
Minister of Finance; Risto Ryti	April 9, 1921 – June 2, 1922	National Progressive Party
Minister of Education and Ecclesiastical Affairs; Niilo Liakka	April 9, 1921 – June 2, 1922	Agrarian League
Minister of Agriculture; Kyösti Kallio	April 9, 1921 – June 2, 1922	Agrarian League
Deputy Minister of Agriculture; Juho Niukkanen	April 9, 1921 – June 2, 1922	Agrarian League
Minister of Transport and Public Works; Erkki Pullinen	April 9, 1921 – June 2, 1922	National Progressive Party
Minister of Trade and Industry; Erkki Makkonen	April 9, 1921 – June 2, 1922	National Progressive Party
Minister of Social Affairs; Vilkku Joukahainen	April 9, 1921 – June 2, 1922	Agrarian League

Preceded by Erich	Government of Finland; April 9, 1921 – June 2, 1922	Succeeded by Cajander I
