= Erich cabinet =

6th cabinet of Finland

Erich Cabinet
- 6th Cabinet of Finland
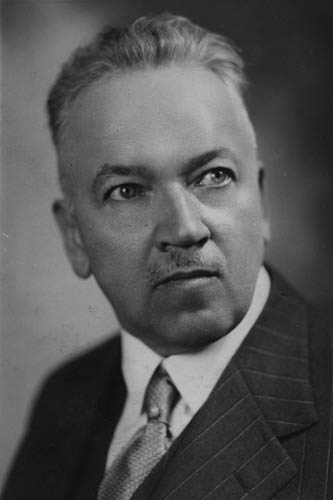
- Finnish politician Rafael Erich
- Date formed: 15 March 1920
- Date dissolved: 9 April 1921

People and organisations
- Prime Minister: Rafael Erich
- Total no. of members: 12
- Member parties: National Coalition; National Progressive; Agrarian League; RKP
- Status in legislature: Minority government

History
- Predecessor: Vennola I
- Successor: Vennola II

Rafael Erich's cabinet was the sixth Government of Republic of Finland. The cabinet's time period was March 15, 1920 – April 9, 1921. It was a minority government.

Erich's cabinet's main task was to conclude the official peace treaty with Soviet Russia. The treaty was signed in Tartu, Estonia, on October 14, 1920. Soviet Russia recognized Finland's independence officially and its frontier between the two countries.

== Assembly ==
Minister	Period of office	Party
Prime Minister; Rafael Erich	March 15, 1920 – April 9, 1921	National Coalition Party
Minister for Foreign Affairs; Rudolf Holsti	March 15, 1920 – April 9, 1921	National Progressive Party
Minister of Justice; Karl Söderholm; Hjalmar Granfelt	March 15, 1920 – June 28, 1920; June 28, 1920 – April 9, 1921	Swedish People's Party; Swedish People's Party
Minister of War; Bruno Jalander	March 15, 1920 – April 9, 1921	Independent
Minister of the Interior; Albert von Hellens	March 15, 1920 – April 9, 1921	National Progressive Party
Minister of Finance; Jonathan Wartiovaara	March 15, 1920 – April 9, 1921	National Coalition Party
Minister of Education and Ecclesiastical Affairs; Lauri Ingman	March 15, 1920 – April 9, 1921	National Coalition Party
Minister of Agriculture; Eero Yrjö Pehkonen	March 15, 1920 – April 9, 1921	Agrarian League
Deputy Minister of Agriculture; Eero Hahl	March 15, 1920 – April 9, 1921	Agrarian League
Minister of Transport and Public Works; Magnus Lavonius	March 15, 1920 – April 9, 1921	National Progressive Party
Minister of Trade and Industry; Leo Ehrnrooth; Hjalmar Procopé	March 15, 1920 – August 12, 1920; August 19, 1920 – April 9, 1921	Swedish People's Party; Swedish People's Party
Minister of Social Affairs; Vilkku Joukahainen	March 15, 1920 – April 9, 1921	Agrarian League
Minister of Food; Kaarlo Wuokoski	March 26, 1920 – April 9, 1921	National Progressive Party

Preceded by Vennola I	Government of Finland; November 27, 1918 – April 17, 1919	Succeeded by Vennola II
