= Kallio I cabinet =

Eighth Government of the Republic of Finland

Kallio I Cabinet
- 9th Cabinet of Finland
- Date formed: 14 November 1922
- Date dissolved: 18 January 1924

People and organisations
- Prime Minister: Kyösti Kallio
- Total no. of members: 12
- Member parties: Agrarian League; National Progressive
- Status in legislature: Minority government

History
- Predecessor: Cajander I
- Successor: Cajander II

Kyösti Kallio's first cabinet was the ninth Government of the Republic of Finland. The cabinet's time period was November 14, 1922 – January 18, 1924. It was minority government.

Minister
Minister	Period of office	Party
Prime Minister; Kyösti Kallio	November 14, 1922 – January 18, 1924	National Progressive Party
Minister for Foreign Affairs; Juho Vennola	November 14, 1922 – January 18, 1924	National Progressive Party
Minister of Justice; Otto Åkesson; Elias Sopanen	November 14, 1922 – January 18, 1924; December 21, 1923 – January 18, 1924	National Progressive Party; Agrarian League
Minister of Defence; Bruno Jalander; Kyösti Kallio; Vilho Nenonen	November 14, 1922 – January 18, 1924; June 22, 1923 – September 16, 1923; September 16, 1923 – January 18, 1924	Independent; Agrarian League; Independent
Minister of the Interior; Vilkku Joukahainen	November 14, 1922 – January 18, 1924	Agrarian League
Minister of Finance; Risto Ryti	November 14, 1922 – January 18, 1924	National Progressive Party
Minister of Education; Niilo Liakka	November 14, 1922 – January 18, 1924	Agrarian League
Minister of Agriculture; Juho Sunila	November 14, 1922 – January 18, 1924	Independent
Deputy Minister of Agriculture; Juho Niukkanen	November 14, 1922 – January 18, 1924	Agrarian League
Minister of Transport and Public Works; Aukusti Aho	November 14, 1922 – January 18, 1924	National Progressive Party
Minister of Trade and Industry; Erkki Pullinen	November 14, 1922 – January 18, 1924	Independent
Minister of Social Affairs; Oskari Mantere	November 14, 1922 – January 18, 1924	National Progressive Party

Preceded by Cajander I	Government of Finland; November 14, 1922–January 18, 1924	Succeeded by Cajander II
