= Bruno Jalander =

Finnish military officer and politician (1872–1966)

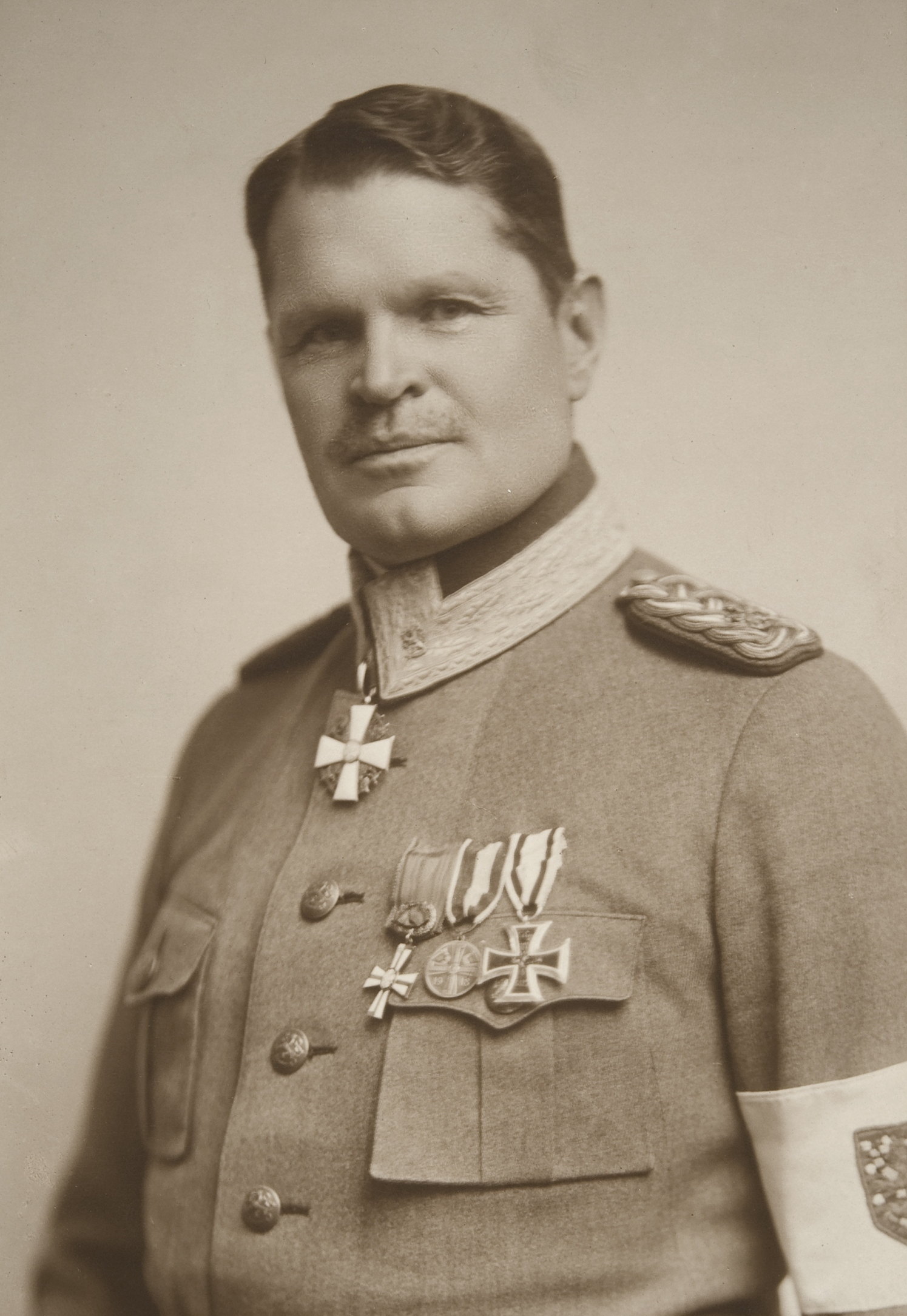

Minister of War
- In office 14 November 1922 – 22 June 1923
- Prime Minister: Aimo Cajander; Kyösti Kallio
- In office September 1921 – September 1921
- Prime Minister: Juho Vennola
- In office 15 March 1920 – April 1921
- Prime Minister: Rafael Erich

Personal details
- Born: Bruno Fredrik Jalander; 28 August 1872 Brahestad, Grand Duchy of Finland
- Died: 14 December 1966 (aged 94) Helsinki, Finland
- Party: National Coalition Party (until early 1920s); Nonpartisan (thereafter)
- Education: Finnish Cadet Corps, Fredrikshamn
- Occupation: Military officer

Bruno Jalander (28 August 1872 – 14 December 1966) was a Finnish military officer, civil servant and politician. He served as Governor of Nyland County from 1917 to 1932 and as Minister of War in four governments during the 1920s. Although he began his career as an activist in Finland's independence movement, he subsequently became an open opponent of right-wing activism and took a firm stand against the Lapua movement, which ultimately cost him his governorship. His second wife was the internationally renowned opera singer Aino Ackté.

== Early life and education ==
Jalander was born in Brahestad on 28 August 1872. He was educated at the Finnish Cadet Corps in Fredrikshamn.

== Career ==
=== Military service and early civil career ===
Jalander served in Nyland's Finnish sniper battalion until the Finnish national military was disbanded. For three years he served with a Russian troop unit in the Caucasus. He then worked in different jobs such as deputy chief of police and insurance inspector. When World War I broke out in 1914 Jalander resumed his military service in Russia where he served as company commander and battalion commander's adjutant in the defence units set up by the Petrograd Infantry Division. Following the February Revolution of 1917 Jalander began to work in the Office of the Governor-General of Finland. He was also a member of the military committee composed of activists who gathered to fight against Russian rule.

=== Governor of Nyland County ===
In November 1917 Jalander was promoted to the rank of lieutenant colonel and was appointed governor of Nyland County. In April 1918, after the German occupation of Helsinki, he resumed his post as governor. In June 1918 he joined the Finnish army as a colonel.

As governor, Jalander came into open conflict with Carl Gustaf Emil Mannerheim, then regent of Finland. Their differences centred on how to treat Russian refugees in Finland, Mannerheim's plan for a Finnish attack on Petrograd in support of the White Russian cause, and Jalander's view that Mannerheim had during the World War been more loyal to the Russian imperial cause than to Finnish independence. He served as governor until 1932, when he was forced to resign following his firm opposition to the Lapua movement.

=== Minister of War ===
On 15 March 1920 Jalander was appointed minister of war in Rafael Erich's cabinet. A few months later he was promoted to the rank of major general. The cabinet resigned in April 1921. In September 1921, Jalander was re-appointed minister of war to the second cabinet of Juho Vennola. One of his most significant acts as minister was securing the appointment of Lauri Malmberg as commander-in-chief of the Civil Guard in 1921, thereby preventing the election of Mannerheim to the post. Jalander continued to serve as minister of war in the cabinet led by Aimo Cajander and in the cabinet led by Kyösti Kallio between 14 November 1922 and 22 June 1923.

=== Opposition to the Lapua movement and dismissal ===
Jalander took a firm stand against the Lapua movement and played a direct role in the events that triggered the Mäntsälä rebellion of 1932. He refused to prevent the Social Democratic MP Mikko Erich from speaking at a workers' hall in Mäntsälä and dispatched 30 policemen with orders to arrest the armed Lapua men who had gathered there. The police proved unequal to the task, and demands for Jalander's dismissal grew into calls for the entire government to resign. He was forced to leave his post in the summer of 1932. His dismissal was said to be the consequence of a promise made by President Pehr Evind Svinhufvud to the leaders of the Mäntsälä uprising.

=== Later career ===
Jalander served as League of Nations evacuation chief during the Spanish Civil War in 1938–1939.

== Personal life ==
Jalander married three times. His first spouse was Nina Helena Schultz, with whom he wed in 1906. His second wife was an opera singer, Aino Ackté, and they married in 1919. Jalander's third spouse was Zoja Orloff, and they wed in 1947. Jalander died in Helsinki on 14 December 1966.
