= Ingman II cabinet =

Government of Finland (1924-1925)

Ingman II Cabinet
- 11th Cabinet of Finland
- Date formed: 31 May 1924
- Date dissolved: 31 March 1925

People and organisations
- Prime Minister: Lauri Ingman
- Total no. of members: 13
- Member parties: Agrarian League; National Coalition; RKP; National Progressive

History
- Predecessor: Cajander II
- Successor: Tulenheimo

Lauri Ingman's second cabinet was the 11th Government of independent Finland, serving between 31 May 1924 – 31 March 1925. It was formed following the 1924 parliamentary elections between four parties—National Coalition Party, Agrarian Party, National Progressive Party and Swedish People's Party—and had a majority in the parliament during the first six months. Overall, the cabinet lasted 305 days in office.

The cabinet lost its parliamentary majority after the Agrarian Party withdrew following a disagreement on the pension of government officials. The Ingman cabinet finally resigned four months due to defeat of an election bill in the parliament.

Assembly
Minister	Period of office	Party
Prime Minister; Lauri Ingman	31 May 1924 – 31 March 1925	National Coalition Party
Minister for Foreign Affairs; Hjalmar Procopé	31 May 1924 – 31 March 1925	Swedish People's Party
Minister of Justice; Albert von Hellens	January 18, 1924 – May 31, 1924	National Progressive Party
Minister of Defence; Lauri Malmberg	31 May 1924 – 31 March 1925	Independent
Minister of the Interior; Gunnar Sahlstein	31 May 1924 – 31 March 1925	National Coalition Party
Minister of Finance; Yrjö Pulkkinen	January 18, 1924 – May 31, 1924	National Coalition Party
Minister of Education; Lauri Ingman	31 May 1924 – 31 March 1925	National Coalition Party
Deputy Minister of Education; Antti Kukkonen; Oskari Mantere	31 May 1924 – 22 November 1924; 22 November 1924 – 31 March 1925	Agrarian League; National Progressive Party
Minister of Agriculture; Jalo Lahdensuo; Ilmari Auer	1 May 1924 – 22 November 1924; 22 November 1924 – 31 March 1925	National Progressive Party; Agrarian League
Deputy Minister of Agriculture; Ilmari Auer; Pekka Pennanen	May 31, 1924 – November 22, 1924; November 22, 1924 – March 31, 1925	National Progressive Party; National Coalition Party
Minister of Transport and Public Works; Eero Hahl; Rolf Witting	31 May 1924 – 22 November 1924; 22 November 1924 – 31 March 1925	Agrarian League; Swedish People's Party
Minister of Trade and Industry; Axel Palmgren	31 May 1924 – 31 March 1925	Swedish People's Party
Minister of Social Affairs; Niilo Liakka; Lauri Pohjala	31 May 1924 – 22 November 1924; 22 November 1924 – 31 March 1925	Agrarian League; National Coalition Party

Preceded by Cajander II	Government of Finland; 31 May 1924 – 31 March 1925.	Succeeded by Tulenheimo
