= Östen Elfving =

Finnish agricultural expert and politician

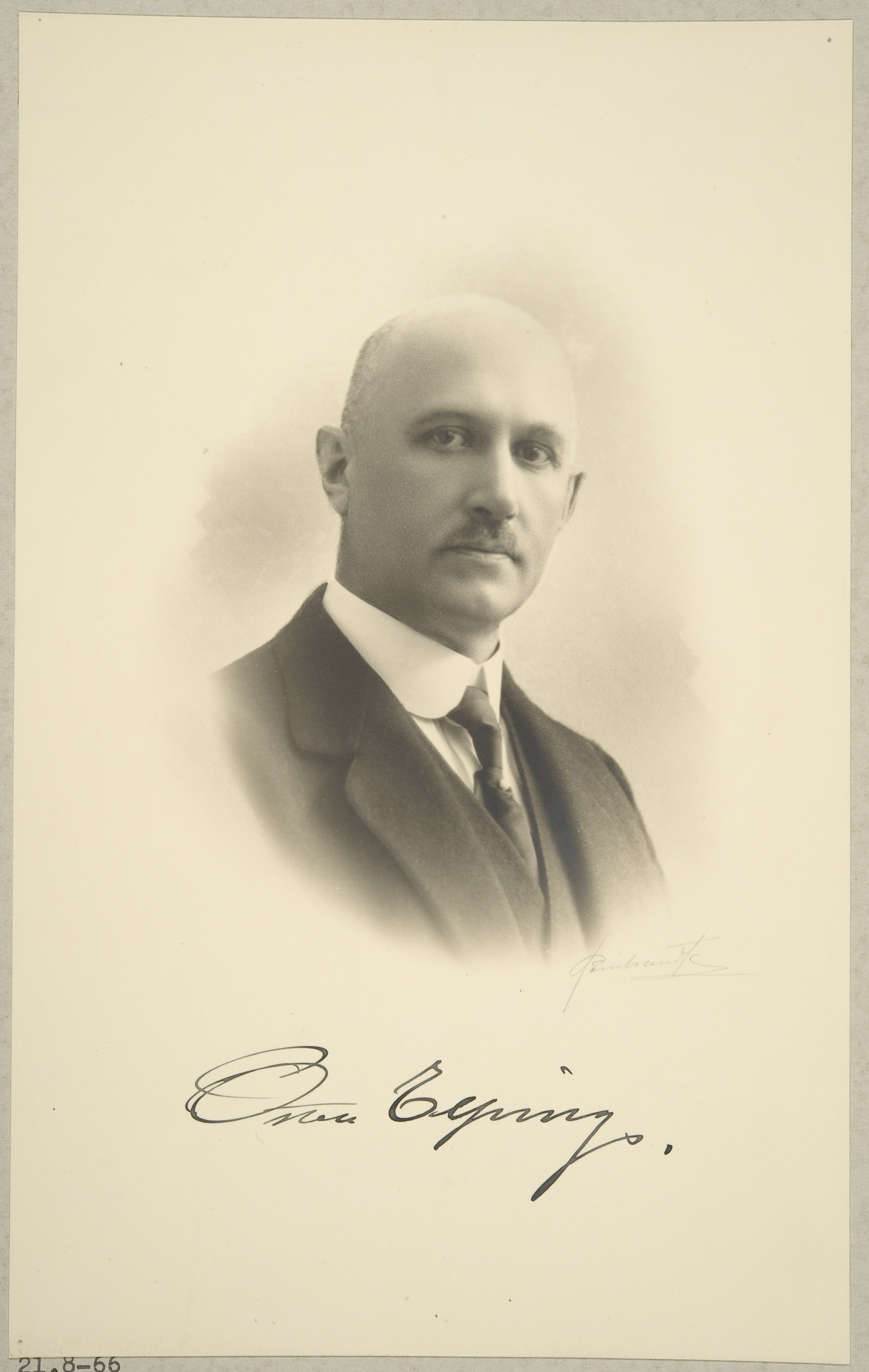

Minister of Agriculture
- In office 2 June 1922 – 14 November 1922
- Prime Minister: Aimo Kaarlo Cajander
- Preceded by: Kyösti Kallio
- Succeeded by: Juho Sunila
- In office 18 January 1924 – 31 May 1924
- Prime Minister: Aimo Kaarlo Cajander
- Preceded by: Juho Sunila
- Succeeded by: Jalo Lahdensuo

Personal details
- Born: 25 May 1874 Vaasa
- Died: 25 July 1936 (aged 62) Boden, Sweden
- Party: Independent
- Spouse(s): Aini Maria (from 1909)

Karl Östen Elfving (27 May 1874 Vaasa – 25 July 1936 Boden, Sweden) was a Finnish agricultural expert and politician.

Elfving's parents were the Mayor Karl Oskar Elfving and Jenny Sofia Nyman. Elfving's brother was Karl Oskar Elfving Younger (1872–1946) and sister teacher and writer Ester Ståhlberg (1870–1950) who was the second spouse of the President of the Republic of Finland K. J. Ståhlberg since 1920.

Elfving graduated in agronomy in 1895, as a Bachelor of Philosophy in 1911 and as a Licentiate in Philosophy (PhD) in 1915.

Elfving acted as a trustee, agricultural engineer, assistant to the county agronomist and as a consultant for agriculture until 1906, then until 1917 as an Inspector in the Settlement Board and as the Chief Executive of the Settlement Board in 1917–1926.

Elfving was part of the governing bodies of several agricultural organizations and foundations and participated in state committees. In 1917 he was chairman of the settlement committee and some reindeer herders' commissions.

He served as Minister of Agriculture at Cajander I and Cajander II governments in 1924, both as independent minister.

Between 1926 and 1930 Elfving was the Finnish Envoy in Oslo. Later he returned to cultivate his own farm, but at the same time he was responsible for the management of some large farms.

Elfving's spouse since 1909 was Aini Maria née Borg (born 1930). Their son Östen Elfving Jr was member of the Supreme Court and their other son Gustaf Elfving (born 1919) was a physician specializing in surgery.
