= Vennola I cabinet =

Fifth government of the Republic of Finland

Vennola I Cabinet
- 5th Cabinet of Finland
- Date formed: 15 August 1919
- Date dissolved: 15 March 1920

People and organisations
- Prime Minister: Juho Vennola
- Total no. of members: 14
- Member parties: National Progressive; Agrarian League
- Status in legislature: Minority government

History
- Predecessor: Kaarlo Castrén
- Successor: Erich

Juho Vennola's first cabinet was the fifth Government of Republic of Finland. The cabinet's time period was August 15, 1919 – March 15, 1920. It was a minority government.

== Assembly ==
Portfolio	Minister	Took office	Left office	Party
Prime Minister	Juho Vennola	September 15, 1919	March 15, 1920	National Progressive
Minister for Foreign Affairs	Rudolf Holsti	September 15, 1919	March 15, 1920	National Progressive
Minister of Justice	Henrik Kahelin	September 15, 1919	January 30, 1920	National Progressive
Minister of War	Karl Emil Berg	September 15, 1919	March 15, 1920	Public servant
Minister of the Interior	Heikki Ritavuori	September 15, 1919	March 15, 1920	National Progressive
Minister of Finance	Johannes Lundson	September 15, 1919	March 2, 1920	National Progressive
Minister of Church and Education	Mikael Soininen	September 15, 1919	March 15, 1920	National Progressive
Minister of Agriculture	Kyösti Kallio	September 15, 1919	March 15, 1920	Agrarian
Deputy Minister of Agriculture	Kyösti Kallio	September 15, 1919	March 15, 1920	Agrarian
Minister of Transport and Public Works	Santeri Pohjanpalo	September 15, 1919	March 15, 1920	National Progressive
Minister of Trade and Industry	Eero Erkko	September 15, 1919	March 15, 1920	National Progressive
Minister of Social Affairs	Santeri Alkio	September 15, 1919	March 15, 1920	Agrarian
Minister of Food	Mikko Collan	September 15, 1919	March 15, 1920	National Progressive
Minister without portfolio	Mikko Luopajärvi	September 15, 1919	January 5, 1920	Agrarian

Preceded by Kaarlo Castrén	Government of Finland; September 15, 1919 – March 15, 1920	Succeeded by Erich
