= Heikki Ritavuori =

Finnish political leader (1880 – 1922)

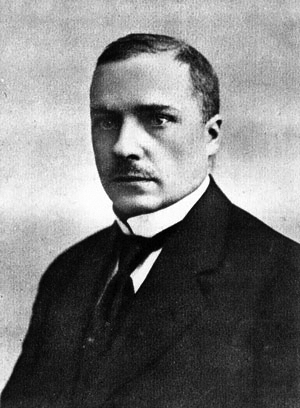
Heikki Ritavuori

Heikki Ritavuori (previously known as Henrik Rydman; 23 March 1880 – 14 February 1922) was a Finnish lawyer, a politician from the National Progressive Party, a member of the Parliament of Finland and Minister of the Interior. He was the closest colleague of President K. J. Ståhlberg and was Minister of the Interior in J. H. Vennola's first and second cabinets from 1919 to 1922 for a total of 526 days. Minister Ritavuori was shot dead at the door to his home in Helsinki in February 1922.

== Career ==
The murder of a government minister is such a rare occurrence in Finland that it has almost completely overshadowed Ritavuori's achievements as a builder of Finnish society. The Turku-born lawyer, member of parliament and government minister was one of the most notable politicians in the early years of Finland's independence. He was dedicated to justice, equality among citizens, and a unified nation.

Defending these values took a great deal of courage in the unstable times following the Finnish Civil War, when radical groups sought their own ends by any means necessary. Ritavuori was frightened of neither the extreme left-wing nor the extreme right, but instead implemented the reforms he felt were necessary as K.J. Ståhlberg's most trusted man. He took particular care in defending the civil rights of red prisoners of war kept in prison camps, and advocated laws to pardon them.

Ritavuori was already familiar with social questions when he became Secretary of the Foundation Board of the Parliament of Finland in 1907; he was especially interested in land-owning rights and the position of peasants. As a lawyer, he liked to handle communal cases in defense of the poor. He was elected as a member of the parliament from the Turku Province southern election circle first in 1913, and then again in 1919.

The acceptance of Finland's republican form of government in June 1919 is largely because of Ritavuori's work as chairman of the Foundation Board. The dispute about the form of government between the royalists and the republicans had been holding back governmental activity for months. To stop the unhelpful "temporary situation", the republican government of Kaarlo Castrén proposed a law establishing the new form to the Parliament of Finland in June; it was written by the President of the High Court, K.J. Ståhlberg.

For the parliament to be able to accept the proposed law, it had to be classified as urgent by the meeting order. One vote more was needed for the required five-sixths majority, and so the reform of the government was about to be delayed again. It was then that Heikki Ritavuori involved himself in the matter, and only a couple of days later he gave his own proposal for a new governmental form (which he had already submitted for consideration earlier) to the parliament. The members of the parliament were amazed, but now the proposal was classified as urgent, and based on it, the parliament accepted the new form of government on 21 June 1919. Thus, Finland became a republic.

Ritavuori, having served as Minister of Internal Affairs twice, was frequently confronted by activists representing the extreme right-wing. Because of the laws to pardon red prisoners of war, he was branded the "red minister", one who threatened the legacy of white Finland. Supporting Ståhlberg as the opponent of Carl Gustaf Emil Mannerheim in the presidential elections in summer 1919 and opposing the independence of the protection guards in the crisis of 1921 made Ritavuori even less liked in right-wing circles.

== Assassination ==
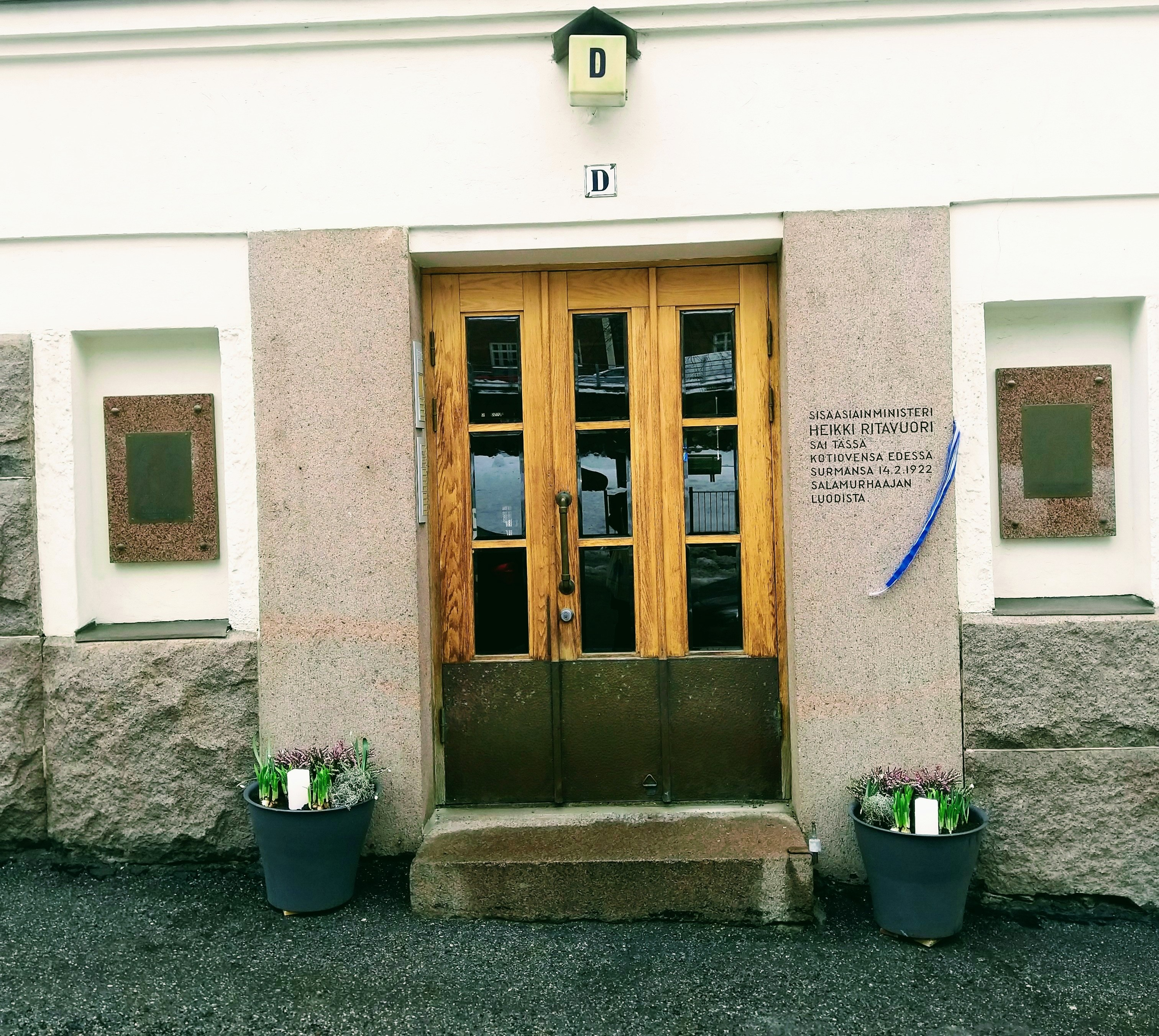
Murder place at Nervanderinkatu 11 D in Helsinki

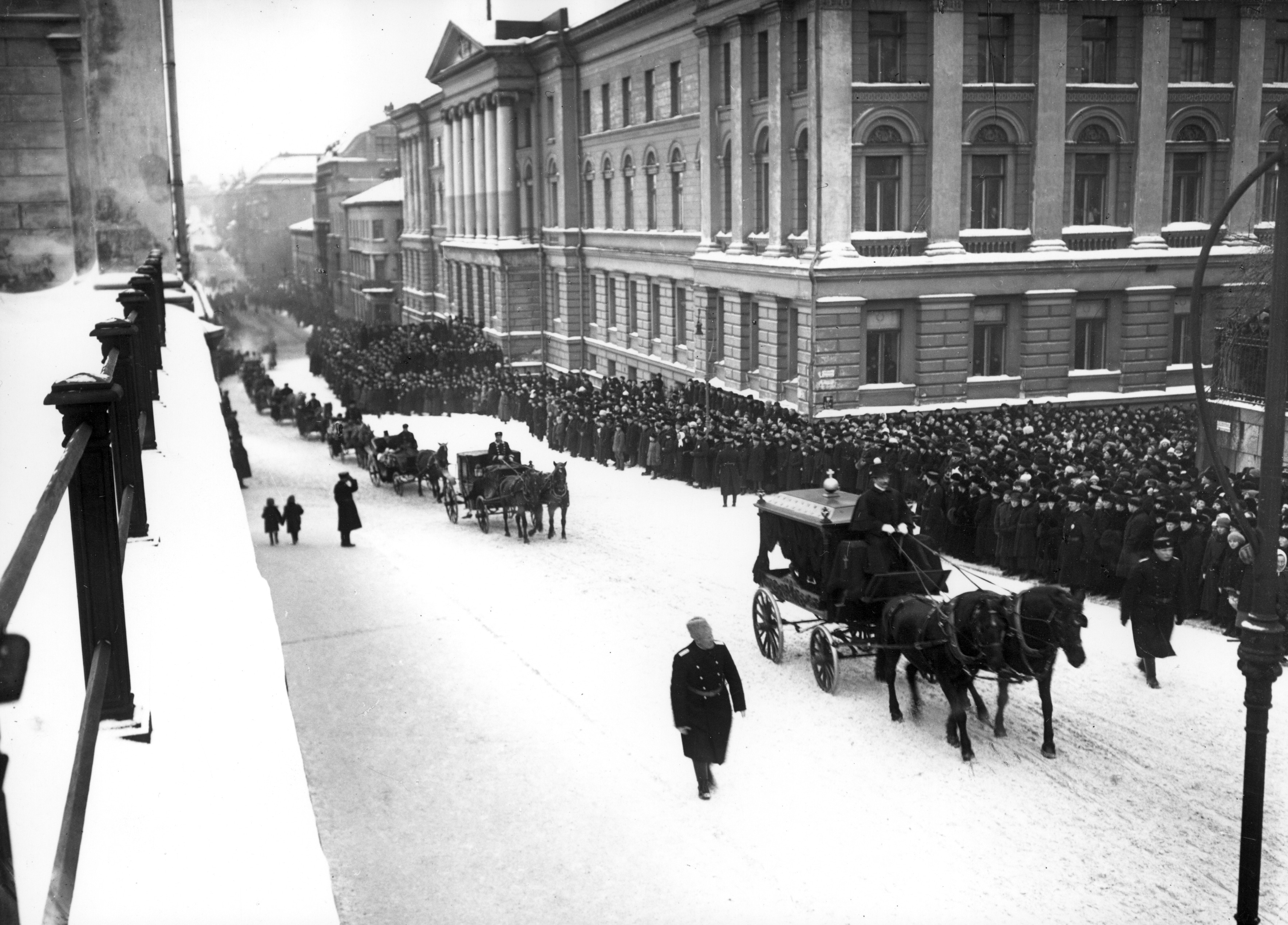
Funeral of Heikki Ritavuori

Ritavuori's fate was sealed by the East Karelian uprising in the winter of 1921–22, when he served as minister responsible for the border guard and handled his job in a direct manner as instructed by President of Finland K.J. Ståhlberg. Based on falsified news sent from Eastern Karelia, right-wing newspapers started a smear campaign that destroyed Ritavuori's reputation and eventually caused his death. Heikki Ritavuori was shot dead at his home in Etu-Töölö, at Nervanderinkatu 11, on 14 February 1922.

At about 4:30 PM on 14 February 1922, a strange-looking man had attracted attention at a barbershop in Kallio by exclaiming that minister Ritavuori would be shot at 5:00 PM, after which president Kaarlo Juho Ståhlberg and foreign minister Rudolf Holsti would meet the same fate.

At about 5:00 PM, minister Ritavuori had been walking to his home on Nervanderinkatu in Etu-Töölö followed by editor of newspaper Uusi Suomi Ernst Nevanlinna, who had business to attend to in the same building where Ritavuori lived. Ritavuori was just reaching for the handle of the front door when someone shouted Sisäministeri! (Finnish for "interior minister") and fired four shots at him. Minister Ritavuori fell to the ground in front of his home door.

The assassin tried to escape, but Nevanlinna was able to grab him and call the police. The assassin surrendered to the police immediately. According to schoolboy Lothar Czarnecki who was witness to the events, the assassin said "It was Ritavuori, and you probably understand why." The assassin identified himself as Ernst Tandefelt and took full responsibility for his actions. Tandefelt had fired four shots, of which three had hit minister Ritavuori. The first shot had hit Tandefelt's own leg as he had accidentally fired the gun while it was still in his pocket. This gunshot wound slowed down Tandefelt's escape allowing Nevanlinna to catch him.

Ernst Tandefelt, who had fired the murder weapon, was a mentally underdeveloped black sheep of a noble family. He stated that based on newspaper reports, and particularly Hufvudstadsbladet information supporting Swedish-speaking activists, he had concluded that Ritavuori was indeed a danger to the country, and thought he had to be eliminated. In court, Tandefelt said he had acted alone, and he was sentenced to 12 years of hard labor as partially legally insane. Afterwards, Tandefelt implicated several people, including the pharmacist Oskar Jansson and the general-major Paul von Gerich, who he said were involved in planning the murder. Research done by the chancellor of justice in 1927-30 did not result in any evidence that would have caused further actions in the matter. The decision was an understandable solution in the increasingly right-wing atmosphere of the time. However, many facts pointed to the theory that the initiative-less Tandefelt was supported by, if not a full conspiracy, then at least radical political actors, mostly Finland-Swedish Civil Guard activists, who encouraged Tandefelt to kill Ritavuori by giving him the murder weapon and some money.

== Other notes ==
Heikki Ritavuori, only 41 years old at the time of his death, was a heavy-duty government figure whom several parties saw as a potential new president.

Heikki Ritavuori fennicised his name in 1905. His younger brother Eero Rydman was a member of parliament from the Progressive Party, the mayor of Helsinki for 12 years, and a presidential candidate of the People's Party of Finland in 1956. Ritavuori's grandson, professor Pekka Tarjanne, was the chairman of the Liberal People's Party, a member of the parliament, a government minister, chairman of the board of the Post and Telephone Bureau, and chairman of the board of the ITU.

== Literature ==
- Niku, Risto: Ministeri Ritavuoren murha. Helsinki: Edita Publishing Oy, 2004. ISBN 951-37-4146-X.
- Hänninen, Timo: Myytti poliittisesta murhasta. 1995. Master's Thesis, University of Helsinki Faculty of Governmental Sciences.
- Silenti, Tuomo: Ritavuoren murha. 1995. Master's Thesis, University of Helsinki Faculty of History.
