= Ilmari Auer =

Finnish politician

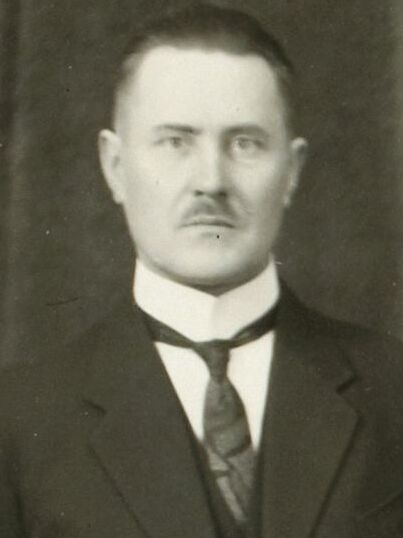
Ilmari Auer

Ilmari Auer (until 1895 Tappura; February 17, 1879 – July 13, 1965) was a Finnish politician and farmer.

Auer was a member of the Parliament of Finland from 1919 to 1922 and 1924 to 1927, representing the National Progressive Party. He was again in the Parliament from 1929 to 1930, this time representing the Agrarian Party. On all three occasions, Auer was elected from the constituency of Uusimaa Province. He was 2nd Minister of Agriculture in the cabinet of Lauri Ingman in 1924 and became Minister of Agriculture after the Agrarian Party withdrew from the cabinet.

Auer was born in Lempäälä. He became an agronomist in Denmark in 1904 and obtained a master's degree in Finland 1910. He lived as a farmer in Tuusula from 1909–1914 and 1926–1963, in rural Helsinki from 1910–1916 and in Jaala from 1916–1926. He married Rauha Malina Siimes in 1919. He died on July 13, 1965, in Helsinki, aged 86.
