= Cajander I cabinet =

8th Government of the Republic of Finland (1922)

Cajander I Cabinet
- 8th Cabinet of Finland
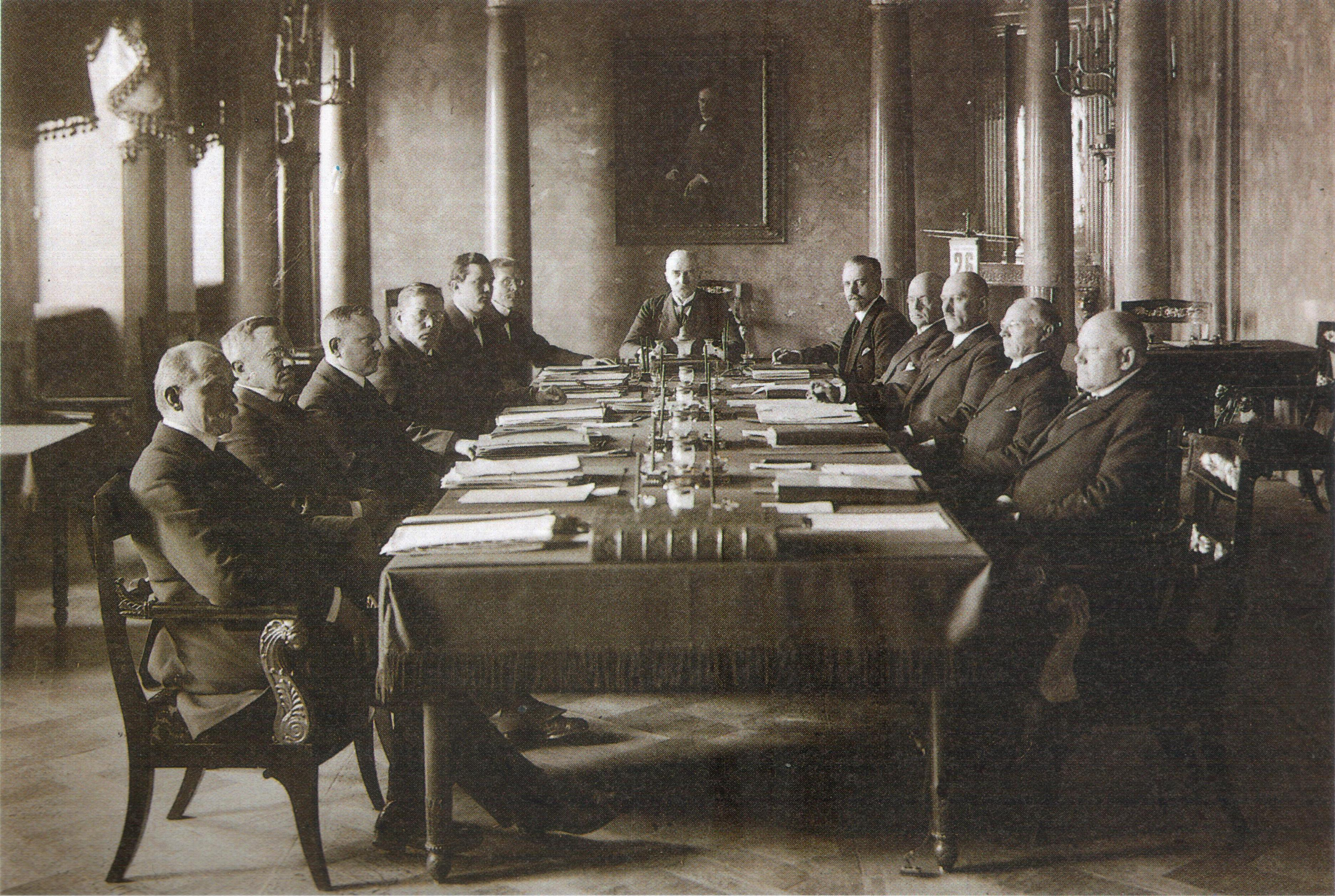
- A. K. Cajander's First Board of Civil Servants. At the head of the table is President K. J. Ståhlberg, to his left is Prime Minister Aimo Cajander
- Date formed: 2 June 1922
- Date dissolved: 14 November 1922

People and organisations
- Prime Minister: Aimo Cajander
- Total no. of members: 11
- Status in legislature: Caretaker government

History
- Predecessor: Vennola II
- Successor: Kallio I

Aimo Kaarlo Cajander's first cabinet was the eighth Government of Republic of Finland. Its time period was from June 2, 1922 to November 14, 1922. It was a caretaker government.

Assembly
Minister	Period of office	Party
Prime Minister; Aimo Kaarlo Cajander	June 2, 1922 – November 14, 1922	Independent
Minister for Foreign Affairs; Carl Enckell	June 2, 1922 – November 14, 1922	Independent
Minister of Justice; Oskar Lilius	June 2, 1922 – November 14, 1922	Independent
Minister of Defence; Bruno Jalander	June 2, 1922 – November 14, 1922	Independent
Minister of the Interior; Yrjö Johannes Eskelä	June 2, 1922 – November 14, 1922	Independent
Minister of Finance; Ernst Gråsten	June 2, 1922 – November 14, 1922	Independent
Minister of Education; Yrjö Loimaranta	June 2, 1922 – November 14, 1922	Independent
Minister of Agriculture; Östen Elfving	June 2, 1922 – November 14, 1922	Independent
Deputy Minister of Agriculture; Aimo Kaarlo Cajander	June 2, 1922 – November 14, 1922	Independent
Minister of Transport and Public Works; Evert Skogström	June 2, 1922 – November 14, 1922	Independent
Minister of Trade and Industry; Aukusti Aho	June 2, 1922 – November 14, 1922	Independent
Minister of Social Affairs; Eino Akseli Kuusi	June 2, 1922 – November 14, 1922	Independent

Preceded by Vennola II	Government of Finland; June 2, 1922 – November 14, 1922	Succeeded by Kallio I
