= Johannes Lundson =

Finnish politician (1867–1939)

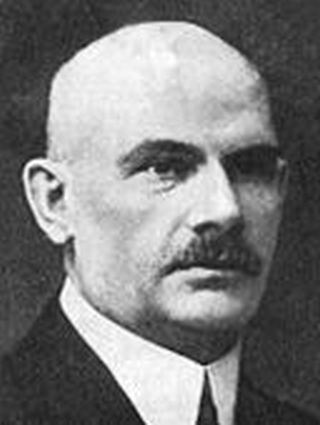
Johannes Lundson

Johannes Lundson (12 October 1867 – 11 August 1939) was a Finnish politician of the Young Finnish Party and National Progressive Party. He was born in Leppävirta. Lundson was the Speaker of the Parliament in 1917 and was chairing the session on 6 December 1917 when the declaration of independence was approved. Additionally, he served as Minister of Finance from August 1919 to March 1920. He died in Salo, aged 71.

Political offices
| Preceded by Kullervo Manner | Speaker of the Parliament of Finland; 1917 | Succeeded by Lauri Ingman |
