= Cajander II cabinet =

Government of Finland (1924)

Cajander II Cabinet
- 10th Cabinet of Finland
- Date formed: 18 January 1924
- Date dissolved: 31 May 1924

People and organisations
- Prime Minister: Aimo Cajander
- Total no. of members: 11
- Status in legislature: Caretaker government

History
- Predecessor: Kallio I
- Successor: Ingman II

Aimo Cajander's second cabinet was the 10th Government of Finland. The cabinet existed from January 18, 1924 to May 31, 1924. It was a caretaker government, and its prime minister was Aimo Cajander.

== Ministers ==
Portfolio	Minister	In office	Left office	Party
Prime Minister	Aimo Cajander	January 18, 1924	May 31, 1924	none
Minister for Foreign Affairs	Carl Enckell	January 18, 1924	May 31, 1924	none
Minister of Justice	Oskar Lilius	January 18, 1924	May 31, 1924	none
Minister of Defence	Viktor Henrik Schvindt	November 14, 1922	January 18, 1924	none
Minister of Defence	Ivar Aminoff	March 11, 1924	May 31, 1924	none
Minister of the Interior	Yrjö Johannes Eskelä	January 18, 1924	May 31, 1924	none
Minister of Finance	Hugo Relander	January 18, 1924	May 31, 1924	none
Minister of Education	Yrjö Loimaranta	January 18, 1924	May 31, 1924	none
Minister of Agriculture	Östen Elfving	January 18, 1924	May 31, 1924	none
Minister of Transport and Public Works	Evert Skogström	January 18, 1924	May 31, 1924	none
Minister of Trade and Industry	Hjalmar Procopé	January 18, 1924	May 31, 1924	none
Minister of Social Affairs	Einar Böök	January 18, 1924	May 31, 1924	none

Preceded by Kallio I	Government of Finland; January 18, 1924–May 31, 1924	Succeeded by Ingman II
