= Lauri Pohjala =

Finnish Lutheran theologian, educator and politician (1870–1947)

Lauri Pohjala (22 July 1870 – 30 January 1947) was a Finnish Lutheran theologian, educator and politician, born in Isokyrö. He was a member of the Parliament of Finland from 1924 to 1927, representing the National Coalition Party. He served as Minister of Social Affairs from 22 November 1924 to 31 March 1925.
