= Rudolf Holsti =

Finnish politician, journalist and diplomat

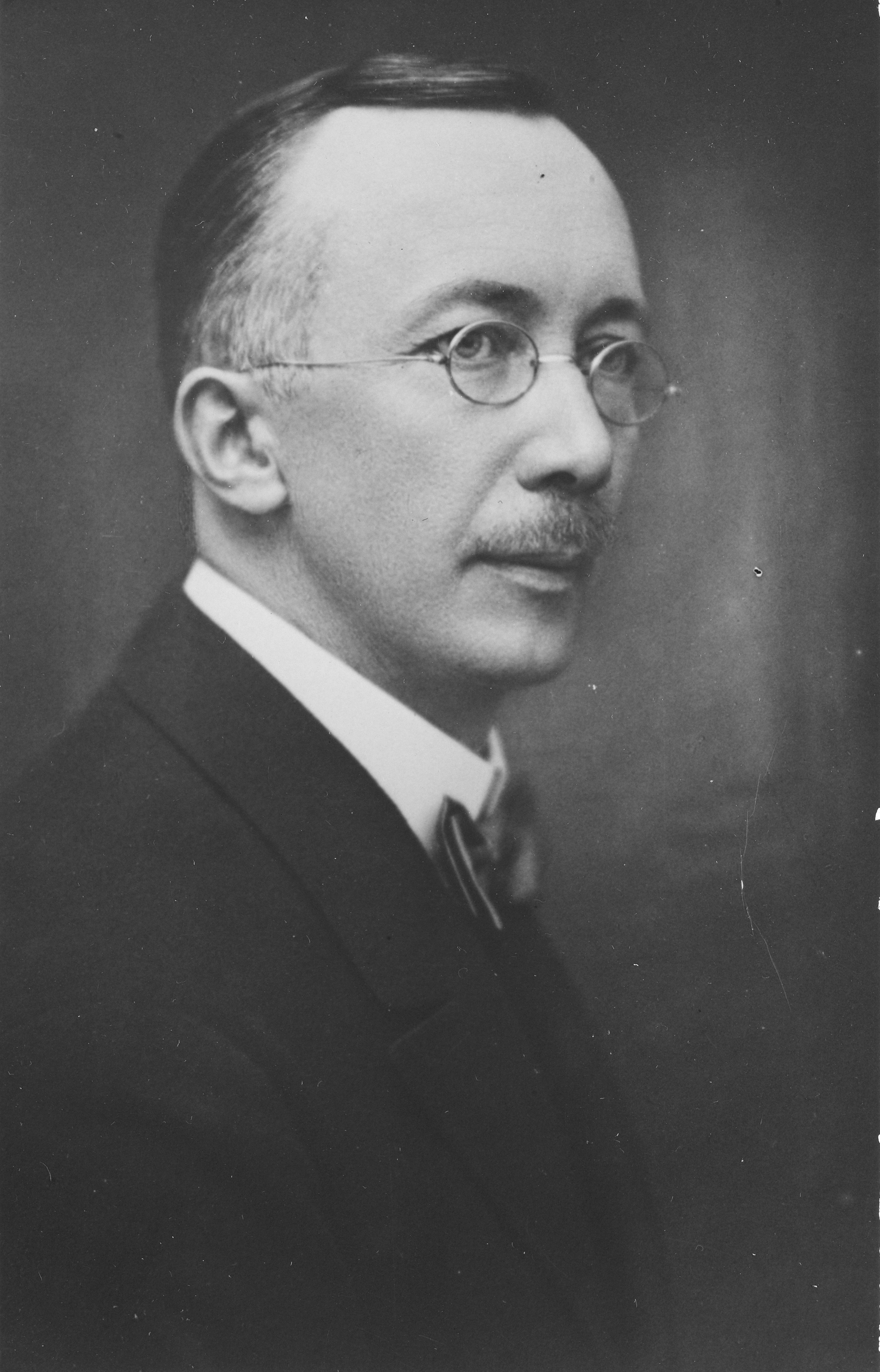

Minister of Foreign Affairs
- In office 7 October 1936 – 16 November 1938
- Prime Minister: Kyösti Kallio; Aimo Cajander
- Preceded by: Antti Hackzell
- Succeeded by: Väinö Voionmaa
- In office 28 April 1919 – 2 June 1922
- Prime Minister: Kaarlo Castrén; Juho Vennola; Rafael Erich
- Preceded by: Carl Enckell
- Succeeded by: Carl Enckell

Personal details
- Born: Eino Rudolf Woldemar Holsti; 8 October 1881 Jyväskylä, Finland
- Died: 3 August 1945 (aged 63) Palo Alto, California, U. S
- Party: National Progressive

Eino Rudolf Woldemar Holsti (8 October 1881 in Jyväskylä – 3 August 1945 in Palo Alto, California) was a Finnish politician, journalist and diplomat. He was the Minister of Foreign Affairs in 1919–1922 and in 1936–1938 and a member of the Finnish Parliament in 1913–1918 representing the Young Finnish Party (Nuorsuomalainen Puolue).

== Biography ==
From 1919 he represented the National Progressive Party. Holsti represented Finland in the League of Nations. He was also a republican (opposing the then ongoing movement for monarchy in Finland). A firm supporter of democracy, he openly criticized Adolf Hitler at the outbreak of war. He held a pro-British political stance. Holsti worked for newspapers in Hämeenlinna, Lahti and Helsinki together with his friend and school companion Joel Lehtonen. The friendship ended abruptly when Holsti recognized himself as the satirically portrayed and fictive politician Rolf Idell in Lehtonen's book Sorron lapset (1924). Holsti was also Envoy to Estonia from 1923 to 1927.

Later in life, Holsti taught at Stanford University, after he moved to United States with his two sons: Kalevi and Olavi Holsti (both respected political scientists in their own right). He maintained a healthy correspondence with president Herbert Hoover, and the prime minister and president of Finland. He died on 3 August 1945 at Palo Alto Hospital while undergoing surgery to repair a hernia. His wife Liisa died of tuberculosis on 22 July 1951.

== Honorary degrees ==
- Temple University, Philadelphia, USA (PhD. h.c) in 1938

Political offices
Preceded by Carl Enckell	Foreign Minister of Finland; 1919–1922	Succeeded by Carl Enckell
Preceded by Antti Hackzell	Foreign Minister of Finland; 1936–1938	Succeeded by Väinö Voionmaa
