= Carl Enckell =

Finnish politician (1876–1959)

Carl Johan Alexis Enckell
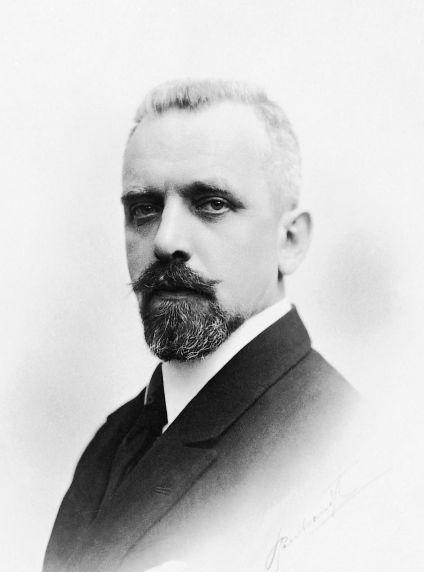
- Born: 7 June 1876; Saint Petersburg, Russian Empire
- Died: 26 March 1959 (aged 82); Helsinki, Finland
- Education: Dresden University of Technology
- Board member of: see → board memberships
- Children: Maria Felicitas Erna Julia Pauline Helena (Maritta), married Schalin (1911–2002); Carl Fredrik Ralph Alexander (1913–2001); Estelle Tatjana Lucy Sigrid Helena (b. 1914); Bernard Carl Johan Armas Berndt Gérard (b. 1920)
- Awards: see → awards
- Military career
- Allegiance: Russian Empire
- Branch: Infantry
- Service years: 1896–99
- Rank: ensign
- Unit: Izmaylovsky Regiment

Manager of Kone- ja Siltarakennus
- In office 1911–1917
- Preceded by: Karl Söderman
- Succeeded by: Julius Stjernvall

Minister of Foreign Affairs Ingman I Cabinet ^{(27 Nov 1918 – 17 April 1919)} K. Castrén Cabinet ^{(17 Apr 1919 – 28 April 1919)} Cajander I Cabinet ^{(2 June 1922 – 14 November 1922)} Cajander II Cabinet ^{(18 Jan 1924 – 31 May 1924)} Hackzell Cabinet ^{(8 Aug 1944 – 21 September 1944)} U. Castrén Cabinet ^{(21 Sep 1944 – 17 November 1944)} Paasikivi II Cabinet ^{(17 Nov 1944 – 17 April 1945)} Paasikivi III Cabinet ^{(17 Apr 1945 – 26 March 1946)} Pekkala Cabinet ^{(26 Mar 1946 – 29 July 1948)} Fagerholm I Cabinet ^{(29 July 1948 – 17 March 1950)}

Carl Johan Alexis Enckell (7 June 1876 – 26 March 1959) was a Finnish politician, diplomat, officer and industrialist, regarded as one of Finland's leading foreign policy figures during the first half of the 20th century.

Before entering diplomacy, Enckell built a career as a mechanical engineer and industrial manager, eventually becoming managing director of a Helsinki engineering firm in 1911. During the 1910s he was also active in employers' organisations, representing Finnish industry in economic negotiations with the Russian imperial authorities.

In 1917, following the February Revolution, Enckell was appointed Finnish Minister–Secretary of State to Saint Petersburg, where he played a direct role in securing Bolshevik recognition of Finnish independence. He served as Foreign Minister in 1918–1919 and was subsequently appointed Finnish envoy to Paris, a post he held from 1919 to 1927 with brief returns to the Foreign Ministry in 1922 and 1924. As envoy, he led the Finnish delegation at the Paris Peace Conference, 1919 and represented Finland at the League of Nations, where he successfully managed the Åland crisis to a resolution favourable to Finland in 1921.

Enckell moved to the financial sector in the late 1920s but returned to politics as Foreign Minister in 1944. He led Finland out of the Second World War, signed the Paris peace treaty on behalf of Finland in February 1947, and contributed to shaping the Paasikivi–Kekkonen doctrine of Finnish foreign policy.

Enckell was married to German-born Lucy Ponsonby-Lyons. They had four children, of whom Ralph Enckell became a notable diplomat.

== Early life and military service ==
Enckell was born into the Finnish cultural Enckell family, which traces its origins to Germany. Carl Enckell was born and spent his first seven years in Saint Petersburg. A Finland Swede with Swedish as his mother tongue, he came from a military family; both his father, Carl Enckell Sr., and his paternal grandfather Carl Gustaf Enckell had served as officers. His father served for 30 years in the Imperial Russian Army before returning to the Grand Duchy of Finland, where he took charge of the Hamina Cadet School. Enckell studied at the cadet school, which was at the time managed by his father, graduating in 1896 as ensign and best of his class. He was assigned to the Izmaylovsky Regiment of the Imperial Russian Guard.

== Engineering career ==
Salaries in the military had stayed behind those in business and industry, and in 1899 Enckell began engineering studies at Dresden University of Technology in Germany. After three years he graduated as a mechanical engineer in 1902 and returned to Finland with his German wife Lucy Ponsonby-Lyons.

During 1903–1905 Enckell worked at the Kuusankoski paper mill as supervisor and chief engineer. In 1905 he moved to Helsinki and started working for the Hietalahti Shipyard and Engineering Works, where he stayed until he obtained a deputy director position at Kone- ja Siltarakennus in 1907. In 1911 he was appointed managing director of the company.

Enckell established his reputation as a successful industrial leader during periods of high demand in the metals industry – first during the Russo-Japanese War, and later during the First World War, when Finnish metal companies supplied the Russian war machine with torpedo boats and other military materiel.

During 1912–1917 Enckell was also active in employers' organisations, serving as deputy director of the Finnish General Employers' Federation and the Finnish Engineering Industry Employers' Federation. He took part in economic and political negotiations between the Grand Duchy of Finland and the Russian Empire in 1913–1915, representing Finnish industry and resisting the proposed Russian uniform tariff policy which would have weakened the competitiveness of Finnish companies against Russian ones.

During 1911–1914 Enckell also served on Helsinki City Council.

== Early diplomatic career ==
In 1917 he was appointed Finnish Minister–Secretary of State to Saint Petersburg. In this capacity he dissolved parliament in the summer of 1917, when Finland had unilaterally adopted the so-called Power Act. Following the Bolshevik Revolution, the Finnish senate declared itself the highest authority in Finland, and Enckell worked to persuade foreign governments and the Bolshevik leadership to support the Finnish pursuit of independence. On 6 December 1917 the senate declared Finland a sovereign country. On 31 December 1917 Enckell received from Vladimir Bonch-Bruyevich, Secretary General of the Council of People's Commissars, a letter in which the Council recognised Finnish independence. Regent of Finland Pehr Evind Svinhufvud, who had been in Saint Petersburg awaiting the recognition, carried the letter home to Finland on New Year's night, while Enckell remained in the city. On 4 January 1918 Enckell received the final confirmation: the Soviet central committee had ratified the decision. The recognition by France, Germany and the Scandinavian countries followed shortly after.

Experience in foreign affairs was scarce in the newly independent Finland; Enckell was in practice the only person the Senate could call upon with any relevant background, though even his experience was limited to his brief period as Minister-Secretary of State. He served as Foreign Minister in Lauri Ingman's cabinet 1918–1919, after which he was appointed Finnish envoy to Paris.

== Envoy to Paris and the Åland question ==
As envoy, Enckell's first task was to lead Finland's delegation in the peace negotiations that followed the First World War, during which Finland sought to distance itself from Germany and secure recognition for its independence from the Allies. Finland also sought support in the Åland crisis that had emerged with Sweden, which demanded the group of islands to itself. Enckell led the Finnish delegation in peace negotiations in Paris in 1919.

The League of Nations processed the Åland question in 1920–1921. According to historian Cecilia af Forselles, Finland's success rested on three converging factors: Enckell's lobbying and information campaign; favourable international circumstances, notably the fall of the Swedish government in autumn 1920; and the desire of the Allied powers to keep Finland amenable with a view to a potential intervention against Bolshevik Russia. Enckell employed a deliberate strategy of delay, repeatedly postponing a final decision for as long as international sympathies favoured the right of minority peoples to self-determination – and thus the islands' incorporation into Sweden. The strategy ultimately led to a compromise in 1921: Finnish sovereignty over Åland was recognised, and the islands received guarantees of nationality protection and self-governance. After managing complicated political questions successfully in Saint Petersburg, Paris and the League of Nations, Enckell became reputable for his excellent diplomatic skills.

Enckell returned as Foreign Minister in two short-lived cabinets led by A. K. Cajander in 1922 and 1924. After each of these terms, President Ståhlberg invited Enckell to remain in the post, but Enckell declined, citing his self-image as an apolitical professional expert rather than a politician.

During his Paris years, Enckell consistently advocated for Finland's integration into Western Europe, seeing the League of Nations as the primary instrument for securing the country's safety. He was markedly pro-French, considering France to be the only great power without its own military interests in the Baltic region.

== Career in the financial sector ==
Enckell left the diplomatic service in 1927. The official reason given was his wish to secure a Finnish education for his children; probable underlying factors also included frustration over the language dispute of the era – he had been criticised for writing his diplomatic reports in Swedish rather than Finnish – and dissatisfaction with the political system's handling of his counsel. He moved into banking, becoming deputy director of Liittopankki. After a merger with Helsingin Osakepankki (HOP) in 1931, he became a board member in HOP. In 1936 Enckell became the managing director of Industrialists' Mutual Fire Insurance Company. Enckell took part again in activities in employers' organisations and worked in positions of trust in a number of Finnish companies.

== Foreign Minister, 1944–1950 ==
In the summer of 1944, following the election of C. G. Mannerheim as president during the ongoing war, Enckell was appointed Foreign Minister in Antti Hackzell's peace cabinet, with the principal task of securing an end to hostilities with the Soviet Union. He was sent to peace negotiations in Moscow to replace the head of the Finnish delegation, prime minister Hackzell, who had fallen seriously ill. As an outcome, Finland signed the Moscow Armistice which ended the Continuation War between Finland and the Soviet Union. Enckell took part in the Paris peace conference in August and September 1946 and on 10 February 1947 he signed the Paris peace treaty as chairman of the Finnish delegation.

After the Second World War, and having formally left his insurance company directorship in 1946, he took part in structuring a new pragmatic role for Finland in global politics. The policy, later known as the Paasikivi–Kekkonen doctrine, was based on the geopolitical fact that Finland was a neighbour to a superpower and did not have powerful allies. In 1948 Enckell took part in negotiations with the Soviet Union, after which the countries signed the Agreement of Friendship, Cooperation, and Mutual Assistance, that became a cornerstone of Finnish foreign policy until the early 1990s.

Enckell retired in March 1950, after serving as Foreign Minister for six consecutive years. During his career he served a grand total of 2,502 days as foreign minister.

== Personal life ==
In 1903 Enckell was married to German-born Lucy Marie Frieda Agathe Margareta Ponsonby-Lyons (1875–1945). The couple had two daughters and two sons who were born between 1911–1920. The younger son, Ralph Enckell, became a notable diplomat.

Enckell bought Eriksnäs Mansion in Sipoo in 1916 and used it as his summer residence. During his diplomacy years in Paris he started collecting historical maps of Northern Europe and Russia; the collection is currently kept in Helsinki University Library.

== Board memberships ==
- Finnish General Employers' Federation
- Finnish Engineering Industry Employers' Federation
- Domestic Work Association
- Helsingin Osakepankki (1931–1936)
- Industrialists' Mutual Fire Insurance Company (1936–1946)
- Oy Aga Ab (1939–)
- Wärtsilä Group (1945–1949)

== Awards ==
- Cross of Liberty, 1st Class (1919)
- Commander of the White Rose of Finland, 1st class (1919)
- Grand Cross of the White Rose of Finland (1921)
- Cross of Liberty, 1st Class with a grand star (1944)
- Grand Cross of the White Rose of Finland with Collar (1946)
- Grand Cross of the Dannebrog (Denmark; 1919)
- Grand Cross of Vasa (Sweden; 1919)
- Commander of the Legion of Honour (France; 1920)
- Cross of Liberty, 1st Class (Estonia; 1922)
- Grand Cross of the Crown of Belgium (Belgium; 1924)
- Grand Officer of the Legion of Honour (France; 1926)
- Grand Cross of the Falcon of Iceland (Iceland; 1949)
- Grand Cross of Polonia Restituta (Poland; 1927)
