= Albert von Hellens =

Finnish jurist and politician (1879–1950)

Minister of Justice
- In office 1924–1925
- In office 1922–1922

Minister of Interior
- In office 1920–1921
- Prime Minister: Rafael Erich

Personal details
- Born: Albert Alexander von Hellens; 22 November 1879 Helsinki, Grand Duchy of Finland
- Died: 2 April 1950 (aged 70) Turku, Finland
- Spouse: Maja Oihonna of Ursin
- Occupation: Jurist

Albert von Hellens (1879–1950) was a Finnish lawyer and jurist who served as the Finnish minister of interior and minister of justice in the 1920s. Being a member of the von Hellens noble family he also headed the Court of Appeal of Turku.

== Early life ==
Von Hellens was born in Helsinki on 22 November 1879. His parents were Lars Theodor von Hellens and Johanna Maria Augusta of Heurlin.

== Career ==
Following his graduation, von Hellens worked as the secretary of the judicial institution in Turku between 1903 and 1918. In 1917 he was named as the governor of Turku and Björneborg which he held for one year. He was also governor of the Kuopio county in the same period. From 1919 to 1930 he was the governor of Tavastehus county.

In 1917 von Hellens joined the National Progress Party. Between 1920 and 1921 he was the minister of interior. In 1922 he was named as the minister of justice which he also held from 1924 to 1925. In 1930 he was appointed president of the Court of Appeal of Turku and remained in the post until his retirement in 1949.

== Personal life and death ==
Von Hellens married Maja Oihonna of Ursin in 1903. He died in Turku on 2 April 1950.

=== Awards ===
Von Hellens was the recipient of the Order of the Lion of Finland.
