= Erkki Pullinen =

Finnish politician

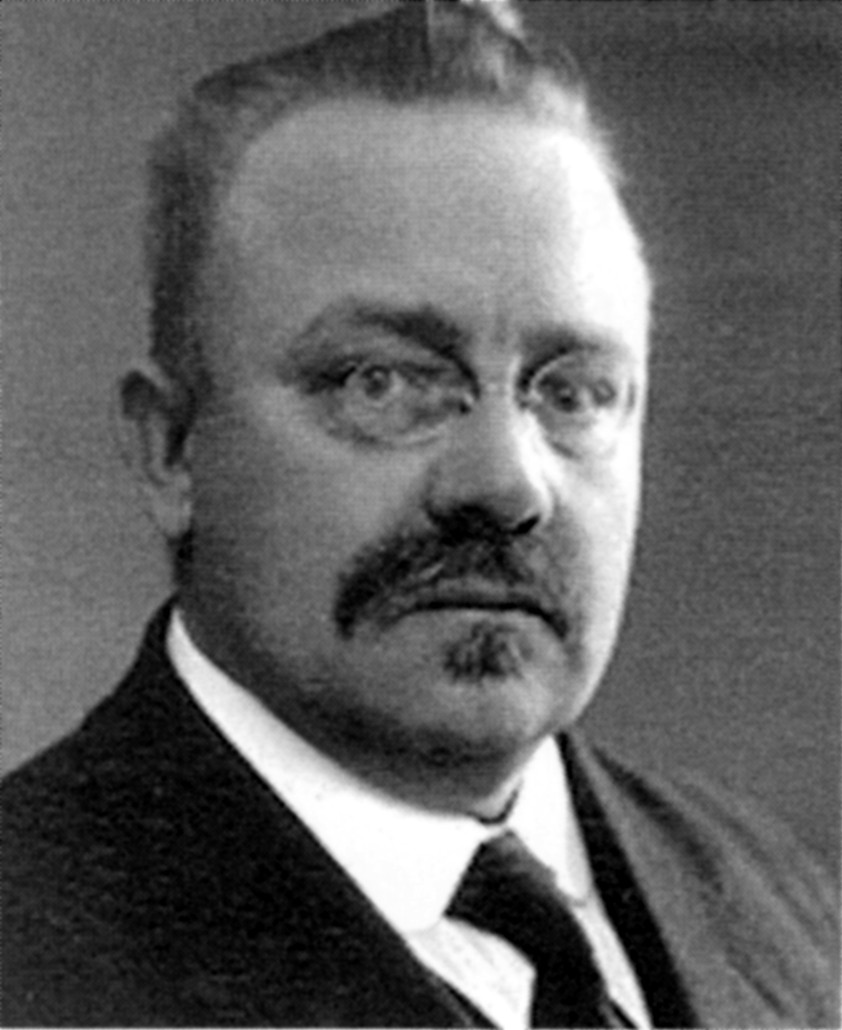
Erkki Pullinen

Erik (Erkki) Pullinen (6 June 1871, Antrea - 20 November 1934) was a Finnish farmer and politician. He served as Minister of Transport and Public Works from 9 April 1921 to 2 June 1922 and as Minister of Trade and Industry from 14 November 1922 to 18 January 1924. He was a member of the Parliament of Finland, representing the Finnish Party from 1907 to 1916, the People's Party from 1917 to 1918, the National Progressive Party from 1918 to 1919 and from 1922 to 1927 and finally the Agrarian League from 1930 to 1933.
