= Vilkku Joukahainen =

Finnish schoolteacher, journalist, poet and politician (1879–1929)

Vilhelm (Vilkku) Joukahainen (19 April 1879 – 27 March 1929; original surname Seppä) was a Finnish schoolteacher, journalist, poet and politician, born in Vehkalahti. He was a member of the Parliament of Finland from 1917 to 1924, representing the Agrarian League (ML). He served as Minister of Social Affairs from 15 March 1920 to 2 June 1922 and from 31 March to 31 December 1925 and as Minister of the Interior from 14 November 1922 to 18 January 1924. He was a presidential elector in the 1925 Finnish presidential election.
