= Lauri Ingman =

Finnish theologian and politician (1868–1934)

The Most Reverend Lauri Ingman
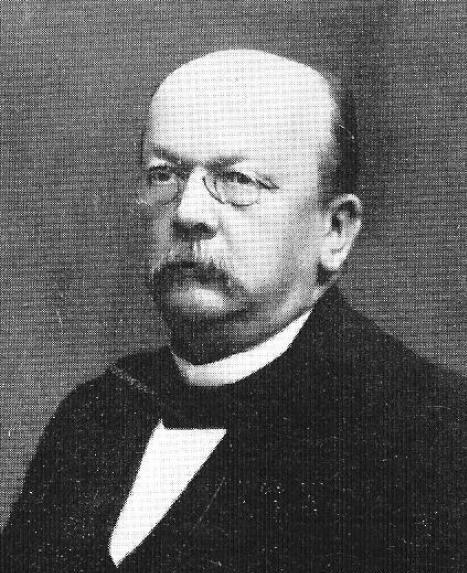

Archbishop of Turku
- In office 1930–1934
- Preceded by: Gustaf Johansson
- Succeeded by: Erkki Kaila

3rd Prime Minister of Finland
- In office 31 May 1924 – 31 March 1925
- President: Kaarlo Juho Ståhlberg; Lauri Kristian Relander
- Preceded by: Aimo Cajander
- Succeeded by: Antti Tulenheimo
- In office 27 November 1918 – 17 April 1919
- President: Kaarlo Juho Ståhlberg
- Preceded by: Juho Kusti Paasikivi
- Succeeded by: Kaarlo Castrén

Personal details
- Born: 30 June 1868 Teuva, Grand Duchy of Finland, Russian Empire
- Died: 25 October 1934 (aged 66) Turku, Finland
- Party: National Coalition Party

Lars (Lauri) Johannes Ingman (30 June 1868 – 25 October 1934) was a Finnish theologian, bishop and politician. He was born in Teuva. In 1906, he began to serve as the editor of Vartija, a Christian magazine. From 1916 to 1930, he was the professor of practical theology in the University of Helsinki. He was also a member of the conservative National Coalition Party, where he acted as the speaker of the parliament and a minister in several cabinets, and served as the Prime Minister of Finland twice, in 1918–1919 and 1924–1925. In 1930 he was elected Archbishop of Turku, head of the Evangelical Lutheran Church of Finland. He died in Turku.

== Cabinets ==
- Ingman I Cabinet
- Ingman II Cabinet

Political offices
Preceded by Johannes Lundson	Speaker of the Parliament of Finland; 1918	Succeeded by Ernst Nevanlinna
Preceded by Juho Kusti Paasikivi	Prime Minister of Finland; 1918–1919	Succeeded by Kaarlo Castrén
Preceded by Aimo Cajander	Prime Minister of Finland; 1924–1925	Succeeded by Antti Tulenheimo
Titles in Lutheranism
Preceded by Gustaf Johansson	Archbishop of Turku; 1930–1934	Succeeded by Erkki Kaila
