= Niilo Liakka =

Finnish politician

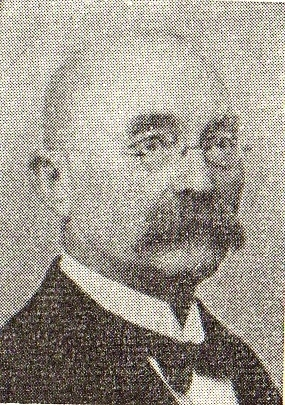
Niilo Liakka.

Niilo Liakka (23 June 1864 – 26 January 1945) was a Finnish educationist and politician, born in Alatornio. He served as Minister of Education from 9 April 1921 to 2 June 1922 and from 14 November 1922 to 18 January 1924 and as Minister of Social Affairs from 31 May to 22 November 1924. He was a member of the Parliament of Finland from 1919 to 1922, representing the Agrarian League.
