= Juho Vennola =

Finnish economist and politician (1872–1938)

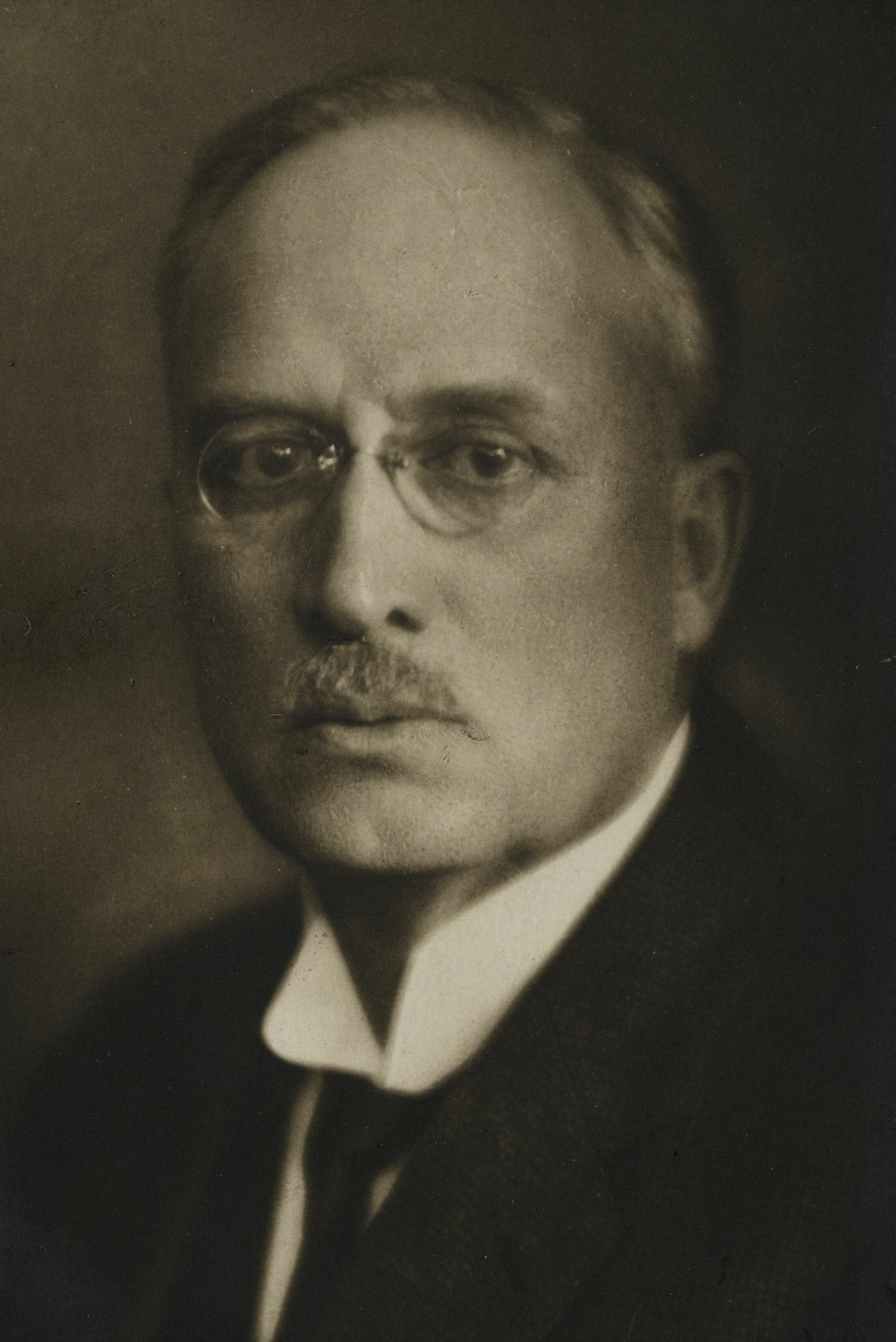

5th Prime Minister of Finland
- In office 9 April 1921 – 2 June 1922
- President: K. J. Ståhlberg
- Preceded by: Rafael Erich
- Succeeded by: Aimo Cajander
- In office 15 August 1919 – 15 March 1920
- President: K. J. Ståhlberg
- Preceded by: Kaarlo Castrén
- Succeeded by: Rafael Erich

Minister of Finance
- In office 4 July 1930 – 21 March 1931
- Prime Minister: P. E. Svinhufvud
- Preceded by: Tyko Reinikka
- Succeeded by: Kyösti Järvinen

Minister of Foreign Affairs
- In office 14 November 1922 – 18 January 1924
- Prime Minister: Kyösti Kallio
- Preceded by: Carl Enckell
- Succeeded by: Carl Enckell

Minister of Trade and Industry
- In office 17 April 1919 – 15 August 1919
- Prime Minister: Kaarlo Castrén
- Preceded by: Julius Stjernvall
- Succeeded by: Eero Erkko

Member of the Finnish Parliament
- In office 1 April 1919 – 20 October 1930
- Constituency: Uusimaa

Personal details
- Born: Juho Heikki Vennola; 19 June 1872 Oulu, Finland
- Died: 3 December 1938 (aged 66) Helsinki, Finland
- Party: National Progressive

Juho Heikki Vennola (originally Karhu, 19 June 1872 – 3 December 1938) was Professor of National Economics at the University of Helsinki, a member of the Parliament of Finland, and a politician from the National Progressive Party, who served as Prime Minister of Finland twice.

Vennola's first government was from 15 August 1919 to 15 March 1920 and his second one was from 9 April 1921 to 2 June 1922. He was also acting Prime Minister in the second government of Pehr Evind Svinhufvud from 18 February to 21 March 1931. He also served as Deputy Minister of Finance (1918–1919), Minister of Trade and Industry (1919), Minister of Foreign Affairs (1922–1924) and Minister of Finance (1930–1931).

Vennola, who was born in Oulu, served as a member of the parliament from 1919 to 1930 and was a member of the Tartu Board of Peace in 1920. He died in Helsinki, aged 66.

== Cabinets ==
- Vennola I Cabinet
- Vennola II Cabinet

Political offices
Preceded by Kaarlo Castrén	Prime Minister of Finland; 1919–1920	Succeeded by Rafael Erich
Preceded by Rafael Erich	Prime Minister of Finland; 1921–1922	Succeeded by Aimo Cajander
Preceded by Carl Enckell	Foreign Minister of Finland; 1922–1924	Succeeded by Carl Enckell
