= Rafael Erich =

Prime minister of Finland from 1920 to 1921

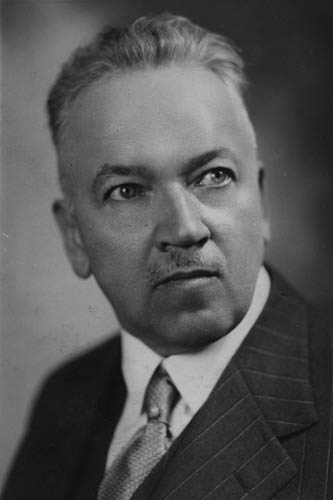

6th Prime Minister of Finland
- In office 15 March 1920 – 9 April 1921
- President: Kaarlo Juho Ståhlberg
- Preceded by: Juho Vennola
- Succeeded by: Juho Vennola

Personal details
- Born: 10 June 1879 Turku
- Died: 19 February 1946 (aged 66)
- Party: National Coalition Party
- Education: University of Helsinki
- Profession: lawyer

Rafael Waldemar Erich (10 June 1879 in Turku – 19 February 1946 in Helsinki) was a Finnish politician from the National Coalition Party, Professor, diplomat, and Prime Minister of Finland.

The sixth cabinet of the Republic of Finland, Erich's cabinet, lasted from 15 March 1920 to 9 April 1921 for a total of 391 days.

The most important function and accomplishment of Erich's cabinet was a peace treaty with the Russian SFSR. The peace treaty was made in Tartu, Estonia, on 14 October 1920. This was the time when the Russian SFSR finally completely recognised Finland's independence.

== Cabinets ==
Erich Cabinet

Political offices
Preceded by Juho Vennola	Prime Minister of Finland; 1920-1921	Succeeded by Juho Vennola
