= Aimo Cajander =

Prime minister of Finland variously between 1922 and 1939

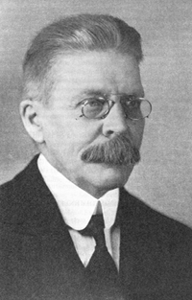

7th Prime Minister of Finland
- In office 2 June 1922 – 14 November 1922
- President: Kaarlo Juho Ståhlberg
- Preceded by: Juho Vennola
- Succeeded by: Kyösti Kallio
- In office 18 January 1924 – 31 May 1924
- President: Kaarlo Juho Ståhlberg
- Preceded by: Kyösti Kallio
- Succeeded by: Lauri Ingman
- In office 12 March 1937 – 1 December 1939
- President: Kyösti Kallio
- Preceded by: Kyösti Kallio
- Succeeded by: Risto Ryti

Personal details
- Born: 4 April 1879 Uusikaupunki
- Died: 21 January 1943 (aged 63)
- Party: National Progressive Party

Aimo Kaarlo Cajander (4 April 1879 – 21 January 1943) was the Prime Minister of Finland up to the Winter War.

Cajander was born in Uusikaupunki, and became a botanist, a professor of forestry 1911–34; director-general for Finland's Forest and Park Service 1934–1943; Prime Minister in 1922, 1924, and 1937–1939; chairman of the National Progressive Party 1933–1943; and Member of Parliament.

Cajander came into politics in 1922 when President Ståhlberg asked him to take office of prime minister. He had not earlier participated actively in politics. Ståhlberg invited him as prime minister second time in January 1924. Cajander's short-lived cabinets were merely caretakers before parliamentary elections.

Cajander joined in 1927 National Progressive Party and in 1928 he was chosen as Minister of Defence. Cajander was elected to the Parliament in 1929. When Kyösti Kallio was elected president in 1937, Cajander was asked as the chairman of the National Progressive Party to form majority government. Cajander formed a coalition government of the two largest parties in the parliament - Social Democrats and Agrarian League. Cajander was an idealist who did not yet believe in August 1939 that Soviet Union would attack Finland. Partly for this reason the Finnish Army was forced to fight while inadequately equipped. He died in Helsinki, aged 63.

Cajander's name is remembered for "Model Cajander", the fashion of many Finnish soldiers in Winter War: the army was poorly equipped, so mobilized reserves were given a utility belt, an emblem to be attached to the hat — to comply with the Hague Conventions; and a rifle. Otherwise, they had to use their own clothes and equipment.

== Cabinets ==
- Cajander I Cabinet
- Cajander II Cabinet
- Cajander III Cabinet

== Awards ==
- (Latvia) Order of the Three Stars, 1st Class (April 10, 1937)
- (Finland) Order of the Holy Lamb, Grand Cross (1941)
- Honorary doctorate of the University of Natural Resources and Life Sciences, Vienna (1924)

Political offices
| Preceded by Juho Vennola | Prime Minister of Finland; 1922 | Succeeded by Kyösti Kallio |
| Preceded by Kyösti Kallio | Prime Minister of Finland; 1924 | Succeeded by Lauri Ingman |
| Preceded by Kyösti Kallio | Prime Minister of Finland; 1937–1939 | Succeeded by Risto Ryti |
