= Kaarlo Juho Ståhlberg =

Finnish politician and academic (1865–1952)

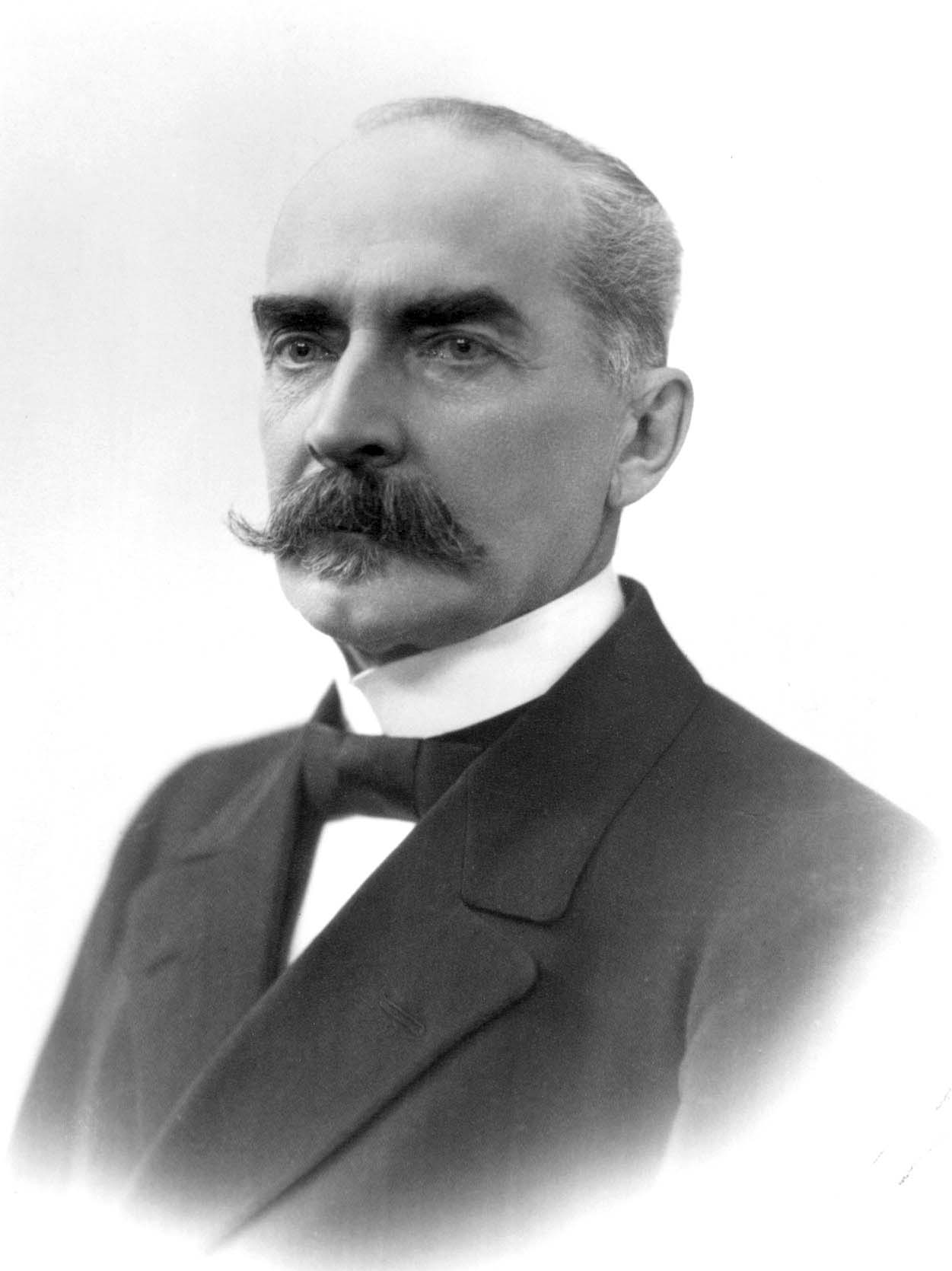
- Ståhlberg in 1919

1st President of Finland
- In office 26 July 1919 – 2 March 1925
- Prime Minister: Kaarlo Castrén; Juho Vennola; Rafael Erich; Aimo Kaarlo Cajander; Kyösti Kallio; Lauri Ingman
- Preceded by: Gustaf Mannerheim (as Regent)
- Succeeded by: Lauri Kristian Relander

Speaker of the Parliament of Finland
- In office 3 February 1914 – 3 April 1917
- Preceded by: Oskari Tokoi

Personal details
- Born: Carl Johan Ståhlberg; 28 January 1865 Suomussalmi, Finland
- Died: 22 September 1952 (aged 87) Helsinki, Finland
- Resting place: Hietaniemi Cemetery
- Party: National Progressive Party (ED)
- Spouse(s): Hedvig Irene Wåhlberg (desc.); Ester Hällström
- Profession: Lawyer; Civil servant; Professor; Judge
- K. J. Ståhlberg's voice Recorded July 26, 1919

Kaarlo Juho Ståhlberg (forenames Finnish: [ˈkɑːrlo ˈjuho], surname Finland Swedish: [ˈstoːlbærj]; 28 January 1865 – 22 September 1952) was a Finnish jurist and academic who was one of the most important pioneers of republicanism in the country. He was the first president of Finland (1919–1925) and a liberal nationalist.

Ståhlberg was an important figure in the drafting of Finland's republican constitution. As a jurist, he anchored the state in liberal democracy, guarded the fragile germ of the rule of law, and embarked on internal reforms. In implementing the form of government of 1919, Ståhlberg piloted an independent Finland towards acting in world politics; in presidential-led foreign and security policy, he relied on international law and diplomacy.

It was only after the opening of private archives of President J. K. Paasikivi that it was realized that Ståhlberg had a very significant political role as an “éminence grise” until his death. He was asked for advice and opinions, which were also followed. Paasikivi highly valued Ståhlberg, and even described his predecessor in exaggerated words: “Ståhlberg was a man who never made mistakes”.

== Biography ==
=== Early life ===
Johan Gabriel Ståhlberg (1832–1873); Kaarlo's father	Amanda Gustafva Castrén (1841–1907); Kaarlo's mother

Ståhlberg was born in Suomussalmi, in the Kainuu region of the Grand Duchy of Finland, back when Finland was an autonomous principality under the rule of the Russian Empire. He was the second child of Johan (Janne) Gabriel Ståhlberg, an assistant pastor, and Amanda Gustafa Castrén. On both sides of his family, Ståhlberg's male forebears had been Lutheran clergymen. He was christened Carl Johan (Finland Swedish: [ˈkɑːrl ˈjuːhɑn]), but later Finnicized his forenames to Kaarlo Juho, as did most Fennomans (i.e. the supporters of Finnish language and culture instead of Swedish).

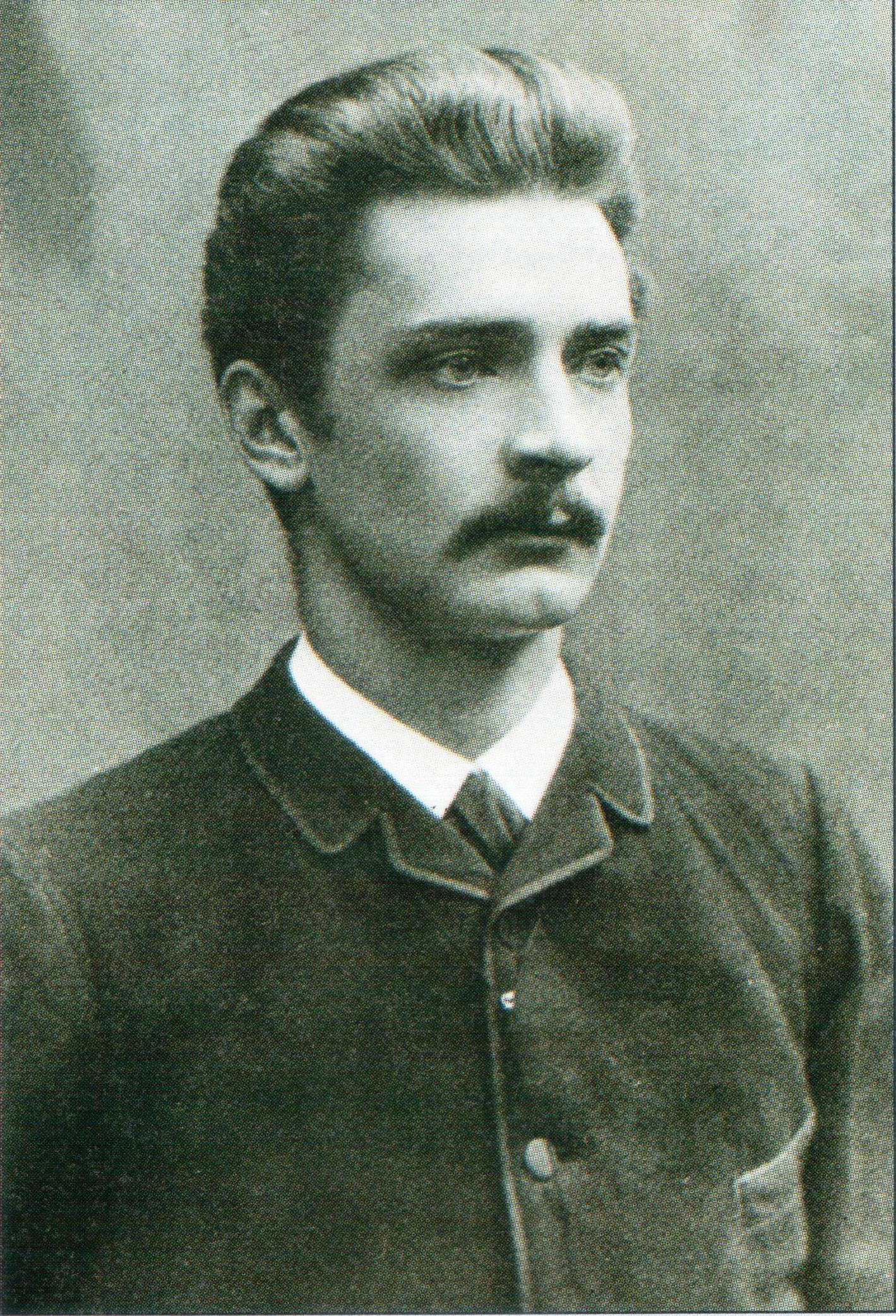
Young Kaarlo in the 1880s

Ståhlberg and his family lived in Lahti, where he also went for grammar school. Ståhlberg's father died when he was a boy, leaving his family in a difficult financial position. The family moved to Oulu, where the children entered school. Kaarlo's mother Amanda worked to support the family until her death in 1879. Ståhlberg's family had always spoken and supported the Finnish language, and the young Ståhlberg was enrolled in Oulu's private Finnish lycee, where he would excel, and was the primus of his class. In 1889 he graduated as a Bachelor of Arts in Law from the University of Helsinki. He gained his Doctorate in Law in 1893.

During his student years, Ståhlberg was active in student politics and moved in the circle around the cultural journal Valvoja, a grouping of liberal Young Finns of which his history professor E. G. Palmén was also a member. During this period he also worked as editor-in-chief of the journal Finland and as a teacher of Swedish at Tavastehus gymnasium.

=== Career as academic and civil servant ===
Ståhlberg soon began a very long career as the presenter and planner of the Senate's legislation, during the period when Finland was a Grand Duchy under Czarist rule. He was a "constitutionalist" – supporting the already existing Finnish constitutional framework and constitutional legislative policies, including legislative resistance, against the attempted Russification of Finland. He also came to support the call for women's suffrage, and had a moderate line on Prohibition.

Ståhlberg served as secretary of the Diet of Finland's finance committee in 1891 before being appointed as an assistant professor of Administrative Law and Economics at the University of Helsinki in 1894. It was at this time that he began his active involvement in politics, becoming a member of the Young Finnish Party.

In 1893, Ståhlberg married his first wife, Hedvig Irene Wåhlberg (1869–1917). They had six children together: Kaarlo (1894–1977), Aino (1895–1974), Elli (1899–1986), Aune (1901–1967), Juho (1907–1973), and Kyllikki (1908–1994).

In 1898, Ståhlberg was appointed as Protocol Secretary for the Senate's civil affairs subdepartment. This was the second-highest Rapporteur position in the Finnish government. This appointment to a senior position in the Finnish administration was approved by the new Governor General of Finland, Nikolai Bobrikov, whose term in office saw the beginning of the period of Russification, and whose policies represented all that the constitutionalist Ståhlberg was opposed to. Ståhlberg was elected in 1901 as a member of Helsinki City Council, serving until 1903. In 1902, he was dismissed as Protocol Secretary, due to his strict legalist views, and his opposition to legislation on compulsory military service.

Following his dismissal, Ståhlberg worked as chairman of the board of the life insurance company Suomi and as a clerical assistant at the Helsinki city treasury office (Finnish: rahatoimikamari).

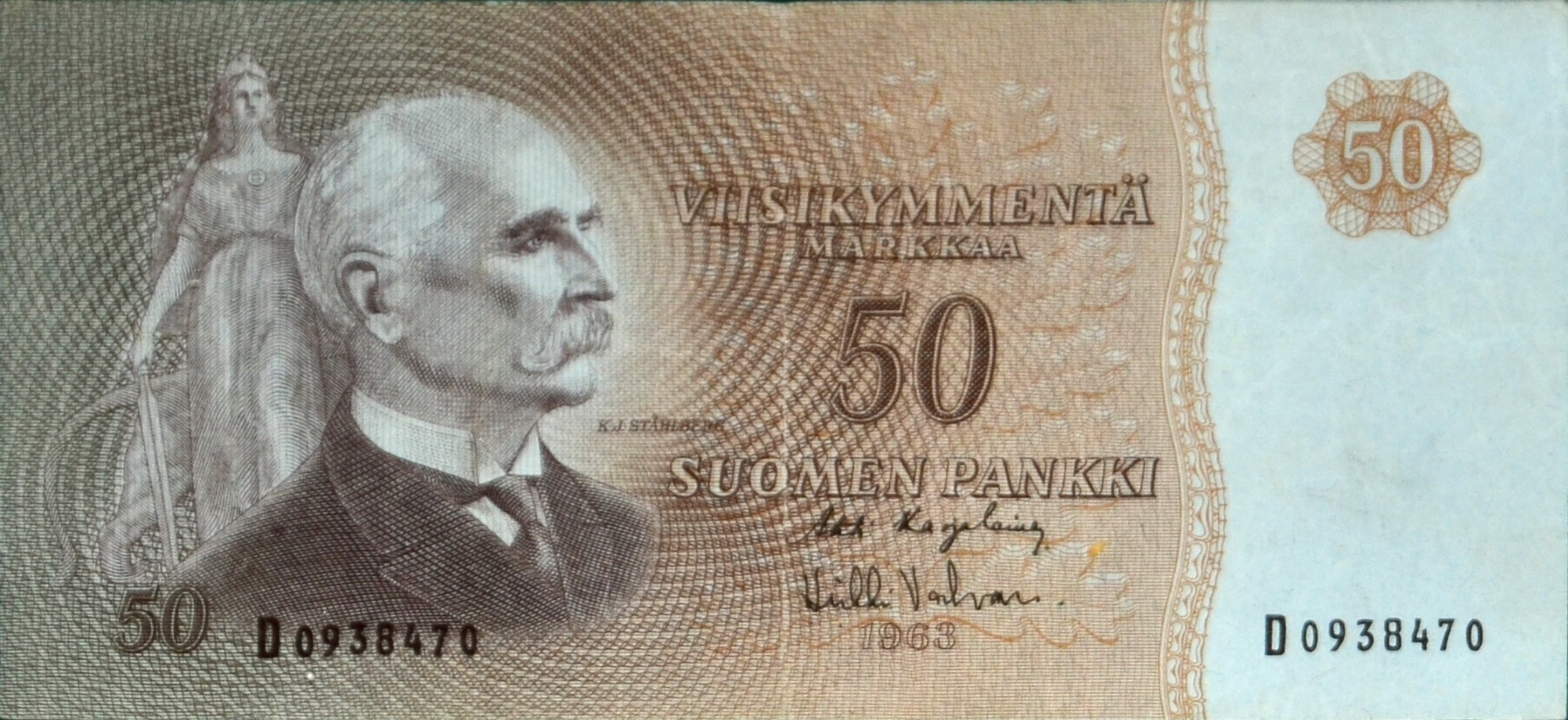
K. J. Ståhlberg on a 50 mark note from 1963.

=== Career as politician ===
Ståhlberg participated in the Diet of Finland (1904–1905) as a member of the Estate of Burgesses. In 1905, he was appointed as a Senator in the newly formed Senate of Leo Mechelin, with responsibility for trade and industry. One of the most important tasks facing the new constitutionalist Senate was to consider proposals for the reform of the Diet of Finland and, although initially sceptical about some of the proposal, Ståhlberg played a role in the drafting of the legislation which created the Parliament of Finland. Ståhlberg resigned from the Senate in 1907, due to Parliament's rejection of a Senate bill on the prohibition of alcohol.

The following year he resumed his academic career and was appointed as Professor of Administrative Law at the University of Helsinki, a position he retained until 1918. During his time in that post he wrote his most influential piece of work, "Finnish administrative law, volumes I & II." He also remained active in politics, being elected to the central committee of the Young Finnish Party. In 1908, Ståhlberg was elected as a member of Parliament for the Southern Häme constituency, which he represented until 1910. He also served as a member for the Southern Oulu constituency from 1913 until his appointment as President of the Supreme Administrative Court in 1918. Ståhlberg also served as Speaker of the Parliament in 1914.

After the February Revolution in 1917, Ståhlberg was backed by the majority of the non-socialists members of Parliament as a candidate to become Vice-Chairman of the Economic Department of the Senate. However, he did not receive the support of the Social Democrats, which he had made a precondition of his being elected. Instead, the Social Democrat Oskari Tokoi was elected, with Ståhlberg being appointed as chairman of the Constitutional Council. This body had been set up earlier to draw up plans for a new form of government for Finland, in light of the events surrounding the February Revolution and the abdication of Nicholas II as Emperor of Russia and Grand Duke of Finland.

The new form of government approved by the council was largely based on the 1772 Instrument of Government, dating from the period of Swedish rule. The proposed form of government was rejected by the Russian Provisional Government, and was then left largely forgotten for a time due to the confusion and urgency of the situation surrounding the October Revolution and the declaration of Finland's independence.

=== Architect of the Finnish constitution ===
After Finland gained its independence in December 1917, the Constitutional Committee drafted new proposals for a form of government of an independent Republic of Finland. As chairman of the council, Ståhlberg was involved in the drafting and re-drafting of constitutional proposals during 1918, when the impact of the Finnish Civil War, and debates between republicans and monarchists on the future constitution, all led to various proposals. His proposals would eventually be enacted as the Constitution of Finland in 1919. In 1918, Ståhlberg supported the idea of republic instead of a constitutional monarchy which was supported by more conservative victors of the civil war. Ståhlberg's appointment as the first President of the Supreme Administrative Court in 1918 meant that he relinquished his role as a member of Parliament, and was therefore not involved in the election by the Parliament of Prince Frederick Charles of Hesse as King of Finland in October of that year. As it became clear that Finland would be a republic, Stålberg also championed direct election of the President of Finland, but the Council of State chose the electoral college system, although the first President would be elected by Parliament.

=== First President of Finland ===
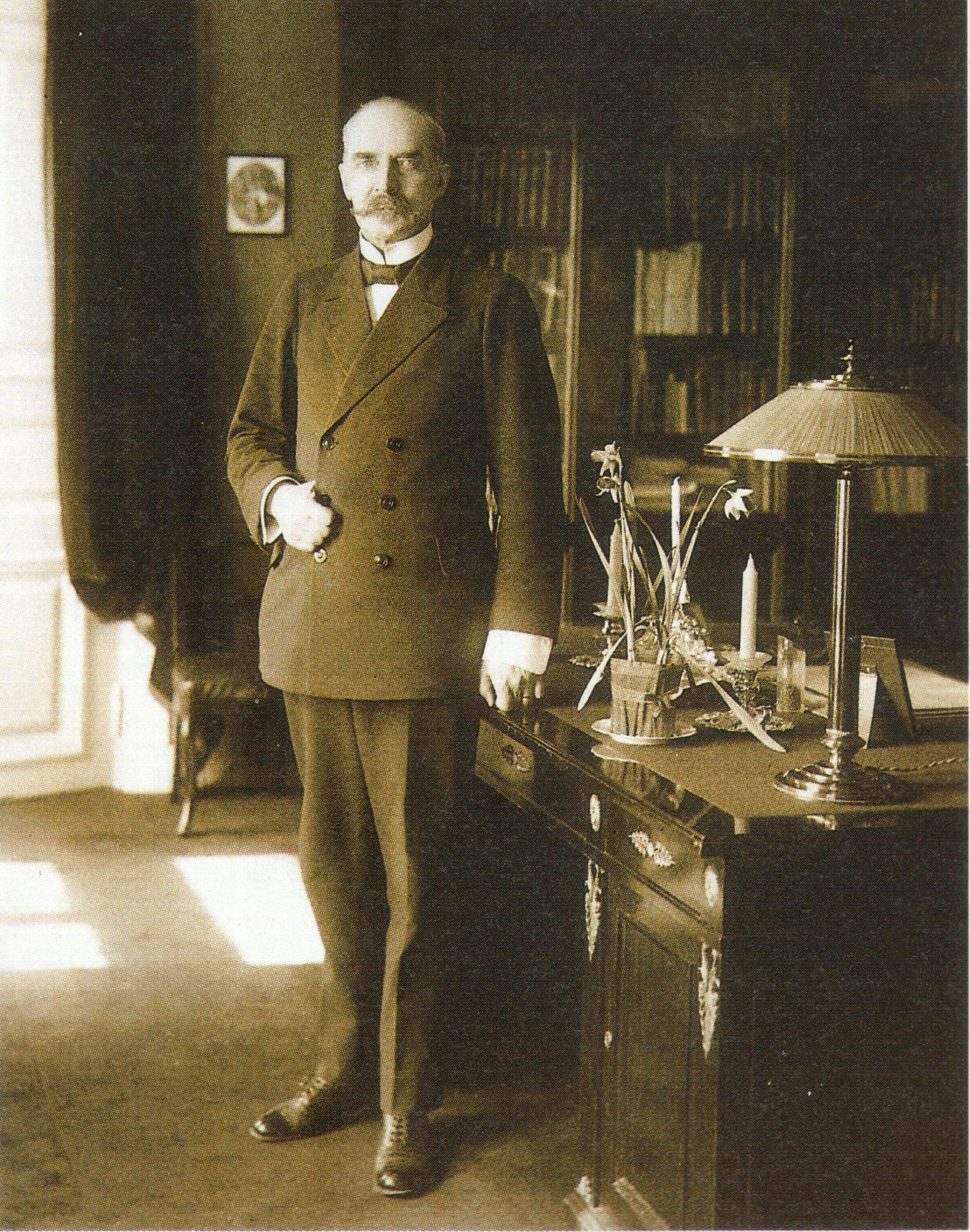
President Ståhlberg in his office in 1919.

Ståhlberg emerged as a candidate for president, with the support of the newly formed National Progressive Party, of which he was a member, and the Agrarian League. In the 1919 Finnish presidential election, he was elected by Parliament as President of the Republic on 25 July 1919, defeating Carl Gustaf Mannerheim (the candidate supported by the National Coalition and Swedish People's parties) by 143 votes to 50.

Ståhlberg was inaugurated as the first President of the Republic on the following day, and reluctantly moved out of his home in Helsinki to take up residence in the Presidential Palace.

Ståhlberg had been a widower since 1917, but in 1920, as president, he married his second wife, Ester Hällström (1870–1950). He was also very formal and, due to his shyness, wrote everything he had to say in public beforehand.

My grandfather was shy, just like me. He didn’t talk much; he kept his distance. When I visited him as a teenager, we would sit there together. Neither of us said a word. Grandfather didn’t know what to say, and I didn’t dare say anything. But it was incredibly nice just sitting there together. I liked my grandfather because he was always old, always calm, and always looked the same. Always the same dark blue suit. He was always the same, unchanging. That was something a child appreciated.

— Anneli Ståhlberg, his granddaughter,

Ståhlberg also had a distaste for official occasions, and he did not like travel or state visits, which is why, despite invitations and exhortations, he made no visits abroad during his presidency and received only one guest, Estonian President Konstantin Päts in May 1922. The Estonian head of state's visit was the first official visit to independent Finland. Finland's Ambassador to Stockholm, Werner Söderhjelm, repeatedly offered Ståhlberg a visit to its western neighbor Sweden, but Ståhlberg maintained his position:

"Let my followers then travel as much as they want."

The first official visit of the President of Finland abroad was made only by his successor, President L. K. Relander.

As the first President of the Republic, Ståhlberg had to form various presidential precedents and interpretations of how the office of President should be conducted. His term in office was also marked by a succession of short-lived governments. During his time as president, Ståhlberg nominated and appointed eight governments. These were mostly coalitions of the Agrarians and the National Progressive, National Coalition and Swedish People's parties, although Ståhlberg also appointed two caretaker governments. Importantly, Ståhlberg generally supported all the governments that he nominated, although he also sometimes disagreed with them. He forced Kyösti Kallio's first government to resign in January 1924, when he demanded early elections to restore the full membership of Parliament – 200 deputies – and Kallio disagreed. The Parliament had lacked 27 deputies since August 1923, when the Communist deputies had been arrested on suspicions of treason.

Ståhlberg supported moderate social and economic reforms to make even the former Reds accept the democratic republic. He pardoned most of the Red prisoners, despite the strong criticism that this aroused from many right-wing Finns, especially the White veterans of the Civil War and several senior army officers. He signed into law bills that gave the trade unions an equal power with the employers' organizations to negotiate labour contracts, a bill to improve the public care for the poor, and the Lex Kallio law which distributed land from the wealthy landowners to the former tenant farmers and other landless rural people.

In foreign policy Ståhlberg was markedly reserved towards Sweden, largely as a consequence of the Åland crisis, which marked the early years of his presidency. He was also cautious towards Germany, and generally unsuccessful in his attempts to establish closer contacts with Poland, the United Kingdom and France.

=== Post-presidential life ===
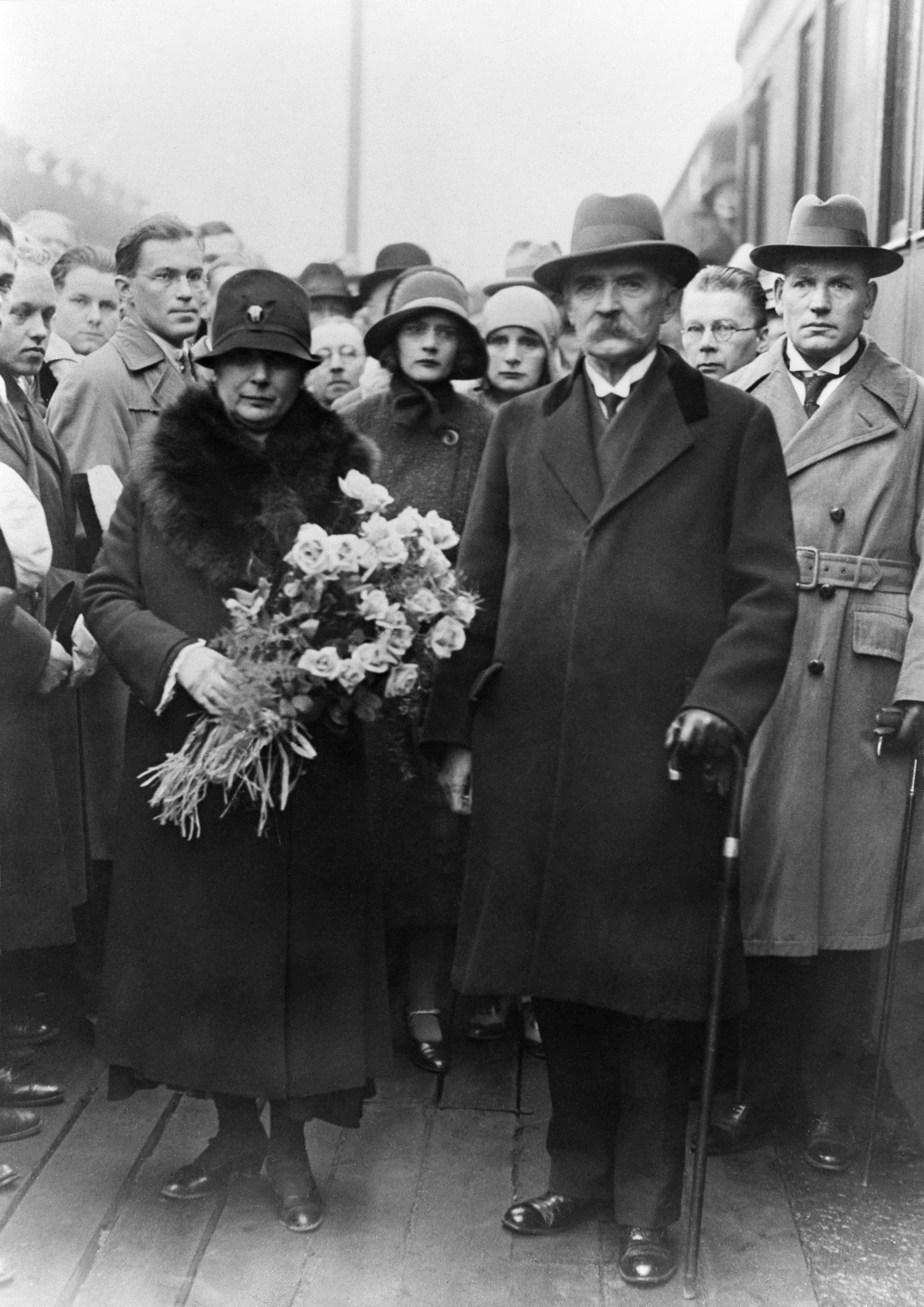
President Ståhlberg and his wife at the Helsinki Central Station after kidnapping. In the middle of picture his daughter Elli Ståhlberg stands behind them.

Ståhlberg did not seek re-election in 1925, finding his difficult term of office a great strain. He also believed that the right-wing and the monarchists would become more reconciled to the republic if he stepped down. According to the longtime late Agrarian and Centrist politician Johannes Virolainen, he believed that the incumbent president was too much favoured over the other candidates while standing for re-election.

Ståhlberg did not appreciate his presidential successor, Lauri Kristian Relander, at all, because Relander was the almost complete opposite of Ståhlberg. He would have preferred to have seen Risto Ryti as his successor; but when Relander was elected, he muttered:

May those take care of him who have hired him for it.

He was offered the post of Chancellor of the University of Helsinki, but declined it, instead becoming a member of the government's Law Drafting Committee. He also served as a National Progressive member of Parliament again, as a member for the Uusimaa constituency from 1930 to 1933.

In 1930, activists from the right-wing Lapua Movement kidnapped him and his wife, attempting to send them to the Soviet Union, but the incident merely hastened the Lapua Movement's demise.

Ståhlberg was a National Progressive Party candidate in the 1931 Presidential election, eventually losing to Pehr Evind Svinhufvud by only two votes in the third ballot. He was also a candidate in the 1937 election, eventually finishing third.

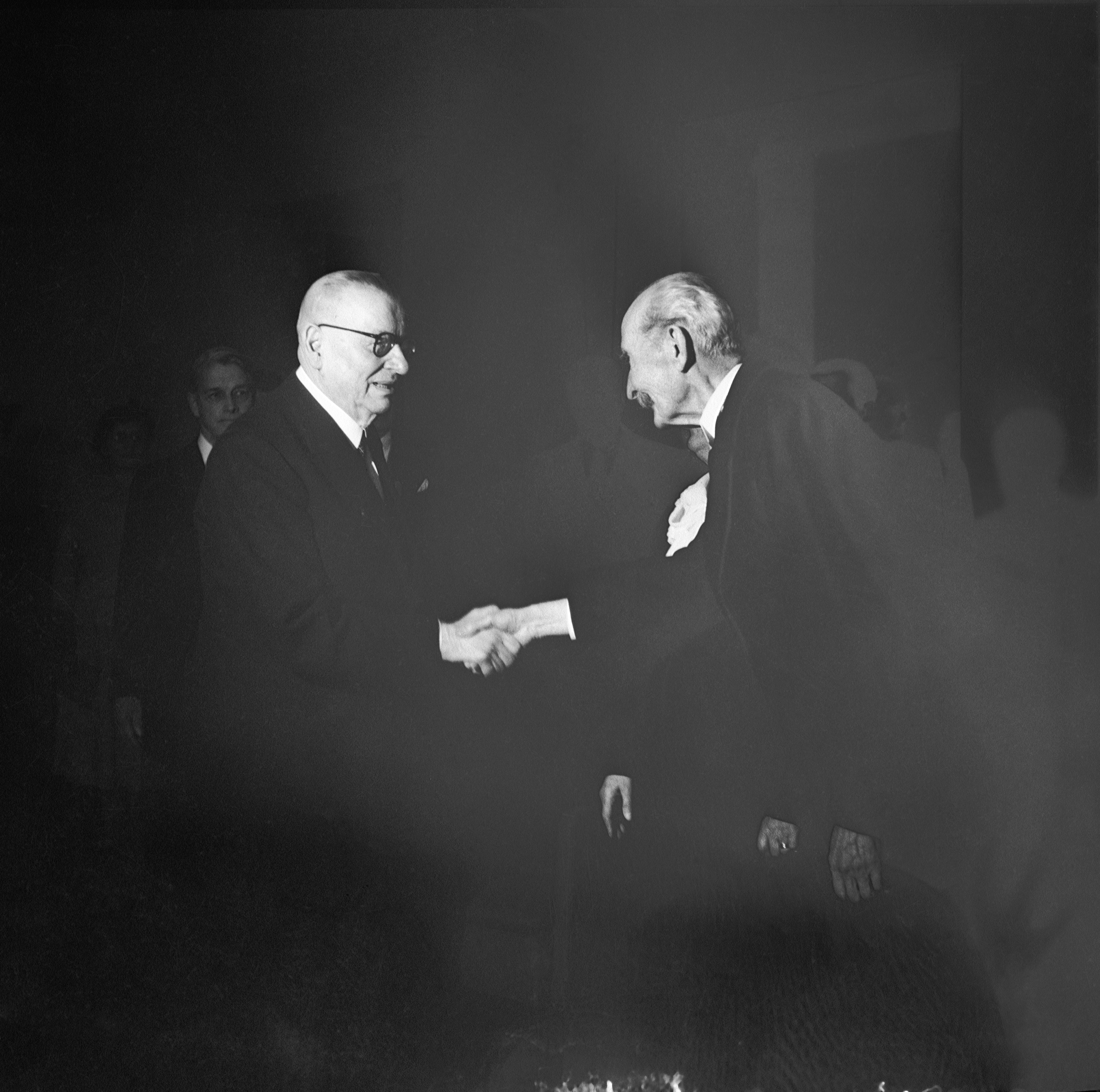
Finnish ex-president Kaarlo Juho Ståhlberg's birthday reception in 1950. The President-in-office J.K. Paasikivi congratulates him.

In 1946, Ståhlberg retired and became the legal adviser of President J. K. Paasikivi. Paasikivi often consulted Ståhlberg; for example, under the 1950 presidential election an emergency plan was planned to extend Paasikivi's term in parliament as president, which Ståhlberg condemned angrily in his letter to Paasikivi:

"If the Finnish people cannot and do not bother to elect a head of state once every six years, it will not really deserve an independent democratic state."

Their last discussion occurred less than two weeks before Ståhlberg died. He died on 22 September 1952, and was buried in Helsinki's Hietaniemi cemetery with full honours.

Among Finnish Presidents, Ståhlberg is generally regarded as a moral and principled defender of democracy and of the rule of law, and as the father of the Finnish Constitution. His decision to voluntarily give up the presidency is also seen as a sign that he was not a power-hungry career politician.

In September 1959, a statue in honour of Ståhlberg was unveiled outside the Parliament House in Helsinki. The statue was created by the sculptor Wäinö Aaltonen.

== In popular culture ==
An upcoming comedy film about Ståhlberg kidnapping called The Kidnapping of a President is in the development, and in the film, President Ståhlberg will be played by Pertti Sveholm.

== Honours ==
=== Awards and decorations ===
- Finland : Grand Cross, with Collar, of the Order of the White Rose of Finland (25 July 1919)
- Finland : Grand Cross of the Order of the White Rose of Finland (16 May 1919)
- Latvia : Order of the Three Stars, 1st Class (15 May 1926)
- Poland Grand Cross of the Order of Polonia Restituta
- Estonia : Cross of Liberty III/1 (14 December 1920)

== See also ==
- List of presidents of Finland

Political offices
Preceded by Oskari Tokoi	Speaker of the Parliament of Finland; 1914	Succeeded by Kullervo Manner
Preceded by Carl Gustaf Emil Mannerheim as Regent of Finland	President of Finland; 26 July 1919 – 2 March 1925	Succeeded by Lauri Kristian Relander
