= Pohjala =

Pohjala is a Finnish surname. Notable people with the surname include:

- Kyllikki Pohjala (1894–1979), Finnish politician and nurse
- Toivo Pohjala (1888–1969), Finnish wrestler and harness racing driver
- Toivo Topias Pohjala (1931–2018), Finnish agronomist and politician

== See also ==
- Aavo Põhjala, president of Estonian Judo Federation
- Põhjala Brewery, Estonian craft brewery
