= Ryti–Ribbentrop Agreement =

1944 letter from Finland to Nazi Germany

Ryti–Ribbentrop agreement
Ryti–Ribbentrop letter of agreement
- Type: Letter from Risto Ryti, President of Finland, to Adolf Hitler
- Context: Continuation War
- Signed: 26 June 1944
- Location: Helsinki, Finland
- Expiration: 1 August 1944 with the resignation of Ryti
- Negotiators: (Finland) Risto Ryti; (Finland) C. G. E. Mannerheim; (Finland) Henrik Ramsay; (Nazi Germany) Joachim von Ribbentrop; (Nazi Germany) Waldemar Erfurth
- Signatories: Risto Ryti, President of Finland
- Language: Finnish

The Ryti–Ribbentrop letter of agreement (Finnish: Ryti–Ribbentrop-sopimus) was a personal letter from President of Finland Risto Ryti to German Führer Adolf Hitler signed on 26 June 1944. It was sent during the Soviet Vyborg–Petrozavodsk Offensive, which had started on 9 June and threatened to knock Finland out of the Continuation War.

The letter was a product of a week of Finno-German negotiations, where the Germans sought a political commitment to the war, while the Finns sought increased military aid in the form of both troops and materiel. In the letter, Ryti agreed not to seek a separate peace in the war with the Soviet Union without approval from Nazi Germany. The letter was intentionally phrased by the Finns in a way where it would not bind Ryti's successors, as Finland had already contacted the Soviet Union in secret, seeking to exit the war.

During the negotiations, the Germans sent to Finland one infantry division, a brigade of assault guns, and a Luftwaffe detachment. The Finns also received significant amounts of anti-tank weaponry. Because most of the German aid either predated the agreement, or alternatively arrived too late to meaningfully contribute to the Finnish success in stabilizing the military situation, historians have questioned whether the agreement was a necessity for the Finns.

The agreement, which completely bypassed the Finnish Parliament, was criticized heavily both within Finland and internationally. In July, Germany pulled all forces out of southern Finland, and Ryti resigned on 1 August, resulting in a Finno-Soviet armistice on 2 September. As a condition for peace, Finland had to remove any remaining German forces from Lapland, resulting in the Lapland War.

== Historical background ==
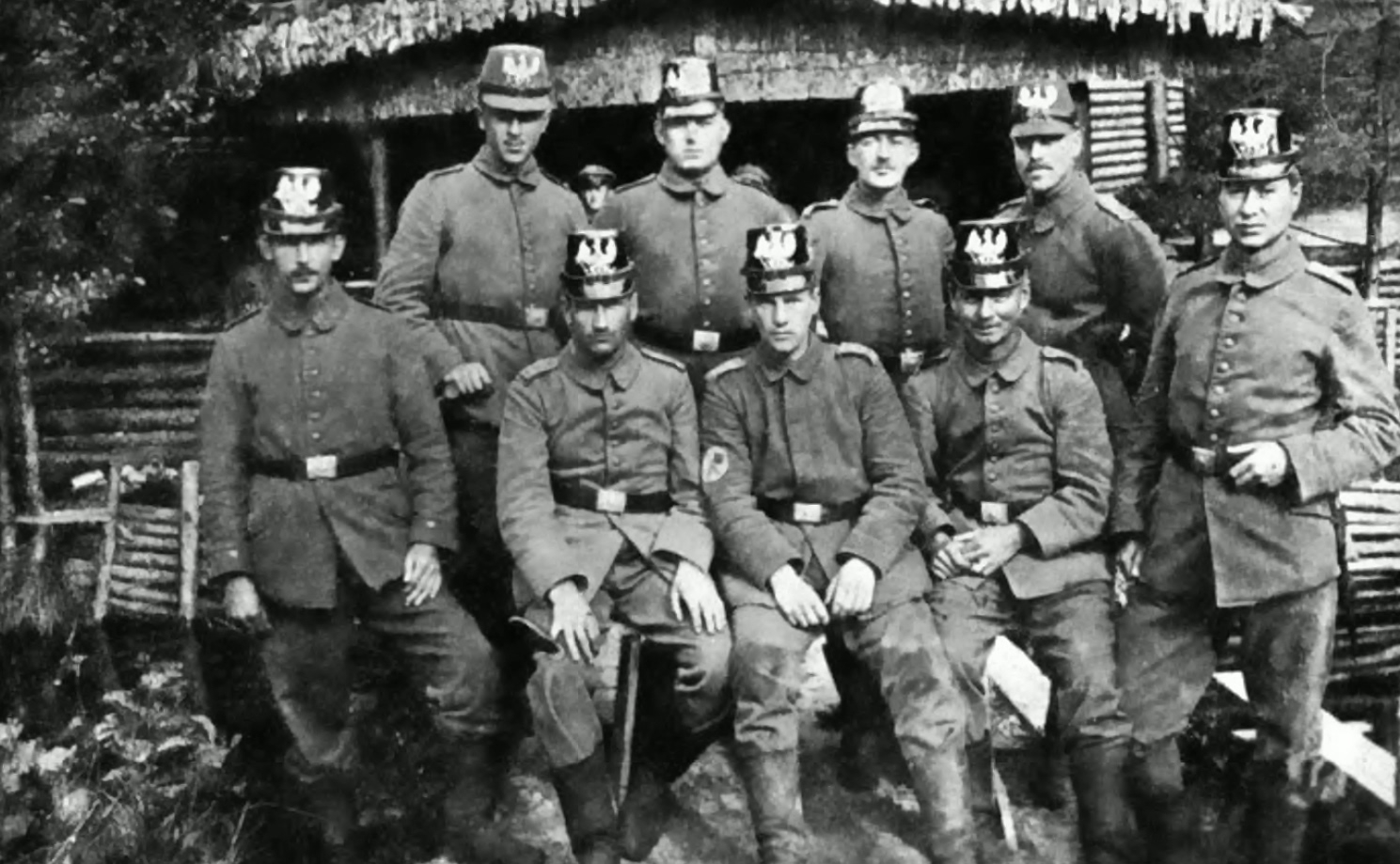
Members of the 27th Royal Prussian Jäger Battalion on the Eastern Front of World War I.

The Finnish military ties to Germany date back to World War I and the Finnish Civil War. During World War I, some 1,900 Finnish volunteers of the Jäger Movement traveled in secret to Germany where they received military training and formed the 27th Royal Prussian Jäger Battalion. The Battalion fought as part of the Imperial German Army on the Eastern Front of World War I. Following the start of the Finnish Civil War on 27 January 1918, the volunteers returned to Finland to fight on the side of the Whites. They took various roles in the White army, with some 400 jägers being promoted to officers and approximately 660 becoming non-commissioned officers. The jägers were soon joined by Imperial German forces who also took part on the side of the Whites and captured the capital Helsinki by mid-April. After the civil war, the jäger volunteers would go on to take leading roles in the post-civil war Finnish Army, which was consequently heavily influenced by a German military tradition.

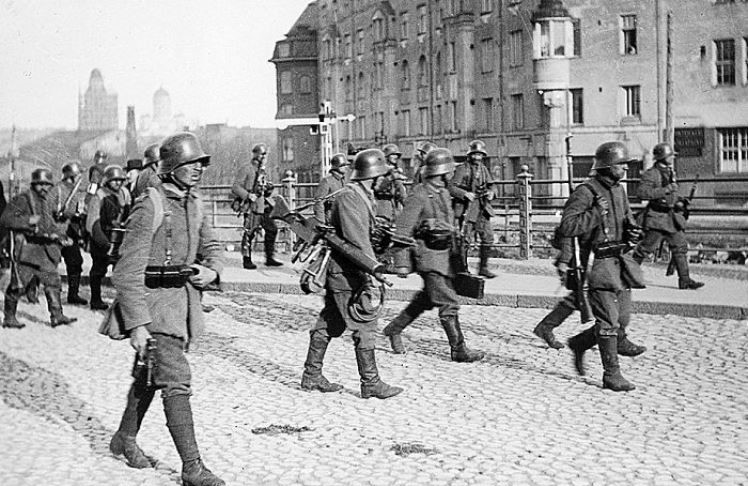
Troops of the German Baltic Sea Division in Helsinki during the Finnish Civil War.

Following the civil war, Germanophilic, Russophobic and anti-communist stances were prevalent especially among the ruling elites and the military leadership. These anti-communist sentiments were common even among those Finnish officers whose background was in the Russian Army. At the same time, this Germanophilia was not accompanied by keen Nazi sympathy. For example, Marshal Carl Gustaf Emil Mannerheim, who commanded the White forces during the Finnish Civil War and would go on to command the Finnish military during World War II, "preferred alliances with the Western Powers and the Scandinavian countries rather than with Germany."

The Finno-Soviet Winter War began on 26 November 1939, when the Soviet Union attacked Finland. The attack followed the signing of the Soviet–German Molotov–Ribbentrop Pact which in a secret appendix assigned Finland into the Soviet sphere of influence. While the international reactions to the war were strongly against the Soviet Union, the international outrage materialized in only limited support, focused on materiel rather than troops. The British and French planned for an expeditionary force in December 1939, but the plans remained "diffused" and vague to the end of the war. Similarly, the lack of German support came as a shock to many in Finland.

After the end of the Winter War in early 1940, Finnish officers began discussions with Germans about a possible future war with the Soviet Union. While historians have been unable to establish exactly what was discussed when and by whom, it is known that Hermann Göring messaged the Finnish leadership already during the Winter War, urging them to seek peace as the losses would be returned later. Later in the fall of 1940, the Finnish government allowed German troop movements to northern Norway.

Concrete negotiations for the future war between military officials began in 1941, potentially as early as January, but at the latest on 25 May 1941 in Salzburg. The Finns and the Germans agreed that Germany would take responsibility for operations in northern Finland, while the Finnish army was in charge of operations in the southeast of Finland and east of Lake Ladoga. The Finns would advance into Soviet Eastern Karelia where they would link up with German forces on the Svir. Forward elements of the German troops began arriving in Finland on 1 June, while follow-on talks continued in Helsinki to 6 June, with the Finnish army mobilizing on 10 June 1941.

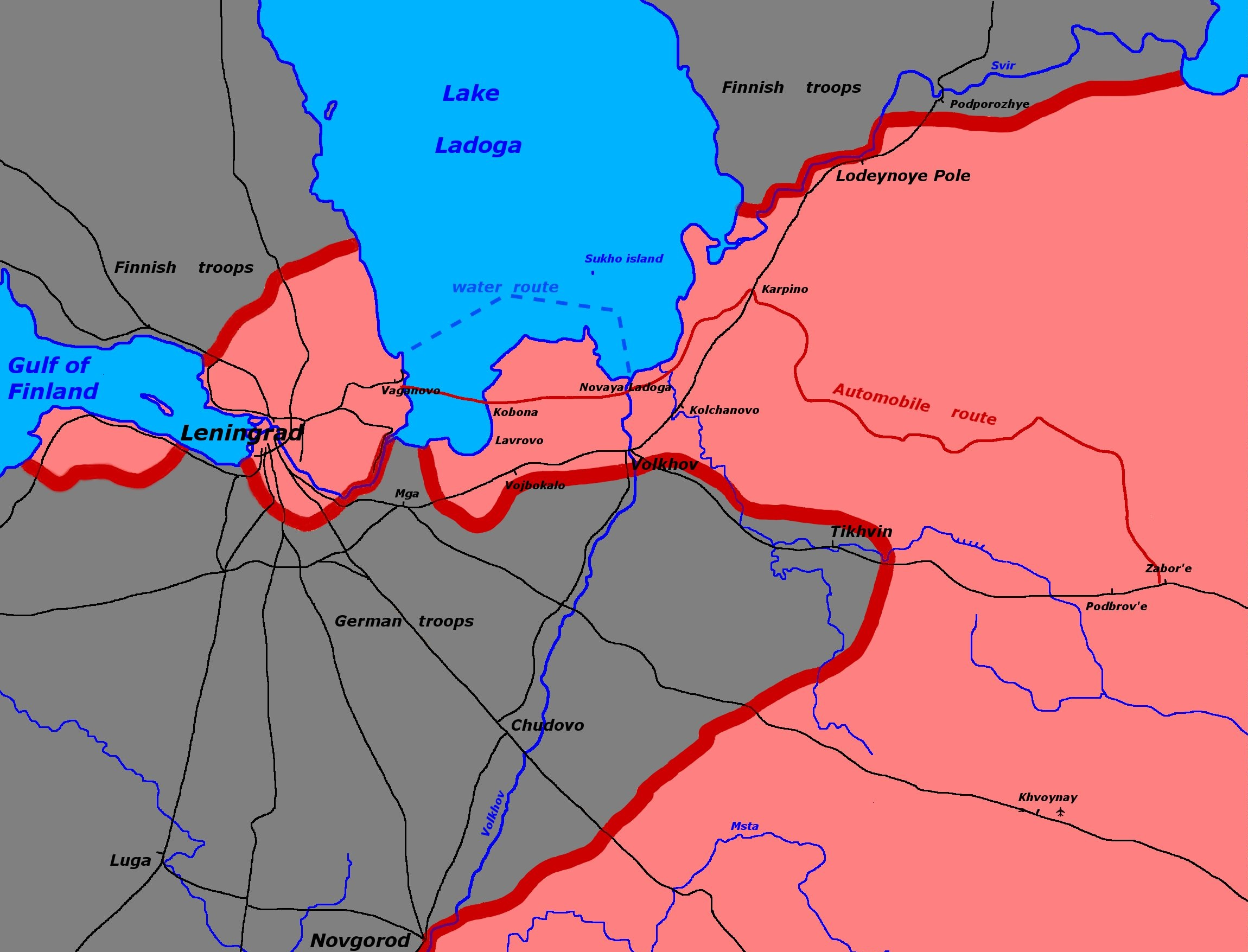
Finnish and German front lines in the area of Leningrad in December 1941.

Following the start of Operation Barbarossa on 22 June, the Soviet Air Force struck various targets in Finland. These included both military targets, such as airfields used by the Germans, as well as civilian targets in Helsinki and other major Finnish cities. Following the bombings, the Finnish parliament announced on 25 June that war had broken out between Finland and the Soviet Union. The Finnish Army of Karelia began offensive operations in south-eastern Finland on the night of 9–10 July 1941, with Finnish troops crossing the border soon after midnight. The Finnish forces reached Svir by 8 September, with forces of the Finnish VI corps arriving at Kuuttilahti, Lodeynoye Pole and the Svir railway station. The Finns crossed the river on 12 September, establishing a bridgehead that would eventually reach a width of 100 kilometres (62 mi) and a depth of 20 kilometres (12 mi). It soon became clear, however, that the German forces would not be able to reach the Svir from the south. The Finns were hesitant to advance southwards, themselves, and the front stabilized into stationary or trench warfare.

Despite the extremely close Finno-German collaboration, Finland consistently rejected a political alliance with Germany, instead framing its actions to the Western powers as a separate, defensive war. Over the winter of 1941–42, the Finnish leadership became increasingly worried about the direction of the war. Finland, however, remained dependent on Germany for both food and military supply. Only after the collapse of the siege of Leningrad in January 1944 and the bombing of several Finnish cities did the Finns prepare for peace talks. The Germans answered these peace feelers by a weapons and grain embargo, which further increased the Finnish dependence on German aid. The situation deteriorated further when the Soviet Union launched the Vyborg–Petrozavodsk Offensive on 9 June 1944.

== Negotiations ==
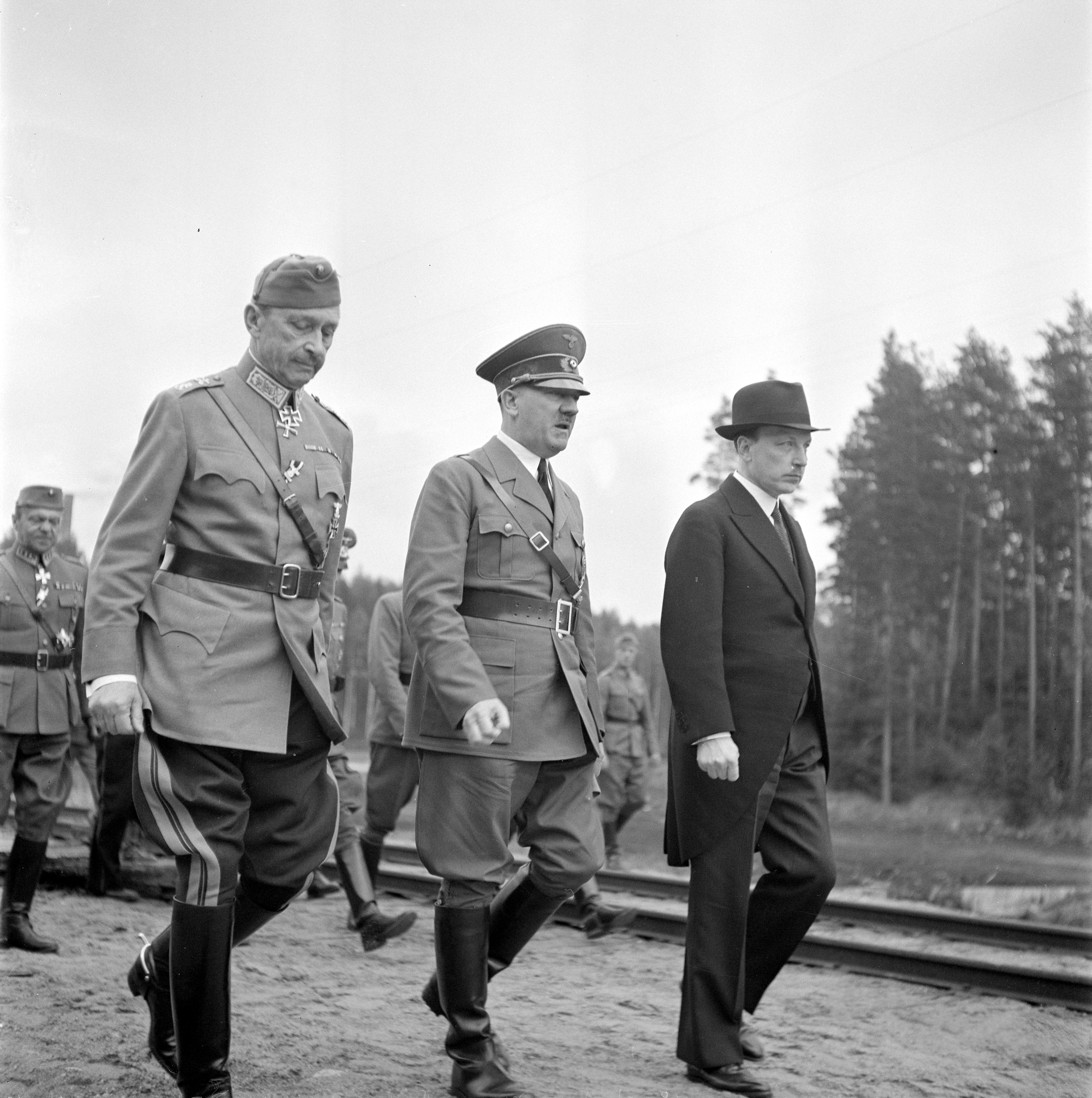
Mannerheim, Hitler and Ryti, photographed during Hitler's visit to Finland on 4 June 1942.

The situation had not stabilized by 17 June, and the Finns were being pushed back, especially on the Karelian Isthmus, causing increasing concern among both the Finns and the Germans. It appeared to the Germans that Finnish forces would not be able to halt the offensive on their own, and preparations were made to evacuate all German citizens from Finland. The Finnish General Headquarters, meanwhile, estimated that six to eight German divisions would be needed to defeat the Soviet offensive in addition to material aid.

This request for troops was then conveyed to German officials in Finland on 20 June. According to historian Markku Jokisipilä, the Finns would have known that such a request was unrealistic given the larger German strategic situation, and that the request was likely also intended to test whether the Germans had sufficient forces to retaliate against Finland in case it decided to seek an exit from the war. The German representative in Finland, Waldemar Erfurth, reported this request to the German High Command, who understood that the Finns also wanted closer political ties.

Hitler reacted to the Finnish request for aid by first ordering that the troops assigned to operations Tanne Ost and Tanne West, contingency plans for the capture of Suursaari and Åland from the Finns, be put on high alert. Soon after, however, he decided to send one brigade of assault guns, a division of infantry, and a detachment of aircraft to Finland as aid. He also ordered shipments of military material to be expedited. Finally, several light ships of the Kriegsmarine, including 6 submarines and the cruisers Prinz Eugen and Niobe, were ordered to the area. This help was contingent on the Finns holding the VKT-line of defense. The requested six divisions would not be available at this time.

On 21 June, the German High Command officially replied to the Finns that it was prepared to send the Finns one assault gun brigade, one detachment of aircraft, 30 assault guns, 40 Pak 40 anti-tank guns, 10,000 shots for Panzershreck anti-tank weapons, and some 85,000 rounds of artillery shells in various calibers. In turn, the Germans expected the Finns to hold the VKT-line of defenses. The situation, however, remained confused. In a phone call later that day, Erfurth was informed that the decision for sending aid had not, in fact, yet been officially made. Concurrently with these discussions, the Finnish leadership was privately discussing a need to exit the war, and decided to send out further peace feelers in secret.

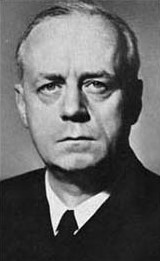
Ribbentrop, pictured during the Nuremberg trials.

Some disagreement remains over the discussions within the German leadership between 21 and 22 June. In any case, on 22 June 1944, Hitler sent his minister of foreign affairs Joachim von Ribbentrop to Helsinki. Ribbentrop was instructed to force the Finnish government to sign a political treaty with Germany in exchange for continued weapons shipments and other military aid. On the same day, the German cruisers Prinz Eugen and Admiral Hipper arrived in Helsinki, prompting Finnish concerns about the German intentions. The Finns were informed that a division from Heeresgruppe Nord had been ordered to reinforce the Finns, and that the first half of the promised assault gun brigade would arrive in Helsinki later that day. In all, the Germans could be expected to arrive at the front by 27 June.

In negotiations with the Finnish President Risto Ryti during the night of 22–23 June, Ribbentrop indicated the Germans would be able to send further help in the form of aircraft and two or three assault gun brigades, and that a further one or two divisions of infantry could be "considered." On 23 June, Ribbentrop informed Erfurth that all help, including that currently en route, was contingent on a clear, official, "confessions" to Germany and that the "theory" of a Finnish separate war was no longer acceptable to the Germans. The decision would have to be made by 25 June, when Ribbentrop was to travel to Bulgaria, and this information was conveyed to the Finnish representatives the following day.

While the Finnish political and military leadership continued discussions on how to reply to the German demands, a Soviet reply to the Finnish peace feelers arrived in Helsinki. In it, the Soviet Union demanded an official declaration, signed by both the president and the minister of foreign affairs, that the Finns truly were prepared to surrender. This caused further chaos in the Finnish leadership, who were divided about the correct steps to take.

In a meeting on 24 June, the Finnish leadership estimated that the situation on the Finnish fronts had stabilized, with Soviet forces suffering heavy casualties and transferring their focus further south. The Germans were presented with a draft of a Finnish declaration that promised the Finns would continued to fight the Soviets, albeit without reference to fighting "alongside" the Germans. This draft, however, was rejected by Ribbentrop as being too vague and non-binding. He replied with a draft letter, to be signed and sent by Ryti. A key point of the letter was a promise that the Finns would not "lay down their arms" unless in agreement with the Germans. Debate remains about whether the rest of the German military and political leadership was aware of Ribbentrop's hard line.

By 26 June, Mannerheim had been convinced that the Finns had to accept the German demands, but sought ways to make an agreement less binding. In the end, following Finno-German negotiations over some of the exact verbiage driven by the Finnish minister of foreign affairs Henrik Ramsay, it was decided that the Finnish government would completely bypass the parliament, and instead send a letter, signed personally by Ryti, which stated that no Finnish government or official authorized by Ryti would start peace negotiations without consulting with Germany. The letter had neither the official support of the Finnish government, nor was it passed through parliament. Ryti later stated that the agreement had been crafted specifically so as to not bind his successors.

== Final agreement ==
The final text of the letter, as sent by Ryti, is as follows (Finnish on the left, English translation on the right):

Suur-Saksan Valtakunnan Johtaja
Adolf Hitler

Korkeutenne!

Viitaten kanssanne käytyihin keskusteluihin haluan lausua tyydytykseni siitä, että Saksa tulee täyttämään Suomen hallituksen toivomuksen, joka koskee aseellista apua, ja että se, huomioon ottaen venäläisten hyökkäykset Karjalassa, viipymättä antaa apua Suomen sotavoimille lähettämällä saksalaisia joukkoja ja materiaalia. Lisäksi olen todennut Valtakunnanulkoministerin antaman lupauksen, jonka mukaan Saksan valtakunta tulevaisuudessakin tulee antamaan Suomelle kaikkea sen omiin mahdollisuuksiin kuuluvaa apua, lyödäkseen yhdessä Suomen sotavoimien kanssa venäläisten Suomea vastaan tekemän rynnistyksen takaisin.

Saan tässä yhteydessä vakuuttaa Teille, että Suomi on päättänyt käydä Saksan rinnalla sotaa Neuvostovenäjää vastaan siksi, kunnes se uhka, jolle Suomi on alttiina Neuvostoliiton taholta, on poistettu.

Huomioon ottaen sen aseveljen avun, jota Saksa antaa Suomelle nykyisessä vaikeassa asemassaan, selitän Suomen tasavallan presidenttinä, etten muuta kuin yhteisymmärryksessä Saksan valtakunnan hallituksen kanssa tee rauhaa Neuvostoliiton kanssa enkä salli, että nimittämäni Suomen hallitus tai kukaan muukaan henkilö ryhtyy aselepoa tai rauhaa koskeviin neuvotteluihin muuten kuin yhteisymmärryksessä Saksan valtakunnan hallituksen kanssa.

Führer of the Greater German Reich
Adolf Hitler

Your Highness!

In reference to discussions held with you, I wish to declare my satisfaction on the fact that Germany will fulfill the wish of the Finnish government regarding military aid and that, in the light of the Soviet attacks in Karelia, will without delay give aid to the Finnish Army by sending German troops and materiel. In addition, I have noticed the promise of the Reich's foreign minister, according to which the German Reich will continue to give Finland all the help it is able to so that it can, together with the Finnish Army, turn back the Soviet assault on Finland.

At this conjuncture, I can ensure You, that Finland has decided to wage war alongside Germany against the Soviet Union until the threat posed by the Soviet Union against Finland has been eliminated.

In light of the help of a comrade in arms, which Germany is giving Finland in its current difficult situation, I will note as the President of the Republic, that I will not, unless in agreement with the government of the German Reich, make peace with the Soviet Union, nor will I allow that a Government of Finland or any other person appointed by me to begin negotiations for an armistice or peace with the Soviet Union unless in agreement with the German government.

== Reactions and consequences ==
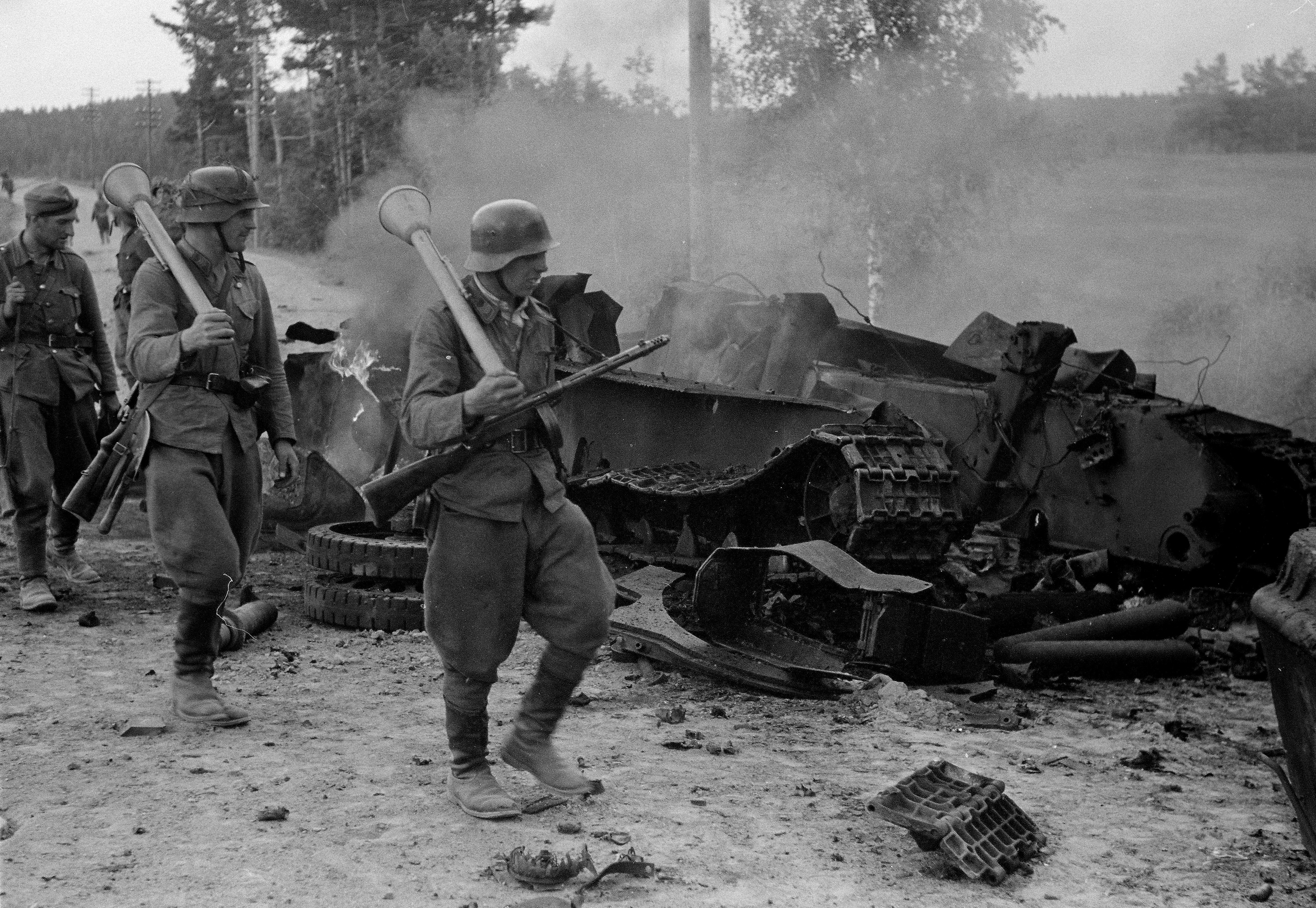
Finnish soldiers carrying German Panzerfausts inspect a destroyed Soviet T-34 tank destroyed by a German assault gun during the Battle of Tali-Ihantala on 30 June 1944.

The agreement was criticized heavily both in Finland and internationally, but resulted in the renewal of German weapons shipments. The Social Democratic Party threatened to leave the government. While it did not act on the threat following internal debate, it published a statement where it denounced the letter and the idea that Finland was not in a separate defensive war. Internationally, United States severed diplomatic ties with Finland on 30 June.

Historians disagree about the necessity of the agreement. There exists a general agreement that especially the Panzerfaust and Panzerschrek anti-tank weapons were the most important part of the German aid. The weapons used to halt the Soviet offensive, however, were already in Finland by the time the agreement was signed. Some historians, such as Vesa Nenye et al., state that the German military materiel, together with support from a German infantry division, an assault gun brigade and the Luftwaffe Detachment Kuhlmey, allowed the Finns to eventually stop the Soviet offensive. These formations, however, had also been sent to Finland in the days prior to the signing of the agreement. On the other hand, their continued stay in Finland could be attributed to the agreement. Similarly, Markku Jokisipilä estimates that Finnish stockpiles of artillery shells would have lasted to the end of the year. Jokisipilä cites historian Osmo Kolehmainen, who states that the German aid had an "almost inconsequential" effect on the stabilization of the front, with the exception of the Luftwaffe detachment.

Only a few weeks later, on 12 July, the Soviet offensive was officially halted, with troops transferred further south. Soon after, Hitler decided to pull back any German presence in southern Finland. Two assault gun brigades that had been ordered to Finland were instead redirected to other sectors of the front, and on 21 July, Detachment Kuhlmey was recalled from Finland.

== Finnish exit from the war ==
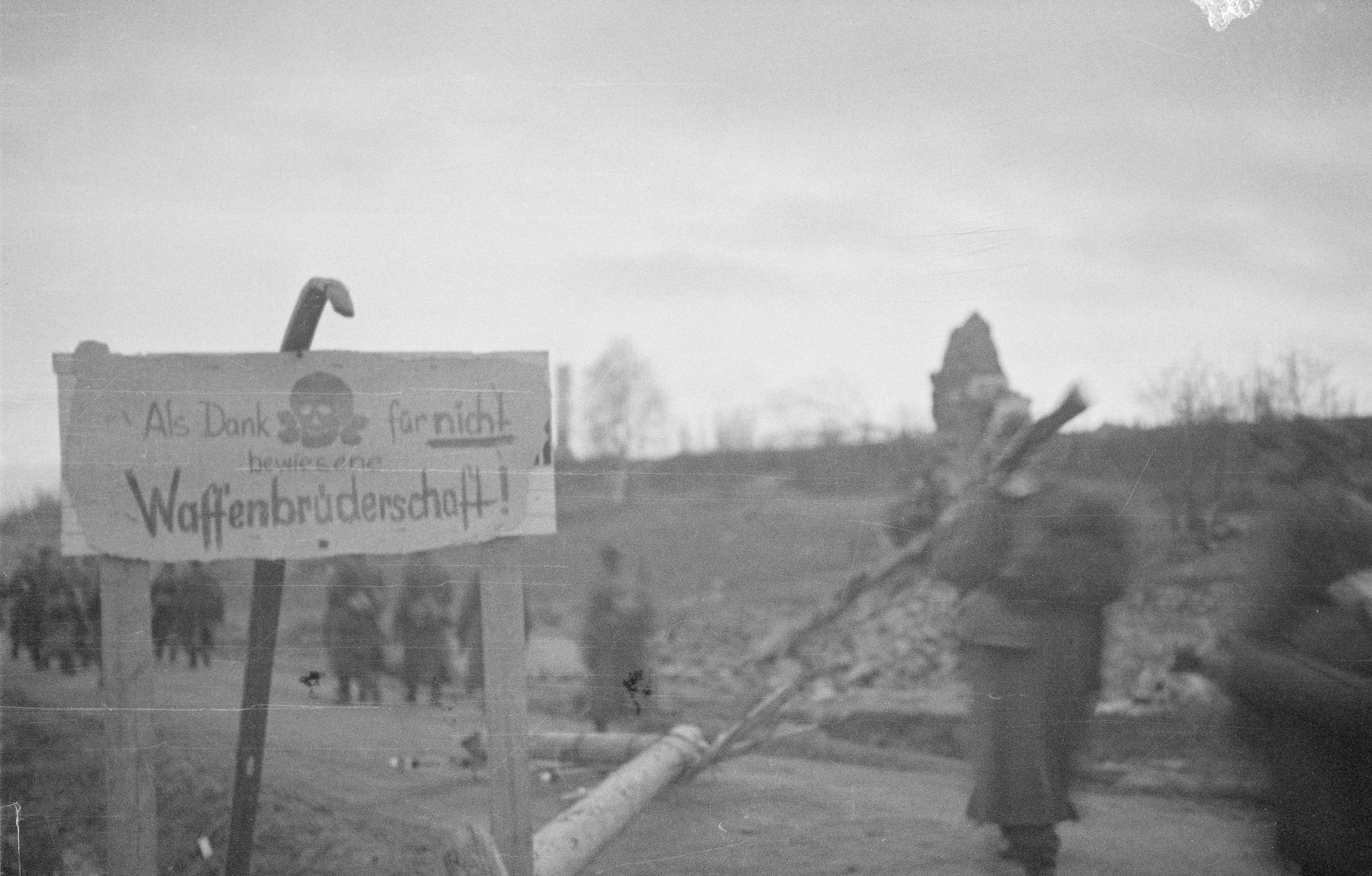
A sign the Germans left in Muonio during the Lapland War: "As a thanks for not demonstrating brotherhood in arms"

While the Soviet offensive had been halted, the Finns remained in a precarious strategic situation. They were still dependent on German food, and German forces remained in the country. At the same time, the Soviets would have no need for a negotiated peace if Finland waited until a German exit from the war. On 17 July 1944, the Soviets informed the Finns that they were prepared for peace negotiations, with the main demand being that Finland would need to change its government. As a result, on 1 August 1944, Ryti resigned the presidency and was replaced by Mannerheim on 4 August. The Germans attempted to keep the Finns involved in the war by sending Chief of the German High Command Wilhelm Keitel to Helsinki on 17 August, but Mannerheim informed Keitel he did not consider himself to be bound by Ryti's agreement.

Finno-Soviet negotiations continued until 2 September, when the Finnish parliament accepted the Soviet demands. A cease-fire was agreed to begin on 4 September, ending the war between the Finns and the Soviets. As part of the Soviet demands, the Finns were to evict any remaining German forces from Finland. Accordingly, on 2 September 1944, the Finns informed the Germans of severing all ties between the nations, and demanded that Germans leave Finland. Despite initial peaceful movements by the Germans, the situation soon deteriorated in the wake of an attempted German landing on the Finnish-held Suursaari, resulting in the Finno-German Lapland War, which ended on 27 April 1945 when the last German forces left Finnish territory.

== See also ==
- Finlandisation
