= Edwin Linkomies =

Prime minister of Finland from 1943 to 1944

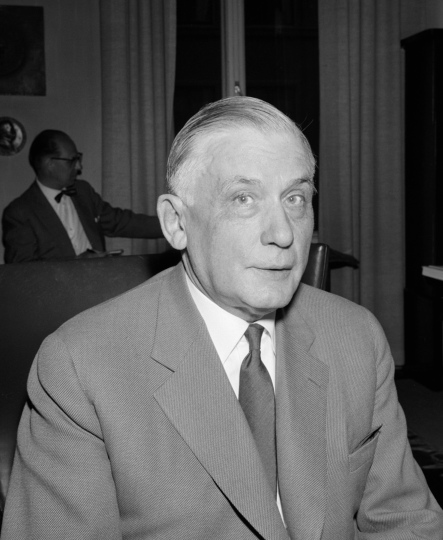

16th Prime Minister of Finland
- In office 5 March 1943 – 8 August 1944
- President: Risto Ryti; Carl Gustaf Emil Mannerheim
- Preceded by: Johan Wilhelm Rangell
- Succeeded by: Antti Hackzell

Personal details
- Born: Edwin Johannes Hildegard Flinck; 22 December 1894 Vyborg, Grand Duchy of Finland, Russian Empire
- Died: 9 September 1963 (aged 68) Helsinki, Finland
- Party: National Coalition Party
- Relatives: Sinikka Linkomies-Pohjala (daughter)
- Education: University of Helsinki
- Profession: Professor of Latin literature, University chancellor

Edwin Johannes Hildegard Linkomies (22 December 1894 – 9 September 1963, until 1928 Edwin Flinck) was Prime Minister of Finland from March 1943 to August 1944, and one of the seven politicians sentenced to five and a half years in prison as responsible for the Continuation War, on the demand of the Soviet Union. He was paroled in 1948. Linkomies was a prominent fennoman academic, pro-rector (administrative head) of the University of Helsinki 1932 to 1943, rector 1956 to 1962, and the government's Chancellor of the University from 1962 until his death.

== Biography ==
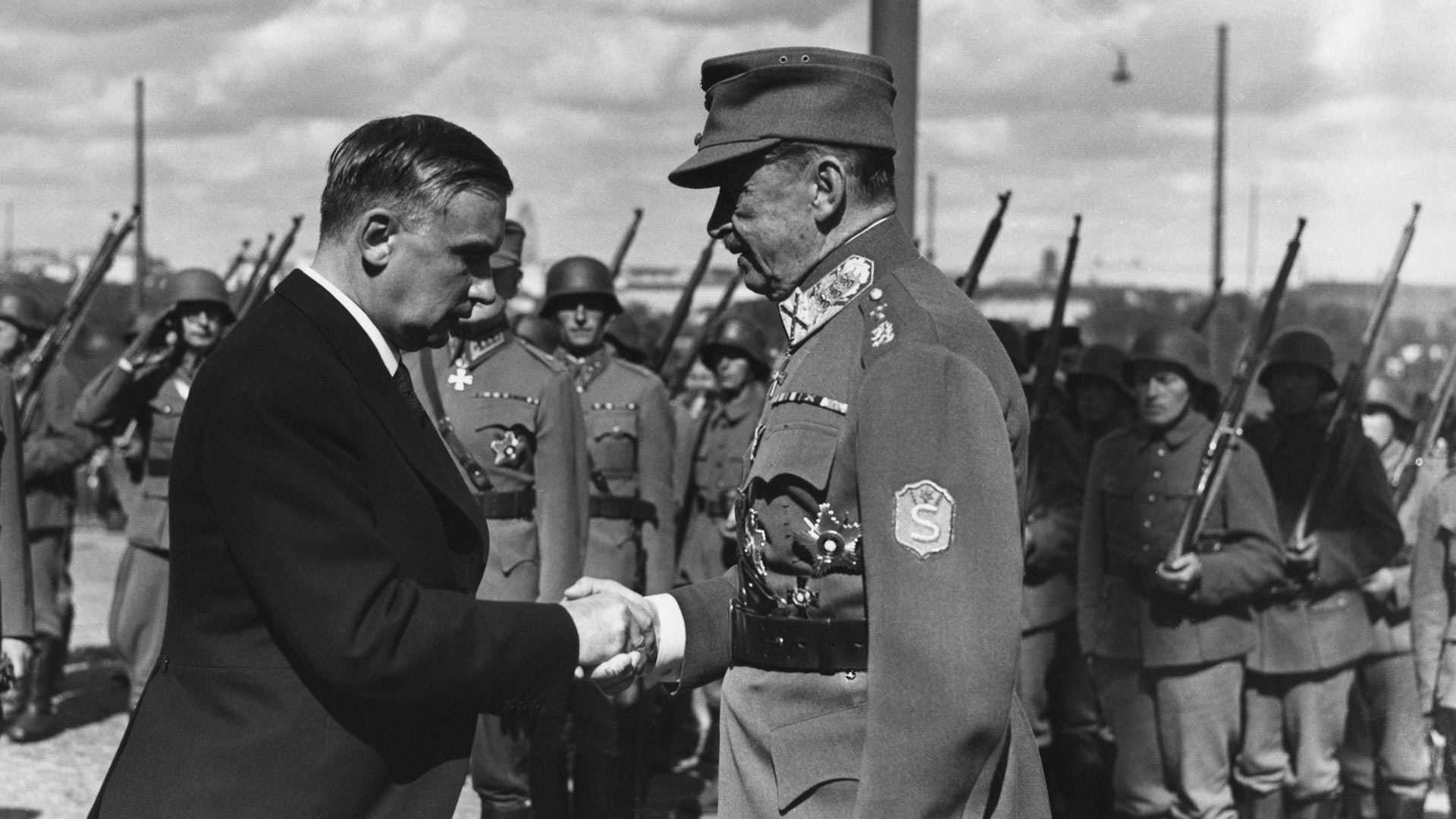
Marshal Mannerheim and Prime Minister Edwin Linkomies

Linkomies was born as Edwin Flinck in southeastern Finland's Viipuri, the son of a Swedish-Finnish officer who died soon after Edwin's birth, but Edwin grew up in western Finland at Rauma, in a mostly Finnish-speaking region of Finland. He had a quick and splendid career in academia: He graduated at age nineteen, wrote his dissertation at 22 at the University of Helsinki, where seven years later he was appointed professor and head of the department of Latin literature. Meanwhile, he had continued his research in Germany, at Leipzig and Halle. He would keep in close contact with German universities for the rest of his life; as a teacher and scientific leader he was known for his "Anglo-Saxon style" — clear and simplistic in his presentations, emphasizing the grand lines rather than intriguing details and exceptions — but also as demanding, authoritarian, keen of the dignity of his office, and maybe too self-confident.

Linkomies was, in many respects, the last of his kind. He was the last in a long line of prominent Finnish academics who were recruited from academia to important political tasks, the last to lecture in formal academic dress, and also the last to expect students and university employees to bow deeply to their rector.

Linkomies's ideologic development may for later generations seem remarkable, but among his contemporaries it was not unheard of to have been ardently nationalist, anti-Scandinavian, monarchy minded, anti-Socialist, and anti-democrat, only to shred these opinions one after another. His memoirs describes his astonishment over how the Socialist half of Finland's population turned out to be equally patriotic defenders as the non-Socialists after the Soviet Union's attack in November 1939. According to his own account, he was also one of the first Finns to realize the troubling nature of the Nazis — at least among his fellow Conservatives.

During the interbellum, much of Linkomies's rhetoric and political energy was directed against the Swedish-speaking Finns, and the remnants of their privileges and dominance in Finnish society; but also against Sweden and Scandinavia, which he perceived as both too Socialist and too eager to dominate Finland. However, in the 1950s, after the disappointment over Sweden's limited support during the wars, he contributed energetically to inter-Nordic contacts and cultural exchange, and may be credited for the at least partial healing of the rupture between Conservatives in Finland and Scandinavia, that had its background in fennomania and the Åland Crisis.

An assessment of Linkomies's role as politician is complicated by the fact that he at, in at least two critical moments in Finland's history deliberately spoke and acted against his own conviction, if one is allowed to believe his account in his memoirs.

- In the early 1930s, he argues that his ambition was to steer Finland's Conservative party, Kokoomus, in democratic direction after its entanglement with the semi-fascist Lapua Movement. But in order to achieve this, he appeared to conform to the lesser evils of anti-parliamentarism, militant anti-Socialism, and authoritarianism.
- During the Continuation War, after the Wehrmacht’s defeat at Stalingrad, he was appointed prime minister with peace at the top of his agenda, but neither in deeds nor in words would the government led by him and president Ryti reveal this aim, fearing the majority of Finns were unprepared, and the German co-belligerent still too strong. Furthermore, he did not dare to establish contacts with the growing domestic opposition to the war, and only very cautiously and hesitantly with countries that probably would have been inclined to support the peace process, notably the United States, Sweden, and Britain, if they had had confidence in Finland's wish for peace.

== Cabinets ==
- Linkomies Cabinet

Political offices
Preceded by Johan Wilhelm Rangell	Prime Minister of Finland; 1943–1944	Succeeded by Antti Hackzell
