= Tyko Reinikka =

Finnish politician

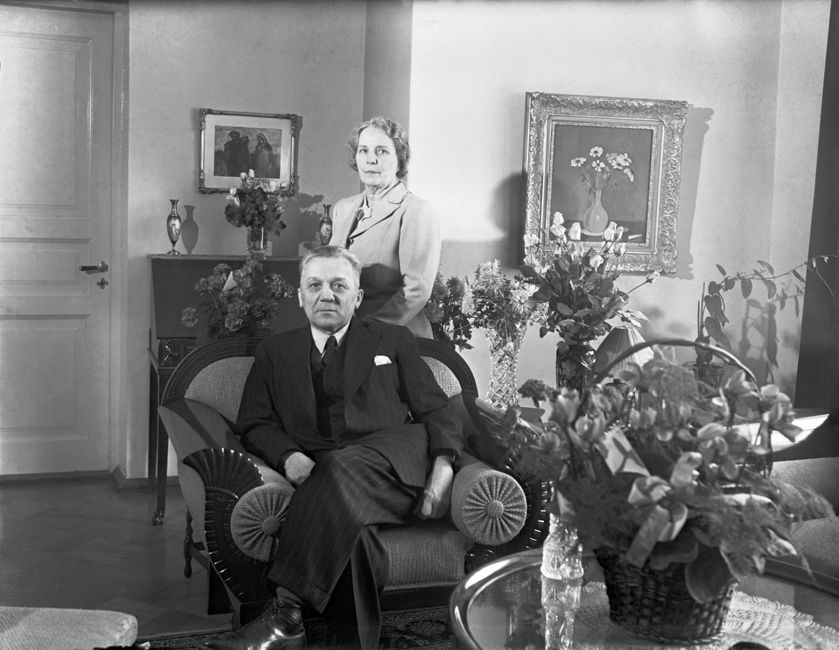
Tyko Reinikka in 1947

Tyko Henrik Reinikka (10 December 1887 – 18 January 1964) was a Finnish bank director and politician. He served as Minister of Trade and Industry from 31 December 1925 to 13 December 1926, Minister of Finance from 18 August 1929 to 4 July 1930, as Deputy Minister of Finance from 6 March to 7 October 1936 and again from 5 March 1943 to 8 August 1944. He was born in Oulu, and was a member of the Parliament of Finland from 1922 to 1930, representing the Agrarian League. As one of the accused in the war-responsibility trials, he was given a prison sentence of two years on 21 February 1946 because of his political role during the Continuation War. He was pardoned by President Paasikivi on 21 October 1947.
