= Sinikka Linkomies-Pohjala =

Finnish politician

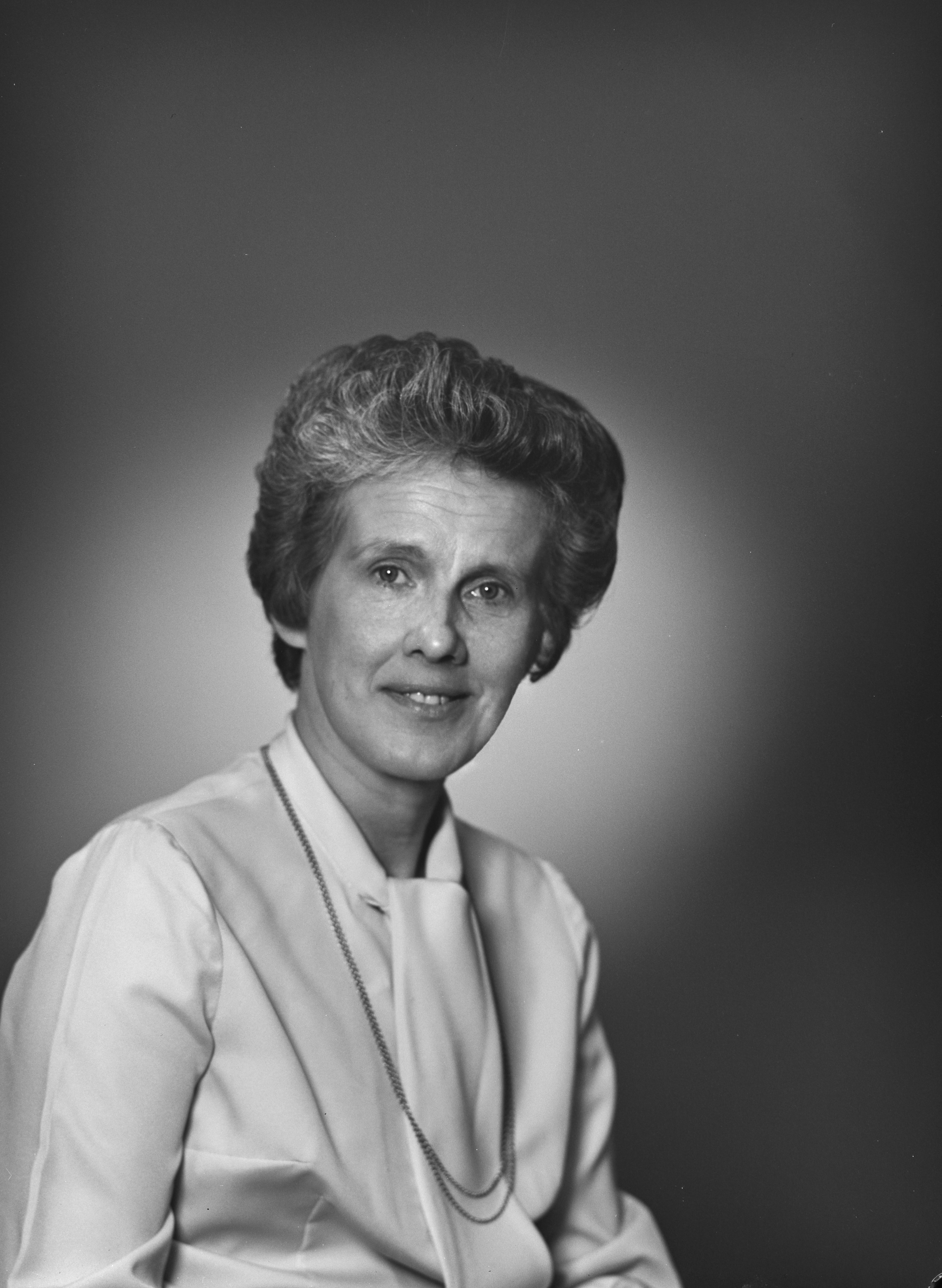
Sinikka Karhuvaara in 1979

Sinikka Linkomies-Pohjala (née Linkomies, later Karhuvaara; 1929, Helsinki – 2000, Pori) was a Finnish politician.

She graduated from the University of Helsinki with a master's degree in 1957, and went on to work as a Swedish language teacher for over a decade until 1969.

Linkomies-Pohjala served as a Member of Parliament for the Helsinki constituency, representing the National Coalition Party, from 1970 until 1983. She also sat on the Helsinki City Council 1973–1980.

Her father was the Prime Minister of Finland, Professor Edwin Linkomies. Her second husband was the MP Toivo Topias Pohjala.
