= War-responsibility trials in Finland =

1945-46 trial of Finnish leaders responsible for the Continuation War

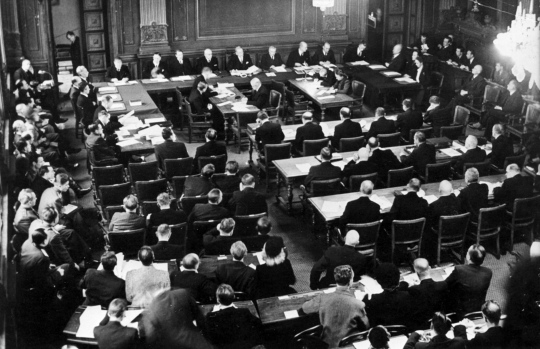
The trials were held in the House of the Estates

The war-responsibility trials in Finland (Finnish: Sotasyyllisyysoikeudenkäynti, Swedish: Krigsansvarighetsprocessen) were trials of the Finnish wartime leaders held responsible for "definitely influencing Finland in getting into a war with the Soviet Union and United Kingdom in 1941 or preventing peace" during the Continuation War, the Finnish term for their participation in the Second World War from 1941–1944. Unlike other World War II war-responsibility trials, the Finnish trials were not international. The trials were conducted from November 1945 through February 1946 by a special court consisting of the presidents of the Supreme Court of Finland, the Supreme Administrative Court of Finland, a professor from the University of Helsinki and twelve MPs appointed by the Parliament of Finland. The accused were convicted and imprisoned, but later paroled and pardoned.

== Background ==
The Moscow Armistice, signed September 19, 1944, contained the following Article 13:

Finland undertakes to collaborate with the Allied powers in the apprehension of persons accused of war crimes and in their trial.

The Finns initially thought that the trials would be for conventional war crimes. However, as the Moscow Declaration of October 30, 1943 made clear, the Allied powers intended to prosecute for other actions as well.

The Allied Control Commission and the Communist Party of Finland raised the issue of the trials repeatedly during the spring and summer of 1945. When the Treaty of London (London Charter) August 8, 1945 defined three types of crimes, war crimes, crimes against peace and crimes against humanity, it became evident that Finland could not be the only country fighting on the German side where leaders would not be convicted. On September 11, the parliament passed a law enabling prosecution of those responsible for war. The Supreme Court of Finland and leading judicial experts protested the law as conflicting with the constitution of Finland and contrary to Western judicial principles (it was designed to apply retroactively), but they did not comment on the political necessity of it. The Finnish public regarded it as a mockery of the rule of law. Juho Kusti Paasikivi, who was the prime minister of Finland at the time, is known to have stated that the conditions of the armistice concerning this matter disregarded all laws.

== The trial ==
The trials were conducted in Finland under Finnish (retroactive) law with Finnish judges. The law limited criminal liability to the highest leadership; only politicians and the Finnish war-time ambassador in Berlin, Toivo Mikael Kivimäki, were prosecuted. The consolidated trial started on November 15, 1945. The Allied Control Commission, which monitored the implementation of the armistice on behalf of the Allies, set up a committee to observe the trials and interfered on numerous occasions before the trials ended in February 1946.

=== The accused ===
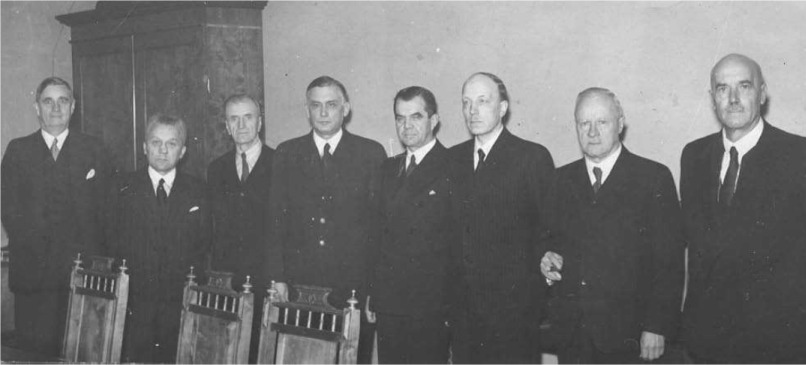
From the left: Henrik Ramsay, Tyko Reinikka, Antti Kukkonen, Edwin Linkomies, J.W. Rangell, Risto Ryti, Väinö Tanner and T.M. Kivimäki

Accused	Status	Punishment
Risto Ryti	5th President of Finland	10 years in prison
Jukka Rangell	25th Prime Minister of Finland	6 years in prison
Edwin Linkomies	28th Prime Minister of Finland	5 years and 6 months in prison
Väinö Tanner	Cabinet minister	5 years and 6 months in prison
Toivo Kivimäki	Finland's ambassador to Nazi Germany	5 years in prison
Henrik Ramsay	Cabinet minister	2 years and 6 months in prison
Antti Kukkonen	Cabinet minister	2 years in prison
Tyko Reinikka	Cabinet minister	2 years in prison

On the negotiations between the leadership of the Communist Party of Finland and Andrei Zhdanov, the chairman of Allied Control Commission the question of removal of Väinö Tanner, the chairman of the Social Democratic Party, was raised. In his private notes Zhdanov wrote: "If Tanner is removed, the Social Democratic Party will shatter..." thus opening the road to Communist control of the left.

== Reactions to the trial ==
Most Finns rejected the legitimacy of the trial, because ex post facto law was against the Finnish Constitution, and because only Finnish leaders, and not the Soviet leaders who had ordered the invasion of Finland in 1939, were held accountable for the charge of aggressive war. The lack of public support for the proceedings led to the Finnish government paroling and pardoning each of the defendants who was sentenced to imprisonment.

The question as to whether Finnish officials had known about the extermination of the Jews, in the course of their collaboration with Nazi Germany, was not raised in the trial. While Finland managed to prevent the deportation and murder of almost all of its Jews during the war, the question as to whether the Finnish state knew about the Holocaust continues to be controversial inside the country.

President Paasikivi complained to his aide that the convictions handed down in the Trials were one of the biggest stumbling blocks to improving relations between Finland and the Soviet Union.

== Aftermath ==
After the Paris Peace treaty was ratified in the Soviet Union August 29, 1947, the Allied Control Commission left Finland on September 26, 1947. President Paasikivi paroled Kukkonen and Reinikka in October and Ramsay in December when they had served five-sixths of their sentences. The rest were granted parole in accordance with Finnish criminal law when they had served half of their sentences. On May 19, 1949 Paasikivi pardoned Ryti, who was hospitalized (his health collapsed during the imprisonment and he remained an invalid until his death in 1956). He also pardoned Rangell, Tanner, Linkomies, and Kivimäki, who were still on parole. That day, Paasikivi wrote in his diary: "[It was] ... the most noble deed, I have participated in, in the last five years."

== See also ==
- Crime against peace
- Kellogg–Briand Pact, a treaty of international law renouncing war signed by Finland.
- Legal purge in Norway after World War II
- Nuremberg trials
- Nuremberg principles
- Post-World War II Romanian war crime trials
- Show trial
