= Risto Ryti =

Finnish politician (1889–1956)

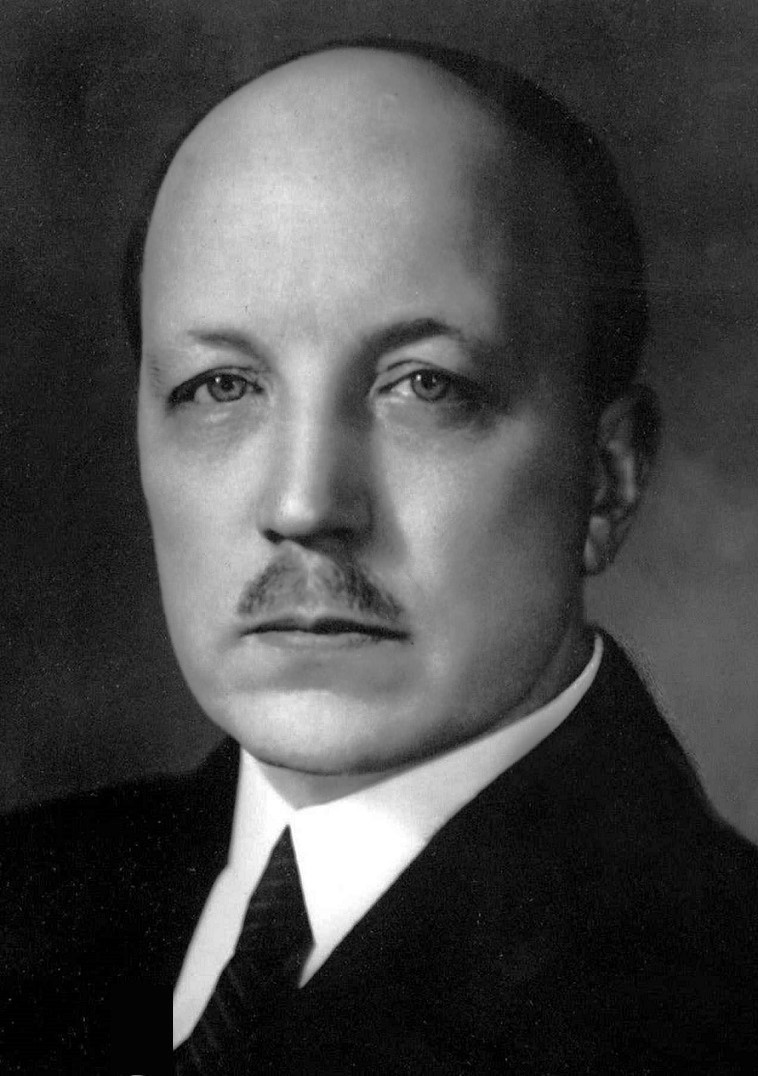
- Portrait c. 1943–1944

5th President of Finland
- In office 19 December 1940 – 4 August 1944
- Prime Minister: Jukka Rangell; Edwin Linkomies
- Preceded by: Kyösti Kallio
- Succeeded by: Gustaf Mannerheim

14th Prime Minister of Finland
- In office 1 December 1939 – 19 December 1940
- President: Kyösti Kallio
- Preceded by: Aimo Cajander
- Succeeded by: Jukka Rangell

Minister of Finance
- In office 14 November 1922 – 18 January 1924
- Prime Minister: Kyösti Kallio
- Preceded by: Ernst Gråsten
- Succeeded by: Hugo Relander
- In office 9 April 1921 – 2 June 1922
- Prime Minister: Juho Vennola
- Preceded by: Jonathan Wartiovaara
- Succeeded by: Ernst Gråsten

Personal details
- Born: Risto Heikki Ryti; 3 February 1889 Huittinen, Grand Duchy of Finland, Russian Empire
- Died: 25 October 1956 (aged 67) Helsinki, Finland
- Party: National Progressive
- Spouse: Gerda Ryti (née Serlachius)
- Children: Henrik Ryti; Niilo Ryti; Eva Saxén (née Ryti)
- Risto Ryti's voice Announcing the Continuation War; Recorded 26 June 1941

Risto Heikki Ryti (Finnish pronunciation: [ˈristo ˈhei̯kːi ˈryti]; 3 February 1889 – 25 October 1956) was a Finnish politician who served as the president of Finland from 1940 to 1944. Ryti started his career as a politician in the field of economics and as a political background figure during the interwar period. He made a wide range of international contacts in the world of banking and within the framework of the League of Nations. Ryti served as prime minister during the Winter War and the Interim Peace, and as president during the Continuation War.

Ryti penned the 1944 Ryti–Ribbentrop Agreement – named after himself and Joachim von Ribbentrop – a personal letter to Nazi German Führer Adolf Hitler whereby Ryti agreed not to reach a separate peace in the Continuation War against the Soviet Union without approval from Nazi Germany, in order to secure German military aid to stop the Soviet Vyborg–Petrozavodsk Offensive against Finland. His resignation soon afterwards allowed his successor, Carl Gustaf Emil Mannerheim, to bypass the agreement and make peace with the Soviet Union once the offensive had been stopped.

After the war, Ryti was the main defendant in the Finnish war-responsibility trials (1945–1946), which resulted in his conviction for crimes against peace. He was sentenced to ten years' imprisonment but was pardoned by decision of President Juho Kusti Paasikivi in 1949. His reputation was largely unscathed, but his health had suffered and he never returned to public life.

== Early life and career ==
Risto Ryti was born in Huittinen, Satakunta, one of seven sons, among 10 siblings. His parents were Kaarle Evert Ryti (formerly Yli-Mauriala), a farmer, and Ida Vivika Junttila. Although he came from a peasant farming background, during his childhood Ryti hardly participated in work on the family's large farm, being a bookish and academically inclined boy. He was educated briefly at Pori Grammar School, and was then tutored at home, before enrolling in the University of Helsinki in 1906 to study law. Ryti was the only one among his brothers to pass the university entrance examination; however his three sisters also matriculated.

Ryti graduated in autumn 1909 as Finland was moving into the second period of Russification. Escaping an oppressive political atmosphere in the capital, Ryti returned to his roots in Satakunta, where he established himself as a lawyer in Rauma. During this period he became acquainted with Alfred Kordelin, one of Finland's richest men. Ryti became Kordelin's lawyer, and eventually the two men became close friends. During this period Ryti also undertook further studies, becoming a Master of Laws in 1912. In the spring of 1914 he moved to Oxford to study maritime law, but the outbreak of World War I forced him to return to Finland. In 1916 he married Gerda Paula Serlachius (1886–1984). They had three children, Henrik (1916–2002), Niilo (1919–1997), and Eva (1922–2009).

In the period after the outbreak of World War I, before Finland achieved its independence, Ryti's business relationship with Kordelin grew even closer, and it appeared likely that Kordelin would ask Ryti to become general manager of his numerous business enterprises. However, in November 1917 Ryti and his wife witnessed the murder of Kordelin at the hands of a Russian Bolshevik. Russian seamen led by a Finnish tailor took Kordelin's party hostage, with the intent to rob them. Ryti, Kordelin's lawyer, refused to legally authorize the robbery despite being threatened at gunpoint. Armed White Guard soldiers were however present and the situation deteriorated into a gunfight. 20 people including Kordelin were killed. Ryti was saved by a malfunction in the enemy's firearm.

== Politician and banker ==
=== Member of parliament and finance minister ===
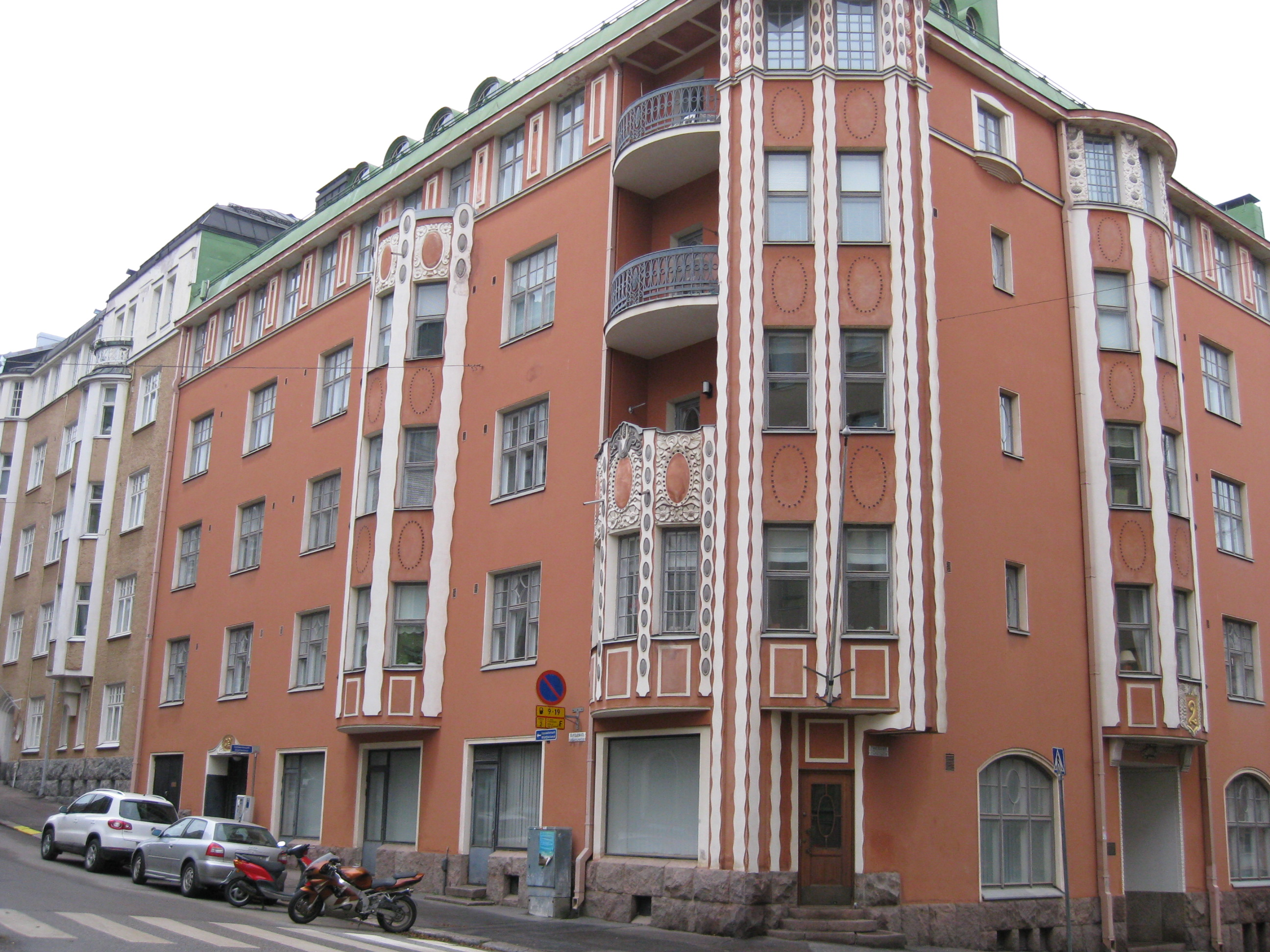
Ryti's home in Helsinki 1918-35

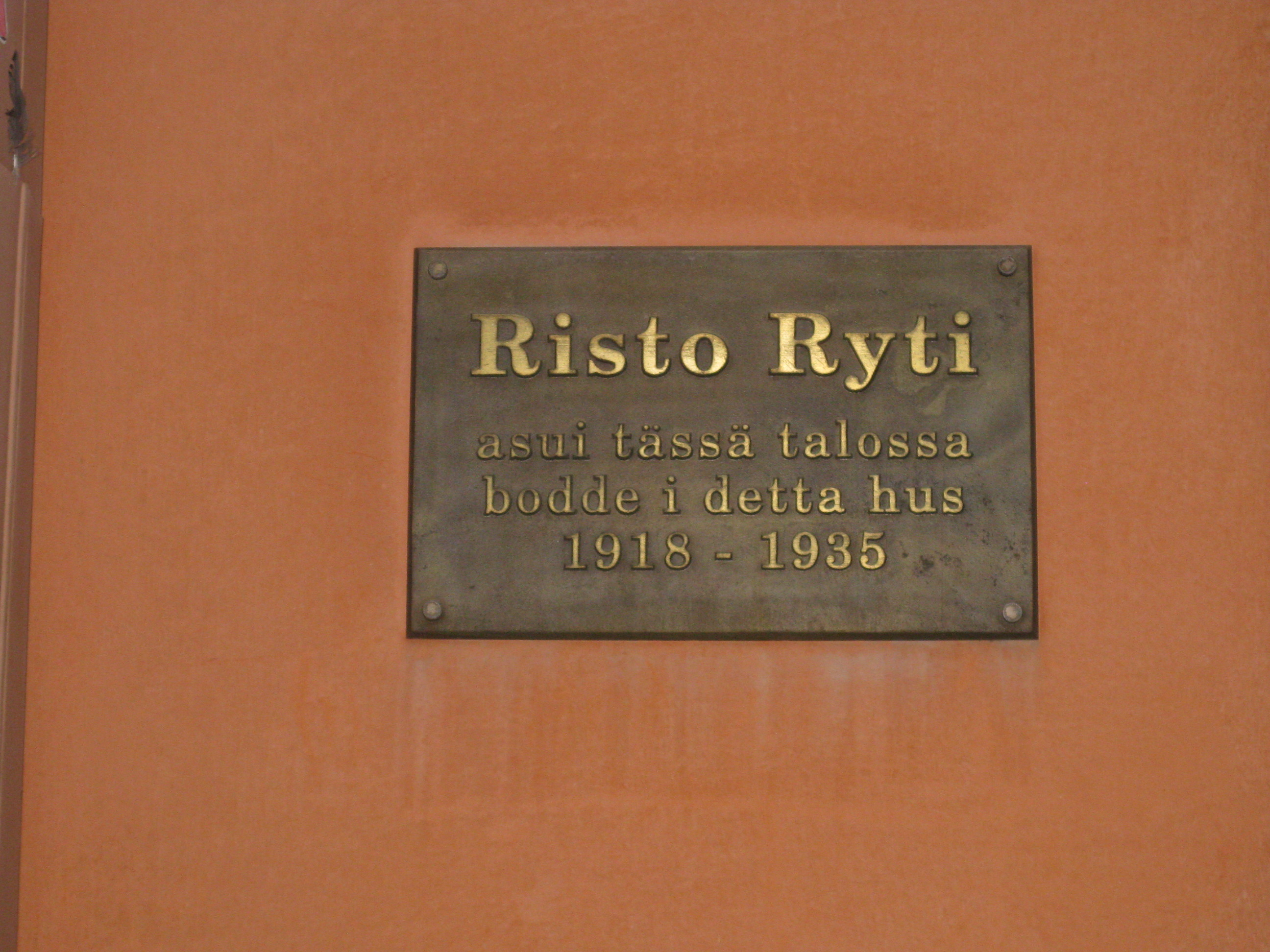
Plaque on the above building

During the Finnish Civil War Ryti played no active part, remaining in hiding with his family in Red-dominated Helsinki. Afterwards, however, he would become deeply involved in politics, being elected a National Progressive member of Parliament in 1919, at the age of thirty the second youngest member. In the same year, the party candidate, an admirer of Ryti, Kaarlo Juho Ståhlberg, was elected the first president of Finland. Ryti served as a member of Parliament from 1919 to 1924 and from 1927 to 1929. During his first few years in Parliament, Ryti served as chairman of the Judiciary Committee, and later the Finance Committee. He also served as a member of Helsinki City Council from 1924 to 1927.

According to the Finnish historian Martti Turtola, Ryti succeeded in politics in the first few years after the Finnish Civil War because his liberal, democratic, and republican ideals were popular then. Moreover, Ryti's personal political success continued even after his liberal-oriented National Progressive Party shrank to a fringe party, because he was considered an expert especially in economic policy and, very importantly, an impartial servant of the fatherland who refused to play partisan politics (see Martti Turtola, Risto Ryti: A Life for the Fatherland).

In 1921, the thirty-two-year-old Ryti was appointed finance minister in the government of Juho Vennola. He served in that position twice until 1924. In 1923 President Kaarlo Juho Ståhlberg appointed him governor of the Bank of Finland, a post he remained in until he became prime minister in 1939. Ryti only began to exercise his duties as chairman of the Bank of Finland after he resigned as finance minister in January 1924. During his early years in parliament, Ryti succeeded in bringing order to the government budget. Although he was a Ståhlbergian, Ryti did not approve of pardoning Red prisoners. In his opinion, the Reds were criminals. Ryti refused to see the social background of the Finnish Civil War.

=== Governor of the national bank ===
In 1925 Ryti was nominated by the national progressives as their candidate in that years presidential election at the age of 36. In the second round of voting, he received the most support. However, in the third round the Swedish People's Party, which held the balance, moved their votes to Lauri Kristian Relander, and Ryti lost to Relander by 109 votes to 172. Ryti's support increased over the years but was never enough in elections. During the 1930s he withdrew from daily politics, but influenced economic policies. Ryti was an orthodox supporter of classical liberal economics. He made his goal to tie the value of Finnish markka to the gold standard. Unlike many other European countries, Finland did not choose deflationary solutions under his leadership; and in 1926 the country shifted to the gold markka. However, after the Great Depression in 1929, Finland was forced to abandon the gold standard following the example of Great Britain.

In the 1920s, Ryti established international contacts with the banking world of Scandinavia, and with Great Britain and the United States. The Wall Street Journal recognized his success. In 1934 he was awarded a British honour, being created a Knight Commander of the Royal Victorian Order (KCVO) due to his great merits in Anglo-Finnish relations. He had excellent relations with the leaders of the Bank of England, due to his similar economic policies, such as the belief in the gold standard until the Great Depression, and due to his excellent command of English. In fact, Ryti could regularly telephone the Bank of England's leaders when he wanted to discuss economic or financial policies with them (see Martti Turtola, "Risto Ryti: A Life for the Fatherland"). Ryti participated in the activities of the League of Nations as a member of many committees dealing with economic questions and monetary policy.

In the politics of the 1930s, Ryti was an important background figure. His social policy was two-minded. Ryti opposed work programmes for the unemployed and spending on assistance for poor. On the other hand, he thought that the benefits of the strong economics should be distributed evenly over the whole population, not just a few. Ryti played an important part in creating the social welfare of the late 1930s. In general, Ryti was opposed to state intervention in business and industry. He opposed Socialist economics and especially its Soviet forms. Furthermore, Ryti had experienced the Russification period and the Civil War, making him anti-Soviet. Ryti approved of neither German national socialism nor right-wing extremism, and he also opposed the Lapua movement. Ryti was an admirer of British civilisation and culture and of American free enterprise.

== Prime minister and president ==
=== Ryti–Tanner government during the Winter War ===
Ryti had built up relations of trust with leading Social Democratic Party politician Väinö Tanner and President Kyösti Kallio. In late autumn 1939, Ryti was offered the post of prime minister, but he tried to turn down the offer. However, when the Winter War broke out on 30 November, Ryti agreed. He took his post on 1 December. Ryti concentrated on a realistic analysis of the situation, instead of pessimism or over-optimism. He and foreign minister Tanner agreed that the war must be brought to an end as quickly as possible. They both spoke fluent English and had close contact with the Western powers.

At the beginning of the war, the Soviet Union formed a puppet government and cut connections with the Ryti–Tanner government. The Finnish Army fought defensively in battles during December 1939 through February 1940. This gained time and freedom for diplomatic manoeuvering. The Soviet Union was forced to drop the Terijoki Government and accept negotiations via Stockholm. The Western allies' planned intervention influenced the Soviet government to seek an agreement. Ryti persuaded the rest of the cabinet to settle for peace and signed the Moscow Peace Treaty on 13 March 1940. The peace agreement, in which Finland lost large land areas and faced the burden of resettling 400,000 refugees, was generally considered crushing.

=== From prime minister to president ===
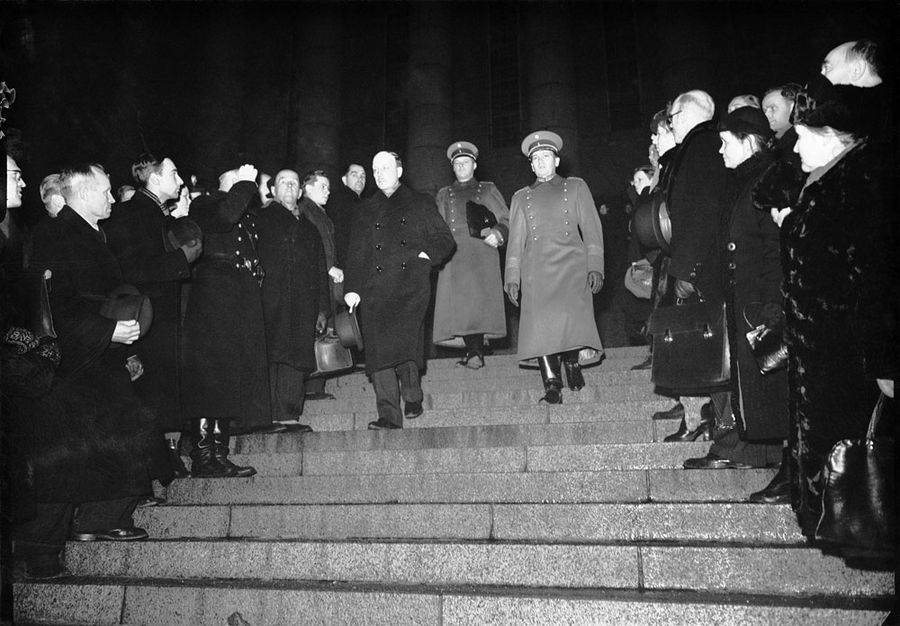
Having given the solemn oath on 19 December 1940, Ryti leaves the parliament alone. His predecessor, Kallio, suffered a heart attack and died the same day.

Ryti had proved to be a strong prime minister, in contrast to his predecessor Aimo Cajander. President Kallio suffered a stroke in August, and also he had no great experience in foreign policy, so the heavy responsibilities of state leadership were shared by Ryti, Field Marshal C.G.E. Mannerheim, industrialist and general Rudolf Walden, and Tanner. Considering this and the fact Ryti had signed the peace treaty, Ryti became an acceptable figure for the post of president in December 1940 when Kallio resigned.

The exceptional circumstances, such as the lack of a permanent place of residence for many Karelian refugees (see Turtola, "Risto Ryti: A Life for the Fatherland" and Virkkunen, "The Finnish Presidents II"), prevented the election of presidential electors, so a constitutional amendment was enacted by the parliament to enable the electors of 1937 to elect a successor to Kallio. Ryti was chosen with 288 votes out of 300.

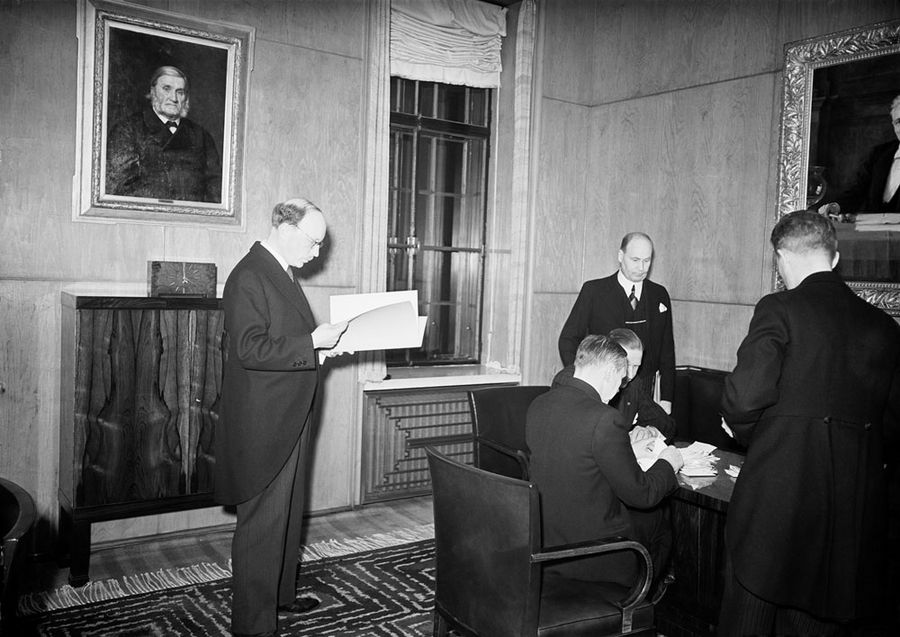
The newly elected President Ryti checks the election proceedings in the parliament.

On the day of his retirement, 19 December 1940, Kallio suffered a fatal heart attack during a farewell gathering; on the same day, Ryti became the holder of the presidency. (Note: Kallio's presidency of the republic was to officially end at the inauguration of Ryti, who was elected to succeed him, at which time Ryti's presidency was formally set to begin.)

=== Towards German orientation ===
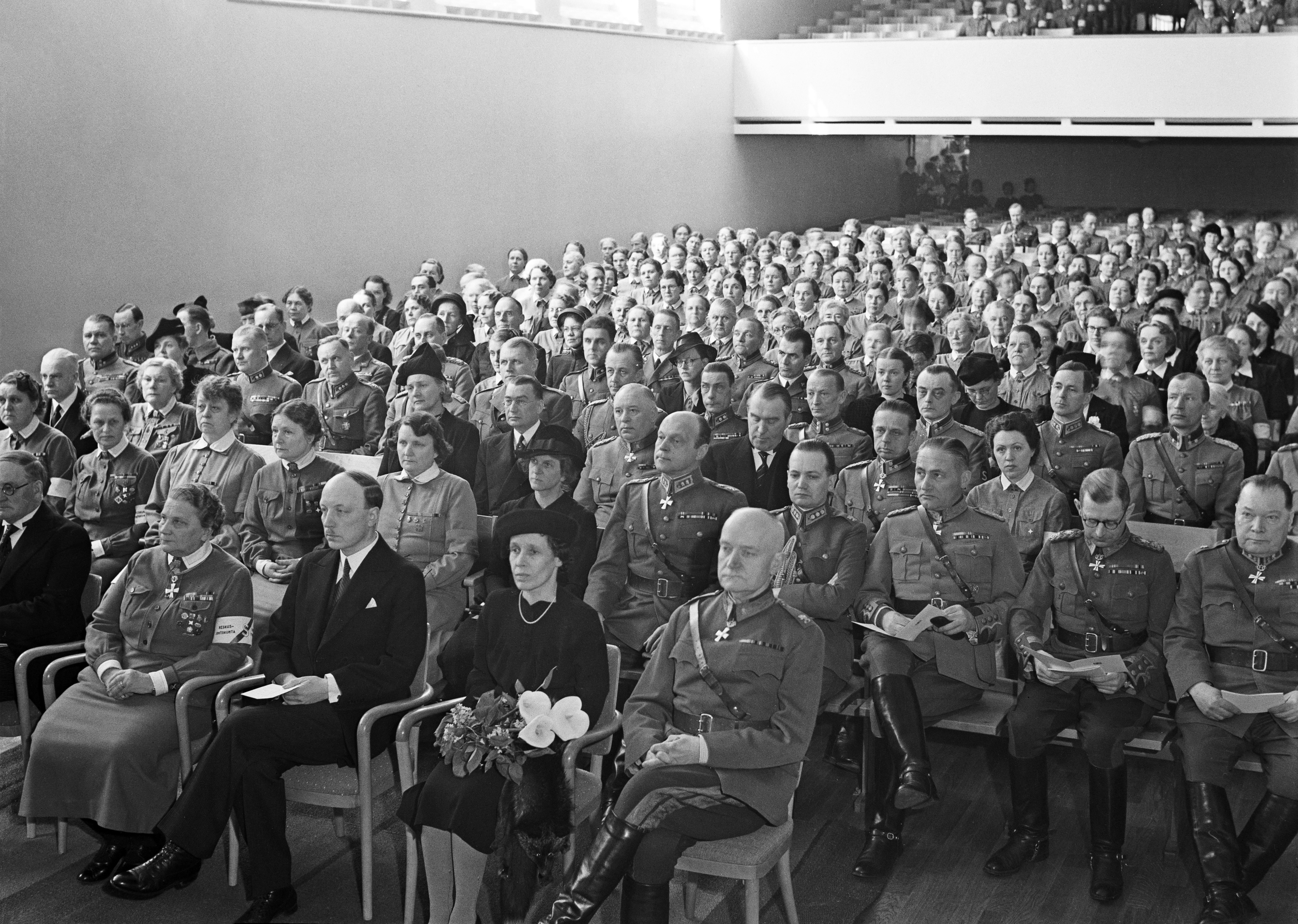
Celebration of 20 years of the Lotta Svärd Organisation, 27 February 1941. Ryti is sat photo right of Fanni Luukkonen and in front of Helmi Arneberg-Pentti and Tyra Wadner

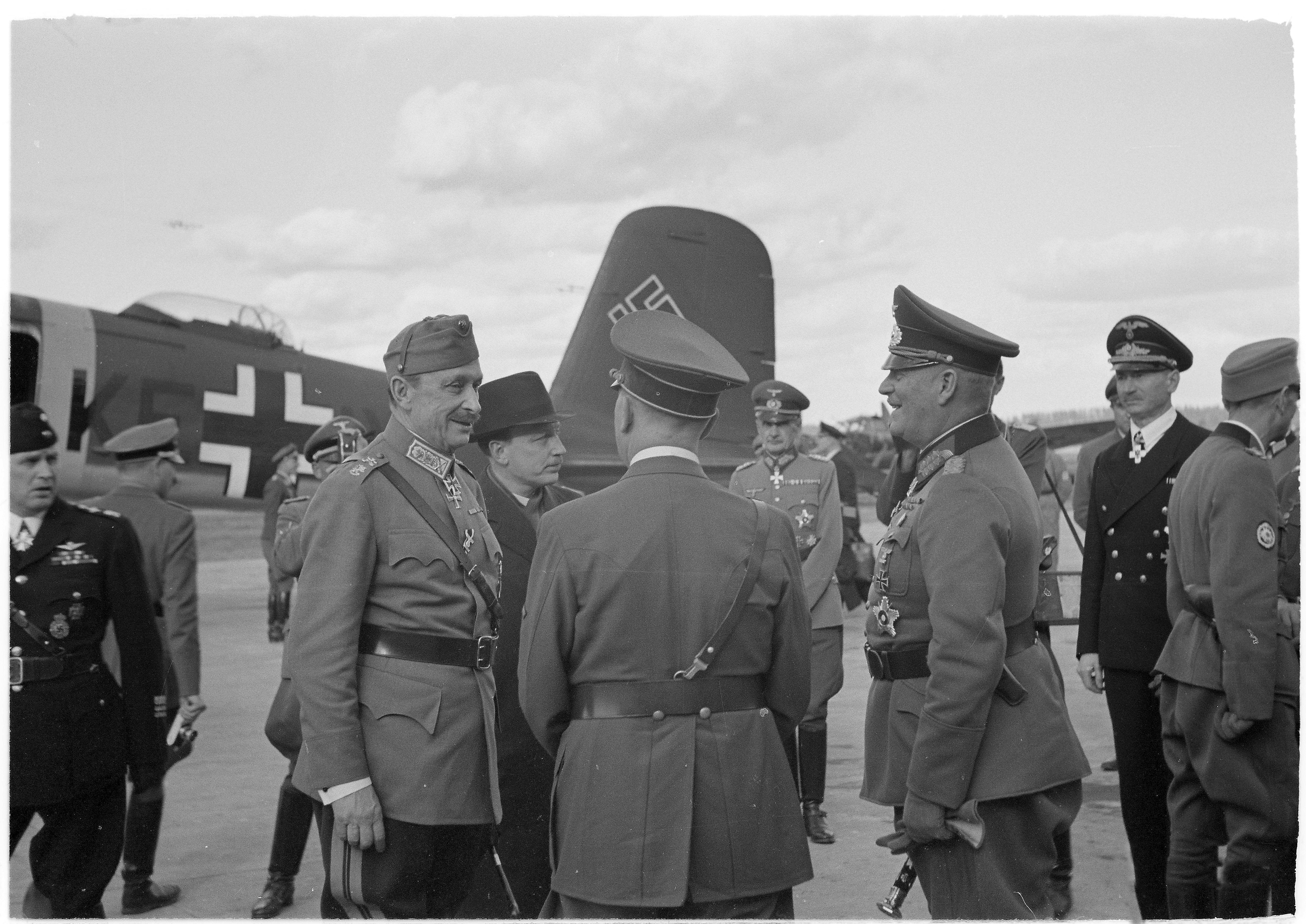
Ryti, Mannerheim and German field marshal Wilhelm Keitel

Finland's changed policy from a Scandinavian orientation up to, and during, the Winter War, to a German orientation after the Winter War, was not in the least pursued by the confirmed Anglophile Risto Ryti. He had no illusions about the true nature of Germany. Traditionally Finland had been associated with Britain by stronger commercial ties, but as the Baltic Sea was dominated by the Germans and Soviets, lost markets had to be found elsewhere, and the Germans were willing to trade.

In August 1940 Ryti also agreed to secret military cooperation with Germany. Over time it became increasingly likely that the peace between Germany and the Soviet Union would end, and the experts' opinion - even among the enemies of Germany - was that in case of invasion the Soviets could not stop the German war machine. Ryti apparently turned, step by step, to being in favour of seizing the opportunity to secure Finnish claims to areas he saw to be in the country's interests, in case the great realignment of ownership of East European territory by force were to materialize.

Thus the cooperation begun in late 1940 ultimately developed in 1941 into preparations for re-annexation of the territories lost after the Winter War, in case Nazi Germany were to realize the rumoured plans for an assault on the Soviet Union. The Continuation War, when it commenced, would also come to include occupation of East Karelia, which nationalist circles had championed since the 1910s.

== Continuation War ==
=== Early success and second term ===
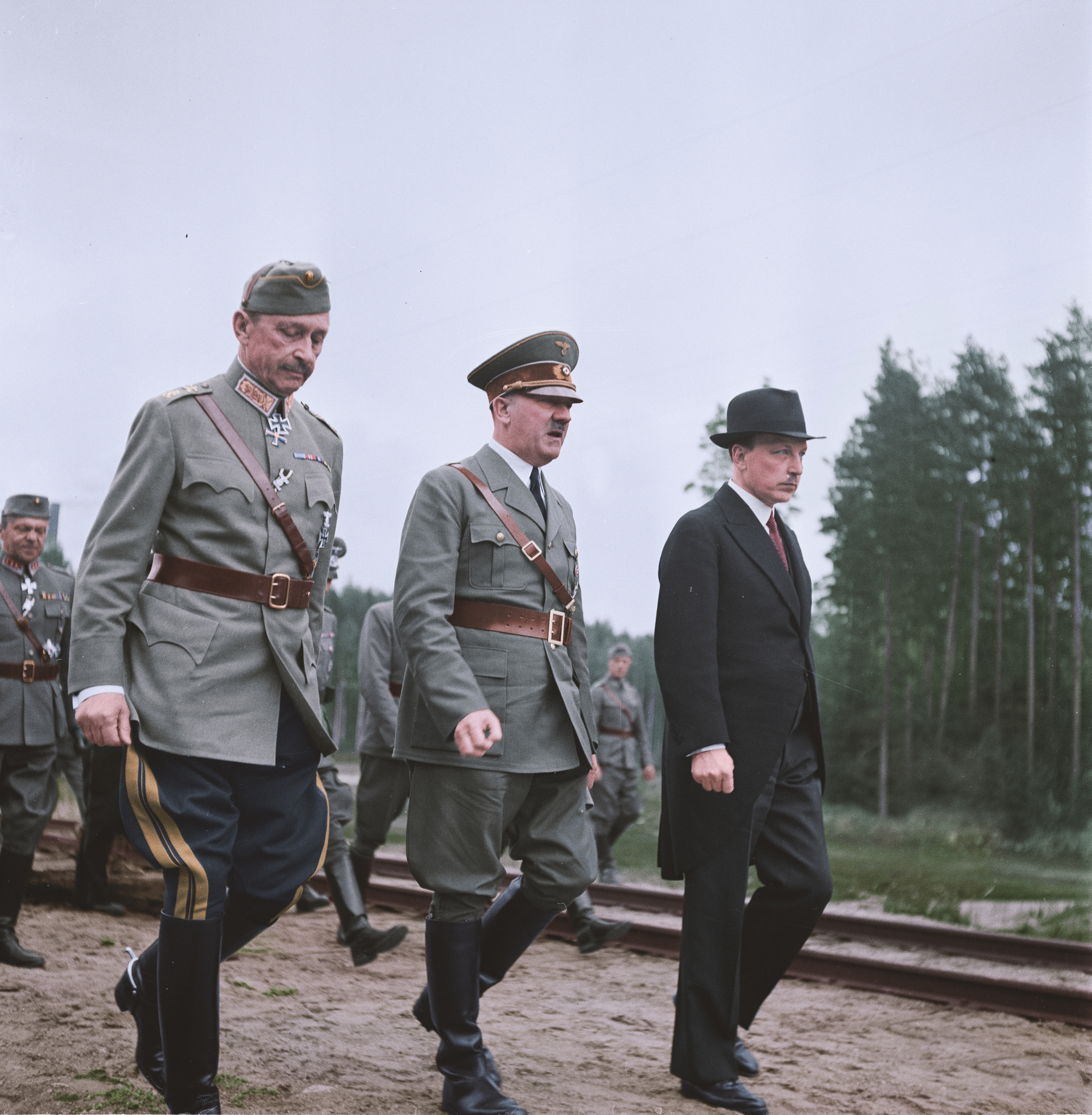
Mannerheim, Adolf Hitler and Ryti in Finland in 1942. Hitler visited on Mannerheim's 75th birthday.

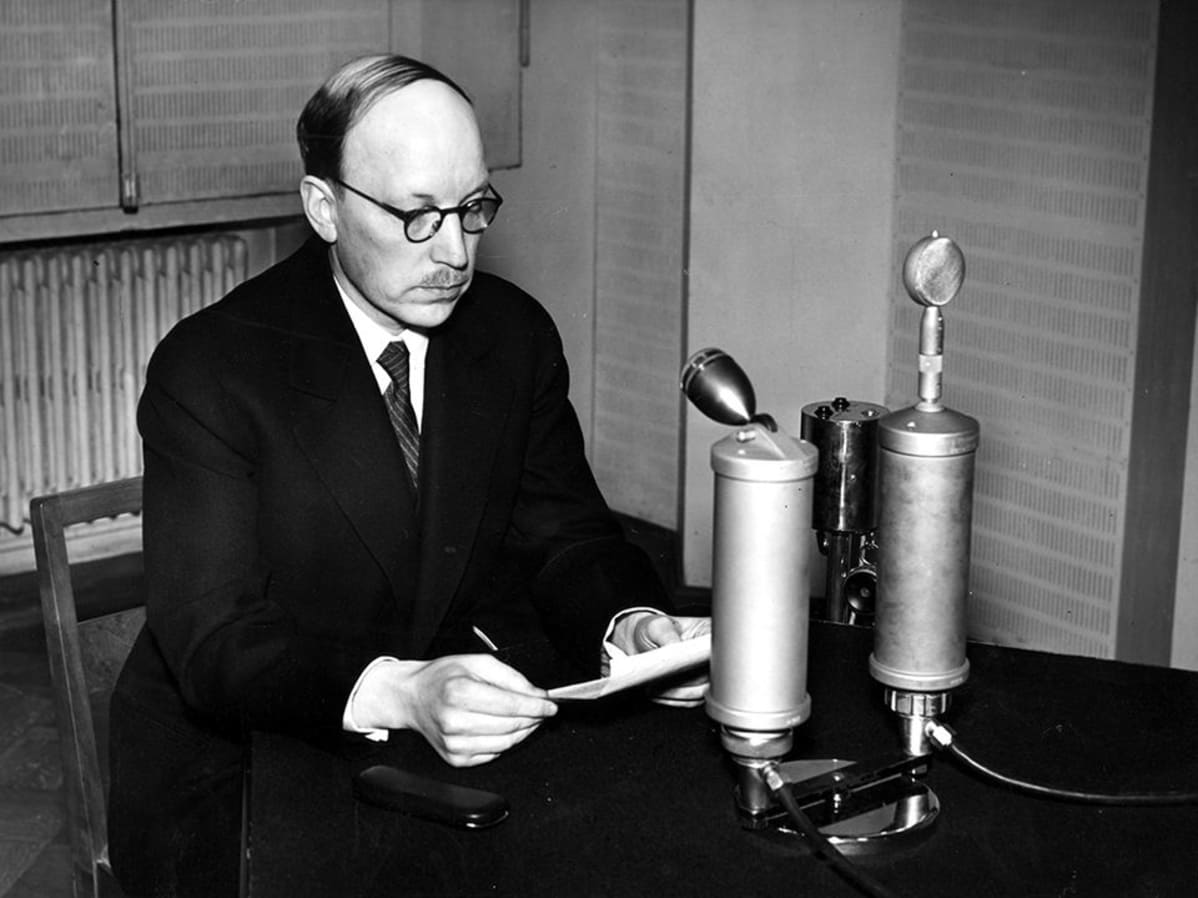
President Ryti giving his famous radio speech about the Continuation War on 26 June 1941.

When Germany's assault on the Soviet Union began in June 1941, Finland remained formally neutral until Soviet air raids gave an expected reason to fulfill the invasion plans some days later. Ryti made his famous radio speech after the outbreak of the Continuation War where he announced that Germany would win the war against the Soviet Union:

Citizens!

Our peace loving people, which for more than a year have strained to utmost to once again rebuild their country to flourish in the aftermath of the previous war, has once again been made the target of vicious attack. Once again has the same enemy, during which in excess of half a millennium has over short intervals in total for some 100 years by ravaging, shattering, and murdering waged wars against our small nation, violated our territory, with their air arms slaying peaceful citizens, mainly the aged, women and children, and destroying the property of peaceful citizens.

From the instant of commencement of hostilities between Germany and Soviet Union, numerous instances of border violations have been committed by the Soviet Union, for which we have expressed our most vigorous protests, all to no avail. As of yesterday the military forces of Soviet Union have without regard to agreements and without any cause being supplied by us, committed on the orders of their government regular, wide-scale military operations in all regions of our country, and in keeping with their habits, primarily targeted these operations towards sparsely populated areas and peaceful civilian population.

In this manner has commenced our second battle for defence only some 19 months since occurrence of the previous attack. This new attack towards Finland is as if it were a culmination point for that mode of politics which the Soviet Union has ever since the Moscow peace settlement utilized towards Finland, and the purpose of which has been the destruction of our independence and enslavement of our people.

Having been left wanting for military assistance during the 1939-40 winter war, we had no choice except for during the dark moments of night on the March 13th conclude peace with Soviet Union, which after the successful defensive battles conducted with substantial casualties felt paralyzing to us. From the terms of peace we were able to perceive the ultimate intentions of USSR in dictating these terms. The new boundary was ordered to be such, as to destroy the possibility of Finland defending itself. The border was to run across natural lines of defence and in such manner that road network was disabled. In making the peace, the USSR obtained a starting point that from the military point of view was advantageous in case of renewed warlike attacks.

That, however, is not all. In order to totally deprive Finland of any defensive capacity against attack by their immense military forces, the Soviet Union demands both the naval base of Hanko as well as building of the Salla railway.

The argument for renting of Hanko base has been stated as being that, the Soviet Union must have this key area of the Gulf of Finland in order to secure the safety of their large seaside city of Leningrad.

The Hanko based troops do not, however, indicate seaborne battle capacity, in as much as attack capacity, and in particular, land-based attack. A sea battle does not require large armored tank troops or enormous railway-based artillery. The Hanko based troops principally were of those assembled for rapid attack occurring on land. Hanko is like a pistol aimed directly at heart of Finland.

Neither the demand for construction of Salla railway nor North-east Finland area secession demands were included in the advance notification of terms of peace which were bough to notice of Finnish cabinet. The railway of Salla, by which it is intended to join the railway network of Finland to the Murmansk railway, in all probability would leave a new route of attack being available to USSR. Threat of this demand for railway encompasses the entire Northern Scandinavia, but is in the first instance a dagger aimed at Finland’s back.

During the peace negotiations Soviet Union notified as final and absolute point of view that the reached agreement fully meets the demands of USSR. Representatives of the Soviet Union considered it to guarantee the safety of Leningrad, enabling the security of which was notified as being the reason for commencement of hostilities. Likewise, the Russian negotiators assured the peace agreement guarantees safety of the railway running North-west of Lake Ladoga, which the USSR considered to be important for their network.

Additionally, the negotiators assured that how Finland arranges and decides their internal as well as external political matters is entirely dependent on it, as well as is how it arranges its fiscal policy. The Soviet Union has no interest in these matters.

Even though us Finnish have had painful experiences regarding how little both the man’s word as well as the agreements given by the USSR means, we would have expected that their words would have been at least binding at basic points, and at the very least for a short while.

However, once again we have directly come to realize that no word given by the USSR can be relied upon. Regardless of what had been promised regarding intervention in Finland’s foreign policy, the Soviet Union bought forward demands regarding direction of Finland’s foreign policy.

After the concluded severe battles, considerable losses and wanting for assistance of field equipment; our country was totally defenseless against possible further attacks by Soviet Union. In order of safeguarding to at least some measure the existence of our country, the cabinet of Finland commenced talks designed to achieve formation of a Northern League of Defence. These discussions were made public on the same day as the peace agreement had been concluded in Moscow. While the articles of the peace agreement were being dealt with by Finnish parliament on March 21st the USSR in Moscow made known their strict opposition to this plan, totally without foundation claiming it to be in disagreement with the peace agreement.

In respect of the same foreign policy matter the Soviet Union further three times with threatening note intervened in our right of self determination: on the 27th of September 1940, on our independence day of the same year, and two weeks following that, on the December 18. This occurred regardless of the above mentioned idea of League of Defence not by any means being aimed against anybody, merely to safeguard these sister nations.

In contravention of international covenants and practices, Soviet Union’s diplomatic and consular representation in Finland has undertaken intervention with regard to Finland’s domestic situation as well as spying, even appearing for this purpose with a false name.

With regard to this matter, the staff numbers at USSR representative office have increased more than substantially. At the Helsinki mission, there are 31 diplomatic corps staff and 120 assisting staff. At the Consulate in Petsamo, 3 consular staff and 21 assistance staff, at Mariehamn 8 consular staff and 30 other staff. In total there have been some 42 diplomatic and consular staff and 171 assistant staff employed at the USSR mission.

With the aid of their mission, as well as by utilizing the assistance of those citizens of Finland who have been agreeable to exchange their country for the silver coins of Judas, the USSR has unscrupulously attempted to interfere with Finland’s internal affairs. By supporting and financing Finland – Soviet Union Friendship Association’s subversive and revolutionary actions, which were in a matter-of-fact way being led and incited from Moscow, Soviet Union endeavored to instill similar developments in Finland, which it has achieved in the Baltic countries.

The Soviet Union has even undertaken attempts to interfere in internal staff matters and apply pressure in these matters. The propaganda and spying by Soviet Union within Finland become ever more unscrupulous and active. Every Finnish citizen who the Soviets have managed to get hold of, prisoners of war included, has been either tried to be enlisted or forced to undertake spying against Finland.

Soviet Union’s propaganda has inspired feelings of hate towards cabinet of Finland and members of government. It has tried to spread Bolshevism and Bolshevik style thinking in Finland.

The latest example of Soviet Union’s continuously in ever differing situations shown disrespect is the recent proposal originating from Soviet Union’s official sources, that a certain person convicted in connection of the largest instance of spying in Finland and currently serving the sentence, would be freed and permitted do depart for Soviet Union.

Soviet Union’s political and fiscal demands over and above those stated in the peace terms extended to many different matters and become from Finland’s security point of view ever increasingly precarious. I will mention a few of these.

On Midsummer’s eve last year Soviet Union surprisingly opened the matter of Åland, which was not included in the peace agreement documents. When this was pointed out as a way of warding off the demand, Commissioner for Foreign Affairs Molotov cynically announced that the Soviet cabinet had not bought the matter of the Åland Islands forward in connection of peacemaking because this may have disturbingly affected the peace negotiations.

The Soviet Union now demanded that the Åland Islands had to be demilitarized, defense equipment located there destroyed, and Soviet Union itself had to be permitted to control all works of destruction. With these demands the Soviet Union clearly wanted to reserve itself the opportunity to effortlessly occupy the Åland Islands, whenever a suitable moment occurred.

During same timeframe, approximately a year ago, Soviet Union stated their demands for nickel mines of Petsamo. It was not satisfied with demanding a share of the mines production, but its demands had a directly political stamp. For example, the Soviet Union demanded that it be handed management of the mines and right to put in place a fifth of the employees. Locating this number of men in the Petsamo area, would have meant that the Soviet Union would in practice also have had a military support base in Petsamo.

Descriptive of the Soviet Union’s two-faced actions was that the nature of their demands in the matter of the Petsamo nickel mines were presented to us and to a certain interested superpower in totally different ways. To one party they stated as being only financially interested in relation to Petsamo nickel, to the other stating the matter as a totally politically act directed at Petsamo area.

Third doubtful demand related to transport of military equipment by railway via land area of Finland to the rented Hanko area. These points were not in the peace agreement. The inherent danger of these transports from point of view of the security of our country and the right to self determination is considerable. In this manner the Soviet Union attempted by various means weaken the political and military position of Finland.

Simultaneously with this, the Soviet Union attempted by all possible means by economical means to weaken our capacity to resist. Without the slightest foundation in the peace agreement, it demanded we surrender to them substantial amounts of railway equipments. Likewise, it demanded compensation for equipments removed or destroyed from the surrendered areas, extending these compensation demands likewise to property transferred from Hanko rental area, to which the Soviet Union could not possibly have had any right. Descriptive in respect of these demands were that, compensation was also demanded in respect of certain machinery that had been sold and removed from industrial establishments of Karelia several years prior to commencement of war. These had obviously at the time been catalogued by Russian spies, and with this as basis, demands were made for compensation.

Likewise, the Soviet Union laid claim to the valuable Vallinkoski, located in Vuoksa, which beyond doubt is in entirety located on Finland side of the border. Basis for this demand was that, the Finns had originally planned the construction of these rapids to be a part of the same power station at Ensonkoski, which had been left on the Russian side of the border.

In this manner the Soviet Union with continuous pressure and repeated threats strived to strengthen their position and expand their influence in Finland, and weaken our already otherwise difficult financial situation. In numerous cases we were forced to assent to demands of the Soviet Union. In other cases the negotiations were still in progress at commencement of the new war.

Being accustomed to keeping the given word people of Finland wanted to keep the agreement which we had been forced to make in Moscow. We silently agreed within our minds and said it numerous times in public, that we must conquer and redeem the losses attached to name of Karelia with domestic renewing and clearing works within our new borders.

With cold consideration we arrived at this result. Thoughts of revenge have neither surfaced nor led our actions. From Finland’s side we strived to forget suffered wrongs and humiliations, even if the Soviet Union’s against all internationally agreed rights and morals commenced attack’s wounds were stinging in the hearts of the entire nation.

Our starting point was that, as we live in this corner of the earth from generation to the next in close proximity as neighbors of Russia, relations with them must be accomplished. Once again, we wanted, regardless of the happened; commence building of permanent peace with the Soviet Union.

This wish of peace was tested time and time again, as can be concluded from the previously mentioned constant demands.

In order to show our wish for peace and in hope that by agreeing to demands, open conflict could have been avoided or at least delayed, and relations with Soviet Union in some way stabilized, we consented to much flexibility. However, our relation building was not limited only to passive willingness.

Also amongst us was kindled interest towards vivification of active relations. From our side we aimed for interaction in a wide variety of matters. In order to establish and maintain cultural relationships we even formed an association, Baltic Circle. From the side of Soviet Union, however, initiatives of this association were turned down, as were other aspirations originating from private sources. The Soviet Union took a like stand towards official attempts by our cabinet at establishing neighborly relations. The through proposals of a committee formed by Department of Education for the purpose of furthering Finland – Soviet Union cultural interaction did not result in any response from Soviet Union, not even agreeing to receive Finland’s Education Minister in order to negotiate developing of cultural relations. Likewise from our side we have regardless of all difficulties strived to form commercial relations.

Based on the above stated, the direction Soviet Union was aiming for in relation to us can be clearly observed. The independence of Finland had to be destroyed either by way of internal upheavals and difficulties, or eventually by being subdued by violent means. When the way by internal revolution appeared to be closed due to the enormous love of freedom and internal solidarity of our nation, the Soviet Union decided to resort to external violence.

To this end the Soviet Union’s Prime Minister and Commissar for Foreign Affairs, Mr. Molotov during the negotiations at Berlin during 12–13 November 1940, accordingly only 7 months following the Peace of Moscow demanded from Germany unconstrained right to resolve the matter with Finland and liquidate this country. We owe unreserved debt of gratitude to Germany’s Chancellor of State for his determination to dismiss these demands of Soviet Union.

Ever since commencement of the major war it has been possible to clearly observe what has been the Soviet Union’s aspirations and adopted attitude towards this war. The Soviet Union welcomed with delight the commencement of hostilities and has continuously endeavored to ensure the war would expand and continue as long as possible until the nations of Europe, and if at all possible, nations outside of Europe, would become both materially as well as morally weakened, their capacity to resist bolshevist enticement lessened and by these means would become easy prey for Soviet Union’s imperialistic aspirations when the Soviet Union would consider the opportune moment for it to become involved in the war by armed intervention. The Soviet Union has unscrupulously used various situations to its own advantage, and so also our country was drawn into, at time when superpowers were involved on other fronts, alone battle against the Soviet Union’s superior strength.

We do not hate the long suffering and ever under oppression lived people of Soviet Union, but in the aftermath of all that has taken place we could scarcely be expected to dress in mourning clothes, because Mr. Molotov together with those circles responsible for the Soviet Union’s politics now has become the victims of their own brand of politics.

As Soviet Union in connection of the battle between Germany and Soviet Union has expanded military operations to Finland area by attacking our peaceful nation, it is our duty to defend and we will perform that duty with determination and one-mindedly by all morally and militarily available means.

Our possibilities of successfully coping with this, our second defensive battle on this occasion are quite different than previously, when we by ourselves stood being squeezed by this eastern giant. The military forces of the great and powerful Germany, under command of the ingenious leader, Chancellor of State Hitler, will successfully side by side with us do battle against familiar to us Soviet Union’s military forces. Additionally, certain other nations have commenced military operations against Soviet Union, forming a continuous front stretching from North Atlantic to Black Sea. Under these circumstances the Soviet Union is not in position to place against our defence forces that crushingly superior force which on the previous occasion made our defensive battles so desperate. On this occasion the Soviet Union is involved in numerically equal battle, in which the success of our own defensive operations is guaranteed.

Our hardened defence forces enter battle for freedom of our fatherland, living space of our people, faith of our ancestors, and the free society system equally courageous and ready, but better armed and equipped than during the previous war. As all of them men and women who on either the front or in their various tasks in home regions, enthusiastically sacrifice their work and exertion for our defence, so also the entire internally united people at this important moment stimulate the spirit of arms and guide the resolution for implementation of even more justness within community.

Trust in our defence forces and their world-wide reputation achieved leader, Field-marshal Mannerheim, is absolute.

Citizens! Centuries have shown that at this location which fate has to our people given, permanent peace has not been able to be achieved. We have for ever been confronted with pressure from East. For alleviation of this pressure, for annihilation of eternal threat, for safeguarding happy and peaceful life of future generations we now take up arms. And on this occasion our chances of success are possibly greater than perhaps ever previously. Lord of the Destiny, in whose hands the lives of our people rest, lead us and bring our battle to ultimate victory.

The speech was later used against him at the War-responsibility trials. Afterwards Ryti stated he did not believe Germany would win as a whole but that its forces would defeat the Soviet Union.

Finnish troops soon regained the territory lost in the Winter War and a substantial buffer zone beyond. A considerable number of members of parliament were not excited by the idea of crossing the old borders, but obviously Ryti convinced Tanner and the Social Democrats to remain in the cabinet despite their opposition to the conquest of East Karelia. Ryti's ability to thus maintain a broad coalition government strongly contributed to morale and perceived national unity. In fact, from January 1941 to March 1943, even the far-right Patriotic People's Movement (IKL) participated in the government (see, for example, Martti Turtola, "Risto Ryti: A Life for the Fatherland", Sakari Virkkunen, "The Finnish Presidents II", and "The Republic's Presidents 1940-1956" / Tasavallan presidentit 1940-1956).

Ryti's mandate as president was intended to extend only through the rest of Kallio's term, i.e., to 1943, but as the government could not organize elections during the Continuation War, the electors from 1937 gathered to re-elect him. This exceptional procedure was mandated by a constitutional amendment passed by the Parliament of Finland. Ryti was elected by an overwhelming majority. Ryti was willing to continue as president because he was among those who led Finland into the war, even though during the winter of 1942, both Ryti and Mannerheim had their doubts about German victory.

=== Attempts at peace negotiations ===
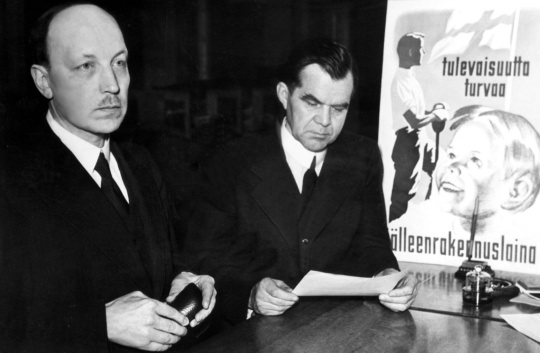
Ryti and Jukka Rangell in 1940s

Ryti wanted the government of Jukka Rangell to continue in office. However, the time had arrived for a "peace government", and it was formed after long negotiations by the chairman of the National Coalition Party, Professor Edwin Linkomies. He started preparations aimed at achieving peace with the Soviet Union in spring 1943. The Patriotic People's Movement was excluded from the government. The Soviet Union's major counter-offensive began on 9 June 1944, in a situation when Finland's relations with Germany were strained due to Finland's earlier attempts to secure a separate peace. There were speculations that a change of both government and president would ensue, but Marshal Mannerheim was unwilling to take the job of post-war prime minister even temporarily. Soon, Viipuri, the second biggest city of Finland, fell to the Red Army on 20 June.

The Finnish government tried to create a link for negotiations via Stockholm. The Soviet government replied that it was ready to negotiate, but only after an assurance that Finland would surrender unconditionally. The demand divided the Finnish government as Ryti and Tanner were in favour of replying, but Mannerheim and Linkomies opposed it. The situation was tense, as Finland was in dire need of food as well as weapons and ammunition.

=== Ryti–Ribbentrop Agreement ===
At the same time, the German foreign minister, Joachim von Ribbentrop, arrived in Finland on an unexpected visit lasting 22–27 June 1944. He called the Finnish government to commit itself to continue to fight against the Soviet Union. In return he promised military aid. Ryti had wanted parliament to decide on the matter. Mannerheim proposed the sending of a private letter. Finally, Ryti and Mannerheim compromised. The creation of a private letter from Ryti of the kind Mannerheim had envisioned was dealt with at a meeting of the Council of State. Ryti handed the letter to Ribbentrop on 26 June 1944; the compromise satisfied the Germans, who considered it to have secured the formal alliance they had long sought. Hitler replied on 4 July, promising all possible military assistance as well as economic support. An immediate consequence was that the United States broke diplomatic relations with Finland on 30 June 1944, without declaring war.

The military assistance that followed has long been credited in Finnish historiography with having been decisive in stopping the Soviet offensive. This picture has since been partly questioned: much of the modern anti-tank weaponry had already been delivered in early April 1944, almost two months before the Soviet offensive began, but remained in storage and troops had not yet been trained in its use. Likewise, the German Kuhlmey air detachment, which played an important role at the battle of Tali-Ihantala, had arrived in Finland on 16 June, before the agreement was concluded, and so was unconnected to it. The agreement's significance has instead been described as primarily psychological, while it did allow deliveries of weapons and grain to continue until relations with Germany were severed in early September 1944. Afterwards, the letter was named the Ryti–Ribbentrop Agreement.

By mid-July the front situation was stabilized. Ryti signed a letter of resignation in which, against his will, he referred among other things to health reasons. The letter was presented to the cabinet; and it went into effect 4 August 1944. The Finnish parliament appointed Mannerheim president in early August 1944. Mannerheim immediately declared to the Germans that he did not consider himself bound by the Ryti–Ribbentrop Agreement, which allowed peace negotiations with the Soviet Union to resume. The Soviet Union now required Finland to break relations with Germany and disarm or expel the German troops in the country by 15 September 1944; relations with Germany were severed on 2 September, and the armistice took effect two days later. Germany's refusal to withdraw its forces from northern Finland led to the Lapland War, fought between October 1944 and April 1945. Peace negotiations proceeded from a stronger position than earlier that summer, although most territorial gains had by then been lost.

== Last stages of career ==
=== War-guilt trials ===
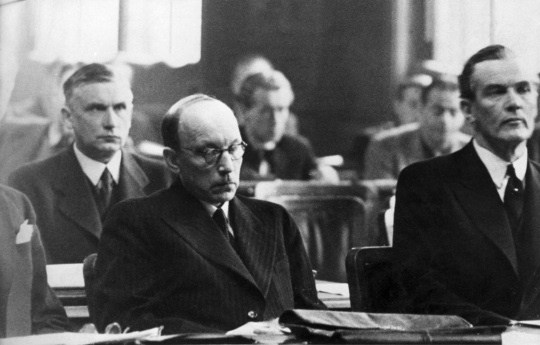
Risto Ryti during the war-responsibility trials in Finland, behind him, to the left, is former prime minister Edwin Linkomies and to the right, defender Hjalmar J. Procopé.

After Ryti resigned from the presidency, he was reappointed governor of the Bank of Finland. Jukka Rangell stepped aside to clear the way for Ryti. In autumn 1944, he used tough measures, as he had done during the Great Depression ten years earlier, in the nation's monetary policy. The policy was to fight inflation and boost exports. However, in spring 1945 Finnish communists and the Soviet Union demanded he be tried as "responsible for the war". His defence lawyer was the former foreign minister Hjalmar Procopé.

In 1946, Ryti was sentenced to 10 years imprisonment. Along with Ryti, seven other high officials were sentenced to prison, although for shorter terms. The group was convicted using an ex post facto law, which had been instituted for the purpose by the parliament. Although the Finnish constitution prohibited such legislation, the act in question was passed as a constitutional amendment, with a qualified majority in the parliament. Both the court and the parliament faced severe pressure from the Soviet Union and the United Kingdom during the process. Ryti's health failed during his sentence. Most of his stomach had to be removed due to a tumour; in addition, he developed arthritis during his first winter of imprisonment. By 1949, all the other convicts of the war-responsibility trials had been released on parole, while Ryti was hospitalized. He was pardoned by President Juho Kusti Paasikivi that year.

=== Final years ===
After being freed, Ryti never returned to public life. He concentrated on writing his memoirs but was not successful due to ill health. In 1952, he attended a university students' celebration where he accepted a badge of honour.

Although he refused to return to politics, Ryti voted regularly. In May 1956, just five months before his death, he received an honorary doctorate in political science from the Helsinki University.

Risto Ryti died in October 1956 and was buried with full presidential honors.

== Post-Soviet legacy ==
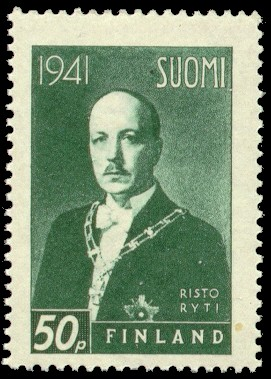
Postage stamp portraying Risto Ryti

After the Soviet Union collapsed, Ryti's reputation was publicly, but not officially, restored. The government's position on the propositions for the rehabilitation of Ryti and his fellow convicts has been that an official rehabilitation is unnecessary as the honour of the convicted has never been lost. The idea of annulling the sentences or the act retroactively has been considered to be unnecessary and contrary to Finnish judicial practice.

In 1994, a statue of Ryti was unveiled near the Parliament House. In 2004, in the YLE TV-series Suuret suomalaiset (Great Finns) Risto Ryti got the second highest number of votes.

The absence of any formal treaty between Finland and Germany during the Continuation War, other than Ryti's personal letter, has been cited in support of the "separate war" thesis (Finnish: erillissota; Swedish: separatkrig), the view that Finland fought its own war alongside, rather than as a proper ally of, Nazi Germany. The thesis has remained a subject of historiographical debate; it resurfaced in 2005 after the Finnish president invoked it in a speech, prompting a public protest from the Russian foreign ministry.

== Freemason and believer in Fate and spirituality ==
Risto Ryti was a Freemason, but after his prison sentence, was required to give up membership in his lodge, as convicts were barred from membership. He had become a Freemason in 1924, but according to the Finnish Grand Lodge's assistant grand scribe Reijo Ahtokari, he did not very actively participate in Masonic activities. In January 1941, he appointed a fellow Freemason, Johan Wilhelm "Jukka" Rangell, as prime minister only after his secretary Lauri Puntila suggested that he do so.

Ryti did, according to some of his friends and acquaintances, strongly believe in fate. After a dinner in the 1930s at the home of a friend, Alvar Renqvist, in Helsinki, Ryti told the other guests, according to Heikki A. Reenpää, Alvar Renqvist's grandson: "In my life, fate has been the ruling force. If it had not been benevolent, I would not sit here now."

One of Finland's most famous clairvoyants, Aino Kassinen, recalled in her memoirs that she met Ryti in the 1930s in Helsinki, and got the understanding that Ryti strongly believed in people's being guided by the higher divine powers, and that he strongly believed in God, and had studied theosophy and anthroposophy. Ryti's wife Gerda was a much more active spiritualist and theosophist than Ryti himself; she even claimed to have a spirit guide.

== In popular culture ==
Ryti was played by Pertti Sveholm in the 2001 television film Valtapeliä elokuussa 1940, directed by Veli-Matti Saikkonen.

== Cabinets ==
- Ryti I Cabinet
- Ryti II Cabinet

== Honours ==
=== Awards and decorations ===
- Finland : Grand Cross with Collar of the Order of the White Rose (Finland) (1940)
- Finland : Grand Cross with Collar of the Order of the White Rose (1936)
- Finland : Grand Cross of the Order of the Lion of Finland (1942)
- Finland : Grand Cross of the Order of the Cross of Liberty with Swords (1940)
- Independent State of Croatia : Grand order with Sash and Danica star of the Order of the Crown of King Zvonimir (1942)
- Nazi Germany : Order of the German Eagle in Gold with Star (Germany)
- United Kingdom : Knight Commander of the Royal Victorian Order
- Kingdom of Hungary : Grand Cross with Collar of the Order of Merit of the Kingdom of Hungary (18 February 1942)

== See also ==
- List of presidents of Finland

== Notes and references ==
=== Cited sources ===
- Turtola, Martti (1994). Risto Ryti: A Life for the Fatherland. Risto Ryti: Elämä isänmaan puolesta. Helsinki: Otava.
- Turtola, Martti (2000). "Risto Ryti". In Marjomaa, Ulpu (ed.). 100 faces from Finland. Finnish Literature Society. ISBN 951-746-215-8.
- Virkkunen, Sakari (1994). The Finnish Presidents II: Kallio - Ryti - Mannerheim / Suomen presidentit II: Kallio - Ryti - Mannerheim. Helsinki: Otava.

Political offices
| Preceded by Aimo Cajander | Prime Minister of Finland; 1939–1940 | Succeeded by Johan Wilhelm Rangell |
| Preceded by Kyösti Kallio | President of Finland; 1940–1944 | Succeeded by Carl Gustaf Emil Mannerheim |
