= Johan Wilhelm Rangell =

Prime minister of Finland from 1941 to 1943

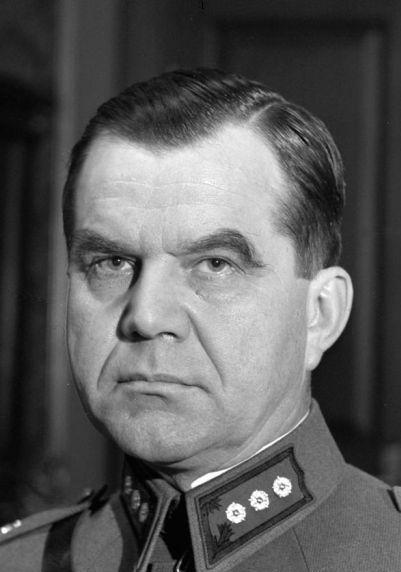
- Rangell in 1941

15th Prime Minister of Finland
- In office 4 January 1941 – 5 March 1943
- President: Risto Ryti
- Preceded by: Risto Ryti
- Succeeded by: Edwin Linkomies

Personal details
- Born: 25 October 1894 Hauho, Finland
- Died: 12 March 1982 (aged 87) Helsinki, Finland
- Party: National Progressive Party
- Education: University of Helsinki
- Profession: Lawyer

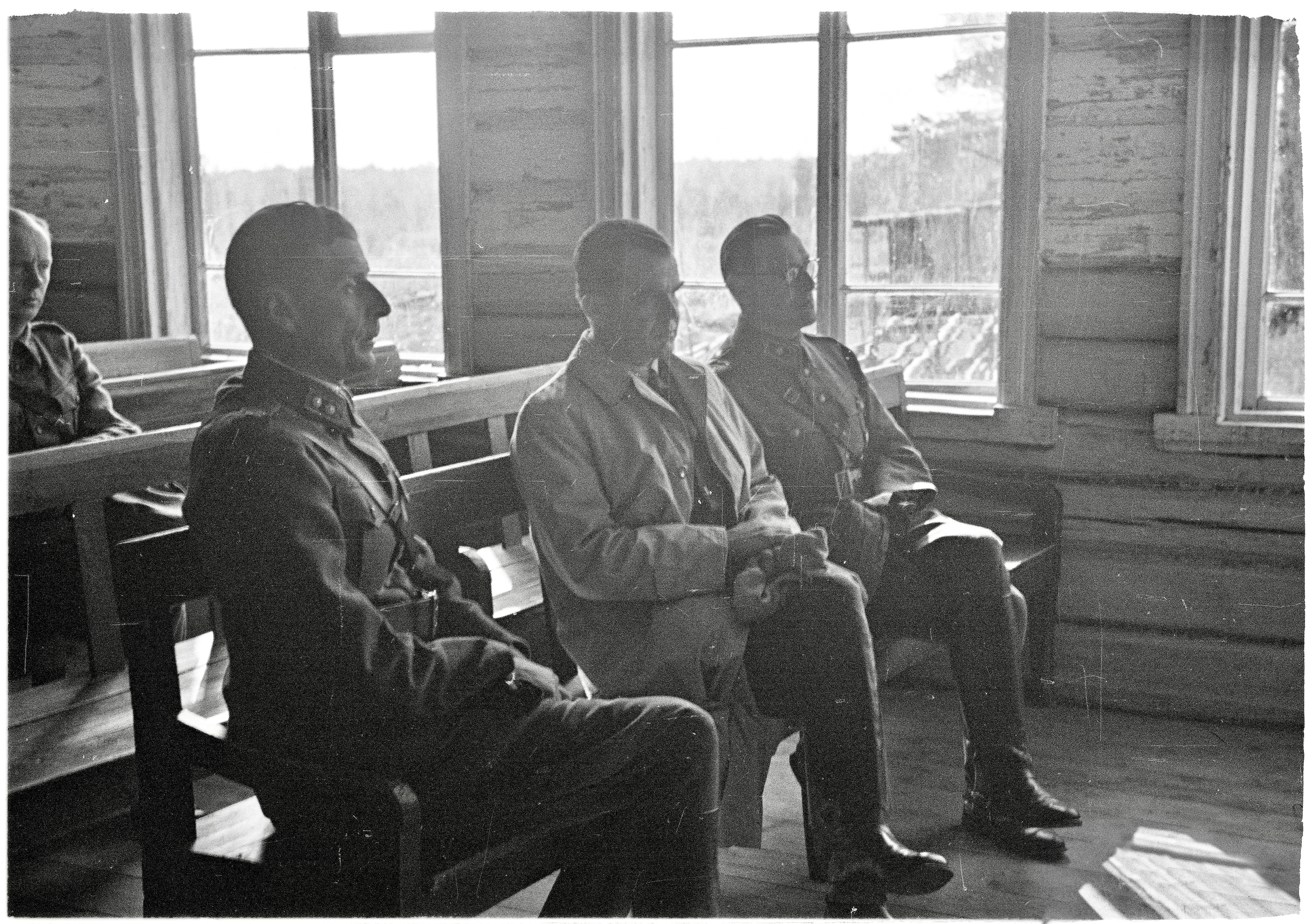
Prime minister Rangell, general Arajuuri and colonel Paloheimo in Eastern Karelian village in 15.7.1942

Johan Wilhelm (Jukka) Rangell (25 October 1894 – 12 March 1982) was the Prime Minister of Finland from 1941 to 1943.

Educated as a lawyer, he was a close acquaintance of President Risto Ryti before the war, and made his initial career as a banker in the Bank of Finland. He played a role in the efforts at a 1940 Summer Olympics in Helsinki after the International Olympic Committee (IOC) retracted the original choice of Tokyo. After the resignation of President Kyösti Kallio during the Interim Peace, Risto Ryti was elected by the Electoral College as the new president of Finland on December 19, 1940, and Rangell rose to the position of Prime Minister. In office, Rangell's expertise and influence dealt mainly with economic issues, while more important foreign policy power rested on Commander-in-Chief Mannerheim, President Ryti and Foreign Minister Witting. Due to his connections to the IOC following the Berlin Olympics, Rangell's political orientation was seen as pro-German.

Rangell's cabinet's belligerent actions in the Continuation War enjoyed the support of the Parliament. He defended the occupation of East Karelia and the regaining of the areas ceded in the Peace of Moscow. During Reichsführer-SS Heinrich Himmler's state visit to Finland in August 1942, Rangell silenced Himmler's questions concerning the Jewish minority of Finland by famously stating: "Wir haben keine Judenfrage" ("We do not have a Jewish question").

He served as the governor of the Bank of Finland from 1943 to 1944.

In the war-responsibility trials, Rangell was convicted for 6 years of prison in February 1946 for alleged crimes against peace. He was pardoned in 1949. After his release, Rangell did not return to politics, but continued to work for the Finnish Olympic Committee and the IOC until 1967. He also belonged to the board of Kansallis-Osake-Pankki bank.

== Cabinets ==
- Rangell Cabinet

Political offices
Preceded by Risto Ryti	Prime Minister of Finland; 1941–1943	Succeeded by Edwin Linkomies
Government offices
Preceded by Risto Ryti	Governor of the Bank of Finland; 1943-1944	Succeeded by Risto Ryti
