= Toivo Pohjala =

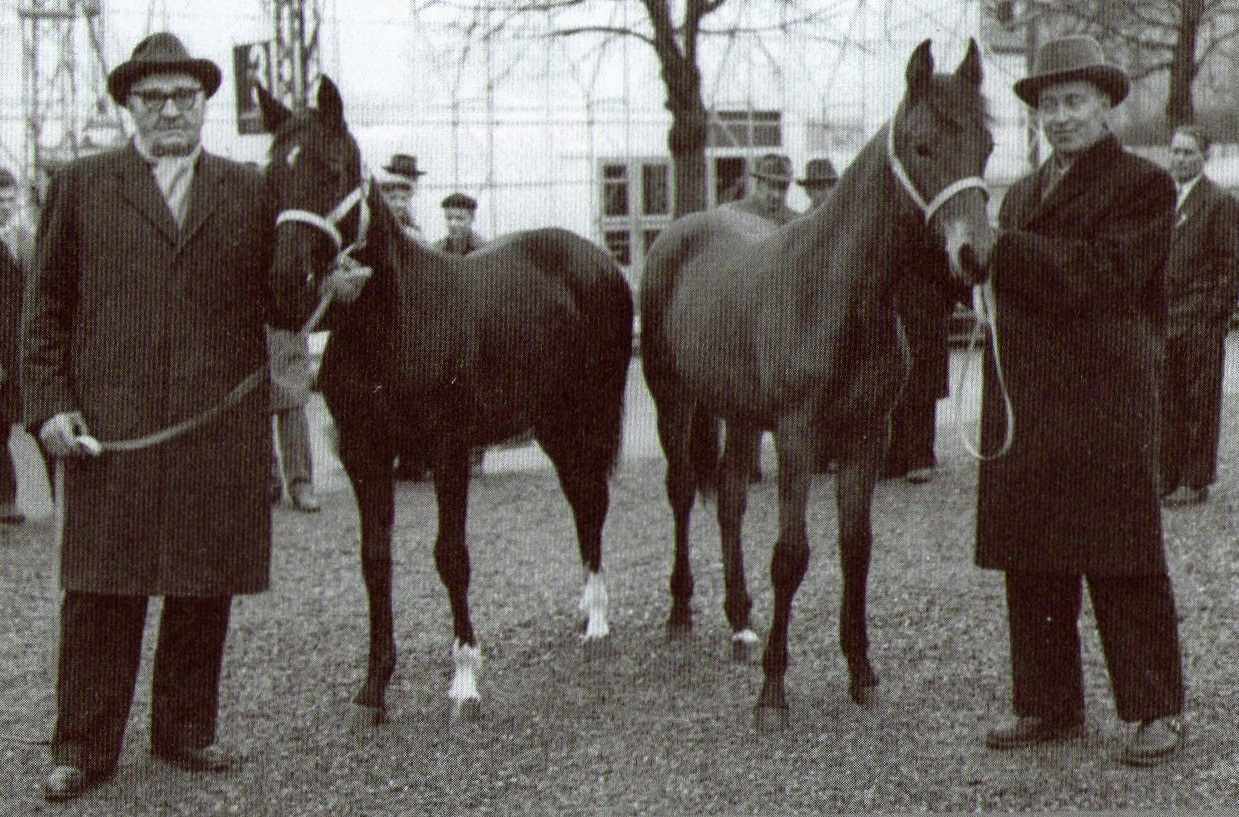
- Toivo Pohjala (left) and harness racing driver Tuomo Mäkelä with two Orlov mares
- Born: 1 February 1888; Nakkila, Finland
- Died: 23 August 1969 (aged 81); Helsinki, Finland

Toivo Pohjala (1 February 1888 – 23 August 1969) was a Finnish wrestler and harness racing driver.

== Wrestling ==
Pohjala competed at the 1924 Summer Olympics, where he placed 7th in freestyle heavyweight event. He won a bronze medal in the heavyweight class at the 1922 World Wrestling Championships.

== Harness racing ==
As a harness racer Pohjala won two Racing King titles with his Finnhorse stallion "Lohdutus" in 1938 Vyborg and 1939 Turku. He was also the president of Finnish Trotting Association from 1955 to 1962.

== Family ==
His son Toivo T. Pohjala (1931–2018) was a former member of Finnish Parliament who served as the Minister of Agriculture and Forestry in 1987–1991.
