= Toivo Topias Pohjala =

Finnish agronomist and politician (1931–2018)

- Born: July 27, 1931; Harjavalta, Finland
- Died: November 12, 2018 (aged 87); Harjavalta, Finland
- Occupations: agronomist and politician
- Political party: National Coalition Party
- Spouse: Sinikka Linkomies-Pohjala
- Parent: Toivo Pohjala

Toivo Topias Pohjala (July 27, 1931 – November 12, 2018) was a Finnish agronomist and politician. He was born in Harjavalta, and is son of Toivo Pohjala. He was a member of the Parliament of Finland from 1975 to 1987. From 1987 to 1991 he served as Minister of Agriculture and Forestry.
