= Waldemar Erfurth =

German general of infantry, writer, and liaison officer to Finland

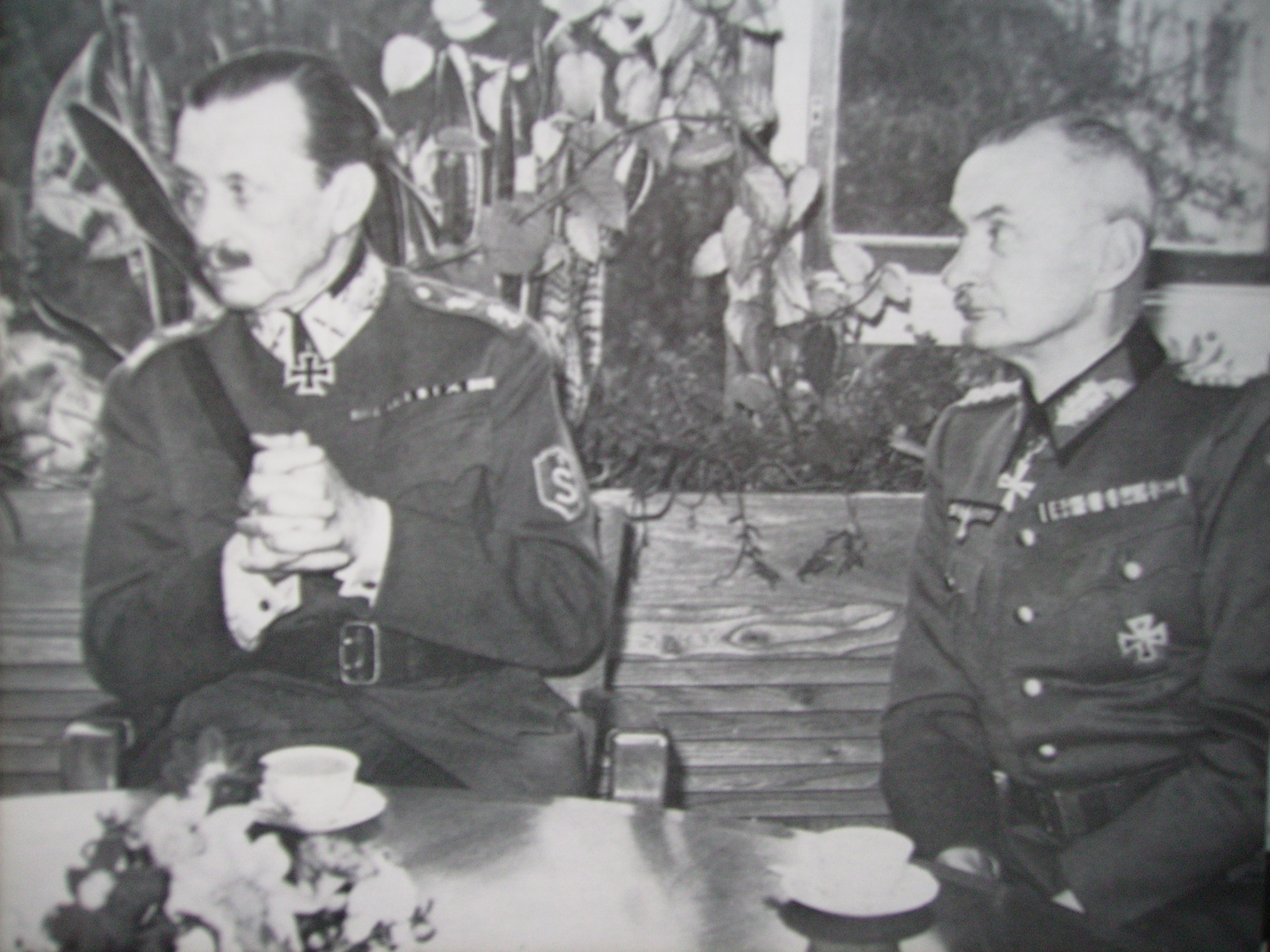
- Erfurth with C. G. E. Mannerheim.
- Born: 4 August 1879; Berlin, German Empire
- Died: 2 May 1971 (aged 91); Tübingen, West Germany
- Military career
- Allegiance: German Empire; Weimar Republic; Nazi Germany
- Branch: Heer (Wehrmacht)
- Rank: General der Infanterie
- Conflicts: World War I World War II; Continuation War
- Awards: Iron Cross of 1914, 1st class Knight's Cross of the Royal House Order of Hohenzollern with Swords; Finnish Order of the Cross of Liberty, First Class with Breast Star and Swords
- Other work: Writer

Waldemar Erfurth (4 August 1879 – 2 May 1971) was a German general of infantry, a writer and liaison officer to Finland during World War II.

Erfurth was born in Berlin. He served in World War I, receiving the Iron Cross 1st Class and the Knight's Cross of the Royal House Order of Hohenzollern. After the war, he continued in the Reichswehr of the Weimar Republic. As German–Finnish military relations intensified in early 1941, Erfurth was posted as liaison officer at the Finnish headquarters in St. Michel, where he served from 1941 to 1944. His principal Finnish counterpart was the chief of the general staff, Erik Heinrichs. After the war he published extensively on military history, including works on the Murmansk Railway and his time at the Finnish headquarters. He died in Tübingen.

== Awards and decorations ==
- German Empire:
  - Kingdom of Prussia:
    - Iron Cross of 1914, 1st and 2nd Class
    - Royal House Order of Hohenzollern, Knight's Cross with Swords (7 November 1916)
    - Officer's Service Decoration Cross
  - Kingdom of Bavaria: Military Merit Order, 3rd Class with Swords
  - Kingdom of Saxony: Albert Order, Knight's Cross 1st Class with Swords
  - Grand Duchy of Mecklenburg-Schwerin: Military Merit Cross, 2nd Class
  - Duchy of Brunswick: War Merit Cross, 2nd Class
  - (Free City of Lübeck) Free and Hanseatic City of Lübeck: Hanseatic Cross
- Nazi Germany:
  - Wehrmacht Long Service Award, 4th to 1st Class (2 October 1936)
  - War Merit Cross 2nd Class with Swords (30 January 1941)
  - War Merit Cross 1st Class with Swords (25 October 1941)
  - German Cross in Silver (20 April 1943)
  - Knight's Cross of the War Merit Cross with Swords (8 November 1944)
- (Austria) (Hungary) Austro-Hungarian Empire:
  - Order of the Iron Crown, 3rd Class with War Decoration
  - Austrian Military Merit Cross, 3rd Class with War Decoration
- (Tsardom of Bulgaria (1908–1946)) Kingdom of Bulgaria: Order of Bravery, 4th Class, 1st Grade
- Republic of Finland:
  - Order of the Cross of Liberty, First Class with Breast Star and Swords (16 September 1941)
  - Medal of Merit in gold of the Order of the Cross of Liberty (13th June 1944)
- Ottoman Empire: War Medal (Harp Madalyası or "Iron Crescent")

== Bibliography ==
- Der finnische Krieg (1950)
- Muurmannin radan ongelma (1952)
- Sotapäiväkirja marraskuu 1943 – syyskuu 1944 (1954; Swedish translation: Krigsdagbok november 1943 – september 1944, Söderströms, 1954)
- Die Geschichte des deutschen Generalstabs von 1918 bis 1945 (1957)
