= Tulenheimo cabinet =

Tulenheimo Cabinet
- 12th Cabinet of Finland
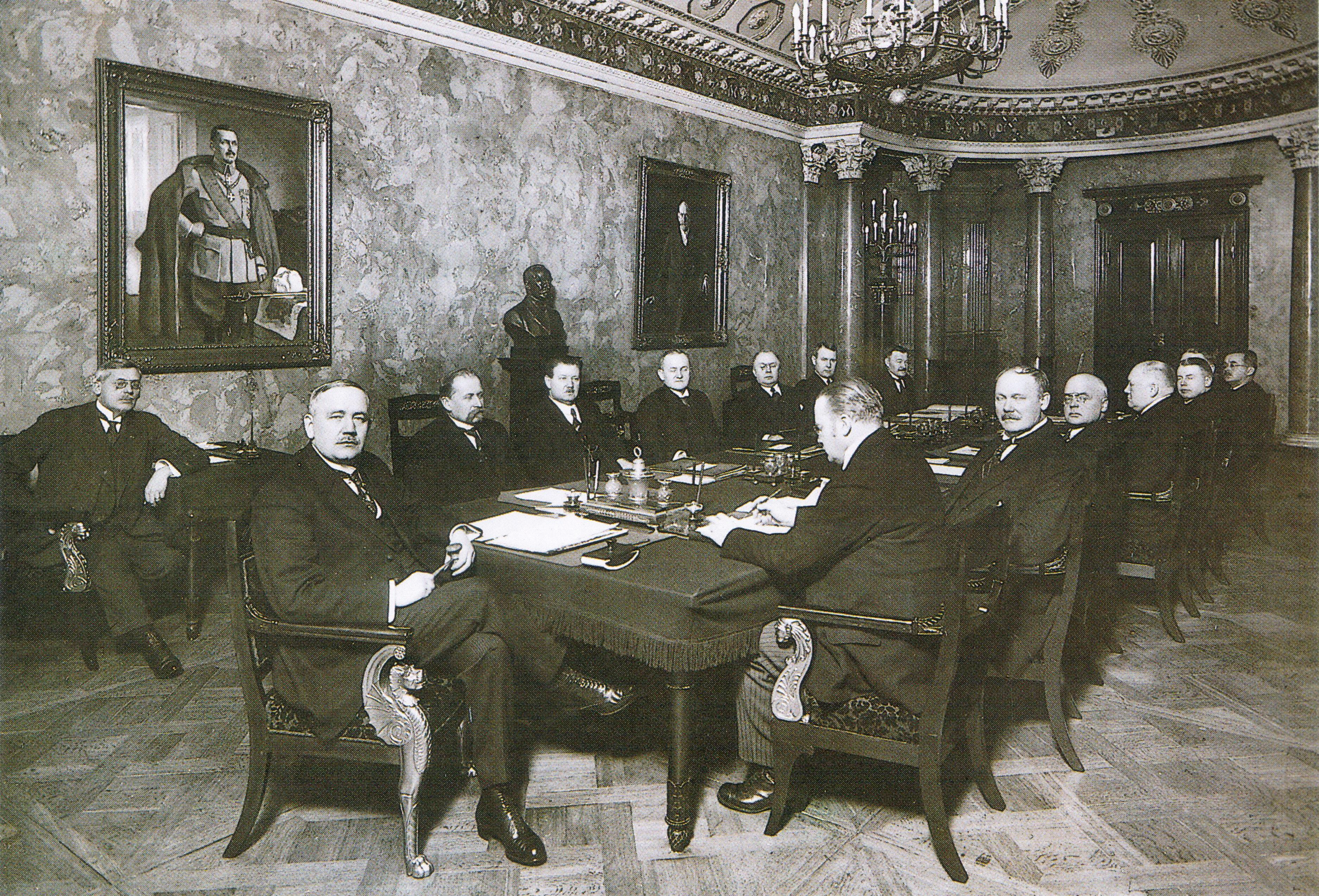
- The Tulenheimo government at its last session in December 1925
- Date formed: 31 March 1925
- Date dissolved: 31 December 1925

People and organisations
- Prime Minister: Antti Tulenheimo
- Total no. of members: 13
- Member parties: Agrarian League; National Coalition

History
- Predecessor: Ingman II
- Successor: Kallio II

Antti Tulenheimo's cabinet was the Government of Finland from March 31, 1925 to December 31, 1925. It was formed between the National Coalition Party and the Agrarian Party, and had four ministers from the National Coalition Party, five from the Agrarian Party and four neutral. The cabinet lasted 276 days in office. The cabinet resigned after its proposal for defense spending was defeated in the parliament.

Assembly
Minister	Period of office	Party
Prime Minister; Antti Tulenheimo	March 31, 1925 – December 31, 1925	National Coalition Party
Minister for Foreign Affairs; Gustaf Idman	March 31, 1925 – December 31, 1925	Independent
Minister of Justice; Frans Oskar Lilius	March 31, 1925 – December 31, 1925	Independent
Minister of Defence; Aleksander Lampén	March 31, 1925 – December 31, 1925	National Coalition Party
Minister of the Interior; Matti Aura	March 31, 1925 – December 31, 1925	Independent
Minister of Finance; Hugo Relander	March 31, 1925 – December 31, 1925	Independent
Minister of Education; Emil Nestor Setälä	March 31, 1925 – December 31, 1925	National Coalition Party
Minister of Agriculture; Juho Sunila	March 31, 1925 – December 31, 1925	Agrarian League
Deputy Minister of Agriculture; Vihtori Vesterinen	March 31, 1925 – December 31, 1925	Agrarian League
Minister of Transport and Public Works; Kyösti Kallio	March 31, 1925 – December 31, 1925	Agrarian League
Minister of Trade and Industry; Yrjö Pulkkinen	March 31, 1925 – December 31, 1925	National Coalition Party
Minister of Social Affairs; Vilkku Joukahainen	March 31, 1925 – December 31, 1925	Agrarian League
Minister without Portfolio; Kalle Lohi	March 31, 1925 – December 31, 1925	Agrarian League

Preceded by Ingman II	Government of Finland; March 31, 1925 – December 31, 1925	Succeeded by Kallio II
