= Minister of the Interior (Finland) =

Finnish cabinet position

- Suomen sisäministeri
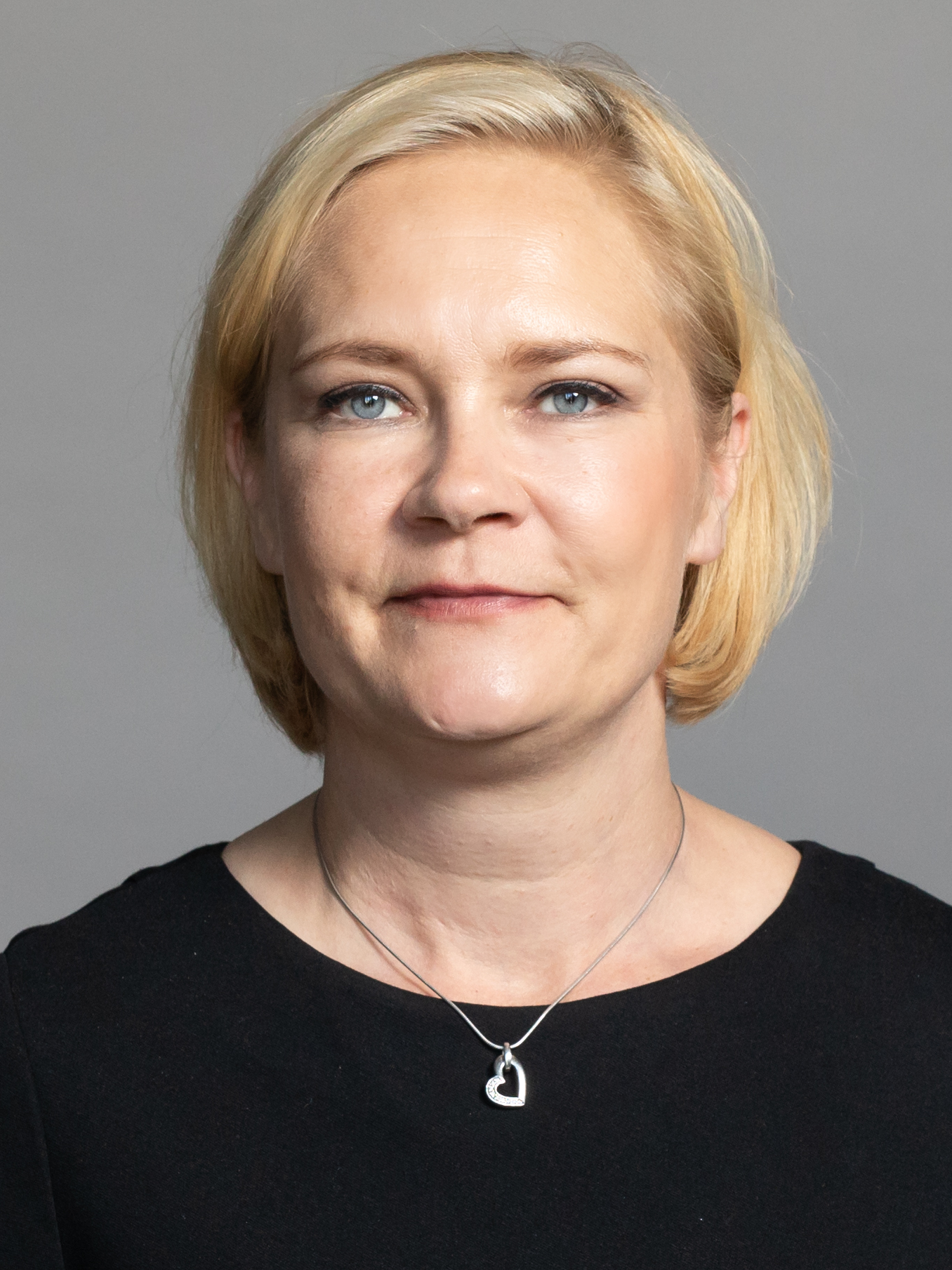
- Incumbent; Mari Rantanen since 20 June 2023
- Appointer: President of Finland
- Formation: 27 November 1917; 108 years ago
- First holder: Arthur Castrén

The minister of the interior (Finnish: sisäministeri, before 2013 sisäasiainministeri, Swedish: inrikesminister) is one of the ministerial portfolios in the Finnish Government. The minister of the interior is in charge of the Ministry of the Interior.

The incumbent Orpo Cabinet's minister of the interior is Mari Rantanen of the Finns Party.

== List of ministers of the interior ==
Minister	Party	In office
Arthur Castrén	Young Finnish Party	27.11.1917 – 27.11.1918
Antti Tulenheimo	National Coalition Party	27.11.1918 – 17.4.1919
Carl Voss-Schrader	Swedish People's Party	17.4.1919 – 15.8.1919
Heikki Ritavuori	National Progressive Party	15.8.1919 – 15.3.1920
Albert von Hellens	National Progressive Party	15.3.1920 – 9.4.1921
Heikki Ritavuori	National Progressive Party	9.4.1921–14.2.1922 †
Heimo Helminen	National Progressive Party	24.2.1922–2.6.1922
Yrjö Johannes Eskelä	Independent politician	2.6.1922 – 14.11.1922
Vilkku Joukahainen	Agrarian League	14.11.1922 – 18.1.1924
Yrjö Johannes Eskelä	Independent politician	18.1.1924 – 31.5.1924
Gunnar Sahlstein	National Coalition Party	31.5.1924 – 31.3.1925
Matti Aura	Independent politician	31.3.1925 – 31.12.1925
Gustaf Ignatius	National Coalition Party	31.12.1925 – 13.12.1926
Rieti Itkonen	Social Democratic Party	13.12.1926 – 12.4.1927
Olavi Heikki Puro	Social Democratic Party	29.4.1927 – 17.12.1927
Matti Aura	Independent politician	17.12.1927 – 22.12.1928
Toivo Kivimäki	National Progressive Party	22.12.1928 – 16.8.1929
Arvo Linturi	Independent politician	16.8.1929 – 4.7.1930
Erkki Kuokkanen	National Coalition Party	4.7.1930 – 21.3.1931
Ernst von Born	Swedish People's Party	21.3.1931 – 14.12.1932
Yrjö Puhakka	Independent politician	14.12.1932 – 12.3.1937
Urho Kekkonen	Agrarian League	12.3.1937 – 1.12.1939
Ernst von Born	Swedish People's Party	1.12.1939 – 13.5.1941
Toivo Horelli	National Coalition Party	13.5.1941 – 5.3.1943
Leo Ehrnrooth	Swedish People's Party	5.3.1943 – 8.8.1944
Kaarlo Hillilä	Agrarian League	8.8.1944 – 17.4.1945
Yrjö Leino	Finnish People's Democratic League	26.3.1946 – 22.5.1948
Eino Kilpi	Finnish People's Democratic League	26.5.1948 – 29.7.1948
Aarre Simonen	Social Democratic Party	29.7.1948 – 17.3.195
Urho Kekkonen	Agrarian League	17.3.1950 – 17.1.1951
V. J. Sukselainen	Agrarian League	17.1.1951 – 17.3.1953
Heikki Kannisto	Finnish People's Party	17.3.1953 – 5.5.1954
Väinö Leskinen	Social Democratic Party	5.5.1954 – 30.9.1955
Valto Käkelä	Social Democratic Party	30.9.1955 – 3.3.1956
Vilho Väyrynen	Social Democratic Party	3.3.1956 – 27.5.1957
Harras Kyttä	Finnish People's Party	27.5.1957 – 2.9.1957
Teuvo Aura	Independent politician	2.9.1957 – 29.11.1957
Urho Kiukas	Independent politician	29.11.1957 – 26.4.1958
Harras Kyttä	Finnish People's Party	26.4.1958 – 29.8.1958
Atte Pakkanen	Agrarian League	29.8.1958 – 13.1.1959
Eino Palovesi	Agrarian League	13.1.1959 – 4.2.1960
Eemil Luukka	Agrarian League	4.2.1960 – 13.4.1962
Eeli Erkkilä	Agrarian League	13.4.1962 – 8.2.1963
Niilo Ryhtä	Agrarian League	8.2.1963 – 18.12.1963
Arno Hannus	Independent politician	18.12.1963 – 12.9.1964
Niilo Ryhtä	Centre Party	12.9.1964 – 27.5.1966
Martti Viitanen	Social Democratic Party	27.5.1966 – 30.11.1967
Antero Väyrynen	Social Democratic Party	1.12.1967 – 14.5.1970
Teemu Hiltunen	Independent politician	14.5.1970 – 15.7.1970
Artturi Jämsén	Centre Party	15.7.1970 – 28.5.1971
Eino Uusitalo	Centre Party	28.5.1971 – 29.10.1971
Heikki Tuominen	Independent politician	29.10.1971 – 23.2.1972
Martti Viitanen	Social Democratic Party	23.2.1972 – 4.9.1972
Heikki Tuominen	Independent politician	4.9.1972 – 13.6.1975
Heikki Koski	Independent politician	13.6.1975 – 30.11.1975
Paavo Tiilikainen	Social Democratic Party	30.11.1975 – 29.9.1976
Eino Uusitalo	Centre Party	29.9.1976 – 19.2.1982
Matti Ahde	Social Democratic Party	19.2.1982 – 30.9.1983
Matti Luttinen	Social Democratic Party	1.10.1983 – 30.11.1984
Kaisa Raatikainen	Social Democratic Party	1.12.1984 – 30.4.1987
Jarmo Rantanen	Social Democratic Party	30.4.1987 – 26.4.1991
Mauri Pekkarinen	Centre Party	26.4.1991 – 13.4.1995
Jan-Erik Enestam	Swedish People's Party	13.4.1995 – 15.4.1999
Kari Häkämies	National Coalition Party	15.4.1999 – 1.9.2000
Ville Itälä	National Coalition Party	1.9.2000 – 17.4.2003
Kari Rajamäki	Social Democratic Party	17.4.2003 – 19.4.2007
Anne Holmlund	National Coalition Party	19.4.2007 – 22.6.2011
Päivi Räsänen	Christian Democrats	22.6.2011 – 29.5.2015
Petteri Orpo	National Coalition Party	29.5.2015 – 22.6.2016
Paula Risikko	National Coalition Party	22.6.2016 – 5.2.2018
Kai Mykkänen	National Coalition Party	6.2.2018 – 6.6.2019
Maria Ohisalo	Green League	6.6.2019 – 19.11.2021
Krista Mikkonen	Green League	19.11.2021 – 20.6.2023
Mari Rantanen	Finns Party	20.6.2023 –
