= Kallio II cabinet =

13th government of Finland

Kallio II Cabinet
- 13th Cabinet of Finland
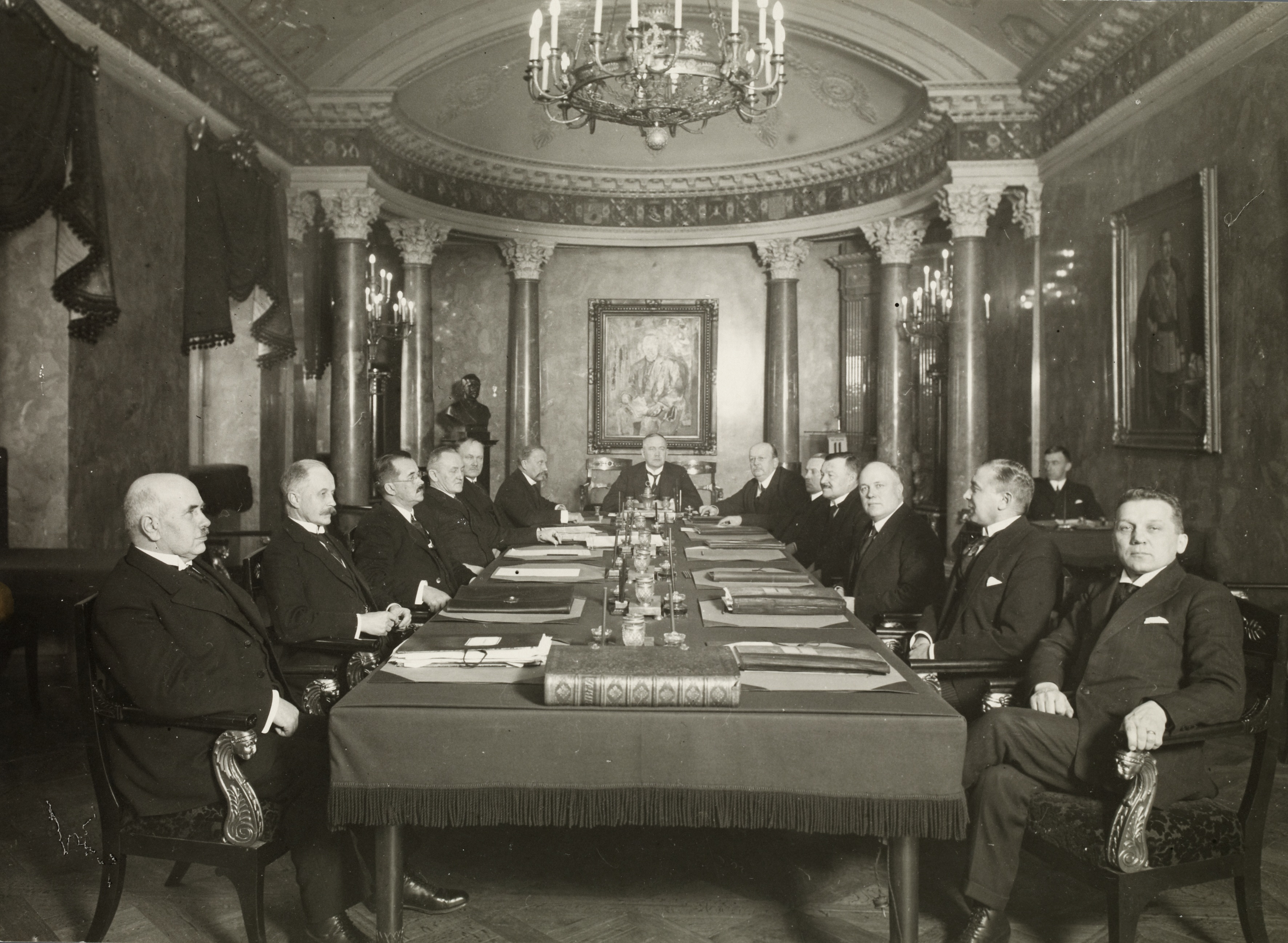
- Kallio's second cabinet, with President L. K. Relander at the head of the table.
- Date formed: 31 December 1925
- Date dissolved: 13 December 1926

People and organisations
- Prime Minister: Kyösti Kallio
- Total no. of members: 12
- Member parties: Agrarian League; National Coalition

History
- Predecessor: Tulenheimo
- Successor: Tanner

Kyösti Kallio's second cabinet was the 13th government of Finland from December 31, 1925 to December 13, 1926. It was formed between Agrarian Party and National Coalition Party, and had six ministers from each party. The cabinet lasted 348 days in office.

Assembly
Minister	Period of office	Party
Prime Minister; Kyösti Kallio	December 31, 1925 – December 13, 1926	Agrarian League
Minister for Foreign Affairs; Emil Nestor Setälä	December 31, 1925 – December 13, 1926	National Coalition Party
Minister of Justice; Urho Castrén	December 31, 1925 – December 13, 1926	National Coalition Party
Minister of Defence; Leonard Hjelmman	December 31, 1925 – December 13, 1926	National Coalition Party
Minister of the Interior; Gustaf Ignatius	December 31, 1925 – December 13, 1926	National Coalition Party
Minister of Finance; Kyösti Järvinen	December 31, 1925 – December 13, 1926	National Coalition Party
Minister of Education; Lauri Ingman	December 31, 1925 – December 13, 1926	National Coalition Party
Minister of Agriculture; Juho Sunila	December 31, 1925 – December 13, 1926	Agrarian League
Deputy Minister of Agriculture; Vihtori Vesterinen	December 31, 1925 – December 13, 1926	Agrarian League
Minister of Transport and Public Works; Juho Niukkanen	December 31, 1925 – December 13, 1926	Agrarian League
Minister of Trade and Industry; Tyko Reinikka	December 31, 1925 – December 13, 1926	Agrarian League
Minister of Social Affairs; Kalle Lohi	December 31, 1925 – December 13, 1926	Agrarian League

Preceded by Tulenheimo	Government of Finland; December 31, 1925 – December 13, 1926	Succeeded by Tanner
