= Hjalmar J. Procopé =

Finnish politician and diplomat (1889–1954)

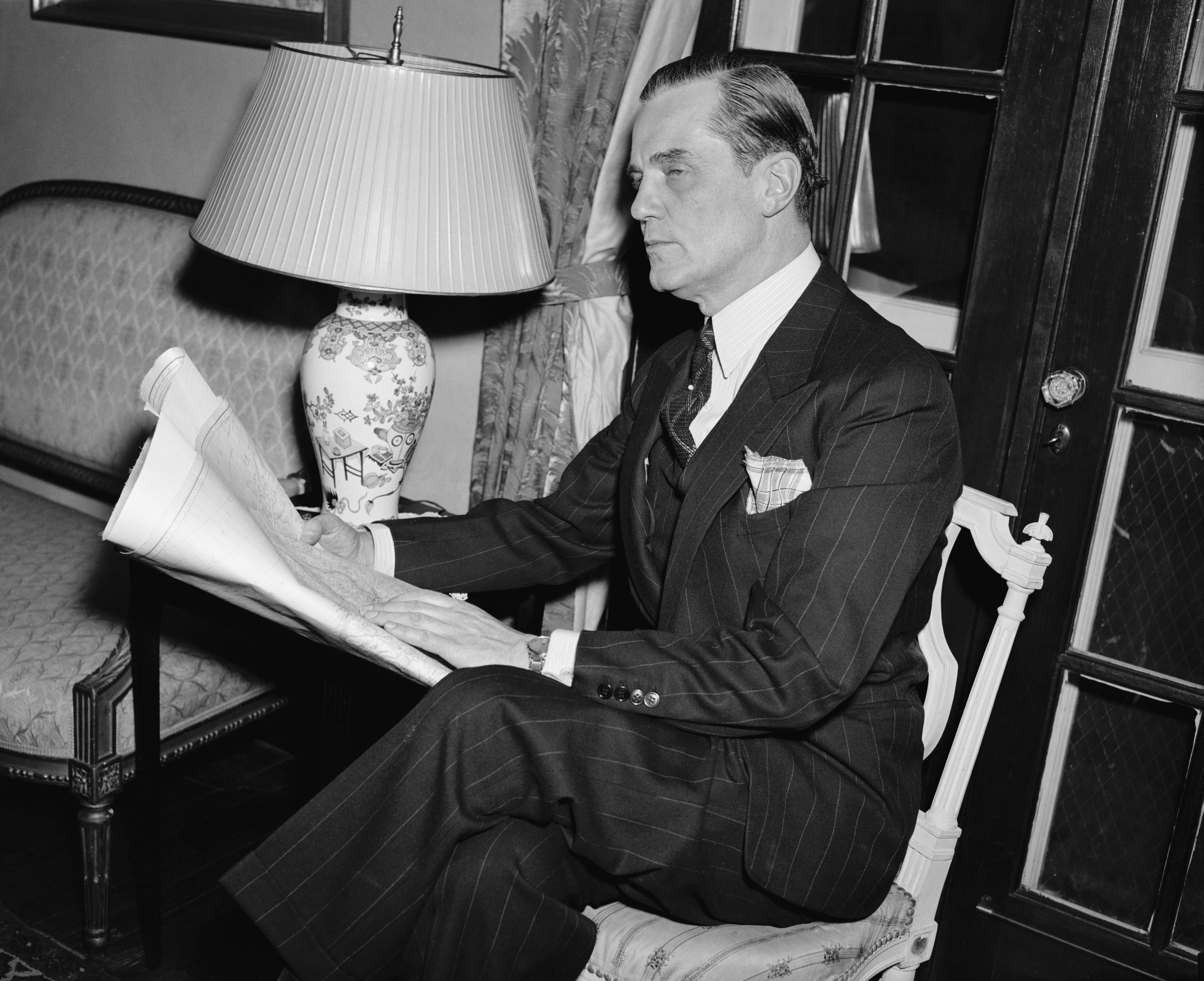

Minister of Foreign Affairs
- In office 31 May 1924 – 31 March 1925
- Prime Minister: Lauri Ingman
- Preceded by: Carl Enckell
- Succeeded by: Gustaf Idman
- In office 17 December 1927 – 21 March 1931
- Prime Minister: Juho Sunila; Oskari Mantere; Kyösti Kallio; Pehr Evind Svinhufvud
- Preceded by: Väinö Voionmaa
- Succeeded by: Aarno Yrjö-Koskinen

Personal details
- Born: Hjalmar Fredrik Johan Procopé; 8 August 1889 Stockholm, Sweden
- Died: 8 March 1954 (aged 64) Helsinki, Finland
- Party: Swedish People's Party of Finland
- Spouses: Mary Ek (m. 1916–1926) Anna Margaretha Norrmén (m. 1927–1939) Margaret Katherine Mary Shaw (m. 1940–1949) Brita Leila von Heidenstam (m. 1949–1954)
- Children: 1 (Victor Procopé)
- Occupation: Lawyer

Hjalmar Johan Fredrik Procopé (8 August 1889 – 8 March 1954) was a Finnish politician and a diplomat from the Swedish People's Party. Procopé was a minister in several cabinets in the 1920s and 1930s.

Hjalmar Procopé was born on 8 August 1889 to Major General Carl Albert Fredrik Procopé and Elin Hedvig Vendla von Törne. After matriculating in 1907, Procopé studied law at Helsinki University (then the Imperial University of Finland). He graduated in 1914 and received the title of varatuomari (Master of Laws trained on the bench) in 1916. Between 1915 and 1922 Procopé worked as an attorney in Helsinki. He worked in the Finnish embassy in Berlin from spring 1918 to his resignation in the end of the same year. Procopé was a Member of the Finnish Parliament (Eduskunta) from 1919 to 1922 and 1924 to 1926. His political party was the Swedish People’s Party.

Hjalmar Procopé served as minister on several occasions:

- Minister of Trade and Industry 1920-1921 in Erich’s Cabinet
- Minister of Trade and Industry 1924 in Cajander’s second Cabinet
- Minister of Foreign Affairs 1924-1925 in Ingman’s second Cabinet
- Minister of Foreign Affairs 1927-1931 in Cabinets Sunila I, Mantere, Kallio III and Svinhufvud II

In between of his two first terms as Minister of Foreign Affairs, Procopé served as Envoy of Finland in Warsaw 1926–1927. After his career as minister he worked as CEO of Finnish Paper Mills’ Association (Suomen Paperitehtaiden Yhdistys) from 1931 to 1939. Procopé was awarded the special title of Minister (ministeri) in 1931.

Hjalmar Procopé served as Envoy of Finland in Washington D.C. during the war years 1939–1944. According to Finnish National Archive researcher Kauko Rumpunen, Franklin Roosevelt warned Procopé about the Molotov–Ribbentrop Pact and its contents on 28 August 1939. Prior to this Procopé had received information about the pact from other sources and he informed Finland with a telegram on 23 August 1939, the day the pact was signed. Roosevelt’s warning officially arrived in Finland a month after the meeting between Roosevelt and Procopé as part of a routine report. This report was not taken entirely seriously by the government of Finland, partly because Roosevelt never revealed the original source of the tip, a subordinate of Joachim von Ribbentrop.

During the Winter War (30 November 1939 – 13 March 1940) Procopé used the sympathy of Americans to benefit the interests of Finland. The political situation changed in late summer 1944 when Finland and Nazi Germany became enemies. Hjalmar Procopé was put into awaiting posting and he resigned from the service of the Foreign Ministry in November 1945.

Procopé was the defense counsel of President Risto Ryti during the War-responsibility trials 1945–1946 and at the same time the defense leader of all defendants of the trials. During his last years Procopé participated in anti-communist activities in Finland, and later resided in exile in Stockholm and New York. Procopé died in Helsinki while visiting Finland in order to vote in the 1954 Finnish parliamentary election.

One of Procopé's cousins was the journalist and poet Hjalmar F. E. Procopé (1868–1927). Procopé’s son Victor Procopé (1918–1998) was a Member of the Finnish Parliament. He had two sons with his third wife Margaret Shaw, John Procopé and Frederick Procopé.

Political offices
| Preceded by Carl Enckell | Foreign Minister of Finland; 1924–1925 | Succeeded by Gustaf Idman |
| Preceded by Väinö Voionmaa | Foreign Minister of Finland; 1927–1931 | Succeeded by Aarno Yrjö-Koskinen |
