= Sunila =

Sunila may refer to:

== Given name ==
- Sunila Abeysekera (1952–2013), Sri Lankan human rights campaigner
- Sunila Apte, Indian badminton player
- Sunila Devi (1963–2017), Indian social activist and political worker

== Surname ==
- Juho Sunila (1875–1936), Finnish politician
  - Sunila I Cabinet
  - Sunila II Cabinet

== Other uses ==
- Sunila, Kotka, a human settlement in Finland
- Silent Sunila, a 2015 Indian Kannada-language film

== See also ==
- Sunil, an Indian name
- Sunil (actor), Indian actor
- Sunil (director), Indian film director in Malayalam cinema
- Sunil (Kannada actor), Indian film actor
