= Aleksander Lampén =

Finnish engineer and politician (1879–1935)

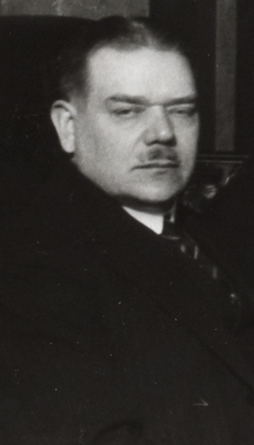

Minister of Defence
- In office March 1925 – 31 December 1925
- Prime Minister: Antti Tulenheimo

Personal details
- Born: 20 July 1879 Belozersk Russia
- Died: 25 July 1935 (aged 56) Vyborg Finland
- Party: National Coalition Party
- Occupation: Engineer

Aleksander Lampén (20 July 1879 Belozersk, Russia – 25 July 1935 Vyborg, Finland) was a Finnish engineer, politician, mountain councilor and businessperson. He was one of the pioneers in the wood processing industry. He served as the minister of defence between March 1925 and December 1925.

== Early life and education ==
Lampén was born in Belozersk, Russia 1879. He graduated from the high school in Helsinki in 1899. He obtained a degree in engineering from the Mechanical and Chemical Department of the Finnish Polytechnic Institute in 1903. He continued his studies at Columbia University between 1904 and 1906 and at the Technische Hochschule in Charlottenburg (now Technische Universität Berlin) between 1906 and 1907.

== Career and activities ==
Lampén had business activities and headed the Tornator Oy company. He was the technical director of the company from 1908 to 1918 and then its managing director from 1918 to 1932. He established the Association of Finnish Paper Engineers along with Ilmari Stenbäck on 12 April 1914.

Lampén headed the field artillery of the Ministry of Defence from 1924 to 1925. He was a member of the National Coalition Party and served as the minister of defence between 31 March 1925 and 31 December 1925 in the cabinet led by Antti Tulenheimo. He was made the Vuorineuvos or mountain councillor in 1929. He became the industrial advisor of the Kansallis-Osake-Pankki in 1932 and the chair of the Suomen Puunvienti Oy in 1933.

== Personal life and death ==
Lampén married Lucie Agnes Antonie Kottke (1883–1962) in 1909. From 1932 they resided in Punkaharju. The Aleksander and Lucie Lampén fund annually awards study scholarships to Finnish students of the School of Chemical Engineering at Aalto University.

Lampén died in Vyborg 1935.

=== Awards ===
Lampén was the recipient of the Order of the Cross of Liberty, the Order of the White Rose of Finland, the Order of the Polar Star and French Officier de l'Instruction publique.
