= Mantere cabinet =

Government of Finland from 1928 to 1929

Mantere Cabinet
- 16th Cabinet of Finland
- Date formed: 22 December 1928
- Date dissolved: 16 August 1929

People and organisations
- Prime Minister: Oskari Mantere
- Total no. of members: 12
- Member party: National Progressive

History
- Predecessor: Sunila I
- Successor: Kallio III

Oskari Mantere's cabinet was the 16th government of Republic of Finland. Cabinet's time period was from December 22, 1928 to August 16, 1929. It was a minority government.

Assembly
Minister	Period of office	Party
Prime Minister; Oskari Mantere	22 December 1928 – 16 August 1929	National Progressive Party
Minister for Foreign Affairs; Hjalmar Procopé	22 December 1928 – 16 August 1929	Independent
Minister of Justice; Anton Kotonen; Oiva Huttunen	22 December 1928 – 18 February 1929; 18 February 1929 – 26 September 1929	Independent
Minister of Defence; Aimo Kaarlo Cajander	22 December 1928 – 16 August 1929	Agrarian League
Minister of the Interior; Toivo Kivimäki	22 December 1928 – 16 August 1929	National Progressive Party
Minister of Finance; Hugo Relander	22 December 1928 – 16 August 1929	Independent
Minister of Education; Lauri Ingman	22 December 1928 – 16 August 1929	Independent
Minister of Agriculture; Eemil Linna	22 December 1928 – 16 August 1929	National Progressive Party
Deputy Minister of Agriculture; Uuno Brander	22 December 1928 – 16 August 1929	National Progressive Party
Minister of Transport and Public Works; Jalmar Castrén	22 December 1928 – 16 August 1929	Independent
Minister of Trade and Industry; Kyösti Järvinen	22 December 1928 – 16 August 1929	Independent
Minister of Social Affairs; Niilo A. Mannio	22 December 1928 – 16 August 1929	National Progressive Party

Preceded by Sunila I	Cabinet of Finland; 22 December 1928 – 16 August 1929	Succeeded by Kallio III
