= Kallio III cabinet =

17th government of the Republic of Finland

Kallio III Cabinet
- 17th Cabinet of Finland
- Date formed: 16 August 1929
- Date dissolved: 4 July 1930

People and organisations
- Prime Minister: Kyösti Kallio
- Total no. of members: 14
- Member party: Agrarian League

History
- Predecessor: Mantere
- Successor: Svinhufvud II

Kyösti Kallio's third cabinet was the 17th government of the Republic of Finland. Cabinet's time period was from 16 August 1929 to 4 July 1930. It was a majority government only formed by the Agrarian League.

Assembly
Minister	Period of office	Party
Prime Minister; Kyösti Kallio	16 August 1929 – 4 July 1930	Agrarian League
Minister for Foreign Affairs; Hjalmar Procopé	16 August 1929 – 4 July 1930	Independent
Minister of Justice; Elieser Kaila	16 August 1929 – 4 July 1930	Agrarian League
Minister of Defence; Juho Niukkanen	16 August 1929 – 4 July 1930	Agrarian League
Minister of the Interior; Arvo Linturi	16 August 1929 – 4 July 1930	Independent
Minister of Finance; Tyko Reinikka	16 August 1929 – 4 July 1930	Agrarian League
Minister of Education; Antti Kukkonen	16 August 1929 – 4 July 1930	Agrarian League
Minister of Agriculture; Kaarle Ellilä	16 August 1929 – 4 July 1930	Agrarian League
Deputy Minister of Agriculture; Antti Junes	16 August 1929 – 4 July 1930	Agrarian League
Minister of Transport and Public Works; Jalo Lahdensuo	16 August 1929 – 4 July 1930	Agrarian League
Minister of Trade and Industry; Pekka Heikkinen	16 August 1929 – 4 July 1930	Agrarian League
Minister of Social Affairs; Herman Paavilainen	16 August 1929 – 4 July 1930	Independent
Deputy Minister of Social Affairs; Juhani Leppälä	16 August 1929 – 4 July 1930	Agrarian League
Minister without portfolio Juhani Leppälä	16 August 1929 – 4 July 1930	Agrarian League

Preceded by Mantere	Cabinet of Finland; 16 August 1929 – 4 July 1930	Succeeded by Svinhufvud II
