= 2016 National Coalition Party leadership election =

← 2014	11 June 2016
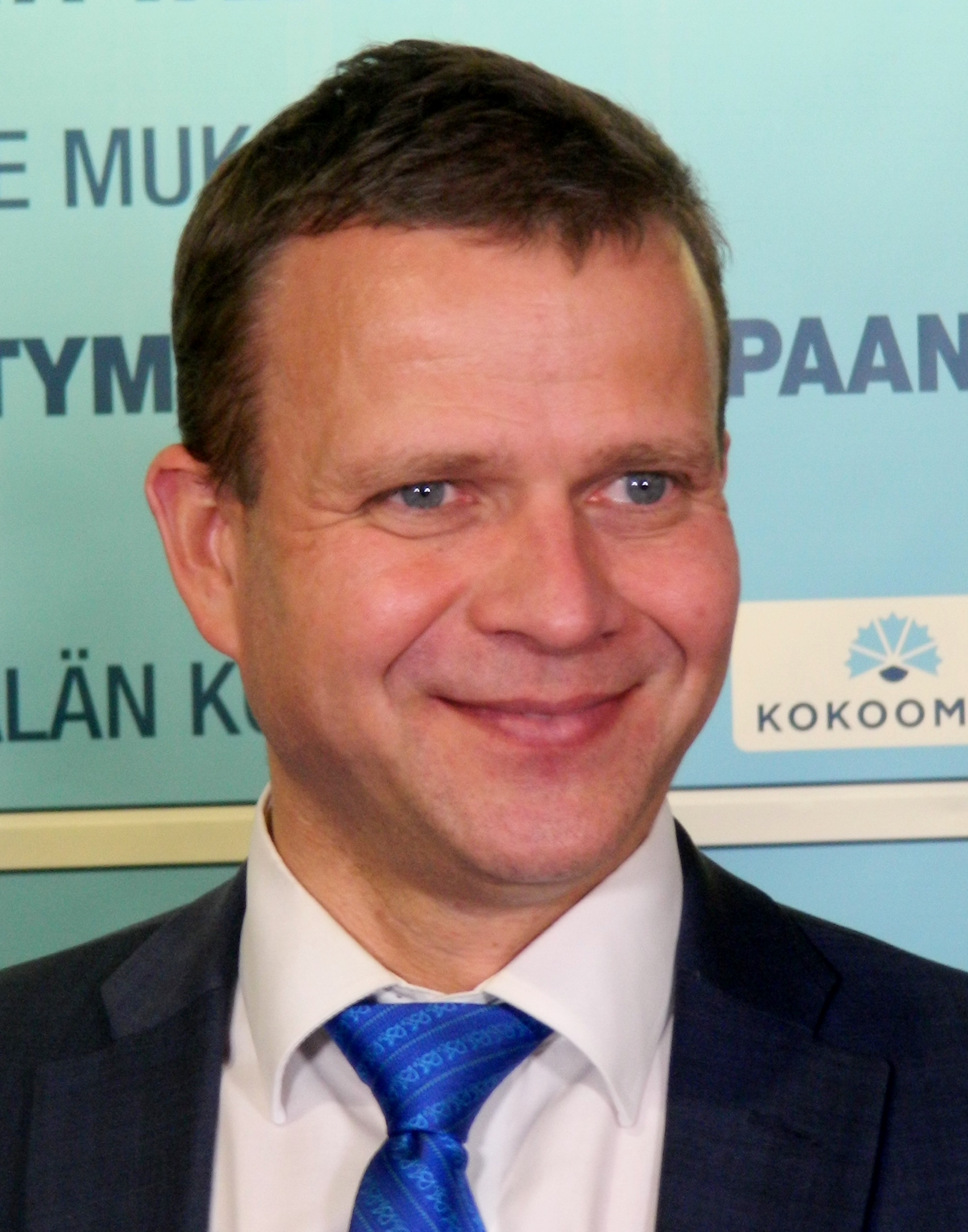

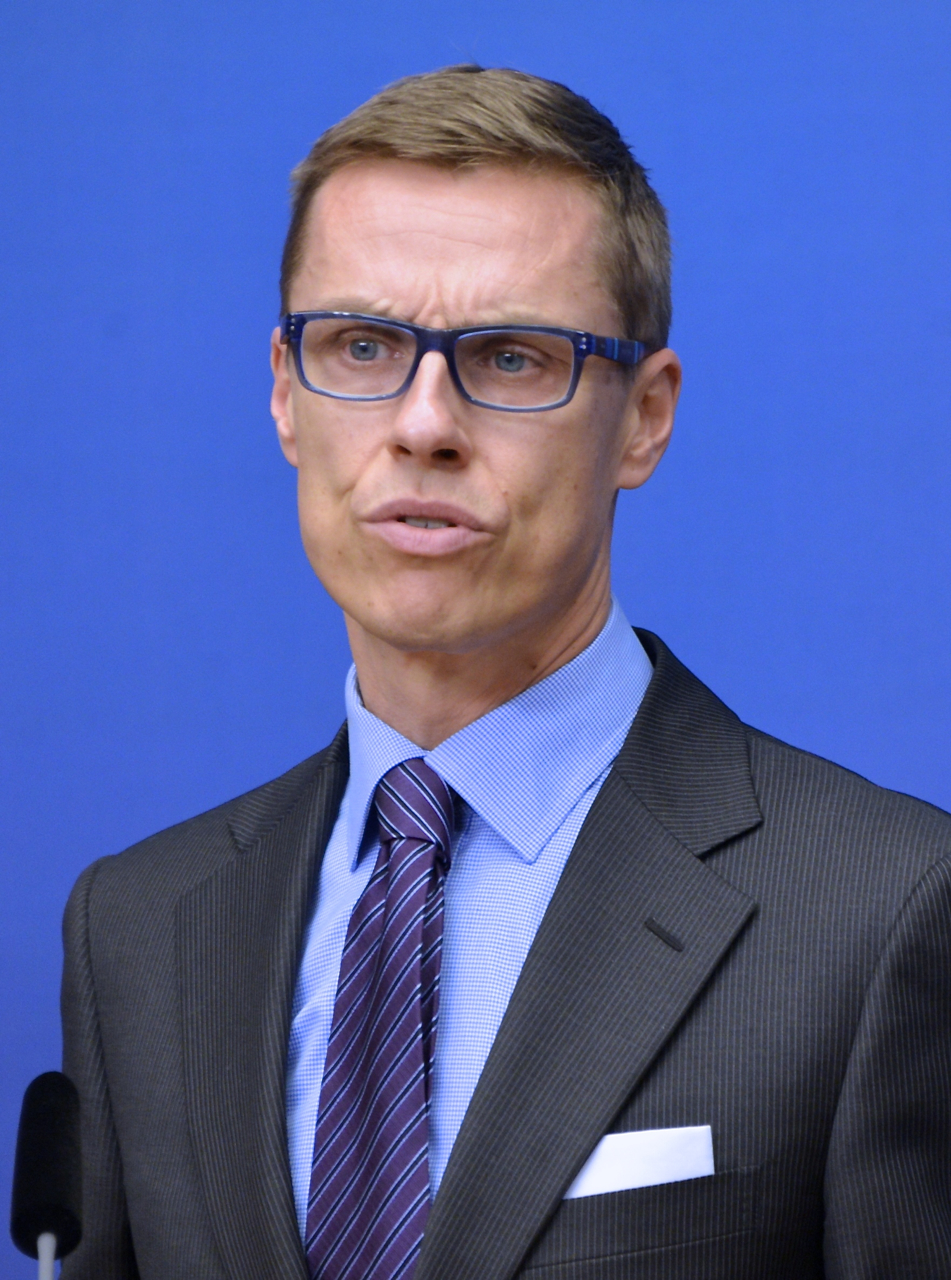

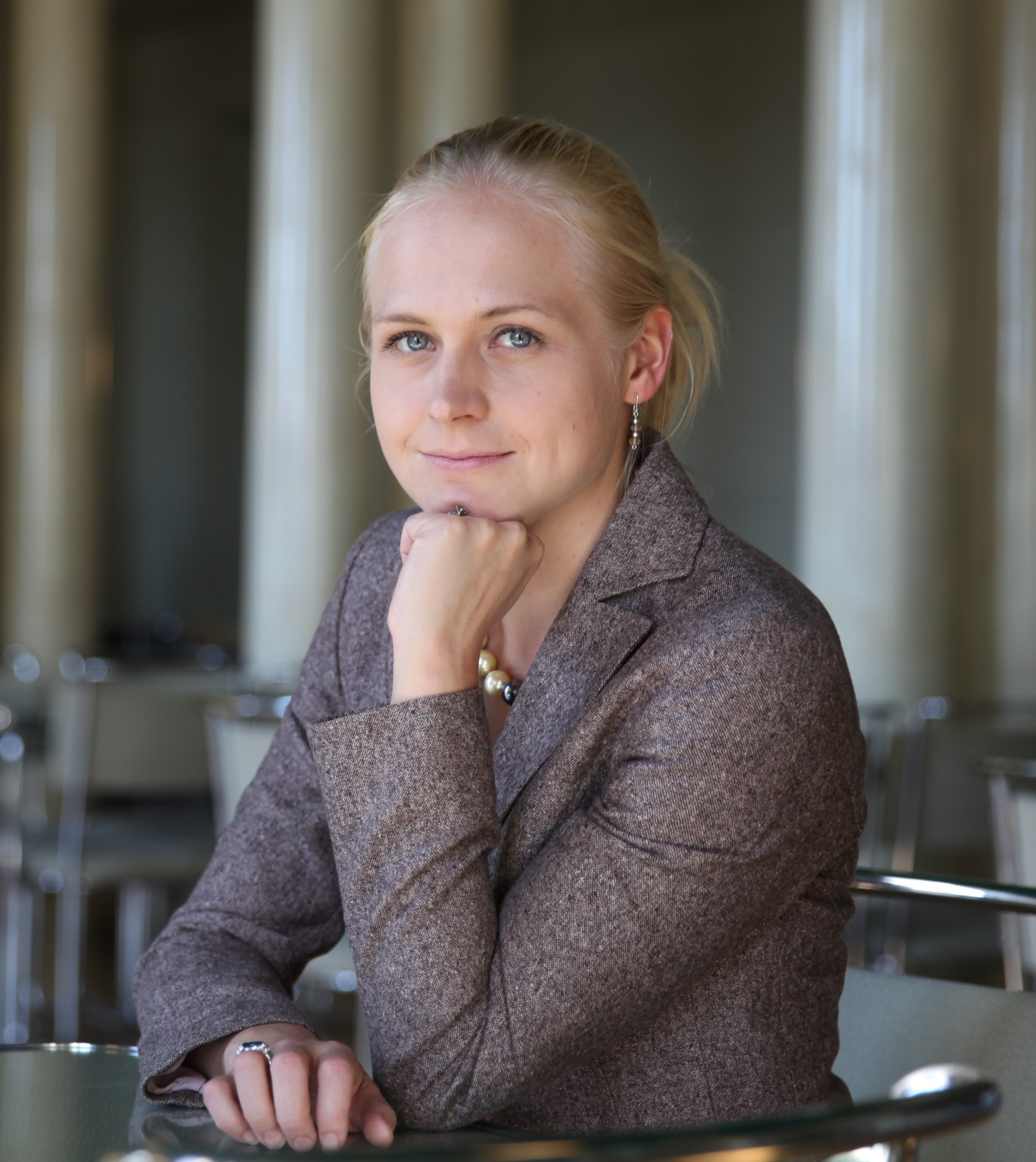
Candidate	Petteri Orpo	Alexander Stubb	Elina Lepomäki
Popular vote	396.8 (1st round); 441.4 (2nd round)	294.4 (1st round); 361 (2nd round)	122.4 (1st round)
Percentage	48.8% (1st round); 55.0% (2nd round)	36.2% (1st round); 45.0% (2nd round)	15.0% (1st round)
Chair before election
Alexander Stubb
Elected Chair
Petteri Orpo

The National Coalition Party leadership election, 2016 was held in Lappeenranta, Finland on 11 June 2016, to elect the chair of the National Coalition Party. In the election, Alexander Stubb, the incumbent party chair and Minister of Finance, was defeated by Petteri Orpo, the Minister of the Interior. Elina Lepomäki, a Member of the Parliament, finished third. After the leadership election, Orpo took Stubb's post as the Minister of Finance.

This was the first time when an incumbent chair of the National Coalition Party lost a leadership election.
