= Heikki Koski =

Finnish politician (1940–2024)

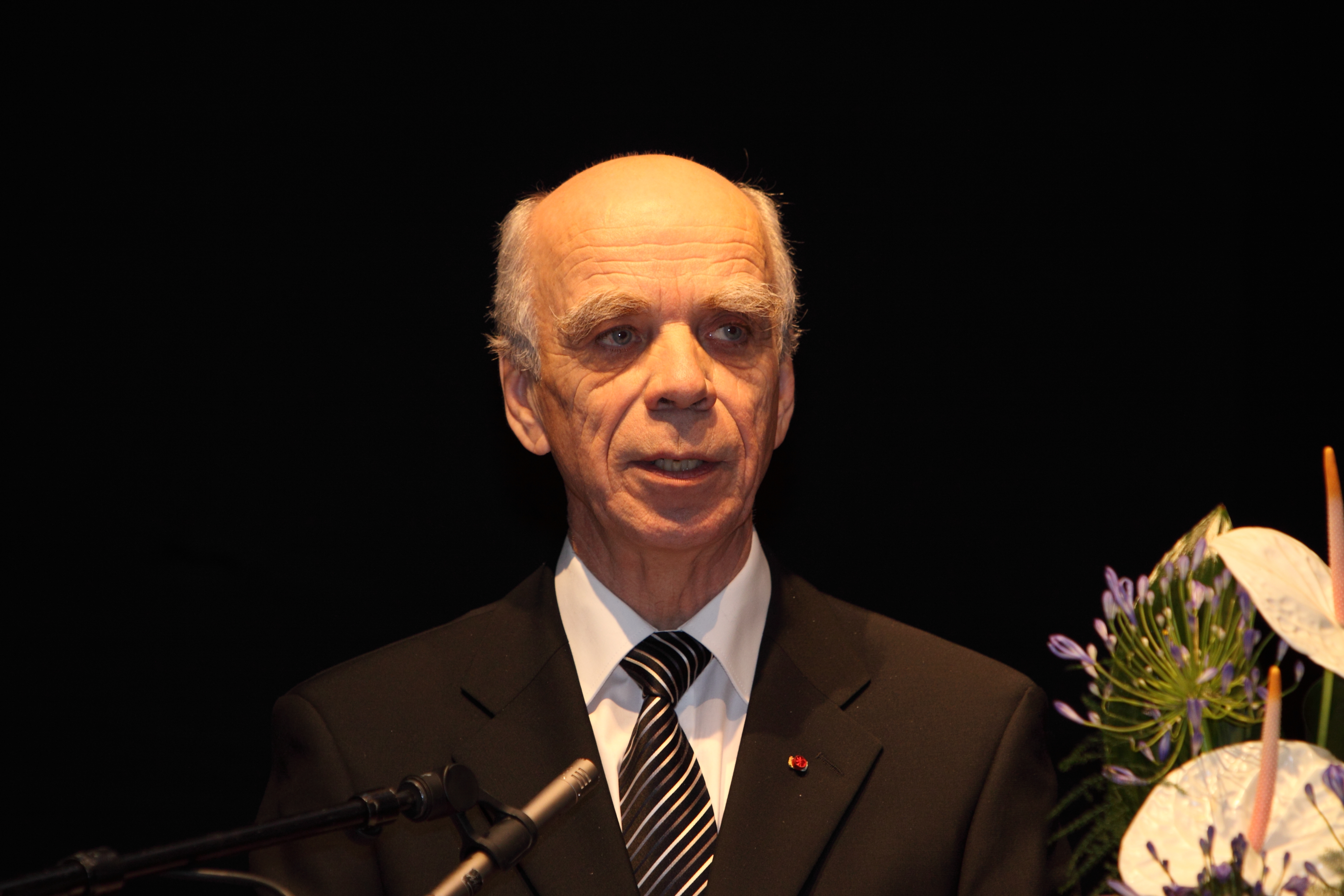
- Koski in 2008

Minister of the Interior
- In office 13 June 1975 – 30 November 1975
- Preceded by: Heikki Tuominen
- Succeeded by: Paavo Tiilikainen

Governor of Western Finland Province
- In office 1997–2003
- Preceded by: office established
- Succeeded by: Rauno Saari

Personal details
- Born: Heikki Juhani Koski; 24 June 1940 Halikko, Finland
- Died: 2 December 2024 (aged 84)
- Party: SD
- Education: University of Tampere
- Occupation: Civil servant

Heikki Juhani Koski (24 June 1940 – 2 December 2024) was a Finnish civil servant and politician. A member of the Social Democratic Party, he served as minister of the interior from June to November 1975 and was governor of Western Finland Province from 1997 to 2003.

Koski died in December 2024, at the age of 84.
