= Toivo Mikael Kivimäki =

Prime minister of Finland from 1932 to 1936

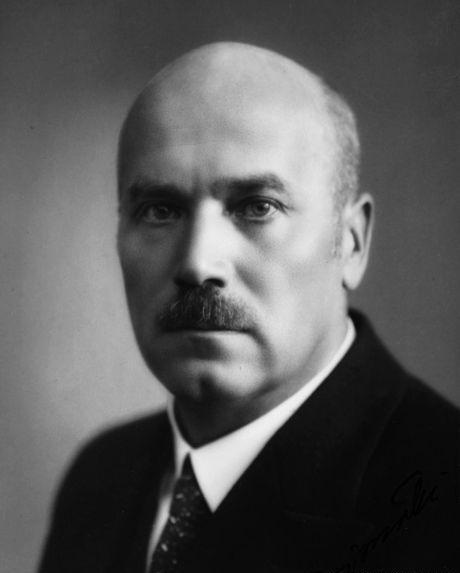

13th Prime Minister of Finland
- In office 14 December 1932 – 7 October 1936
- President: Pehr Evind Svinhufvud
- Preceded by: Juho Sunila
- Succeeded by: Kyösti Kallio

Minister of Justice
- In office 21 March 1931 – 14 December 1932
- Prime Minister: Juho Sunila
- Preceded by: Karl Söderholm
- Succeeded by: Hugo Malmberg

Minister of the Interior
- In office 22 December 1928 – 16 August 1929
- Prime Minister: Oskari Mantere
- Preceded by: Matti Aura
- Succeeded by: Arvo Linturi

Personal details
- Born: 5 June 1886 Tarvasjoki, Finland
- Died: 6 May 1968 (aged 81) Helsinki
- Party: National Progressive

Toivo Mikael Kivimäki (5 June 1886 – 6 May 1968), (J.D.), was a Finnish politician of the National Progressive Party who served as the head of the department of civil law at Helsinki University 1931–1956, Prime Minister of Finland 1932–1936, and Finland's Envoy to Berlin 1940–1944.

== Early career ==
He was elected as member of the Parliament for terms 1922, 1924-1927 and 1929–1940. Before prime ministership, Kivimäki served as Minister of the Interior 1928-1929 and Minister of Justice 1931–1932.

== After WWII ==
In 1946, Kivimäki together with half-a-dozen other leading politicians were put on "war-responsibility trials" executed under pressure from the Allied victors in World War II. Kivimäki was sentenced to five years in prison after being found responsible for the Continuation War. After Finland signed the Paris Peace Treaties, 1947, and the Finno–Soviet Agreement of Friendship, Cooperation, and Mutual Assistance, 1948, the international situation was deemed somewhat stabilized, and Kivimäki was pardoned. He returned to his career in academia.

== Legacy ==
As with all politicians connected with the Continuation War, Kivimäki was for decades seen in a somewhat critical light. During the era of finlandization, many prominent Finns expressed themselves cautiously on such subjects in order not to disturb sensitive Allied victors of the war; a cautiousness that without doubt influenced Finland's post-war generation's understanding and views.

- As Prime Minister, Kivimäki headed Finland's (until 1987) most long-lived cabinet, aiming at stabilizing the turbulent politics in Finland after the semi-fascist Mäntsälä rebellion had been put down.
- He achieved the reversal of Finland's foreign policy into a neutralist pro-Scandinavian stance, and a Swedish rapprochement, that may well have been prepared for in the most initiated circles, but that in the contemporary tense phase of Finland's language strife was not at all easy to explain to the public opinion.
- As an Envoy to the Third Reich, Kivimäki was in a position to observe the anti-Semitic nature of the Nazi regime and the disappearance of German Jews to concentration camps. Kivimäki succeeded in reversing Nazi Germany's anti-Finnish stance, obtaining support and favours but at the price of Finland having to form an alliance with Hitler. Finland avoided formal treaties with Nazi Germany up until the Ryti–Ribbentrop Agreement, which was signed after the fall of Viipuri in June 1944.

Several individuals and factors were critical for the Winter War and the Continuation War. Kivimäki without any doubt occupies a prominent position among pro-Axis Finnish leaders.

== Cabinets ==
- Kivimäki Cabinet

Political offices
Preceded by Juho Sunila	Prime Minister of Finland; 1932–1936	Succeeded by Kyösti Kallio
Preceded by Karl Söderholm	Minister of Justice; 1931–1932	Succeeded by Hugo Malmberg
Preceded by Matti Aura	Minister of the Interior; 1928–1929	Succeeded by Arvo Linturi
