= Gustaf Idman =

Finnish diplomat and non-partisan Minister of Foreign Affairs (1885–1961)

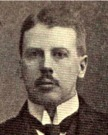

Minister of Foreign Affairs
- In office 31 March 1925 – 31 December 1925
- Prime Minister: Antti Tulenheimo
- Preceded by: Hjalmar Procopé
- Succeeded by: E. N. Setälä

Personal details
- Born: Karl Gustaf Idman; 1 December 1885 Tampere, Finland
- Died: 13 April 1961 (aged 75) Helsinki, Finland
- Occupation: Diplomat

Karl Gustaf Idman (1 December 1885 in Tampere – 13 April 1961 in Helsinki) was a Finnish diplomat and a non-partisan Minister of Foreign Affairs in Antti Tulenheimo's cabinet in 1925.

Idman completed a law doctorate in 1914 and worked in Helsinki University as a professor of international law from 1915 to 1917.

Idman became an official in the Finnish Foreign Office in January 1918 after Finland gained independence. Idman belonged to the delegation which visited St. Petersburg in 1917 and acquired Lenin's approval for Finnish Declaration of Independence.

Idman hold several foreign service positions during his career. He was special envoy in Copenhagen 1919–1927, in Budapest 1922–1927, in Riga and Kaunas 1927–1928, in Prague from 1927 to 1935, in Warsaw 1928-1938 and in Bucharest 1928–1938. During World War II, Idman hold a similar position of a special envoy since October 1939 in Tokyo and also since August 1941 in Mukden (Manchukuo). Idman resigned from the ministry in 1947.

Idman owned Hatanpää Manor in Tampere region. He left in his will money for a foundation that distributes annually grants for approximate million euros to students in Tampere.

Political offices
Preceded by Hjalmar Procopé	Foreign Minister of Finland; 1925	Succeeded by E. N. Setälä
