= Sunila I cabinet =

Government of Finland from 1927 to 1928

Sunila I Cabinet
- 15th Cabinet of Finland
- Date formed: 17 December 1927
- Date dissolved: 22 December 1928

People and organisations
- Prime Minister: Juho Sunila
- Total no. of members: 13
- Member party: Agrarian League
- Status in legislature: Minority government

History
- Predecessor: Tanner
- Successor: Mantere

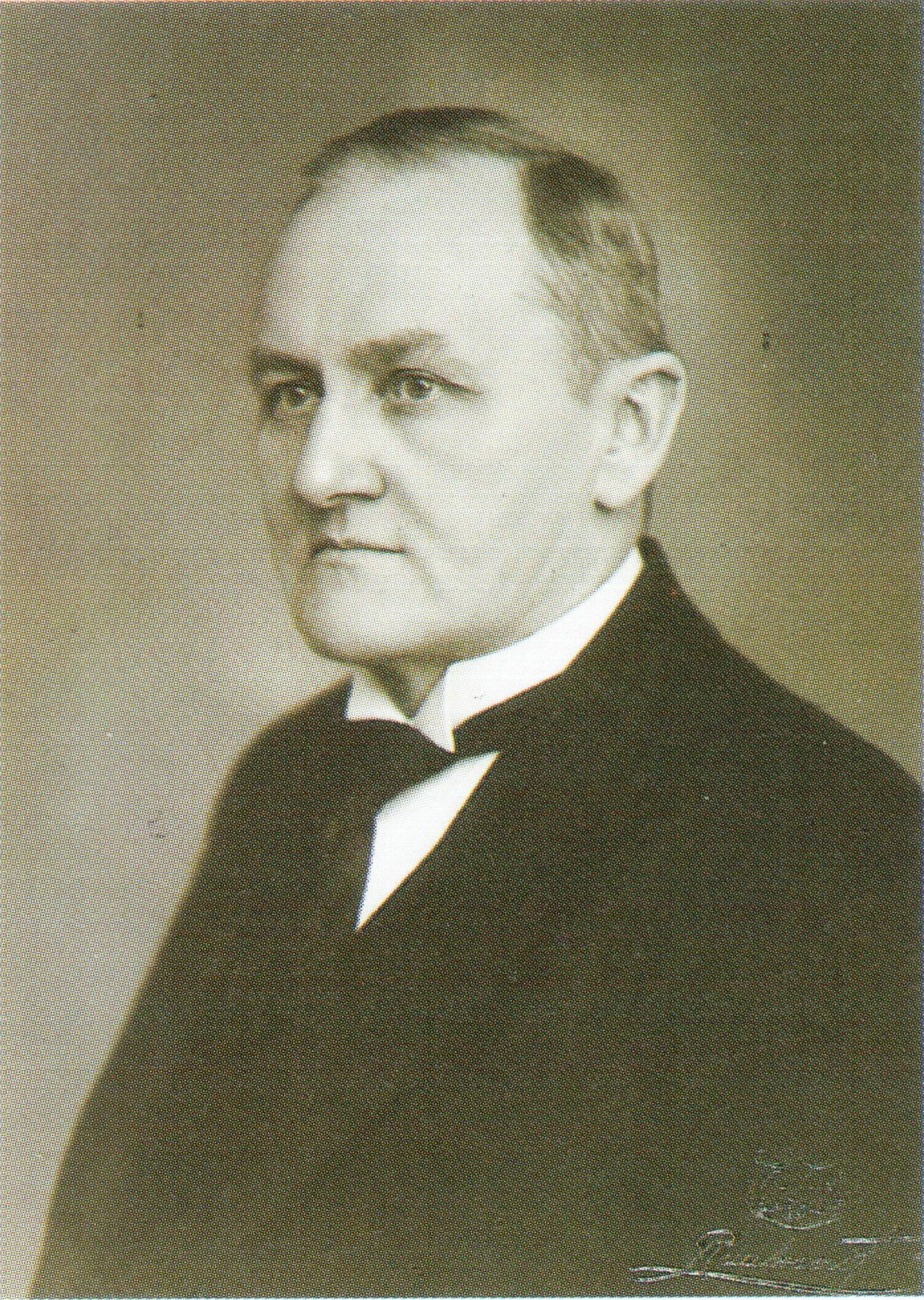
J. E. Sunila.

Juho Sunila's first cabinet was the 15th government of Republic of Finland. Cabinet's time period was from December 17, 1927 to December 22, 1928. It was a minority government.

Assembly
Minister	Period of office	Party
Prime Minister; Juho Sunila	December 17, 1927–December 22, 1928	Agrarian League
Minister for Foreign Affairs; Hjalmar Procopé	December 17, 1927–December 22, 1928	Independent
Minister of Justice; Torsten Malinen	December 17, 1927–December 22, 1928	Independent
Minister of Defence; Jalo Lahdensuo	December 17, 1927–December 22, 1928	Agrarian League
Minister of the Interior; Matti Aura	December 17, 1927–December 22, 1928	Independent
Minister of Finance; Juho Niukkanen	December 17, 1927–December 22, 1928	Agrarian League
Minister of Education; Antti Kukkonen	December 17, 1927–December 22, 1928	Agrarian League
Minister of Agriculture; Sigurd Mattsson	December 17, 1927–December 22, 1928	Agrarian League
Deputy Minister of Agriculture; Vihtori Vesterinen /Kalle Jutila	December 17, 1927–October 16, 1928; October 16, 1928–December 22, 1928	Agrarian League; Agrarian League
Minister of Transport and Public Works; Eemil Hynninen	December 17, 1927–December 22, 1928	Agrarian League
Minister of Trade and Industry; Pekka Heikkinen	December 17, 1927–December 22, 1928	Agrarian League
Minister of Social Affairs; Johan Helo; Kalle Lohi	December 17, 1927–December 22, 1928	Agrarian League; Agrarian League
Minister without portfolio Kalle Jutila	December 17, 1927–December 22, 1928	Agrarian League

Preceded by Tanner	Government of Finland; December 17, 1927–December 22, 1928	Succeeded by Mantere
