= 2014 National Coalition Party leadership election =

14 June 2014	2016 →
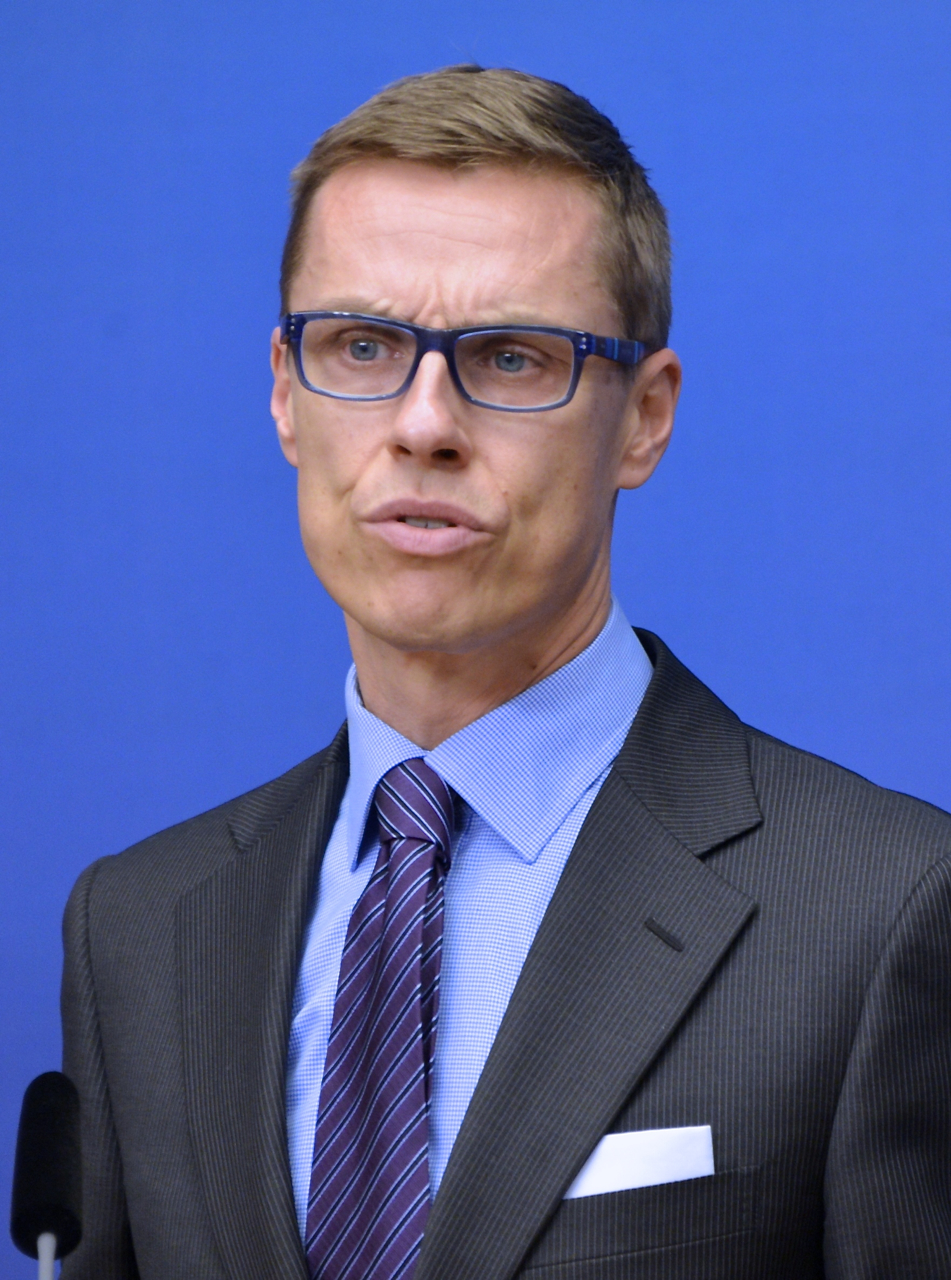

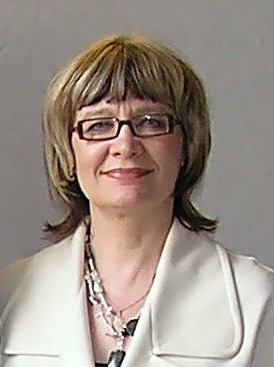

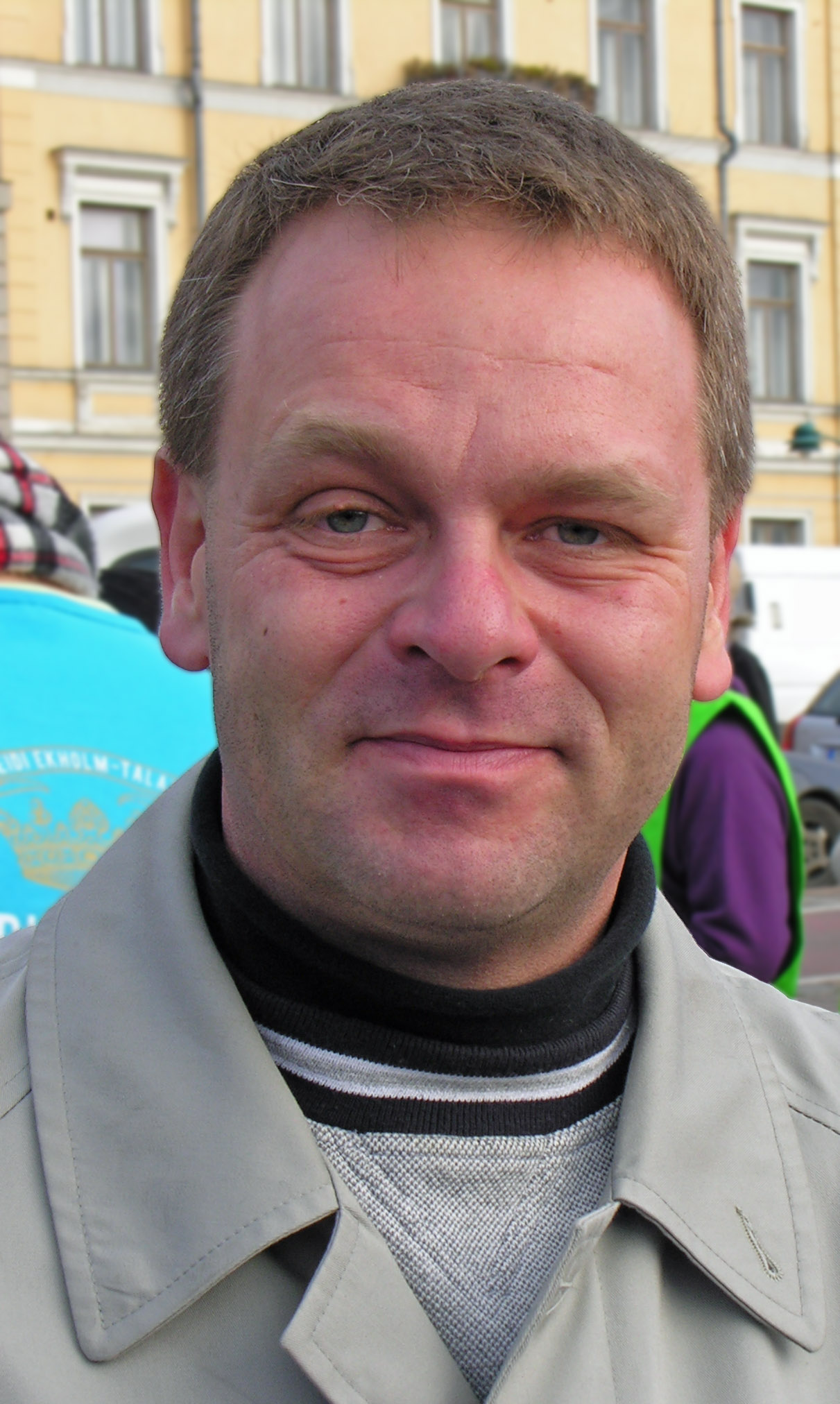
Candidate	Alexander Stubb	Paula Risikko	Jan Vapaavuori
Popular vote	337 (1st round); 500.4 (2nd round)	266.4 (1st round); 349.2 (2nd round)	258.8 (1st round)
Percentage	39.1% (1st round); 58.9% (2nd round)	30.9% (1st round); 41.1% (2nd round)	30.0% (1st round)
Chair before election
Jyrki Katainen
Elected Chair
Alexander Stubb

The 2014 National Coalition Party leadership election was held in Lahti, Finland on 14 June 2014 to elect the new chair of the National Coalition Party. Incumbent party chair and Prime Minister Jyrki Katainen did not run for re-election because he was to be appointed a European commissioner.

Alexander Stubb, the Minister for European Affairs and Foreign Trade, won the leadership election. Paula Risikko, the Minister of Social Affairs and Health, finished second and Jan Vapaavuori, the Minister of Economic Affairs, finished third. On 24 June, Stubb was appointed Prime Minister of Finland. At the same time, Risikko was appointed Minister of Transportation and Local Government and Vapaavuori continued as Minister of Economic Affairs.
