= Hugo Suolahti =

Finnish politician, linguist and philologist

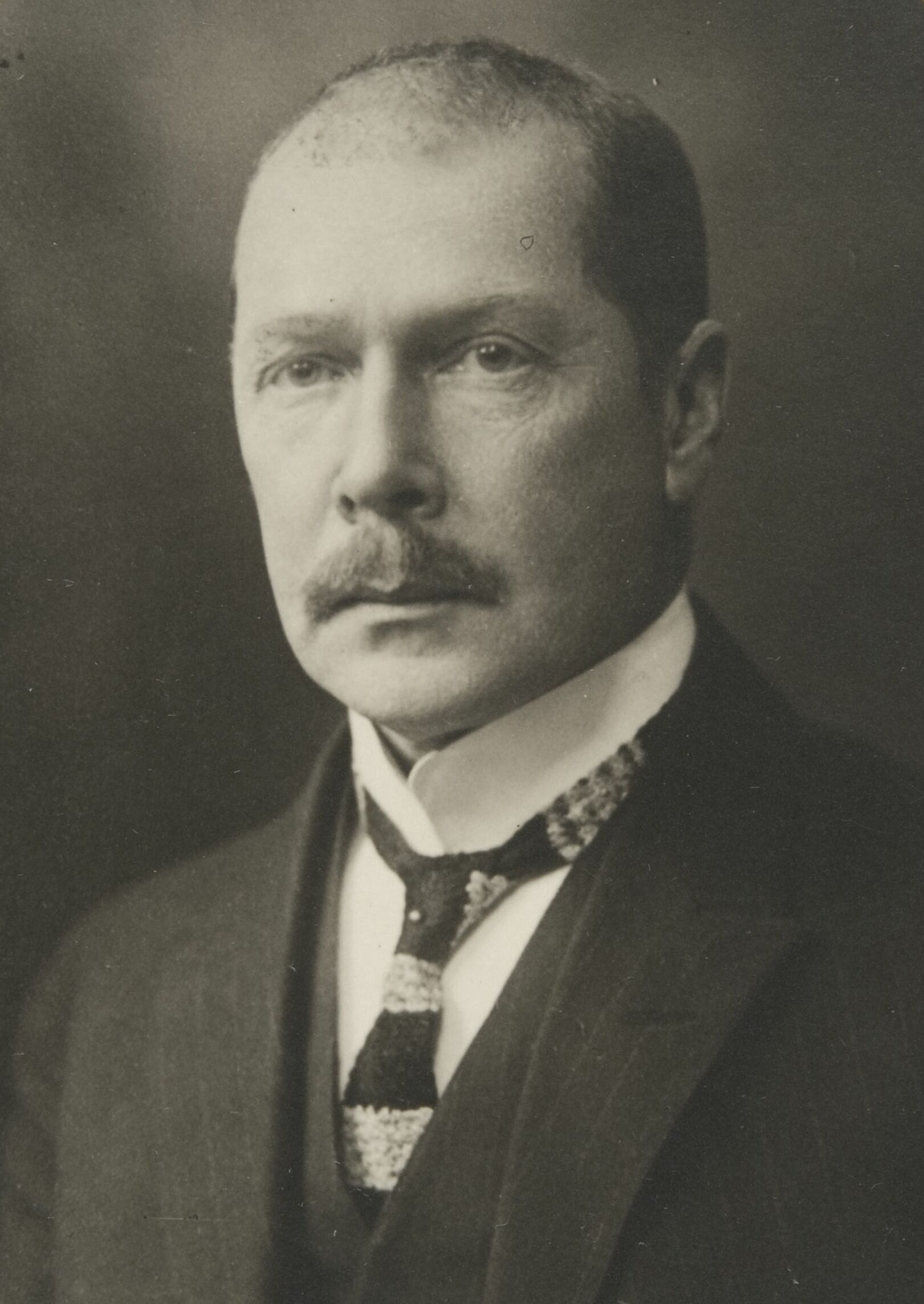
Hugo Suolahti.

Viktor Hugo Suolahti (7 October 1874 in Hämeenlinna – 23 February 1944 in Helsinki) was a Finnish politician, linguist and philologist. Before 1906, he was known as Viktor Hugo Palander.

Philosopher Pentti Linkola was his grandson through his daughter.

== Education and university career ==
Suolahti passed his matriculation examination in 1892 and received his master's from the University of Helsinki in 1896. Suolahti became a Doctor of Philosophy in 1900. In 1901, he became a docent of German Philology at the University of Helsinki and in 1911, he became a professor of the same subject, a post he occupied for more than 40 years, until 1941. Suolahti specialized mainly in etymology and his work on words and vocabulary had a significant impact on Finnish research pertaining to German Philology.

Suolahti was also an important administrator at the university. First, he served as vice-rector of the University of Helsinki from 1917 to 1923, and then as rector from 1923 to 1926 and finally as chancellor from 1926 to 1944.

== Political career ==
He was a member of the National Coalition Party and was the first chairman of the party between 1918 and 1919. He was re-elected its leader in 1925, following the administration of Antti Tulenheimo.

Educational offices
| Preceded by Ivar Heikel | Rector of Helsinki University; 1923–1926 | Succeeded by Antti Tulenheimo |
