= Finnish People's Party =

Finnish People's Party (Finnish: Suomalainen Kansanpuolue) was a minor political party in Finland. The party participated in the 1951 parliamentary elections and got 243 votes (0,01%).

It litigated against the similarly named People's Party of Finland (Suomen Kansanpuolue) over the name.

== See also ==
- Politics of Finland
- List of political parties in Finland
- Elections in Finland
