= Paavo Tiilikainen =

Finnish politician

Paavo Herman Tiilikainen (12 July 1923, Ruokolahti – 15 April 2007) was a Finnish politician from the Social Democratic Party.

Tiilikainen worked as lumberyard worker in Ruokolahti and Imatra, and got elected to Imatra city council for terms from 1948 to 1950 and from 1954 to 1984. Between 1963 and 1969, he was a member of the SDP party committee. In 1996, he became an honorary member of the SDP.

He got elected as a member of the parliament from 1970 to 1979, and between 1973 and 1975 he led the SDP parliamentary group as chairman. From November 1975 to September 1976, Tiilikainen served as Minister of the Interior in the cabinet of Martti Miettunen.
