= Antti Junes =

Finnish farmer and politician (1874–1963)

Antti Junes (6 July 1874 – 29 July 1963) was a Finnish farmer and politician, born in Alatornio. He was a member of the Parliament of Finland from 1910 to 1913, from 1919 to 1933 and from 1936 to 1945, representing the Agrarian League. He served as Deputy Minister of Agriculture from 16 August 1929 to 4 July 1930.
