= Martti Viitanen =

Finnish politician (1913–1980)

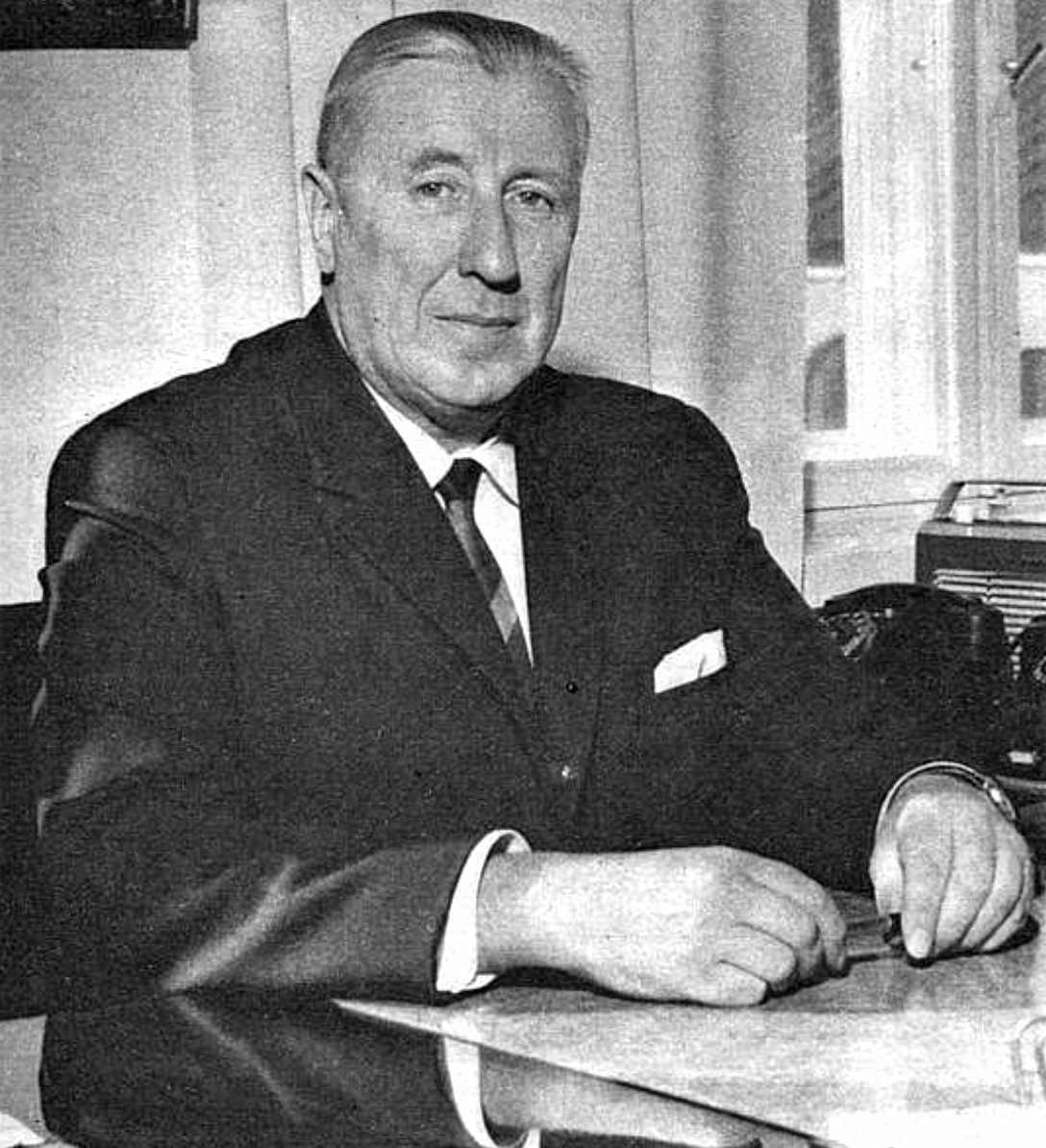
Martti Viitanen

Martti Juho Viitanen (5 January 1913 – 22 January 1980) was a Finnish politician, born in Oulujoki. He was a member of the Social Democratic Party of Finland (SDP). He served as Minister of the Interior from 27 May 1966 to 30 November 1967. Viitanen was the mayor of Lappeenranta from 1954 to 1958 and of Kotka from 1958 to 1967. He was the governor of Vaasa Province from 1967 to 1977.
