= Oskari Mantere =

Prime minister of Finland from 1928 to 1929

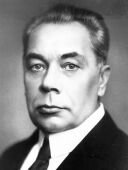

12th Prime Minister of Finland
- In office 22 December 1928 – 16 August 1929
- President: Lauri Kristian Relander
- Preceded by: Juho Sunila
- Succeeded by: Kyösti Kallio

Personal details
- Born: 18 September 1874 Hausjärvi, Finland
- Died: 9 December 1942 (aged 68)
- Party: National Progressive Party

Oskari Mantere (18 September 1874 – 9 December 1942) was a Finnish politician from the National Progressive Party who served as Prime Minister of Finland from December 1928 to August 1929. He led a minority government.

== Cabinets ==
- Mantere Cabinet

Political offices
Preceded by Juho Sunila	Prime Minister of Finland; 1928-1929	Succeeded by Kyösti Kallio
