= Arvo Linturi =

Finnish civil servant and politician (1887–1975)

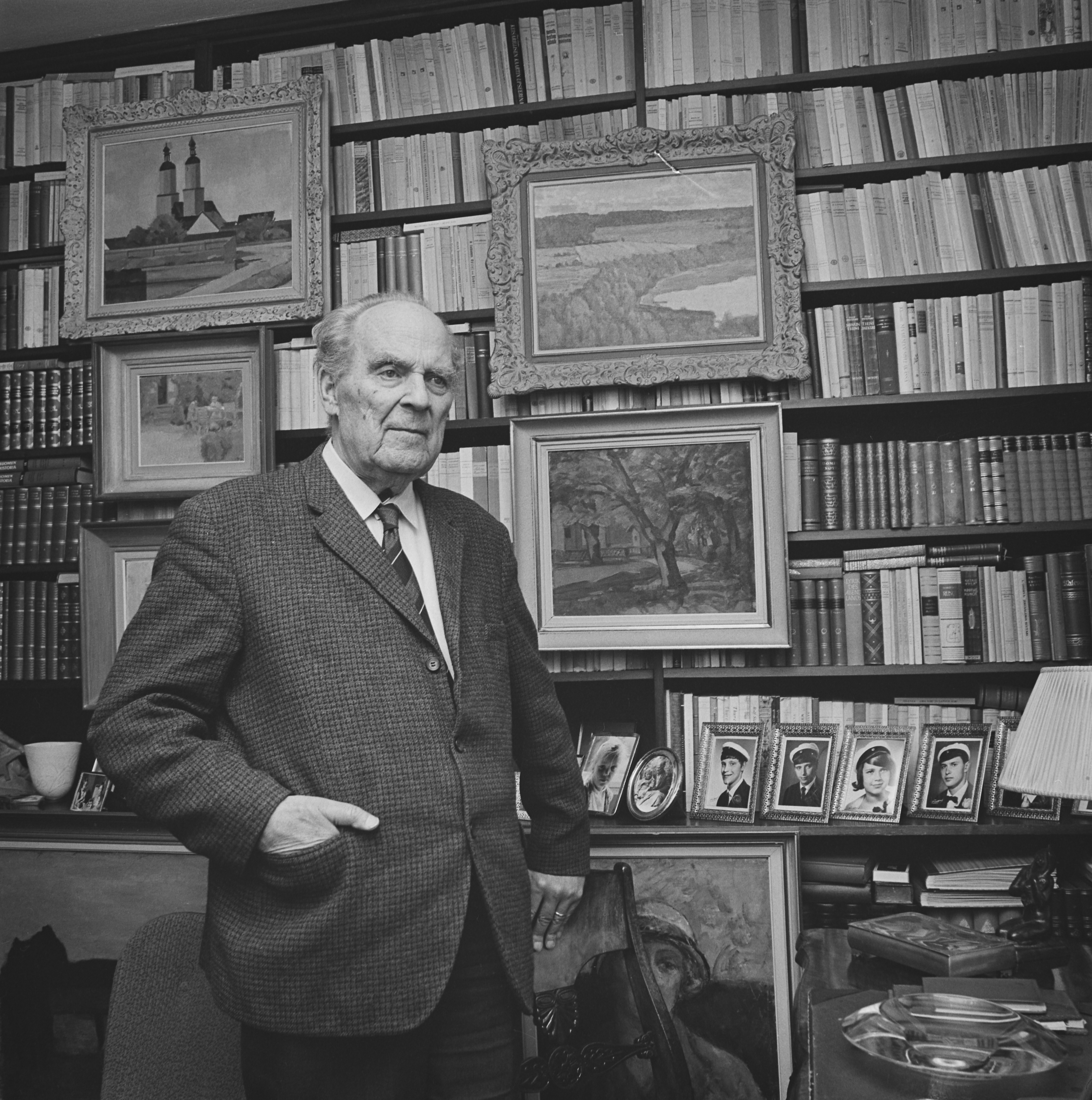

Minister of Interior
- In office 16 August 1929 – 4 July 1930
- Prime Minister: Kyösti Kallio

Personal details
- Born: 23 February 1887 Turku, Finland
- Died: 1975 (aged 97–98)
- Party: National Progressive Party
- Occupation: Civil servant

Arvo Linturi (23 February 1887 – 1975) was a Finnish civil servant. He was the minister of interior between 1929 and 1930.

== Biography ==
Linturi was born in Turku on 23 February 1887. He was a member of the National Progressive Party. He was appointed minister of interior on 16 August 1929 to the third cabinet of Kyösti Kallio. Linturi's term ended on 4 July 1930.

Linturi served as the vice-chairman of the supervisory board of Oy Alkoholiliike Ab, precursor of Alko, which is the national alcoholic beverage retailing company. During his term he supported and introduced moderation in drinking habits of Finnish people.

Linturi died in 1975.
