= Juho Sunila =

Finnish politician (1875–1936)

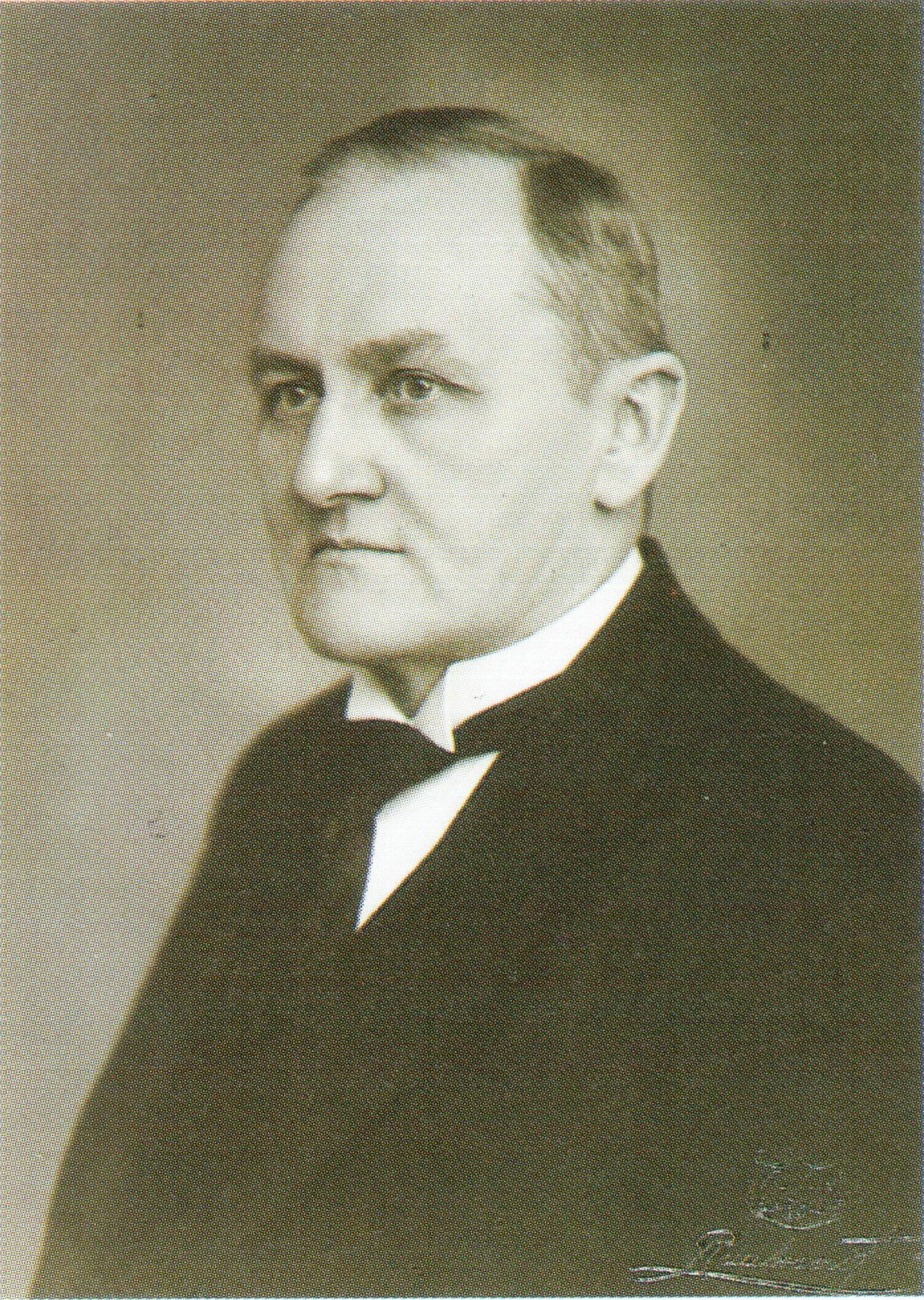

11th Prime Minister of Finland
- In office 21 March 1931 – 14 December 1932
- President: Pehr Evind Svinhufvud
- Preceded by: Pehr Evind Svinhufvud
- Succeeded by: Toivo Mikael Kivimäki
- In office 17 December 1927 – 22 December 1928
- President: Lauri Kristian Relander
- Preceded by: Väinö Tanner
- Succeeded by: Oskari Mantere

Speaker of the Parliament of Finland
- In office 8 July 1930 – 20 October 1930
- Preceded by: Paavo Virkkunen
- Succeeded by: Kyösti Kallio

Minister of Agriculture
- In office 31 March 1925 – 13 December 1926
- Prime Minister: Antti Tulenheimo; Kyösti Kallio
- Preceded by: Ilmari Auer
- Succeeded by: Mauno Pekkala
- In office 14 November 1922 – 18 January 1924
- Prime Minister: Kyösti Kallio
- Preceded by: Östen Elfving
- Succeeded by: Östen Elfving

Personal details
- Born: Johan Emil Sunila; 16 August 1875 Liminka, Finland
- Died: 2 October 1936 (aged 61) Helsinki, Finland
- Party: Agrarian

Johan (Juho) Emil Sunila (16 August 1875 – 2 October 1936) was a Finnish politician from the Agrarian League, the managing director of the agrarian finance board, and Prime Minister of Finland in two cabinets. He was born in Liminka.

After Santeri Alkio had withdrawn from the Parliament of Finland in 1922, Sunila became, in addition to Kyösti Kallio, the second of the Agrarian Party's strong members in the 1920s. Supported by the agrarian-background governor of the province of Viipuri and the President of Finland Lauri Kristian Relander, he supported productive agrarianism, where the attention of politics was concentrated mainly on making agrarianism more effective instead of widespread improvement of the countryside.

Sunila's first cabinet lasted from December 1927 to December 1928 and his second cabinet lasted from March 1931 to December 1932. Before this, Sunila had served as Minister of Agriculture in two of Kyösti Kallio's cabinets and Antti Tulenheimo's cabinet.

Sunila died in Helsinki, aged 61.

== Cabinets ==
- Sunila I Cabinet
- Sunila II Cabinet

Political offices
Preceded by Väinö Tanner	Prime Minister of Finland; 1927–1928	Succeeded by Oskari Mantere
Preceded by Paavo Virkkunen	Speaker of the Parliament of Finland; 1930	Succeeded by Kyösti Kallio
Preceded by Pehr Evind Svinhufvud	Prime Minister of Finland; 1931–1932	Succeeded by Toivo Mikael Kivimäki
