= Kalle Lohi =

Finnish farmer, lay preacher and politician (1872–1948)

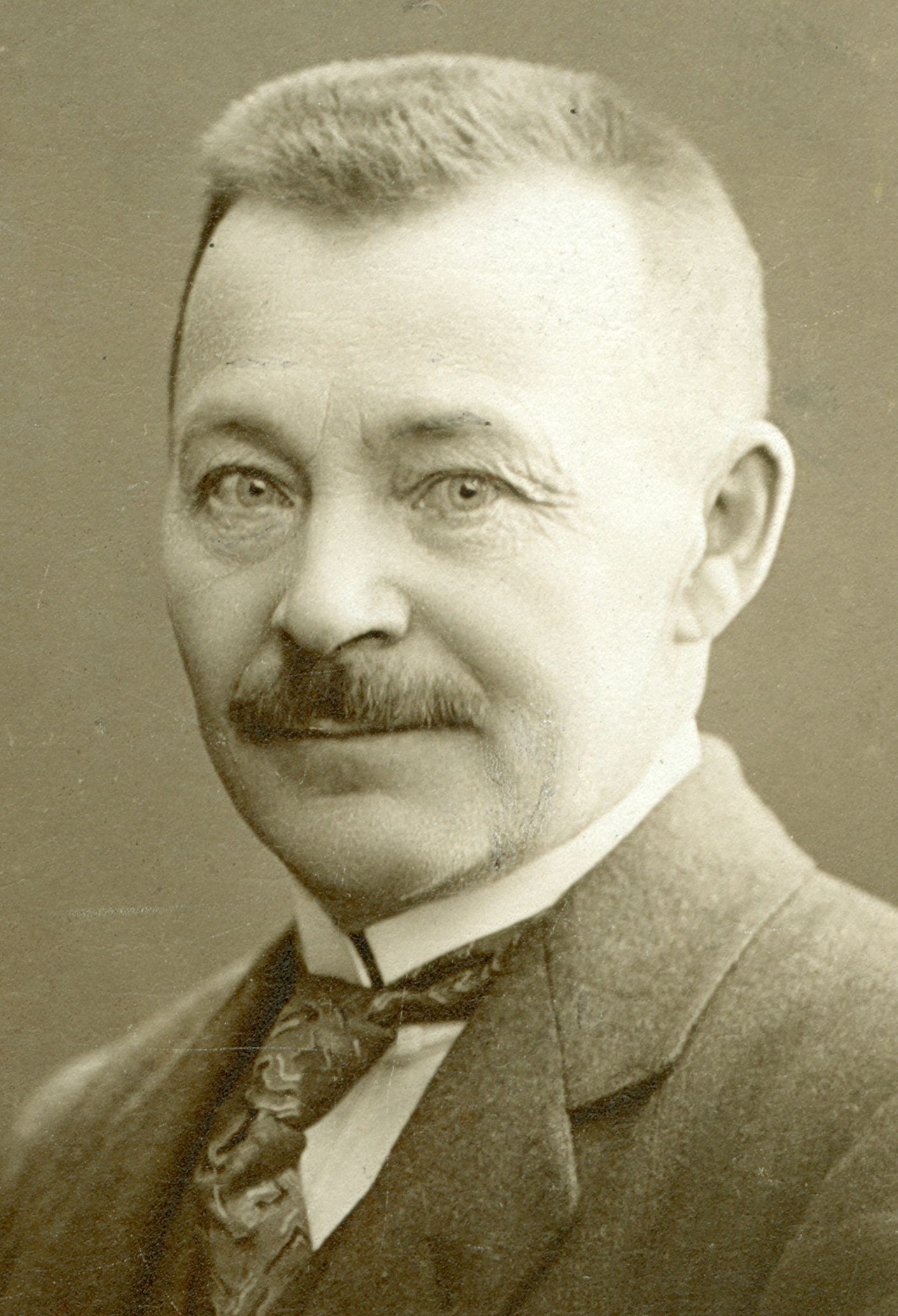
Kalle Lohi

Kalle Aukusti (K. A.) Lohi (23 November 1872 – 11 June 1948) was a Finnish farmer, lay preacher and politician, born in Pudasjärvi. He was a member of the Parliament of Finland from 1909 to 1945, representing the Agrarian League. He served as Minister without portfolio from 31 March to 31 December 1925 and as Minister of Social Affairs from 31 December 1925 to 13 December 1926, from 17 December 1927 to 22 December 1928 and from 20 October to 14 December 1932.
