= Antti Tulenheimo =

Prime minister of Finland in 1925

Ylipormestari (High Mayor) Antti Tulenheimo
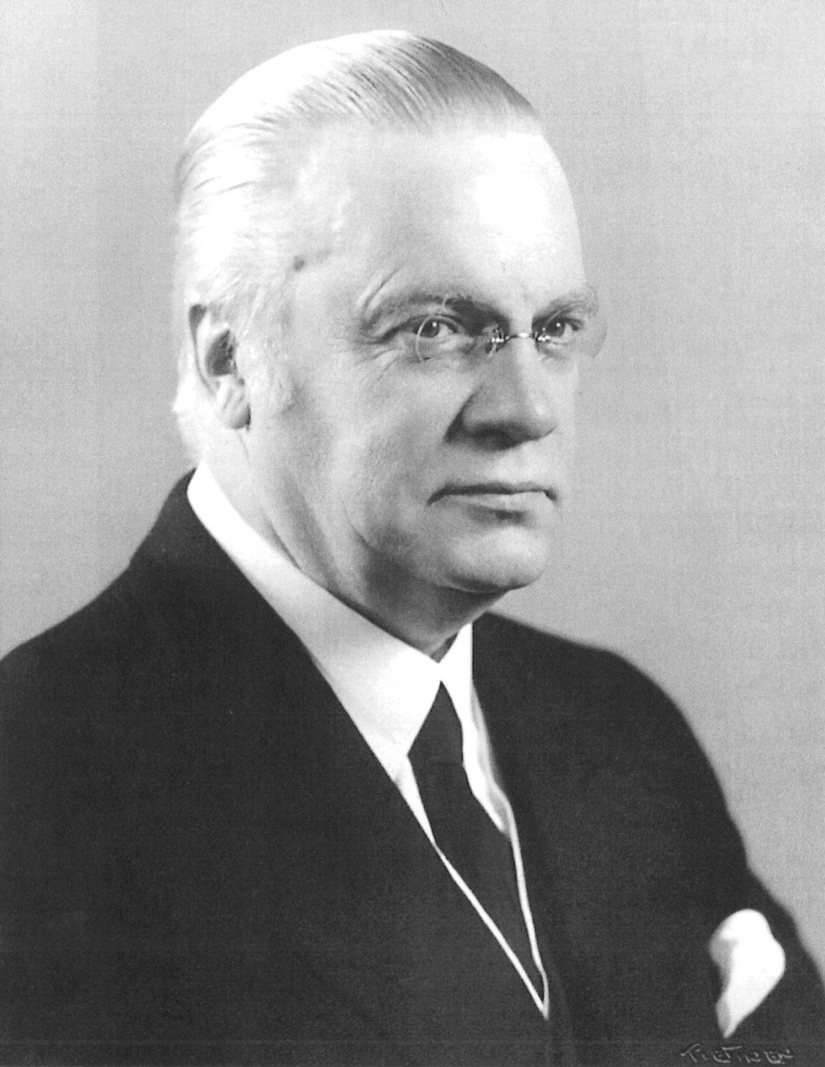
- Antti Tulenheimo in 1939.

9th Prime Minister of Finland
- In office 31 March 1925 – 31 December 1925
- President: Lauri Kristian Relander
- Preceded by: Lauri Ingman
- Succeeded by: Kyösti Kallio

Personal details
- Born: 4 December 1879 Kangasala, Finland
- Died: 3 September 1952 (aged 72) Helsinki, Finland
- Party: National Coalition Party
- Spouse: Lilli Tulenheimo
- Education: University of Helsinki
- Profession: Professor of criminal law

Antti Agathon Tulenheimo (4 December 1879 – 3 September 1952) was a Finnish politician from the National Coalition Party who served as Prime Minister of Finland in 1925.

He was also minister of the interior from November 1918 to April 1919. He was also mayor of Helsinki between 1931–1944 and rector of the University of Helsinki 1926–1930.

== Cabinets ==
- Tulenheimo Cabinet

Government offices
Preceded by Lauri Ingman	Prime Minister of Finland; 1925	Succeeded by Kyösti Kallio
Educational offices
Preceded by Hugo Suolahti	Rector of Helsinki University; 1926–1930	Succeeded by Karl Robert Brotherus
