= National Coalition Party =

Centre-right political party in Finland

National Coalition Party Kansallinen Kokoomus (Finnish) Samlingspartiet (Swedish)
- Abbreviation: Finnish: Kok; Swedish: Saml
- Chairperson: Petteri Orpo
- Secretary: Maggie Keskinen
- Parliamentary group leader: Jukka Kopra
- Deputy chairs: Antti Häkkänen; Anna-Kaisa Ikonen; Karoliina Partanen
- Founded: 9 December 1918; 107 years ago
- Merger of: Finnish Party, Young Finnish Party
- Headquarters: Töölönkatu 3, 00100 Helsinki
- Newspaper: Nykypäivä Verkkouutiset
- Think tank: Ajatuspaja Toivo
- Youth wing: Kokoomusnuoret
- Women's wing: Kokoomuksen Naisten Liitto
- Student wing: Tuhatkunta
- Children's wing: Lastenliitto
- LGBT wing: Kasary
- Swedish-speaking wing: Borgerlig Samling i Finland
- Membership (2021): ▼ c. 27,000
- Ideology: Liberal conservatism Pro-Europeanism
- Political position: Centre-right
- European affiliation: European People's Party
- European Parliament group: European People's Party Group
- International affiliation: International Democracy Union
- Nordic affiliation: Conservative Group
- Colours: Dark blue
- Eduskunta: 48 / 200
- European Parliament: 4 / 15
- Municipalities: 1,592 / 8,586
- County seats: 281 / 1,379

Website
- kokoomus.fi

The National Coalition Party (NCP; Finnish: Kansallinen Kokoomus [ˈkɑnsɑlːinen ˈko̞ko̞ːmus], Kok; Swedish: Nationella Samlingspartiet, Saml) is a liberal conservative and conservative liberal political party in Finland. It is the current governing political party.

Founded in 1918, the National Coalition Party is one of the "big three" parties that have dominated Finnish national politics for several decades, along with the Social Democratic Party and the Centre Party. The current party chair is Petteri Orpo, elected on 11 June 2016. The party self-statedly bases its politics on "freedom, education, equality of opportunities, and democracy". Their foreign stances are pro-NATO and pro-European oriented, the party is also a member of the European People's Party (EPP). The party is described by literature as a conservative as well as a party on the centre-right, with catch-all characteristics.

The party's vote share has been approximately 20% in parliamentary elections since the 1990s and has only been out of coalition governments for eight years since then. It won 44 out of 200 seats in the parliamentary elections of 2011, becoming the largest party in the Finnish Parliament (Finnish: Eduskunta; Swedish: Riksdagen) for the first time in its history. On the municipal level, it emerged as the most popular party for the first time in 2008. More recently, the NCP became the largest party during the Finnish 2023 general election, with 48 seats, and has been the leading party in the governing Orpo cabinet since 20 June 2023. Incumbent President of Finland Alexander Stubb is affiliated with the NCP, as was his immediate predecessor, Sauli Niinistö.

== History ==
=== 1918–1939 ===
Lion of the National Coalition

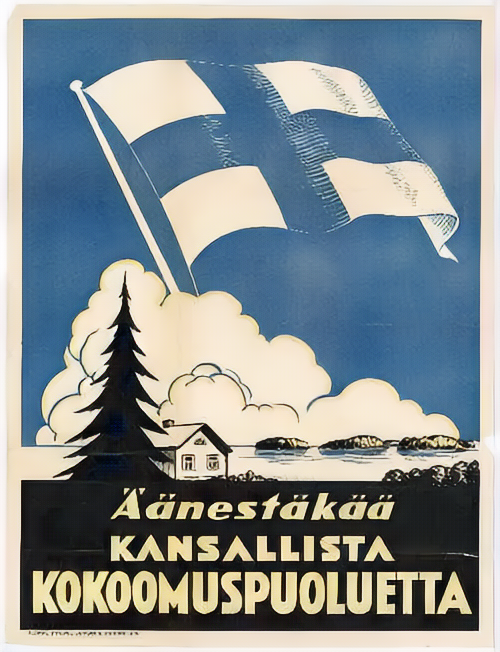
Finnish election poster from 1933

The National Coalition Party was founded on 9 December 1918 after the Finnish Civil War by the majority of the Finnish Party and the minority of the Young Finnish Party, both supporting Prince Frederick Charles of Hesse as the King of Finland in the new monarchy. The previous day, the republicans of both parties had founded the National Progressive Party. With over 600 representatives, the foundational meeting of NCP declared the following:

A national coalition is needed over old party lines that have lost meaning and have too long separated similarly thinking citizens. This coalition's grand task must be to work to strengthen in our nation the forces that maintain society. Lawful societal order must be strictly upheld and there must be no compromise with revolutionary aspirations. But simultaneously, determined constructive reform work must be pursued."

The party sought to accomplish their task by advocating for constitutional monarchy and, failing that, strong governmental powers within a republican framework. On the other hand, their goal was to implement a number of social and economic reforms, such as compulsory education, universal health care, and progressive income and property taxation. The monarchist aims failed and Finland became a parliamentary republic—in which the NCP advocated for strong presidential powers. In the late 1920s and early 1930s, the fear of Joseph Stalin's communist Soviet Union influenced Finnish politics. The Communists, backed by the Soviet leaders, accelerated their activities while the ideological position of the National Coalition Party shifted over to very conservative. The new ideology was poorly received, particularly by the youth, attracting instead more irredentist and fascist movements, such as the Academic Karelia Society or Patriotic People's Movement.

In the 1933 parliamentary election, the party formed an electoral coalition with the Patriotic People's Movement, founded by former supporters of the radical and nationalist Lapua Movement—even though P.E. Svinhufvud, the party's first President of Finland, played a key role in halting the Lapua Movement and vanquishing their Mäntsälä rebellion. The result was a major defeat as the NCP lost 24 of its 42 seats in parliament. The NCP broke ties with the Patriotic People's Movement in 1934 under their newly elected party chair, Juho Kusti Paasikivi, but were nevertheless shut out from the Finnish Government until the outbreak of the Winter War in 1939, only slowly managing to regain their support.

=== 1939–2000 ===
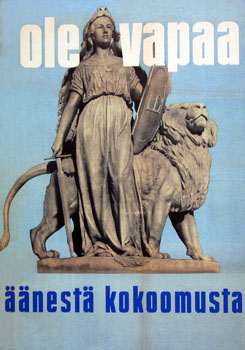
Election poster from 1948. "Be free, vote for the Coalition", written in Finnish

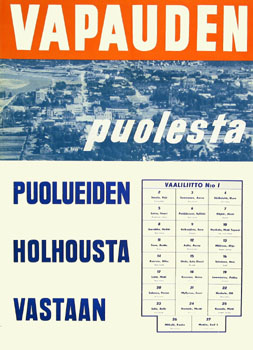
National Coalition election poster from 1953

During the Winter War and the Continuation War in 1939–1944, the party took part in the war-time national unity governments and generally had strong support for its government policies. After the wars, the National Coalition Party sought to portray itself as a defender of democracy against the resurgent Finnish communists. Chair Paasikivi, who had advocated making more concessions to Soviet Union before the Winter War and taken a cautious line regarding cooperation with Germany before the Continuation War, acted first as Prime Minister of Finland (1944–1946) and then as President (1946–1956) of Finland. Paasikivi is remembered as the formulator of Finnish foreign policy after World War II. The conflict between the NCP and the communist Finnish People's Democratic League culminated when President Paasikivi fired the communist Minister of the Interior Yrjö Leino, who had used the State Police to spy on the party's youth wing among other abuses.

In 1951, the party changed its official name from the original Kansallinen Kokoomuspuolue to the current Kansallinen Kokoomus. The 1950s were also a time of ideological shifts, as the emphasis on individual liberty and free market reforms increased at the expense of social conservatism and maintenance of a strong government. A minor division in 1958 led to the formation of the Christian Democrats party. From 1966 to 1987, the party was in the opposition. By criticizing Finnish communists and President Urho Kekkonen of the Centre Party, the party had lost the President's trust—and thus governments formed by the Centre Party and left-wing parties followed one another. A new guard emerged within the NCP in the 1970s that sought to improve relations with long-serving President Kekkonen. Their work was partially successful in the late 1970s. However, even though the NCP supported Kekkonen for president in 1978 and became the second largest party in the country in the 1979 parliamentary election, a spot in the government continued to elude the NCP until the end of Kekkonen's time in office.

During the long years in opposition, the party's support grew steadily and in 1987 it attained the best parliamentary election result in its history so far. Harri Holkeri became the party's first prime minister since Paasikivi. During Holkeri's time in office, the Finnish economy suffered a downturn, precipitated by a multitude of factors, and the 1991 parliamentary election resulted in a loss. The party continued in government as a minor partner until 2003.

=== 2000–present ===
Multicolour logo of the party before its rebranding in 2020

After losing six seats in the 2003 parliamentary election, the National Coalition Party spent the next electoral period in opposition. Jyrki Katainen was elected party chair in 2004 and in March 2006, vice-president of the European People's Party (EPP). Under the leadership of Katainen, chair until 2014, liberalism became the main attribute of the party. In the 2007 parliamentary election, the party increased its share to 50 seats in the largest gain of the election. The party held a close second place in Parliament, shy of the Centre Party and its 51 seats. After the election, the party entered into a coalition government together with the Centre Party, the Green League, and the Swedish People's Party. The NCP secured important ministerial portfolios, including finance and foreign affairs. In the 2011 parliamentary election, the party finished first place for the first time in its history with 44 seats, despite losing six seats, and party chair Jyrki Katainen formed his cabinet as a six-party coalition government from parties on the left and on the right after lengthy negotiations.

Parliamentary election poster from 2019. "We believe in Finland", written in Finnish

The National Coalition Party's candidate in the 2006 Finnish presidential election was former minister of finance and former party chair Sauli Niinistö. He qualified for the second round runoff as one of the top two candidates in the first round but was defeated by the incumbent Tarja Halonen with 51.8% of the vote against his 48.2%. The party nominated Sauli Niinistö again for the presidential election of 2012. Niinistö won the election, beating his Green League opponent Pekka Haavisto decisively on the second round with a 62.6% portion of the votes, and thus becoming the third president elected from the party and the first one since 1956. Niinistö's margin of victory was larger than that of any previous directly elected president in Finland. He won a majority in 14 of the country's 15 electoral districts. Niinistö is described as a pragmatical fiscal conservative and a pro-European who supports the restraint of bailouts to partner countries. Upon taking office, Niinistö intended to strengthen interaction with the United States and China and maintain good relations with Russia as well as address the European debt crisis. Niinistö was re-elected in 2018 for a second six-year term. He ran as an independent but had the support of the National Coalition Party.

In 2014, Katainen stepped down as party chair and Prime Minister of Finland for a vice-presidential position in the European Commission. Katainen was replaced by Alexander Stubb as chair of the National Coalition Party in the June 2014 leadership election and thus became the prime minister. Katainen's cabinet was likewise succeeded by the Stubb Cabinet on 23 June 2014. Stubb went on to lead the party into the 2015 parliamentary election, in which the National Coalition Party placed second in votes and third in parliamentary seats. After the election, National Coalition joined a right-leaning majority coalition consisting of the three largest parties – the Centre Party, the Finns Party and the National Coalition Party. During his term, Stubb faced growing criticism for the NCP's poor poll results, the declining economy as well as compromises in the three-party government. After two years as party chair, Stubb was voted by 361 to 441 to be replaced by Petteri Orpo at the leadership election of June 2016.

After the 2019 election, it became the third-largest party in the Finnish Parliament, behind the Social Democrats and the Finns Party, and became the second-largest opposition party after being excluded from the Rinne Cabinet.

Following the 2023 general election, it became the largest party with 48 seats. As a result, its leader Petteri Orpo started forming a coalition government. The Orpo Cabinet was sworn into office on 20 June 2023, a NCP-led coalition with the Finns Party, Christian Democrats and Swedish People's Party of Finland.

In February 2024, National Coalition Party candidate Alexander Stubb was elected as Finland's next president. In the second round of the election he beat Pekka Haavisto, a green running as an independent, by 51.6 percent to 48.4 percent.

== Ideology and political position ==
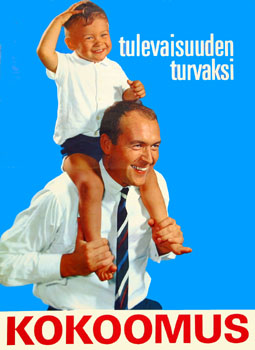
A 1964 NCP poster. With "For the security of the future", written in Finnish

Ideologically, the National Coalition Party is positioned centre-right on the political spectrum, and it has been described as conservative, liberal-conservative, conservative-liberal, and fiscally conservative.

In 2014, the non-profit The Democratic Society described it as "the heir to both liberal and conservative strains of right-of-centre thought" that is becoming increasingly liberal compared to its official stance of conservatism.

Specifically, it contains some elements of cultural and economic liberalism and social reformism. For example, it supports multiculturalism, work-based immigration, and same-sex marriage.

Despite the fact that it was previously considered to be critical of the Nordic welfare model, campaigning for strict doctrines of economic liberalism, in the 1970s the party shifted to supporting more social liberal policies, such as increased social security, which was justified by the increase of individual liberty, although, in more recent years, some have accused the party of adopting more critical views of the welfare state and of embracing more fiscally conservative positions, in addition to the abandoning of their socially liberal and green values in order to move votes away from the growing Finns Party towards themselves.

In international relations, the party advocates for multilateralism. It is pro-European and supports continued European integration within the European Union (EU). For decades, the party advocated for Finnish membership in NATO, and supported the country's accession to the alliance in 2023, despite being in opposition at the time.

== Voter base ==
Votes for NCP by municipality in the 2011 parliamentary election with urban areas gathering the most support

The magazine Suomen Kuvalehti created a profile of a typical National Coalition Party voter from over 18,000 interviews in 2011: a 36-year-old lawyer or management consultant living with a family in the Helsinki metropolitan area who supports economic liberalism, conservative values and enjoys alpine skiing and golf. Unlike other conservative parties in Europe, the party's voters come predominantly from urban areas while rural areas tend to favour the Centre Party. In 2005, the NCP had the highest proportion of female members out of the major parties. Membership in the party was momentarily on the rise in 2008, but declined from 41,000 to 34,000 by 2016. In contrast, the party had 81,000 members in 1970. According to 2008 polling data, the National Coalition Party was the most positively viewed party by Finns and was the most favoured party among the young generation in polls conducted in 2008 and 2014.

== Organization ==
=== Structure ===
The main structure of the National Coalition Party comprises municipal and local chapters organized into districts and as well as the women's, student and youth wings. The party conference (Finnish: puoluekokous), the main decision-making body convening every two years with representatives from the suborganisations as its members, elects the party chair and three deputy chairs as well as the 61-member party council (Finnish: puoluevaltuusto).

=== Leadership ===
The party chair and the deputy chairs lead the party board (Finnish: puoluehallitus), which is in charge of the daily management and is composed of a representative from each district and from each of the three wings. The party council also elects the party secretary to head the main office, located in Helsinki, and to coordinate the National Coalition Party's activities according to the board's decisions. Additionally, the NCP has separate groups for coordinating ministers, members of the Finnish Parliament, and members of the European Parliament.

=== Funding ===
Two foundations, Kansallissäätiö and Porvarillisen Työn Arkiston Säätiö, assist the party with a source of funding and as an archive, respectively. Reportedly, donations to Kansallissäätiö are kept secret, but according to the treasurer, donations are a limited asset compared to the foundation's 5 million euro investment capital. In 2008, the foundation supported NCP with €400,000. The NCP owns two companies, Kansalliskustannus Oy and Suomen Kansallismedia Oy, to publish the party newspapers Nykypäivä and Verkkouutiset as well as to handle media communications. Additionally, some thematic organizations report themselves as close to the party, such as the Swedish-language group Borgerlig samling i Finland and the queer network Kansallinen sateenkaariryhmä – Kasary.

== Election results ==
Election results are based on respective files of the Official Statistics of Finland (Finnish: Suomen virallinen tilasto) published by the national Statistics Finland institution.

=== Parliament of Finland ===
| Election | Votes | % | Seats | +/- | Government |
|---|---|---|---|---|---|
| 1919 | 155,018 | 15.70 | 28 / 200 | New | Opposition (1919–1920) |
| 1919 | 155,018 | 15.70 | 28 / 200 | New | Coalition (1920–1921) |
| 1919 | 155,018 | 15.70 | 28 / 200 | New | Opposition (1921–1922) |
| 1922 | 157,116 | 18.15 | 35 / 200 | ▲7 | Opposition |
| 1924 | 166,880 | 18.99 | 38 / 200 | ▲2 | Coalition (1924–1926) |
| 1924 | 166,880 | 18.99 | 38 / 200 | ▲2 | Opposition (1926–1927) |
| 1927 | 161,450 | 17.74 | 34 / 200 | ▼4 | Opposition |
| 1929 | 138,008 | 14.51 | 28 / 200 | ▼6 | Opposition |
| 1930 | 203,958 | 18.05 | 42 / 200 | ▲14 | Coalition (1930–1932) |
| 1930 | 203,958 | 18.05 | 42 / 200 | ▲14 | Opposition (1932–1933) |
| 1933 | 187,527 | 16.93 | 32 / 200 | ▼10 | Opposition |
| 1936 | 121,619 | 10.36 | 20 / 200 | ▼12 | Opposition |
| 1939 | 176,215 | 13.58 | 25 / 200 | ▲5 | Coalition (1939–1944) |
| 1939 | 176,215 | 13.58 | 25 / 200 | ▲5 | Opposition (1944–1945) |
| 1945 | 255,394 | 15.04 | 28 / 200 | ▲3 | Opposition |
| 1948 | 320,366 | 17.04 | 33 / 200 | ▲5 | Opposition |
| 1951 | 264,044 | 14.57 | 28 / 200 | ▼5 | Opposition |
| 1954 | 257,025 | 12.80 | 24 / 200 | ▼4 | Opposition |
| 1958 | 297,094 | 15.28 | 29 / 200 | ▲5 | Coalition (1958–1959) |
| 1958 | 297,094 | 15.28 | 29 / 200 | ▲5 | Opposition (1959–1962) |
| 1962 | 346,638 | 15.06 | 32 / 200 | ▲3 | Coalition |
| 1966 | 326,928 | 13.79 | 26 / 200 | ▼6 | Opposition |
| 1970 | 457,582 | 18.05 | 37 / 200 | ▲11 | Opposition |
| 1972 | 453,434 | 17.59 | 34 / 200 | ▼3 | Opposition |
| 1975 | 505,145 | 18.37 | 35 / 200 | ▲1 | Opposition |
| 1979 | 626,764 | 21.65 | 47 / 200 | ▲12 | Opposition |
| 1983 | 659,078 | 22.12 | 44 / 200 | ▼3 | Opposition |
| 1987 | 666,236 | 23.13 | 53 / 200 | ▲9 | Coalition |
| 1991 | 526,487 | 19.31 | 40 / 200 | ▼13 | Coalition |
| 1995 | 497,624 | 17.89 | 39 / 200 | ▼1 | Coalition |
| 1999 | 563,835 | 21.03 | 46 / 200 | ▲7 | Coalition |
| 2003 | 517,904 | 18.55 | 40 / 200 | ▼6 | Opposition |
| 2007 | 616,841 | 22.26 | 50 / 200 | ▲10 | Coalition |
| 2011 | 598,369 | 20.44 | 44 / 200 | ▼6 | Coalition |
| 2015 | 540,212 | 18.20 | 37 / 200 | ▼7 | Coalition |
| 2019 | 523,957 | 17.00 | 38 / 200 | ▲1 | Opposition |
| 2023 | 644,555 | 20.82 | 48 / 200 | ▲10 | Coalition |

=== European Parliament ===
| Election | Votes | % | Seats | +/– | EP Group |
|---|---|---|---|---|---|
| 1996 | 453,729 | 20.17 (#3) | 4 / 16 | New | EPP |
| 1999 | 313,960 | 25.27 (#1) | 4 / 16 | 0 | EPP-ED |
| 2004 | 392,771 | 23.71 (#1) | 4 / 14 | 0 | EPP-ED |
| 2009 | 386,416 | 23.21 (#1) | 3 / 13 | ▼1 | EPP |
| 2014 | 390,112 | 22.59 (#1) | 3 / 13 | 0 | EPP |
| 2019 | 380,106 | 20.79 (#1) | 3 / 13 | 0 | EPP |
| 2024 | 453,636 | 24.80 (#1) | 4 / 15 | ▲1 | EPP |

=== Municipal ===
| Election | Councillors | Votes | % |
|---|---|---|---|
| 1950 | | 88,159 | 5.85 |
| 1953 | | 133,626 | 7.59 |
| 1956 | | 105,220 | 6.29 |
| 1960 | | 275,560 | 14.04 |
| 1964 | | 213,378 | 10.0 |
| 1968 | 1,388 | 364,428 | 16.09 |
| 1972 | 1,503 | 451,484 | 18.06 |
| 1976 | 2,047 | 561,121 | 20.92 |
| 1980 | 2,373 | 628,950 | 22.94 |
| 1984 | 2,423 | 619,264 | 22.96 |
| 1988 | 2,392 | 601,468 | 22.87 |
| 1992 | 2,009 | 507,574 | 19.05 |
| 1996 | 2,167 | 514,313 | 21.64 |
| 2000 | 2,028 | 463,493 | 20.84 |
| 2004 | 2,078 | 521,412 | 21.83 |
| 2008 | 2,020 | 597,727 | 23.45 |
| 2012 | 1,735 | 544,682 | 21.9 |
| 2017 | 1,490 | 531,599 | 20.68 |
| 2021 | 1,552 | 522,623 | 21.4 |
| 2025 | 1,592 | 529,542 | 21.9 |

=== Presidential ===
==== Indirect elections ====
Electoral college
| Election | Candidate | Popular vote | | | First ballot | | Second ballot | | Third ballot | | Results |
| Election | Candidate | Votes | % | Seats | Votes | % | Votes | % | Votes | % | Results |
| 1919 | | | | | | | | | | | |
| 1925 | Hugo Suolahti | 141,240 | 22.7 | 68 / 300 | 68 / 300 | 22.7 (#3) | 80 / 300 | 26.7 (#3) | | | Lost |
| 1931 | Pehr Evind Svinhufvud | 180,378 | 21.6 | 64 / 300 | 88 / 300 | 29.3 (#2) | 98 / 300 | 17.7 (#2) | 151 / 300 | 50.3 (#1) | Won |
| 1937 | Pehr Evind Svinhufvud | 240,602 | 21.6 | 63 / 300 | 94 / 300 | 31.3 (#2) | 104 / 300 | 34.7 (#2) | | | Lost |
| 1940 | Pehr Evind Svinhufvud | | | | 1 / 300 | 0.3 (#4) | | | | | Lost |
| 1943 | Väinö Kotilainen | | | | 4 / 300 | 1.3 (#2) | | | | | Lost |
| 1946 (Note: The 1946 presidential election was done by Parliament rather than an electoral college.) | Juho Kusti Paasikivi | | | | 159 / 200 | 79.5 (#1) | | | | | Won |
| 1950 | Juho Kusti Paasikivi | 360,789 | 22.9 | 68 / 300 | 171 / 300 | 57.0 (#1) | | | | | Won |
| 1956 | Juho Kusti Paasikivi | 340,311 | 17.9 | 54 / 300 | | | 84 / 300 | 28.0 (#3) | | | Lost |
| 1962 | | 288,912 | 13.1 | 37 / 300 | | | | | | | |
| 1968 | Matti Virkkunen | 432,014 | 21.2 | 58 / 300 | 66 / 300 | 22.0 (#2) | | | | | Lost |
| 1978 | Urho Kekkonen | 360,310 | 14.7 | 45 / 300 | 259 / 300 | 86.3 (#1) | | | | | Won |
| 1982 | Harri Holkeri | 593,271 | 18.7 | 58 / 300 | 58 / 300 | 19.3 (#2) | 58 / 300 | 19.3 (#2) | | | Lost |
| 1988 (Note: The 1988 presidential election was partially indirect. With no candidate achieving a majority of the popular vote, the president was elected by the electoral college which the voters voted for alongside the direct vote.) | Harri Holkeri | 603,180 | 20.2 | 63 / 300 | 63 / 300 | 21.0 (#3) | 18 / 300 | 6.0 (#4) | | | Lost |

==== Direct elections ====
| Election | Candidate | 1st round | | 2nd round | | Result |
| Election | Candidate | Votes | % | Votes | % | Result |
|---|---|---|---|---|---|---|
| 1988 | Harri Holkeri | 570,340 | 18.4 | —N/a | | Lost |
| 1994 | Raimo Ilaskivi | 485,035 | 15.2 | | | Lost |
| 2000 | Riitta Uosukainen | 392,305 | 12.8 | | | Lost |
| 2006 | Sauli Niinistö | 725,866 | 24.1 | 1,518,333 | 48.2 | Lost |
| 2012 | Sauli Niinistö | 1,131,254 | 37.0 | 1,802,400 | 62.6 | Won |
| 2018 | Supported Sauli Niinistö | 1,874,334 | 62.6 | | | Won |
| 2024 | Alexander Stubb | 882,113 | 27.21 | 1,575,211 | 51.62 | Won |

== The elected Presidents of Finland of the National Coalition Party ==
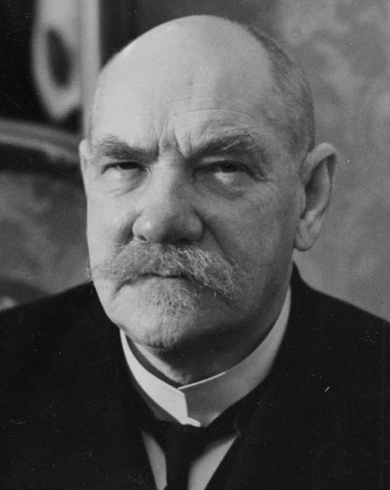
P.E. Svinhufvud

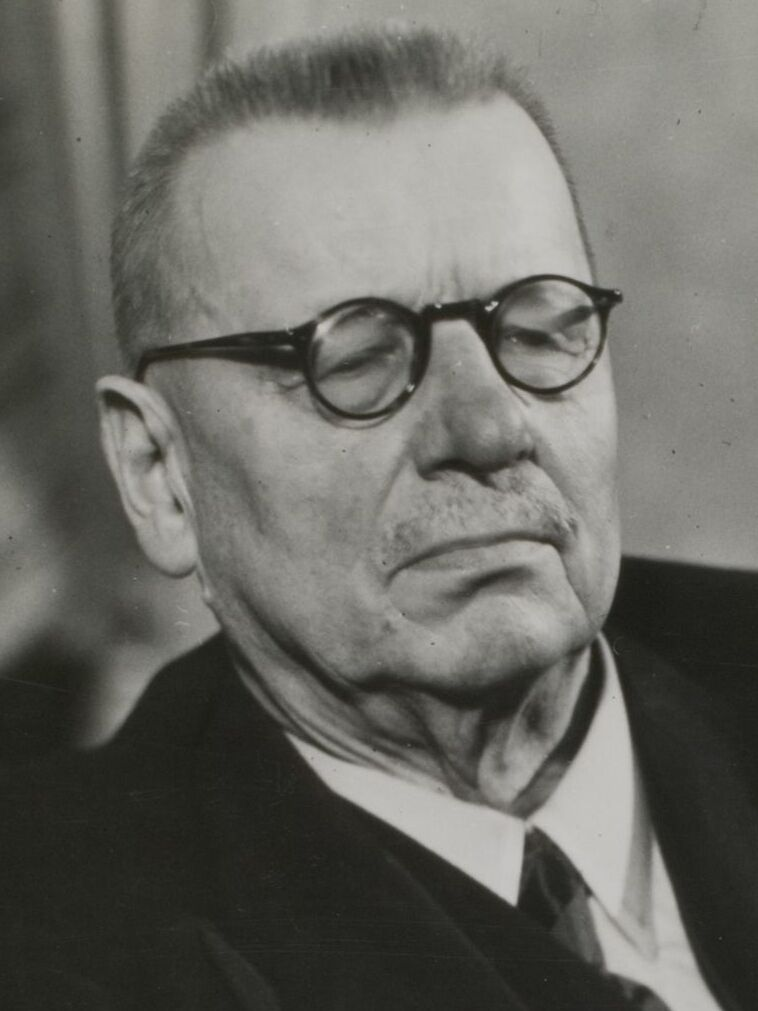
J.K. Paasikivi

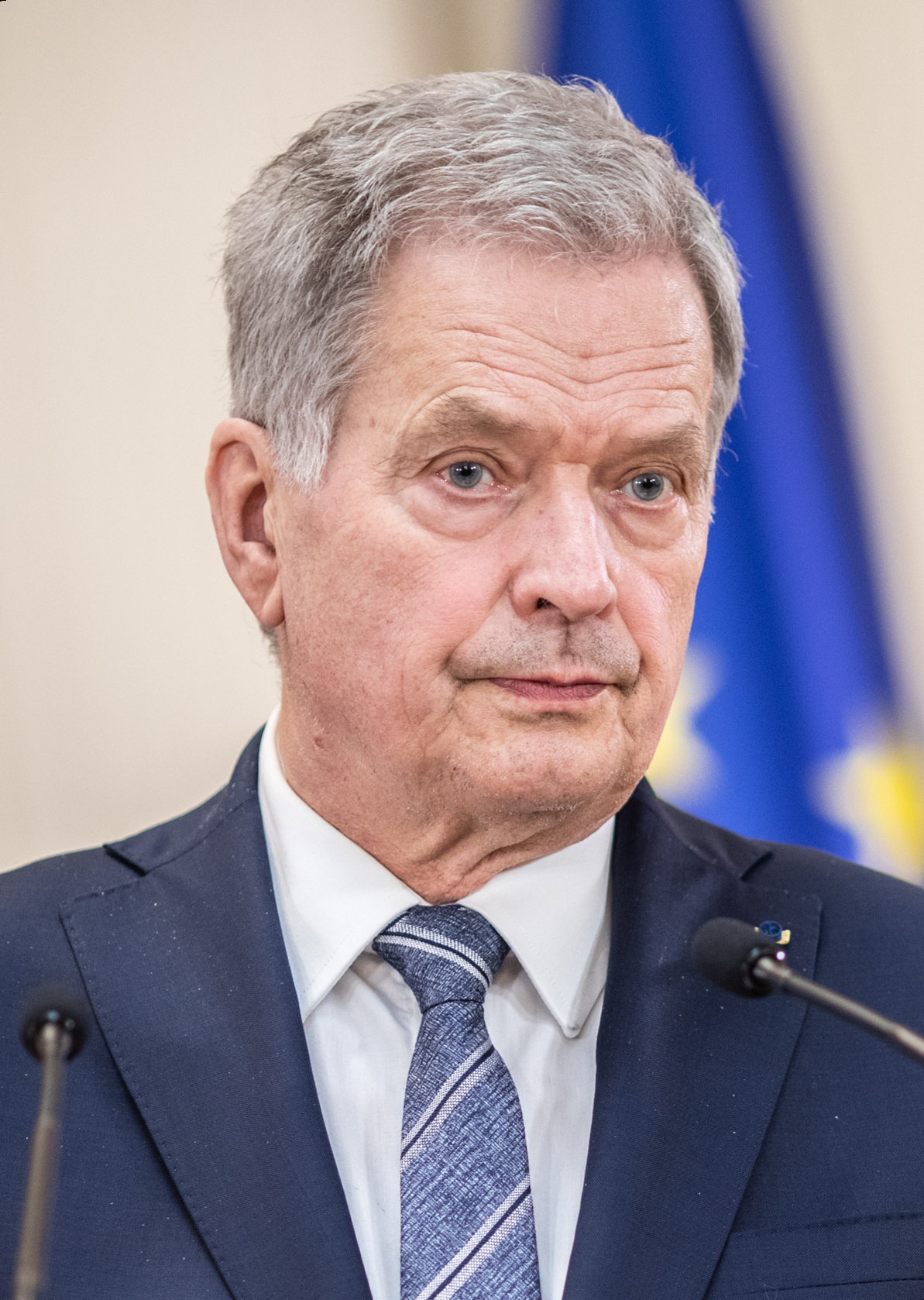
Sauli Niinistö

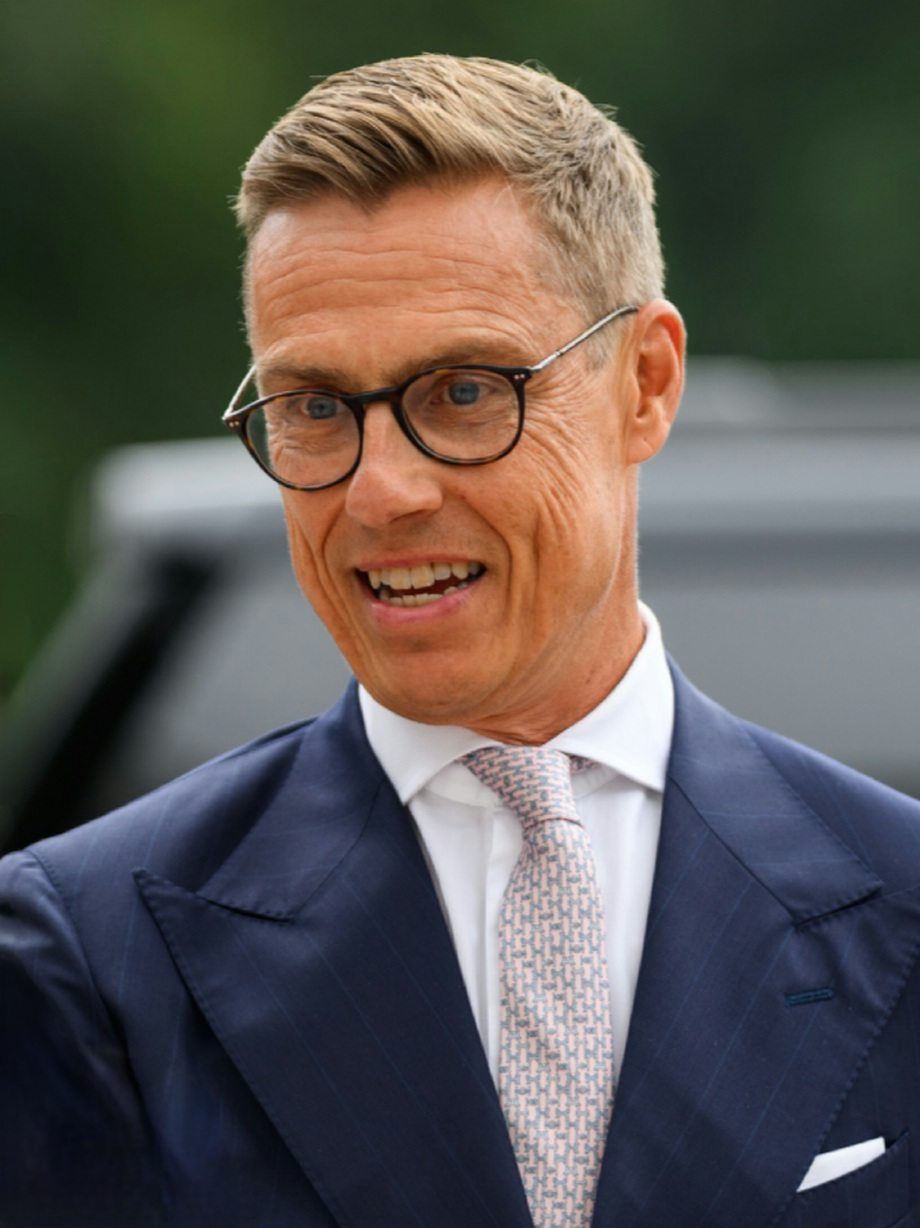
Alexander Stubb

== Prominent party leaders ==
The following NCP members have held high offices:

- Lauri Ingman – Prime Minister (1918–1919, 1924–1925)
- Antti Tulenheimo – Prime Minister (1925)
- Pehr Evind Svinhufvud – President (1931–1937)
- Edwin Linkomies – Prime Minister (1943–1944)
- Juho Kusti Paasikivi – President (1946–1956), Prime Minister (1944–1946)
- Harri Holkeri – Prime Minister (1987–1991)
- Riitta Uosukainen – Minister of Education (1991–1994), Speaker of the Parliament (1994–2003)
- Sauli Niinistö – Minister of Finance (1995–2003), Speaker of the Parliament (2007–2011), President (2012–2024)
- Jyrki Katainen – Minister of Finance (2007–2011), Prime Minister (2011–2014), vice president of the European Commission (2014–2019)
- Alexander Stubb – Prime Minister (2014–2015), Minister of Finance (2015–2016), President of Finland (2024–present)
- Petteri Orpo – Minister of Finance (2016–2019), Speaker of the Parliament (2023–2023), Prime Minister (2023–present)

== See also ==
- Constitution of Finland
- Foreign relations of Finland
- Petteri Orpo – current party chairperson and Prime Minister of Finland
- Moderate Party – similar party in Sweden
