= Speaker of the Parliament of Finland =

Legislative chair of the government of Finland

Speaker of Parliament of Republic of Finland
- Eduskunnan puhemies Riksdagens talman
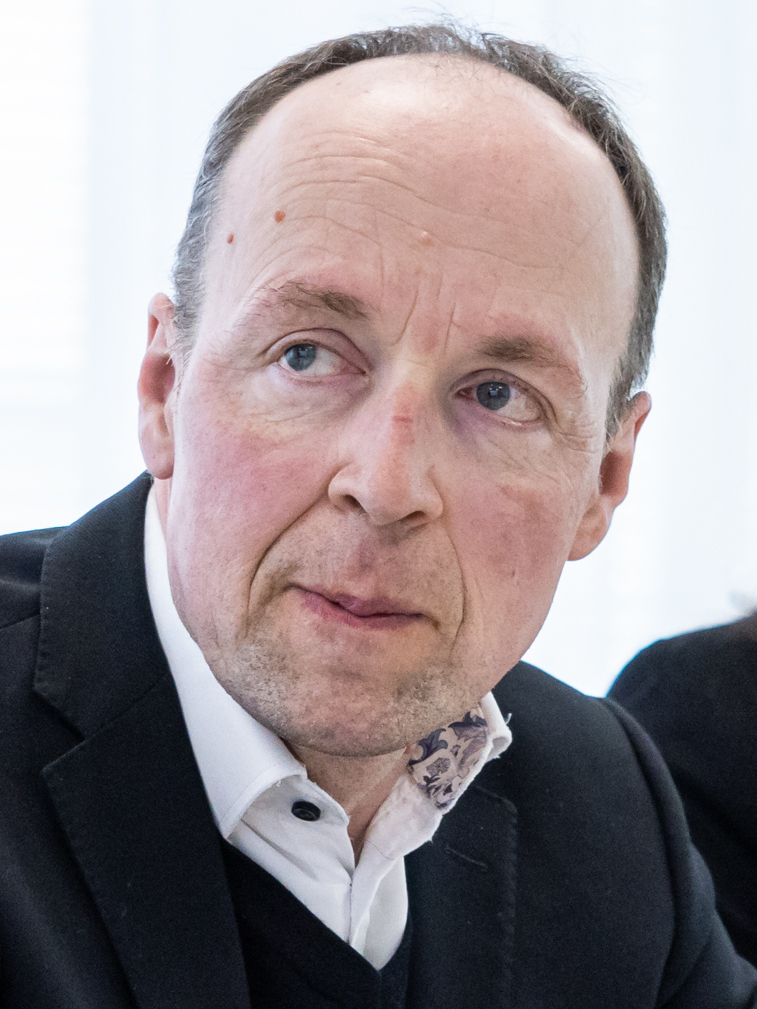
- Incumbent; Jussi Halla-aho since 21 June 2023
- Parliament of Finland
- Seat: Helsinki, Finland
- Appointer: Parliament
- Term length: One year
- Constituting instrument: Constitution of Finland
- Precursor: Speaker of the Diet of Finland
- Formation: 1907; 119 years ago
- First holder: Pehr Evind Svinhufvud
- Salary: €13,390 monthly
- Website: www.eduskunta.fi

The speaker of the Parliament of Finland (Finnish eduskunnan puhemies, Swedish riksdagens talman), along with two deputy speakers, is elected by Parliament during the first plenary session each year. Speakers are chosen for a year at a time. In addition to their preparing the work in plenary sessions the speakers also play a key role in Parliament's international co-operation, which includes visits by speakers and international delegations as well as participation in numerous interparliamentary organisations.

The speaker and two deputy speakers are elected by parliament from among its members by secret ballot. After the election the speaker and deputy speakers each make the following solemn affirmation before Parliament:

"I, ..., affirm that in my office as speaker I will to the best of my ability defend the rights of the people, parliament and the government of Finland according to the Constitution."

Formally, the speaker ranks second in the protocol, after the president of Finland and before the prime minister of Finland. The speaker is the chairman of the parliament, who grants the floor for speeches and replies, makes voting proposals and decides on the final order of business. An interim speaker is elected for the duration of government formation talks. The speaker's duties are defined in the Constitution of Finland and the parliament's rules of procedure.

The title puhemies or talman has, both in Finnish and Swedish, the literal meaning 'spokesman', which has caused mild controversies in terms of sexism in language. However, according to official language authorities, the title is not easy to change to a more gender-neutral alternative due to its "strong connection to the institution and history of the Parliament".

If there is a tie in the Speaker's Council the speaker is given a tie-breaking vote.

== Political conventions ==
=== Election conventions ===
The speaker as well as deputy speakers are elected in a secret ballot vote where they must receive a majority of the vote. By convention the position of speaker is held by a senior member of parliament from the second largest party in government. The position of first deputy speaker traditionally goes to a senior parliamentarian from the largest party in government. The role of second deputy speaker traditionally belongs to a member of the largest party in parliament that did not receive the speakership or first deputy speakership.

This convention usually manifests in elections to the position with lobsided majorities, but sometimes the results are tighter. As an example in 2024 the current speaker, Jussi Halla-Aho, was elected with a reduced majority as a political protest. A record low result was reached in 2011 by then speaker Sauli Niinistö when he was re-elected with just 89 votes. As a result he expressed intent to resign, but did not in the end do so after consultation with the parliamentary groups

=== Convention of neutrality ===
The role of the speaker and to a lesser degree deputy speakers in political matters differs from other members of parliament. The speaker is through many ways, though not by law, bound to carrying out his or her office act with neutrality. To reinforce this convention the speaker and deputy speakers have no vote in parliament when preciding over it, may not speak in plenary sessions when preciding over it, and are not members of sany legislative committees. Instead the role of the speaker is to represent and lead the institution of parliament. This role of representing parliament also demands neutrality on issues of partisan politics, though the rule is lesser for deputy speakers. This broad convention of neutrality also affords statements from the speaker a great deal of weight in their domain rivaled only by the president. It also means the speaker is not generally seen as a political actor.

== List of speakers of the Parliament of Finland ==
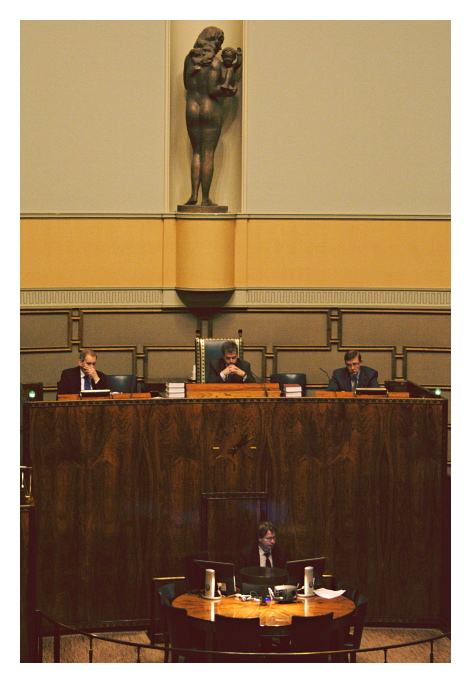
Desk of the speaker of the Parliament of Finland

No.	Portrait	Name (Birth–Death)	Term of office		Party
No.	Portrait	Name (Birth–Death)	Took office	Left office	Party
1		Pehr Evind Svinhufvud (1861–1944)	23 May 1907	31 January 1913	Young Finnish
2		Oskari Tokoi (1873–1963)	3 February 1913	1 February 1914	Social Democratic
3		Kaarlo Juho Ståhlberg (1865–1952)	3 February 1914	3 April 1917	Young Finnish
4		Kullervo Manner (1880–1939)	4 April 1917	30 October 1917	Social Democratic
5		Johannes Lundson (1867–1939)	2 November 1917	25 September 1918	Young Finnish
6		Lauri Ingman (1868–1934)	27 September 1918	4 November 1918	Finnish
7		Ernst Nevanlinna (1873–1932)	6 November 1918	11 November 1918	Finnish
(6)		Lauri Ingman (1868–1934)	13 November 1918	28 November 1918	Finnish
8		Paavo Virkkunen (1874–1959)	29 November 1918	31 March 1919	Finnish
9		Lauri Kristian Relander (1883–1942)	2 April 1919	8 May 1920	Agrarian
10		Kyösti Kallio (1873–1940)	8 May 1920	29 March 1921	Agrarian
11		Wäinö Wuolijoki (1872–1947)	31 March 1921	4 September 1922	Social Democratic
(10)		Kyösti Kallio (1873–1940)	6 September 1922	14 November 1922	Agrarian
(11)		Wäinö Wuolijoki (1872–1947)	15 November 1922	31 January 1923	Social Democratic
(8)		Paavo Virkkunen (1874–1959)	2 February 1923	30 April 1924	National Coalition
(10)		Kyösti Kallio (1873–1940)	2 May 1924	31 March 1925	Agrarian
(11)		Wäinö Wuolijoki (1872–1947)	1 April 1925	31 January 1926	Social Democratic
(8)		Paavo Virkkunen (1874–1959)	2 February 1926	1 September 1927	National Coalition
(10)		Kyösti Kallio (1873–1940)	3 September 1927	31 January 1928	Agrarian
(8)		Paavo Virkkunen (1874–1959)	1 February 1928	31 January 1929	National Coalition
(10)		Kyösti Kallio (1873–1940)	1 February 1929	16 August 1929	Agrarian
(8)		Paavo Virkkunen (1874–1959)	17 August 1929	7 July 1930	National Coalition
12		Juho Sunila (1875–1936)	8 July 1930	20 October 1930	Agrarian
(10)		Kyösti Kallio (1873–1940)	21 October 1930	8 October 1936	Agrarian
13		Väinö Hakkila (1882–1958)	9 October 1936	4 April 1945	Social Democratic
14		Karl-August Fagerholm (1901–1984)	6 April 1945	14 July 1948	Social Democratic
15		Urho Kekkonen (1900–1986)	22 July 1948	21 March 1950	Agrarian
(14)		Karl-August Fagerholm (1901–1984)	23 March 1950	6 March 1956	Social Democratic
16		V. J. Sukselainen (1906–1995)	9 March 1956	28 May 1957	Agrarian
(14)		Karl-August Fagerholm (1901–1984)	31 May 1957	6 June 1958	Social Democratic
(16)		V. J. Sukselainen (1906–1995)	29 July 1958	14 January 1959	Agrarian
(14)		Karl-August Fagerholm (1901–1984)	14 January 1959	16 February 1962	Social Democratic
17		Kauno Kleemola (1906–1965)	24 February 1962	12 March 1965	Agrarian (until 1965)
17		Kauno Kleemola (1906–1965)	24 February 1962	12 March 1965	Centre (from 1965)
(14)		Karl-August Fagerholm (1901–1984)	23 March 1965	4 April 1966	Social Democratic
18		Rafael Paasio (1903–1980)	14 April 1966	1 June 1966	Social Democratic
19		Johannes Virolainen (1914–2000)	3 June 1966	26 March 1968	Centre
(16)		V. J. Sukselainen (1906–1995)	26 March 1968	20 March 1970	Centre
(18)		Rafael Paasio (1903–1980)	3 April 1970	29 February 1972	Social Democratic
(16)		V. J. Sukselainen (1906–1995)	29 February 1972	28 January 1976	Centre
20		Veikko Helle (1911–2005)	5 February 1976	31 January 1978	Social Democratic
21		Ahti Pekkala (1924–2014)	1 February 1978	29 May 1979	Centre
(19)		Johannes Virolainen (1914–2000)	5 June 1979	25 March 1983	Centre
22		Erkki Pystynen (1929–2026)	7 April 1983	25 March 1987	National Coalition
23	Ilkka Suominen (2009)	Ilkka Suominen (1939–2022)	2 April 1987	5 May 1987	National Coalition
24		Matti Ahde (1945–2019)	8 May 1987	1 February 1989	Social Democratic
25		Kalevi Sorsa (1930–2004)	1 February 1989	21 March 1991	Social Democratic
26		Esko Aho (born 1954)	4 April 1991	26 April 1991	Centre
(23)	Ilkka Suominen (2009)	Ilkka Suominen (1939–2022)	30 April 1991	6 February 1994	National Coalition
27		Riitta Uosukainen (born 1942)	7 February 1994	23 March 1995	National Coalition
28		Paavo Lipponen (born 1941)	28 March 1995	19 April 1995	Social Democratic
(27)		Riitta Uosukainen (born 1942)	21 April 1995	23 March 1999	National Coalition
29		Jukka Mikkola (1943–2018)	30 March 1999	16 April 1999	Social Democratic
(27)		Riitta Uosukainen (born 1942)	20 April 1999	18 March 2003	National Coalition
30		Anneli Jäätteenmäki (born 1955)	25 March 2003	16 April 2003	Centre
(28)		Paavo Lipponen (born 1941)	22 April 2003	20 March 2007	Social Democratic
31		Timo Kalli (born 1947)	27 March 2007	20 April 2007	Centre
32		Sauli Niinistö (born 1948)	24 April 2007	19 April 2011	National Coalition
33		Ben Zyskowicz (born 1954)	27 April 2011	22 June 2011	National Coalition
34		Eero Heinäluoma (born 1955)	23 June 2011	21 April 2015	Social Democratic
35		Juha Sipilä (born 1961)	28 April 2015	29 May 2015	Centre
36		Maria Lohela (born 1978)	29 May 2015	5 February 2018	Finns (until 2017)
36		Maria Lohela (born 1978)	29 May 2015	5 February 2018	Blue Reform (from 2017)
37		Paula Risikko (born 1960)	5 February 2018	16 April 2019	National Coalition
38		Antti Rinne (born 1962)	24 April 2019	5 June 2019	Social Democratic
39		Matti Vanhanen (born 1955)	7 June 2019	9 June 2020	Centre
40		Anu Vehviläinen (born 1963)	9 June 2020	1 February 2022	Centre
(39)		Matti Vanhanen (born 1955)	1 February 2022	4 April 2023	Centre
41		Petteri Orpo (born 1969)	12 April 2023	20 June 2023	National Coalition
42		Jussi Halla-aho (born 1971)	21 June 2023	Incumbent	Finns

== List of deputy speakers ==
=== First deputy speakers ===
Speaker	Term in office	Party
Nils Robert af Ursin	1907–1908	SDP
Yrjö Sirola	1908–1909	SDP
Akseli Listo	1909	Finnish Party
Yrjö Sirola	1909–1910	SDP
Väinö Tanner	1910	SDP
Karl Söderholm	1910–1911	SPP
Oskari Tokoi	1911–1913	SDP
Lauri Ingman	1913–1914	Finnish Party
Oskari Tokoi	1914–1917	SDP
Lauri Ingman	1917–1918	Finnish Party
Pekka Ahmavaara	1918	Young Finns
Santeri Alkio	1918–1919	Agrarian League
Anton Kotonen	1919–1921	SDP
Oskari Mantere	1921–1922	NPP
Wäinö Wuolijoki	1922–1923	SDP
Paavo Virkkunen	1924–1925	NCP
Jalo Lahdensuo	1925–1928	Agrarian League
Rieti Itkonen	1928–1929	SDP
Väinö Hakkila	1929–1930	SDP
Antti Tulenheimo	1930–1932	NCP
Väinö Hakkila	1932–1936	SDP
Juho Koivisto	1936–1937	Agrarian League
Jalo Lahdensuo	1937–1938	Agrarian League
Viljami Kalliokoski	1938–1940	Agrarian League
Mikko Tarkkanen	1940–1945	Agrarian League
Cay Sundström	1945	SKDL
Eino Pekkala	1945–1946	SKDL
Toivo Kujala	1946	SKDL
Lennart Heljas	1946–1947	Agrarian League
Urho Kekkonen	1947–1948	Agrarian League
Alpo Lumme	1948–1949	SDP
Penna Tervo	1949–1950	Agrarian League
Viljami Kalliokoski	1950–1953	Agrarian League
Lennart Heljas	1954–1956	Agrarian League
Väinö Leskinen	1956–1957	SDP
Lennart Heljas	1957–1958	Agrarian League
Toivo Kujala	1958–1959	SKDL
Paavo Aitio	1959–1966	SKDL
Wiljam Sarjala	1966	Centre Party
Veikko Kokkola	1966–1970	SDP
Nestori Kaasalainen	1970–1971	Centre Party
Johannes Virolainen	1971–1972	Centre Party
Esko Niskanen	1972	SDP
Veikko Helle	1972–1976	SDP
Ahti Pekkala	1976–1978	Centre Party
Veikko Helle	1978–1983	SDP
Pirkko Työläjärvi	1983–1985	SDP
Matti Louekoski	1985–1987	SDP
Elsi Hetemäki-Olander	1987–1991	NCP
Saara-Maria Paakkinen	1991–1995	SDP
Sirkka-Liisa Anttila	1995–1996	Centre Party
Mikko Pesälä	1996–1999	Centre Party
Sirkka-Liisa Anttila	1999–2003	Centre Party
Liisa Jaakonsaari	2003	SDP
Seppo Kääriäinen	2003	Centre Party
Markku Koski	2003–2006	Centre Party
Sirkka-Liisa Anttila	2006–2007	Centre Party
Ilkka Kanerva	2007	NCP
Seppo Kääriäinen	2007–2011	Centre Party
Jutta Urpilainen	2011	SDP
Pekka Ravi	2011–2015	NCP
Timo Soini	2015	Finns Party
Mauri Pekkarinen	2015–2019	Centre Party
Juho Eerola	2019	Finns Party
Tuula Haatainen	2019	SDP
Antti Rinne	2019–2020	SDP
Tarja Filatov	2020–2021	SDP
Antti Rinne	2021–2023	SDP
Juho Eerola	2023	Finns Party
Paula Risikko	2023–	NCP

=== Second deputy speakers ===
Speaker	Term in office	Party
Ernst Palmén	1907–1908	Finnish Party
Akseli Listo	1908–1909	Finnish Party
Karl Söderholm	1909	SPP
Akseli Listo	1909–1910	Finnish Party
Karl Söderholm	1910	SPP
Akseli Listo	1910–1913	Finnish Party
Karl Söderholm	1913	SPP
Emil Schybergson	1913–1914	SPP
Lauri Ingman	1914–1917	Finnish Party
Väinö Jokinen	1917	SDP
Santeri Alkio	1917–1918	Agrarian League
Emil Schybergson	1918	SPP
Pekka Ahmavaara	1918–1919	NCP
Paavo Virkkunen	1919–1921	NCP
Eero Hatva	1922	Agrarian League
Oskar Mantere	1922	NPP
Jalo Lahdensuo	1923–1924	Agrarian League
Wäinö Wuolijoki	1924–1925	SDP
Paavo Virkkunen	1925	NCP
Jalo Lahdensuo	1926	Agrarian League
Jaakko Keto	1926–1927	SDP
Rieti Itkonen	1927–1928	SDP
Ragnar Furuhjelm	1928–1929	SPP
Paavo Virkkunen	1929	NCP
Juho Sunila	1929–1930	Agrarian League
Gunnar Sahlstein	1930	NCP
Väinö Hakkila	1930–1933	SDP
Ernst von Born	1933–1939	SPP
Edwin Linkomies	1939–1943	NCP
Toivo Horelli	1943–1945	NCP
Vihtori Vesterinen	1945	Agrarian League
Lennart Heljas	1945–1946	Agrarian League
Toivo Kujala	1947–1958	SKDL
Onni Peltonen	1958	SDP
Johannes Virolainen	1959–1961	Agrarian League
Kusti Eskola	1961–1962	Agrarian League
Jussi Saukkonen	1962–1964	NCP
Niilo Kosola	1964–1966	NCP
Paavo Aitio	1966–1968	SKDL
Leo Suonpää	1968–1970	SKDL
Olavi Lähteenmäki	1970–1975	NCP
Anna-Liisa Linkola	1975–1979	NCP
Juuso Häikiö	1979–1983	NCP
Veikko Pihlajamäki	1983	Centre Party
Mikko Pesälä	1983–1991	Centre Party
Ritva Laurila	1991	NCP
Mikko Pesälä	1991–1994	Centre Party
Seppo Pelttari	1994	Centre Party
Riitta Uosukainen	1995	NCP
Matti Louekoski	1995–1996	SDP
Kerttu Törnqvist	1996–1999	SDP
Riitta Uosukainen	1999	NCP
Jukka Mikkola	1999–2003	SDP
Ilkka Kanerva	2003–2007	NCP
Johannes Koskinen	2007–2010	SDP
Tarja Filatov	2010–2011	SDP
Anssi Joutsenlahti	2011–2015	Finns Party
Ben Zyskowicz	2015	NCP
Paula Risikko	2015–2016	NCP
Arto Satonen	2016–2018	NCP
Tuula Haatainen	2018–2019	SDP
Paula Risikko	2019	NCP
Juho Eerola	2019–2023	Finns Party
Tarja Filatov	2023–	SDP

== See also ==
- Parliament of Finland
- Diet of Finland
- Lantmarskalks of the Finnish House of Nobility
