= Häikiö =

Häikiö is a Finnish surname. Notable people with the surname include:

- Juuso Häikiö (1917–2003), Finnish jurist, military officer, and politician
- Martti Häikiö (1949–2025), Finnish historian and writer
