= Kyösti Kallio =

Finnish politician (1873–1940)

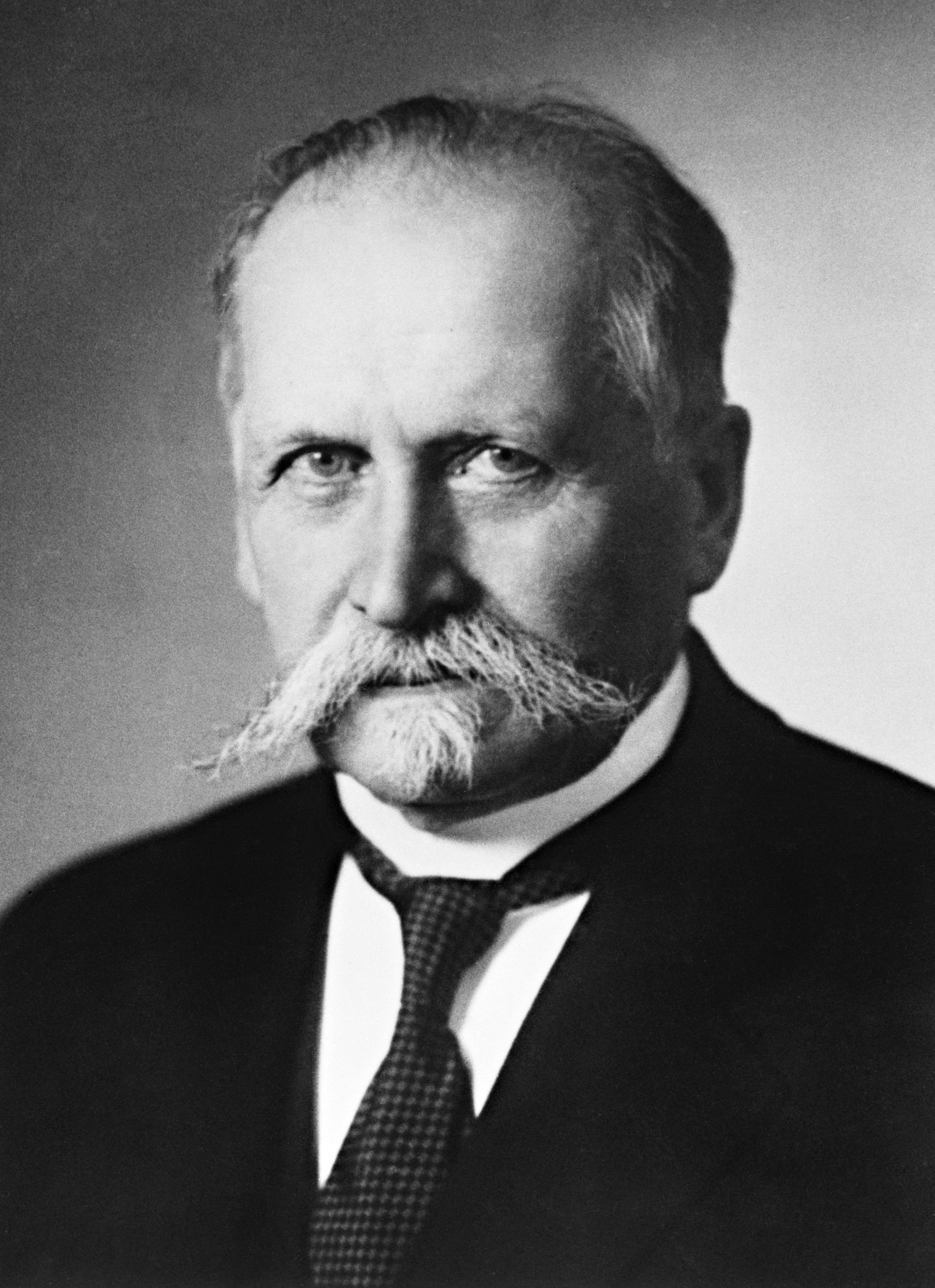
- Kallio in 1937

4th President of Finland
- In office 1 March 1937 – 19 December 1940
- Prime Minister: Aimo Cajander; Risto Ryti
- Preceded by: Pehr Evind Svinhufvud
- Succeeded by: Risto Ryti

8th Prime Minister of Finland
- In office 7 October 1936 – 15 February 1937
- President: Pehr Evind Svinhufvud
- Preceded by: Toivo Mikael Kivimäki
- Succeeded by: Aimo Cajander
- In office 16 August 1929 – 4 July 1930
- President: Lauri Kristian Relander
- Preceded by: Oskari Mantere
- Succeeded by: Pehr Evind Svinhufvud
- In office 31 December 1925 – 13 December 1926
- President: Lauri Kristian Relander
- Preceded by: Antti Tulenheimo
- Succeeded by: Väinö Tanner
- In office 14 November 1922 – 18 January 1924
- President: Kaarlo Juho Ståhlberg
- Preceded by: Aimo Cajander
- Succeeded by: Aimo Cajander

Speaker of the Parliament of Finland
- In office 21 October 1930 – 8 October 1936
- Preceded by: Juho Sunila
- Succeeded by: Väinö Hakkila
- In office 1 February 1929 – 16 August 1929
- Preceded by: Paavo Virkkunen
- Succeeded by: Paavo Virkkunen
- In office 3 September 1927 – 31 January 1928
- Preceded by: Paavo Virkkunen
- Succeeded by: Paavo Virkkunen
- In office 2 May 1924 – 31 March 1925
- Preceded by: Paavo Virkkunen
- Succeeded by: Wäinö Wuolijoki
- In office 6 September 1922 – 14 November 1922
- Preceded by: Wäinö Wuolijoki
- Succeeded by: Wäinö Wuolijoki
- In office 8 May 1920 – 29 March 1921
- Preceded by: Lauri Kristian Relander
- Succeeded by: Wäinö Wuolijoki

Personal details
- Born: Gustaf Kalliokangas; 10 April 1873 Ylivieska, Grand Duchy of Finland
- Died: 19 December 1940 (aged 67) Helsinki, Finland
- Resting place: Nivala Cemetery
- Party: Agrarian
- Spouse: Kaisa Nivala
- Children: 6
- Occupation: Farmer; Bank clerk
- Kyösti Kallio's voice On Finland's 22nd Independence day Recorded December 6, 1939

Kyösti Kallio (Finnish pronunciation: [ˈkyø̯sti ˈkɑlːio], 10 April 1873 – 19 December 1940) was a Finnish politician who served as the president of Finland from 1937 to 1940. His presidency included leading the country through the Winter War; while he relinquished the post of commander-in-chief to Carl Gustaf Emil Mannerheim, he played a role as a spiritual leader. After the war, he became both the first president of Finland to resign and the only one to die in office, dying of a heart attack while returning home after submitting his resignation.

Before his career in state-wide politics, Kallio was a landowner and a local politician at his home in Nivala. He attended the Diet of Finland since 1904 and was a candidate at the 1907 Finnish parliamentary election, where he was elected as a representative of the Young Finnish Party. In the next year, he changed his party to the Agrarian League, where he rose to a leadership position along with Santeri Alkio.

Kallio was the only president of Finland who did not have an academic or similar degree. He was a prominent leader of the Agrarian League party, and served as Prime Minister four times and Speaker of the Parliament six times. During his political career, he also served as a five-time Minister of Agriculture for most of the period between 1917 and 1922, including in the Independence Senate and the Civil War-era White cabinet, led a 1922 land reform to aid tenant farmers in acquiring their own land, and was a candidate in the 1931 presidential election before defeating incumbent president Pehr Evind Svinhufvud in the subsequent elections of 1937.

== Biography ==
=== Early life ===
Mikko Kalliokangas, the father of Kyösti Kallio. Photograph taken at an unknown time.

Kyösti Kallio, originally Gustaf Kalliokangas (forename Finland Swedish pronunciation: [ˈɡʉstɑːf], surname Finnish pronunciation: [ˈkɑlːioˌkɑŋːɑs]), was born in Ylivieska, Grand Duchy of Finland, which was an autonomous region of the Russian Empire at the time. His father Mikko Kalliokangas (formerly Kontio; 1843–1908) was a farmer and prominent local politician in Ylivieska. Kyösti Kallio was a vivid and active child, and he started accompanying his father and his farmhands at the stable, at the fields and in the forest.

Young Kyösti's life also included his father's unmarried and childless cousin, Anttuuna Kangas, or aunt Anttuuna, who arranged for the boy to go to Raahe's junior high school in 1886. After that, he was educated in Oulu where he became acquainted with Santeri Alkio, author and future ideologue of the Agrarian League.

In 1894 Kyösti Kallio became the master of the co-operative farming houses of Neikkilä and Mehtälä in Nivala. During the first years, the lady of the house was Anttuuna Kangas. During a period of almost ten years, Kallio bought new land, created new fields from forests and swamps and had new buildings constructed. As well as his own farmstead, Kallio was the leader of a youth organisation, had municipal duties and was the bookkeeper at a local savings bank. As his duties at the state increased, Kallio had to spend more of his time in Helsinki and he finally had to gradually give up his local duties in Nivala. Despite this, even during his career as a member of the parliament, minister and president he kept on handling issues at his homestead from his office in Helsinki as well as it was possible with the traffic and telephone connections at the time.

=== Start of career ===
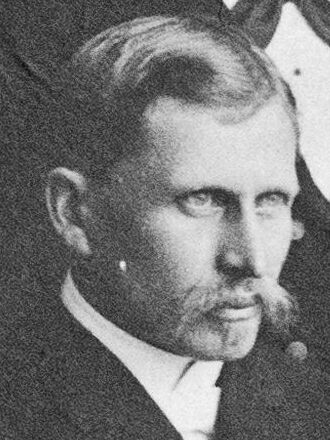
Kallio in 1907

Kallio entered politics during the first Russification campaign of Finland as a member of the Young Finnish Party. He served in the Diet of Finland from 1904 to 1906 as a member of the Estate of the Peasantry from the judicial district of Piippola at an age of only 31. Electing a candidate this young to the Diet of Finland was very uncommon at the time. Kallio's political view was that of a constitutional Young Finn, and as a member of the Kagal he opposed the military draft into the Russian Army that was seen as illegal in the Grand Duchy of Finland.

In March 1904 Kallio joined the Boden meeting organised by activists deported to Sweden. Kallio also attended the Diet of Finland in 1905 and 1906 and was elected to the Parliament of Finland in 1907 from the joint list of the Young Finns party and the Agrarian League. He joined the newly founded Agrarian League in 1906 and became one of its most prominent leaders. Kallio's reason for switching parties was that he felt that the Young Finns Party did not pay enough attention to the question of the countryside. He served as the speaker for the parliament group of the Agrarian League until 1912 and for a second term from 1914 to 1917.

After the February Revolution in Russia Kallio joined the Finnish delegation to Petrograd on 18 March 1917 with the aim to ask the Russian Provisional Government to restore the constitutional state to Finland after the period seen as the second period of oppression.

=== Finland gains independence ===
After the February Revolution of 1917 dethroned Tsar Nicholas II, the Russian provisional government tasked Vice Admiral Adrian Nepenin with overseeing the change of government in Finland. Nepenin started by inviting a handful of Finnish politicians to discuss the situation on 17 March. Kallio represented the Agrarian League; and when the Finnish politicians the next day sent a delegation to Saint Petersburg to negotiate a cessation to the Russification campaign, Kallio was again a member. The delegation was successful, and Finland was permitted to assemble a fully parliamentary Senate. Kallio came to serve as Agrarian minister in the Senate of Oskari Tokoi, taking office on 26 March. Most of his time was spent trying to mediate the agrarian strikes and finding foodstuffs for the country, while the First World War raised the prices in Europe.

After the Tsar had been dethroned, the Finnish Parliament had to decide whether the highest authority in the country had passed on to the Russian Provisional Government, the Finnish Parliament, or the Finnish Senate. The question led to serious strife between the right-wing and left-wing elements of the Parliament. Kallio initially supported the socialists in demanding that power transfer to the Parliament, but disapproved of their cooperation with Russian Bolsheviks and Mensheviks; and Kallio ultimately voted against the bill they had drafted. Nonetheless, the socialist proposal passed, which the Russian Provisional Government saw as an affront to their power; and Alexander Kerensky consequently dissolved the Finnish Parliament on 8 September. Kallio and the Socialist senators resigned from the senate, which continued to operate under the leadership of E. N. Setälä.

After the October Revolution, the Finnish bourgeoisie were willing to compromise and give parliament the highest authority fearing Bolshevik rule would spread to Finland. Setälä's Senate resigned immediately after the question was settled. Kallio was again named Agrarian Minister in the Senate of P. E. Svinhufvud whose first priority was to declare Finland independent. On 4 December the Senate introduced a declaration of independence to the Parliament; and the next day Kallio wrote a resolution, which the Parliament passed with votes 100–88.

=== Civil war ===
During the Civil War in Finland, the senate was split in two: one part remained in Helsinki while the other left for Vaasa. Kallio remained and hid in red-dominated Helsinki, because he was at least nominally on the white side and therefore a "class enemy"; he formed a new senate (government) in Helsinki after German troops had defeated the reds in the city. Afterwards he became a moderate peace-maker and disapproved of retaliation against the reds.

In early May 1918 Kallio returned to Nivala In his reconciliation speech at the Nivala Church, Kallio said the following:

We have to create a Finland where there are no reds or whites, but only Finns who love their country, citizens of the Republic of Finland, who all feel like members of society and enjoy themselves here.

This speech is considered one of the best ever held in the history of Finland despite that no original material for it has ever been found, nor is it necessarily true that Kallio ever wrote it down on paper in the first place.

=== Formation of the republic ===
During the debates over the form of the new state in 1918, Kallio resigned from the senate led by Juho Kusti Paasikivi because he supported a republic instead of constitutional monarchy, which the senate aimed to form Finland into according to what they saw as constitutional laws from the era of Swedish rule, including the Instrument of Government from the reign of Gustav III in 1772 as well as the 1789 Union and Security Act, and have the German Prince Frederick Charles of Hesse installed as the first King of Finland.

Eventually, the monarchist stand lost, and he returned to the Cabinet to become prime minister. He was a reformist who emphasized education, settlement, and land reform. His greatest achievement was "Lex Kallio" in 1922, legislation allowing the state to buy land to encourage new settlements, and to let the former tenant farmers and other landless rural people buy small farms.

=== Career in the Republic of Finland ===
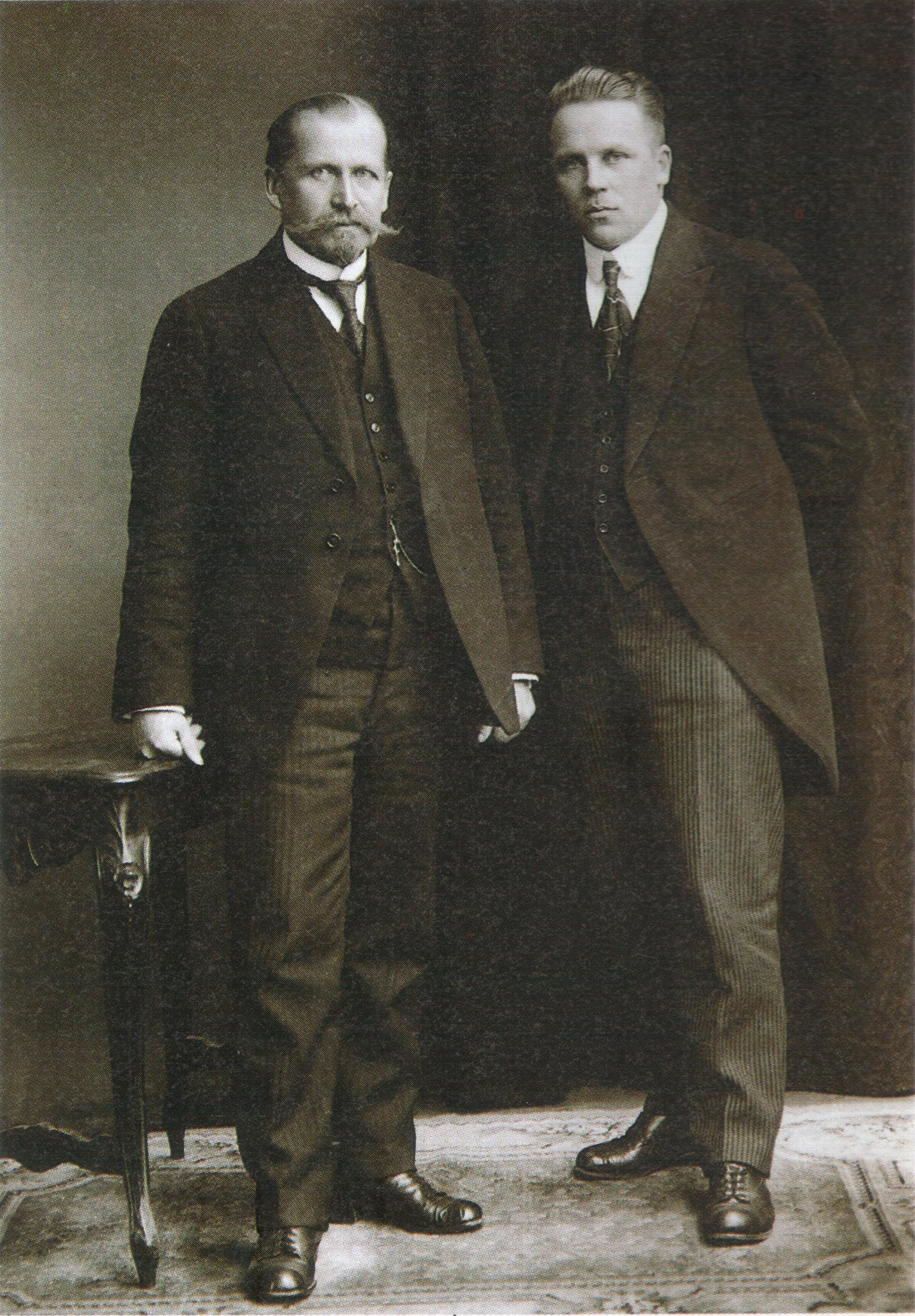
Kallio and Juho Niukkanen in 1920s

On 17 April 1919 Kallio became Minister of Agriculture at the Kaarlo Castrén cabinet and the Vennola I cabinet which followed it. Like Kaarlo Juho Ståhlberg, Kallio opposed Mannerheim's 1919 plan to conquer St. Petersburg to aid Nikolai Yudenich, with the aim to provide support for recognition of independent Finland from the governments following the temporary Russian government supported by neighbouring countries in the Russian Civil War. The temporary government had emphasised the unity and indivisibility of Russia. Kallio was also critical of the Tribal Wars in East Karelia, which caused such disagreements that Minister of the Interior Heikki Ritavuori was assassinated because of them.

In May 1920 Kallio was elected as the speaker of the Parliament of Finland. In 1921 he became Minister of Agriculture and Forestry at the Vennola II cabinet in 1921, where he proposed the law known as "Lex Kallio", aiming to expropriate land to form farmsteads for steadless people and expand independent crofts into farmsteads. Kallio's plan was a success after the right wing lost the election in 1922. Kallio served as speaker of the parliament for a total of 15 terms up to 1936. He is the second-longest serving speaker of the parliament in the history of Finland, after Karl-August Fagerholm who held the post for 16 terms.

Kyösti Kallio first became the Prime Minister of Finland on 14 November 1922. His cabinet arrested about 200 members of the Socialist Workers' Party of Finland in August 1923, in an incident known as "Kallio's cut". As well as the parliamentary group, the leadership of the Socialist Workers' Party was also arrested. The calm president Ståhlberg had not expected Kallio's cabinet to take such drastic measures. The Social Democrats demanded the immediate dismissal of Kallio's cabinet and a new election as the parliament had become incomplete because of the arrest of the members of the Socialist Workers' Party, while the bourgeoisie thought they would first have to wait for a decision from the court, deciding if the communists had the right to take part in the election. Kyösti Kallio declined to submit a request for the dismissal of his cabinet, but president Ståhlberg took the Social Democrats' side, ordered a new election, dismissed Kallio's ministers and appointed a caretaker cabinet led by Aimo Cajander, the speaker of the forestry government in place of Kallio's cabinet.

In 1922, the Young Finn politician Santeri Alkio withdrew from the parliament, causing the internal chord within the Agrarian League to consist of Kallio and Juho Sunila. Kallio supported the wishes of the countryside while Sunila was more focused on the agrarian industry. In the dispute between Kallio and Sunila, Kallio was supported by veteran Agrarian League politicians, true Finns and Ostrobothnians, while Sunila was supported by educated younger agrarians and most members of the parliament from the Agrarian League from southern and eastern Finland. As well as the Lex Kallio, the Lex Pulkkinen was introduced in 1925 to expand the land reform, restoring properties from wood stock companies to the state to further distribute among the farmers. In early 1938 Lex Kallio was replaced with a new settlement law.

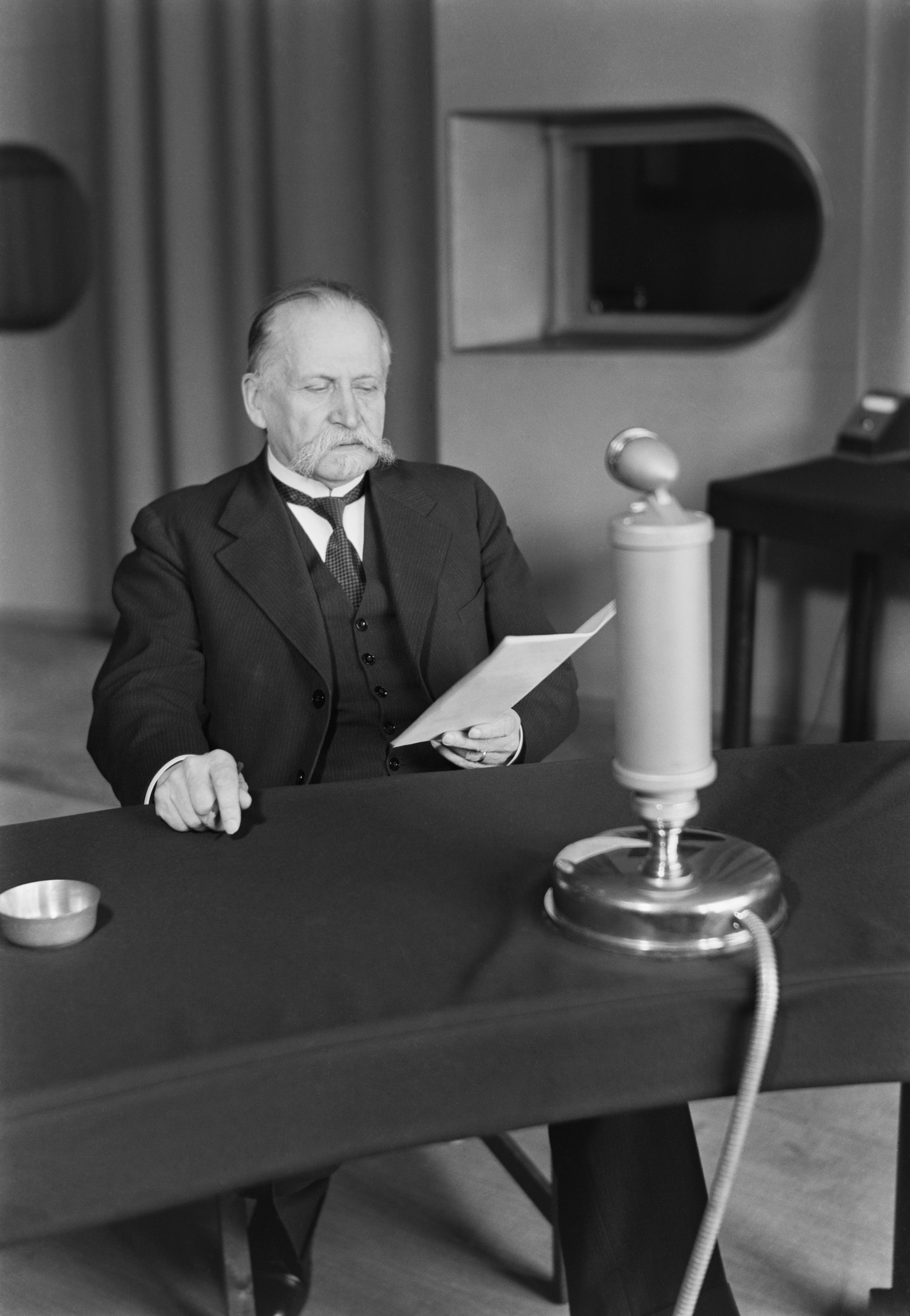
Prime Minister Kallio speaking on the radio in 1930

Because of questions about land ownership, the relationships of the Agrarian League with the National Coalition Party founded in 1918 by the monarchist supporters from the Suometar and Young Finns parties grew problematic in the 1920s, and government cabinets were relatively short-lived, even resulting in the Social Democratic minority cabinet led by Väinö Tanner under president Lauri Kristian Relander in 1926. Even as president, the Agrarian Relander took part in the discussion between Sunila and Kallio under the time of sparse parlamentarism, offering Kallio a possibility to retire as a governor, which Kallio did not accept. Juho Sunila withdrew from politics in 1933, leaving the Agrarian League to be led by Kallio.

In 1923 Risto Ryti, the director of the Bank of Finland, offered the job of banker to Kallio. Ryti was also a good friend of Kallio and a colleague of his from government cabinets in the 1920s. Kallio's appointment as banker did not go without problems. He was himself hesitant. His own party opposed the idea of mixing the party with central bank politics, which they thought director Ryti was using to steer the politics of the Agrarian League with getting Kallio as the new banker at the Bank of Finland. Kallio also had personal enemies. Alkio was known for his opposition. Relander and Sunila had a steadfast grip on the group and could well have opposed Kallio. The bank officials made their discussion in accordance with the proposal of the board, and prime minister Tanner acting on behalf of the president appointed Kallio as a member of the board at the Bank of Finland in May 1927. His duty at the bank was overseeing the credit and the branch offices of the bank. Kallio's duty as a banker became a great burden for him during the Great Depression in the early 1930s, even though he used his strong economic relations for the benefit of those in need.

In 1929 the Kallio III cabinet was preparing an anti-communist legislature to extinguish the strike movement led by the Communist Party of Finland during the Great Depression, which caused the Lapua Movement to grow stronger. Kallio was asked to join the Lapua Movement as its leader, even as its dictator, but he refused, which made him unpopular in the eyes of the agrarian right. President Relander sided with the right and the Kallio III cabinet was dismissed on 2 July 1930, after which Pehr Evind Svinhufvud who had served as a caretaker head of state in 1918 from the Young Finns Party and now was now a member of the National Coalition Party formed a new cabinet by drafting new protection laws known as communist laws, limiting the constitutionally protected rights for organisation and assembly, to pacify the right-wing radicalism which had started at the Lapua Movement and the peasants' march and had caused the Mäntsälä rebellion and the forming of the Patriotic People's Movement. Because the communist laws failed to get a 5/6 majority necessary for urgency mainly because opposition from the Social Democrats, a new parliamentary election was held in 1930, after which the laws could be passed with a lesser majority.

=== Supported prohibition ===
He supported prohibition in Finland, and was dismayed when it was repealed in 1932.

=== Non-violent anti-communist ===
Kallio was an anti-communist, suppressing the Communist Party of Finland (SKP) in 1923. However, he resorted to legislative methods. When the violent right-wing Lapua Movement asked him to become their leader, he refused and was then instead subjected to their death threats.

=== President ===
President P. E. Svinhufvud (left) pays a congratulatory visit to Kallio on the occasion of his 60th birthday in 1933.

At the 1931 Finnish presidential election, Kyösti Kallio was the candidate for the Agrarian League after Relander had had to move aside as a director of an insurance company because the Agrarian League no longer supported him. However, Kallio only received 56 electoral votes of 300 and Pehr Evind Svinhufvud was elected president instead.

Sunila's time had passed because of the Great Depression. Kallio's support in his electoral district was diminished because people felt he had not done enough to overcome the depression. A movement started in Kallio's own electoral district of Kalajoki, leading to the so-called horse rebellion of Nivala in 1932. In 1933, Kallio's re-election to the parliament was endangered.

In 1932, the government appointed a committee by request from the parliament, directed by Kyösti Kallio and the other members consisting of director of the Road and waterworks administration Evert Skogström, director of the Railway administration Jalmar Castrén, professor of railway, road and water construction Arvo Lönnroth from the Helsinki University of Technology and professor of Nordic history Väinö Voionmaa from the University of Helsinki. The mission of the committee was to come up with a suggestion of organising the main road network of Finland so that it would not compete with the railway. The committee came up with its notes in late 1936 and this was used to number the highways in Finland in 1938.

After the 1936 Finnish parliamentary election, Kallio offered to form a new cabinet to succeed the Kivimäki cabinet in accordance with the Social Democratic Party, but the President of Finland P. E. Svinhufvud from the National Coalition Party would have refused to appoint this cabinet. So the Kallio IV cabinet was instead formed from the Progressive Party and the Agrarian League without the Social Democratic Party.

Kallio's position had strengthened, not only because the overall economic situation had grown better and the criticism towards the distress movements had diminished, but also because Sunila from the Agrarian League left politics and Juho Niukkanen, the strong Karelian minister of finance had withdrawn from the parliament for the period of 1933 to 1936. However, Niukkanen was appointed as minister of finance to the Kallio IV cabinet after the 1936 election. Kallio's competitor in the Agrarian League Sunila, supported to president Relander, died in 1936.

Rudolf Holsti from the Progressive Party had come back to politics and was appointed as minister of foreign affairs to the Kallio IV cabinet, and he was known for his critical view of Germany. Holsti sought to improve relations between Finland and the Soviet Union, and in 1937 he became the first Finnish minister of foreign affairs to visit Moscow. Prime minister Kallio sought approval of the parliament for Holsti's trip in advance and president P. E. Svinhufvud did not oppose this despite his suspicions. However, the visit to Moscow was of little benefit.

In the 1937 Finnish presidential election Kallio was elected president with the votes of a centrist (Agrarian and Progressive) and social democratic coalition, which wanted to ensure that President Svinhufvud would not be re-elected. This coalition made a strong campaign with the popular slogan: "Ukko-Pekka uudelleen - Luumäelle!" ("Re-elect Old Man Pekka - to Luumäki!")

President Kallio assumes his post in 1937; in the picture, Kallio is being interviewed.

On the second round of the electoral college president Svinhufvud received 104 votes, former president Ståhlberg received 19 votes and Kallio received 177 votes. The political far right, which had sought to re-elect Svinhufvud, was disappointed at Kallio's election and saw that the only good thing about the election was that the "national disaster" Ståhlberg was not elected. The Social Democratic Party took Kallio's election as a victory for parliamentarism, as Kallio took the role of a parliamentarian president, avoided use of his personal power and was ready for the rights of the President of Finland to be narrowed down. As president, Kallio was somewhat of a compromise, and he had no real political opponents.

Kallio's victory at the presidential election was also noticed in the Soviet Union, and President of the Soviet Union Mikhail Kalinin sent Kallio a warm-hearted congratulatory telegram, which no previous President of Finland had received. When Kallio said at the Parliament of Finland that Finland would take arms against any attack to its sovereignty and infiltration, the Soviet ambassador to Finland Eric Assmus interpreted this to refer to Nazi Germany. Maxim Litvinov, the Soviet minister of foreign affairs, said to his Swedish colleague Rickard Sandler who was visiting Moscow in summer 1937 that the Soviet Union would trust that Finland would not pose a threat to it, even if the Soviet Union would have to go to war against Germany and Japan.

The most heated relationship of the student youth to Kallio and other political leaders in Finland was evident in that when Kallio was invited to the annual celebration of the Student Union of the University of Helsinki in autumn 1937, Doctor Niilo Pesonen who held the introductory speech was heavily critical of Kallio's peacemaking politics. Kallio left the event early and so avoided hearing the celebratory speech of Doctor Vilho Helanen. According to Helanen, in 1937 Finland was undergoing a mental depression similar to 1809, when the country was led by inadequate leaders, who did not understand what the real benefit of the people required.

President Kallio and Mrs. Kaisa Kallio watching the 1938 World Ski Championships held in Lahti.

No great initiatives or dramatic actions of a head of state from Kallio's term as president are left in history. The majority government calmed domestic politics down, and there was no need for any sort of referee over different parties. The language disputes between the Finnish-speaking and Swedish-speaking people had already calmed down under Svinhufvud's term as president. The focal point of decision-making was at the internal negotiations between the government parties. For a few times, Kallio requested permission to join the government's unofficial discussions known as "the government evening school", but his requests were denied. After this Kallio was busy calling various instances to find out what the government was up to.

Kallio had an important role in the national unification of the Finnish people. His election as president made the so-called "red soil cooperation" between the Social Democratic Party and the Agrarian League possible, and this continued for the next 50 years.

The strong Social Democrat Väinö Tanner late praised Kallio's selfless and calm manner understanding different points of view. On the other hand, Juho Kusti Paasikivi, the Finnish ambassador to Stockholm at the time, did not appreciate Kallio, which was evident in that he kept contact with the prime minister and the minister for foreign affairs as well as Väinö Tanner bypassing the president entirely.A P. E. Svinhfuvud thought of Kallio as a weak personality, but nonetheless a better choice than K. J. Ståhlberg, who according to Svinhufvud would have given the government away to the socialists.

After becoming president, Kallio appointed the first ever "red soil" cabinet in Finland, led by the Progressive Party prime minister Aimo Cajander up to the Winter War. Even though the form of government in Finland stated that leadership of foreign politics was the duty of the president, Kallio remained passive in foreign politics. Prime minister Cajander was interested in foreign politics, but minister of foreign affairs Rudolf Holsti guarded his post jealously. Since spring 1938 discussion were held between Soviet expert Boris Rybkin and the Finnish government delegation consisting of the prime minister, minister of foreign affairs Holsti and deputy minister of foreign affairs Väinö Voionmaa, financial minister Väinö Tanner and secretary of the prime minister Arvo Inkilä. As Kallio had fallen sick, he could not receive Rybkin when he asked to meet him.

In foreign politics, Kallio supported minister of foreign affairs Holsti, who supported neutrality and the Nordic direction after the 1920s border state politics. In December 1938 Eljas Erkko, who was appointed the new minister of foreign affairs and was an Anglophile just like Holsti, guarded foreign politics even more jealously than Holsti, and the foreign politics delegation of the government did not dare to ask for information from the minister. Despite maintaining neutrality, Finland was forced to enter the Winter War. In October 1939 before the Winter War Kallio visited Stockholm for a meeting of Nordic heads of state, with the aim of showing Nordic support for Finland. The event failed to reach its intended result, which meant there was no military support for Finland. After returning to Finland Kallio said a single word to people close to him: "yksin" ("alone").

In summer 1939 Kallio supported Marshal Mannerheim continuing at his post of chairman of the defence council preparing to defend Finland after Mannerheim had got into an argument with the Agrarian League defence minister Juho Niukkanen and the Social Democratic financial minister Väinö Tanner about disagreements about his power. In the summer in the same year, Mannerheim had expressed his worries about lowering the grant for the defence forces as Europe was undergoing a critical point in a situation of war and had sent a letter of explanation to Kallio, but was denied the funds as Kallio appealed to the burden they would have caused on the Finnish people.

On the eve of the Winter War, when Mannerheim once again threatened to resign from his post as chairman of Finland's Defence Council due to a schism with the cabinet, Kallio convinced him to stay. During the war Kallio resisted the idea of giving up any territory to the Soviet Union, but was forced to agree to sign the Moscow Peace Treaty in 1940. His health began to fail – and his right arm was paralyzed – He was not active in the dealings with Germany leading to the Continuation War. On 27 August Kallio suffered a serious stroke. Prime Minister Risto Ryti took over his duties. Kallio's heart became weak while he knowingly took risks by agreeing to the formal farewell ceremonies.

=== Resignation and death ===
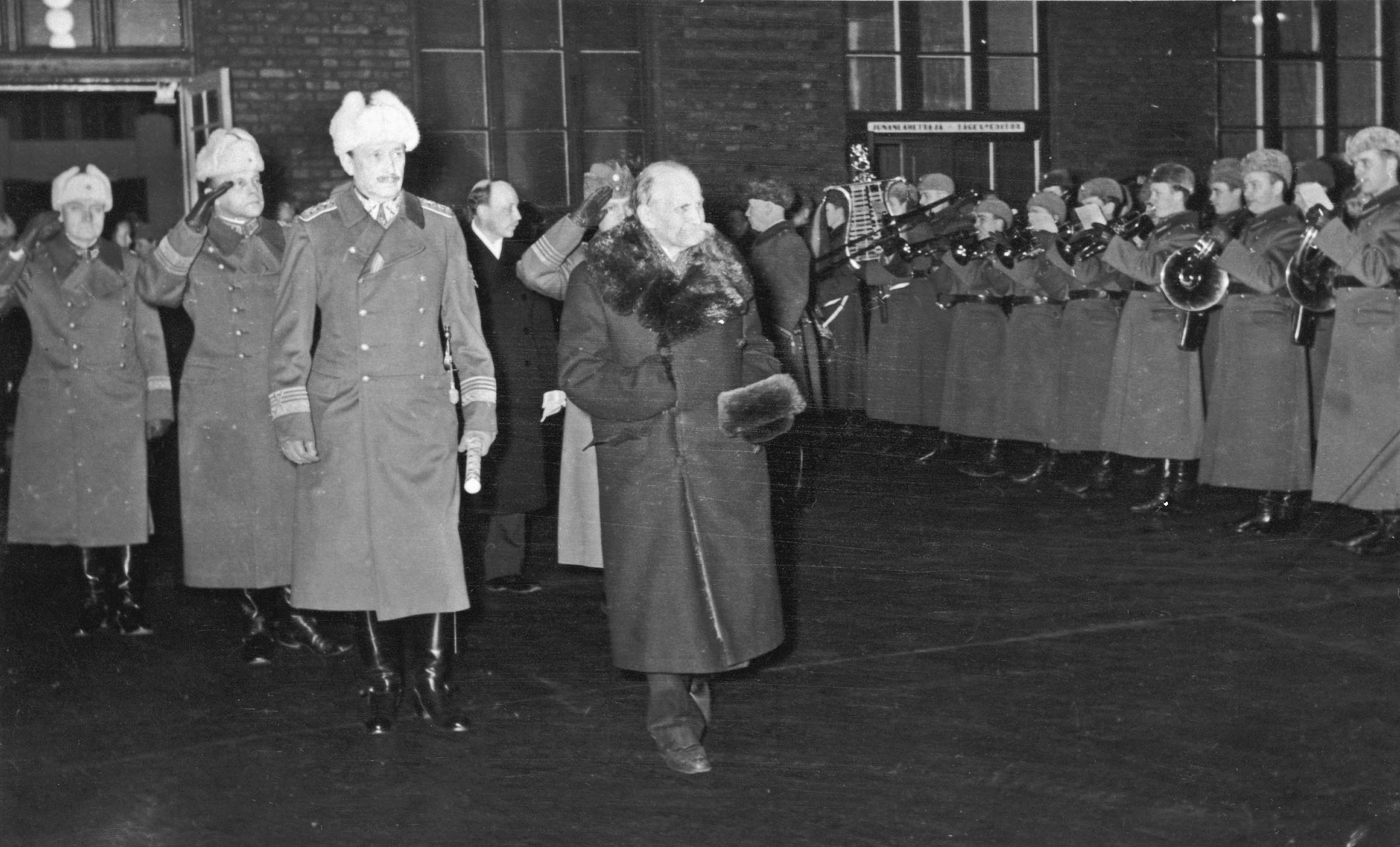
Kallio (centre, at the front) together with Mannerheim (left of Kallio) at the Helsinki railway station on 19 December 1940. Kallio had a fatal heart attack a few seconds after this photograph was taken by Hugo Sundström.

A plaque at the Helsinki Central railway station at the spot where Kyösti Kallio died on 19 December 1940

Already during the Winter War Kallio's health had been failing and because of this, he was unable to work from time to time, although this was never made public at the time. Politics and attempts at peace with the Soviet Union in 1940 were practically handled by the prime minister Risto Ryti, the minister of foreign affairs Väinö Tanner and the Finnish ambassador to the Soviet Union Juho Kusti Paasikivi in Moscow. This war cabinet kept constant tight contact with Marshal Mannerheim's headquarters in Mikkeli. During the negotiations with the Soviet Union in autumn 1939 Kallio had been more relentless than Mannerheim and Paasikivi, who would have been inclined to an agreement of territory exchange with the Soviet Union. Väinö Tanner later said that the peace negotiations had at first been kept secret from Kallio, as it was even more painful for him to make important decisions when his health was failing.

Kallio left a notice of resignation on 27 November 1940. As the situation at the time was not seen to allow for normal electoral college elections, an exceptional law came into force, allowing the 1937 electoral college to assemble to elect a new president. The electoral college elected prime minister Risto Ryti to succeed Kallio on 19 December 1940.

On the same day as Ryti had been elected as the new president, former president Kallio was planning to leave the capital and retire to his farm at Nivala after the farewell ceremonies on the evening of 19 December 1940; but he collapsed and died that night at the Helsinki Central Railway Station - while his term had at least officially still been in force - in the arms of his adjutant before a guard of honour while a band played the patriotic Finnish march Porilaisten marssi. One story tells that Kallio died in the arms of Marshal Mannerheim, but this is most likely part of the construction of Mannerheim's personal cult. It is more plausible that Kallio died in the arms of his adjutant Aladár Paasonen and potentially colonel A. F. Airo also.

== Religious views ==
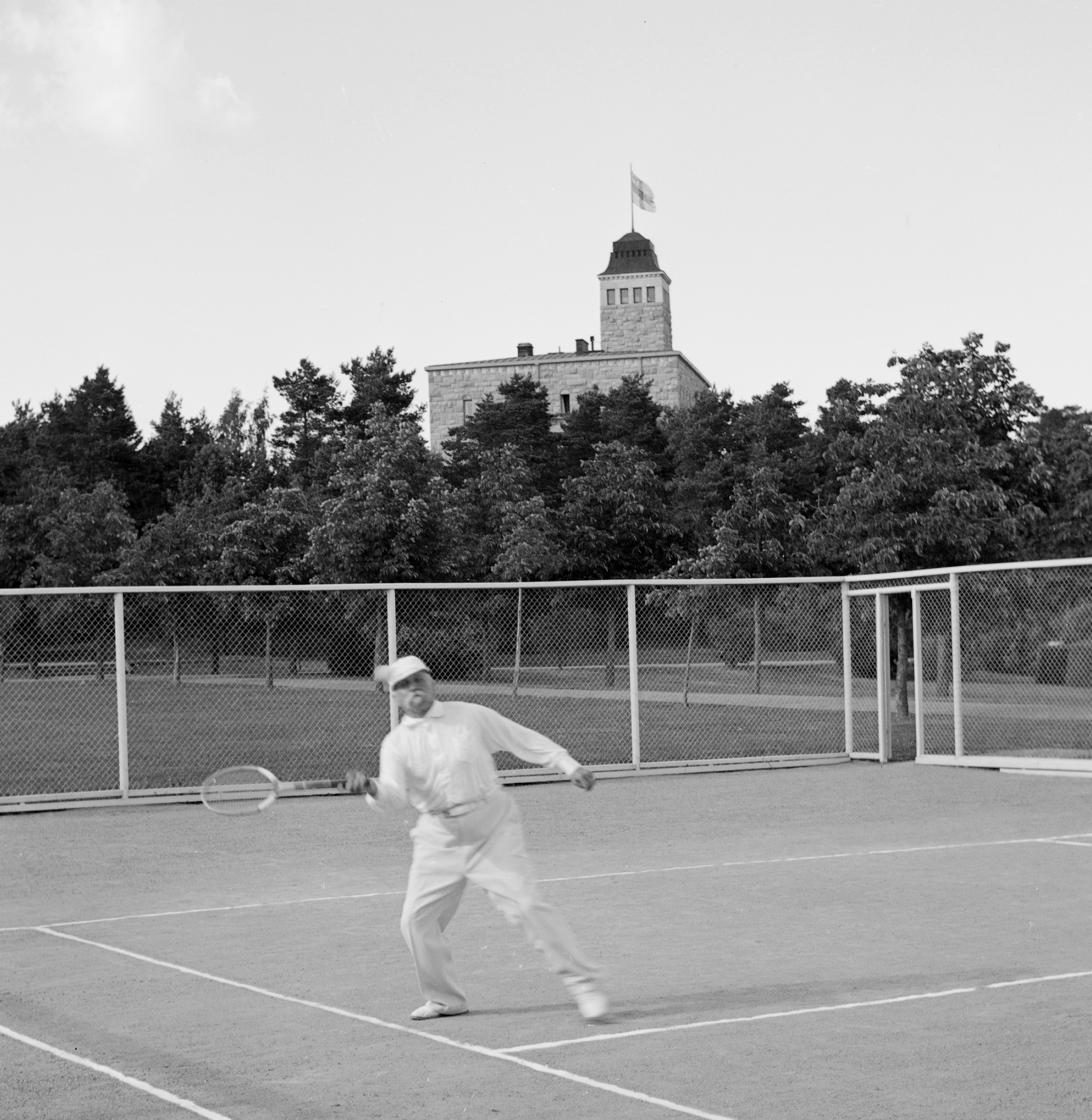
President Kyösti Kallio playing tennis at Kultaranta

A significant part of Kallio's personality and a motive for the social reforms which he supported and promoted was his deep Christian faith, which he had adopted already at home, and which was deepened during his marriage to Kaisa Nivala, who was also a devout Christian. Although Kallio was often too busy to go to church, he prayed often when encountering difficulties in making political decisions, and some of these prayers he recorded in his diary. He also read Christian books with his wife and often discussed them by exchanging letters. He often referred to God in his speeches, and during the Winter War he asked the Finns who were serving their country to read the Bible. When he was forced to sign the harsh Moscow Peace Treaty in March 1940, Kallio quoted freely from the Book of Zechariah, saying:

"May my hand, which is forced to sign such a paper, wither."

His right arm was paralysed the following summer, and he was forced to switch his writing hand. In the Presidential Palace, shortly before leaving for Helsinki Central Railway Station for the last time, Kallio sang a hymn with his family.

== Supplemental biography ==
Kyösti Kallio was deeply religious - he came from a pietist family - and was an absolute teetotaller. In 1932 he took the repeal of prohibition in Finland that had been in force since 1919 as a personal defeat. When Kallio was visiting the parliament of Hungary in his role as speaker of the parliament of Finland, he caused a complete shock to his hosts by requesting milk to drink at the official banquet. When Kallio became president, the largest change in the presidential palace in Finland was the complete stop of serving alcoholic beverages in all events. In addition, there was no dancing at any Independence Day Reception during Kallio's time as president. When appointing Kaarlo Hillilä as the governor of the Lapland Province Kallio made him promise not to drink any alcohol. Kaisa Kallio's loom was taken into the presidential palace into the same room where Ellen Svinhufvud's loom had been taken away from shortly before.

When a condolence petition was being assembled in Nivala in 1904 in memory of the recently assassinated governor-general Nikolay Bobrikov, Kallio snatched the paper from the hand of the petitioner, tore it into pieces in front of him and threw it into the fire.

Kallio's religiousness and abstinence from alcohol gave him an image of a solemn and narrow-minded person. However, his close friends have described him as a social person who understood intelligent wordplay. In appropriate company, Kallio indulged in good-natured humour. In his youth, Kallio's favourite sport was cross-country skiing, and he won numerous prizes in skiing competitions. In his older years, Kallio raised racehorses, and even in his years as a government minister he successfully took part in races. In addition to this, Kallio had time to attend theatre plays and concerts.

== Legacy ==
The statue of Kyösti Kallio in the immediate vicinity of the House of Parliament in Finland was uncovered on 10 November 1962. The statue had been sculpted by Kyösti Kallio's son Kalervo Kallio. Before this, Kalervo Kallio had sculpted a memorial sculpture to the grave of his parents in 1949. In 1973, on the 100th anniversary of Kyösti Kallio's birth, there were numerous occassions in his memory. At his birthplace in Ylivieska a memorial sculpted by Onni Vähäkangas was uncovered in August 1973. The memorial includes a relief by sculptor Risto Saalasti with the words "Cooperation and responsibility unite the people", symbolising the communal actions of Kyösti Kallio.

In 1973 a museum foundation in the memory of Kyösti Kallio and his son sculptor Kalervo Kallio was founded at Kyösti Kallio's birthplace, thanks to whose activities a Kyösti and Kalervo Kallio Museum was founded in Nivala in 1977. The purpose of the foundation is to collect material related to the life's work of Kyösti and Kalervo Kallio to the museum.

There are numerous streets in Finland named after Kyösti Kallio. In the Kulosaari district of Helsinki there is a street named Kyösti Kallion tie and in Lahti there is a street named Kyösti Kallion katu, acting as the eastern limit of the Fellmaninpuisto park. There is a park called Kyösti Kallio park in Oulu at the area where Kyösti Kallio lived in his school years. The birthplace of Kyösti Kallio honoured his memory by naming the 2008 Alavieska, Nivala, Sievi and Ylivieska basic public services district as "Peruspalvelukuntayhtymä Kallio". Also the Central Ostrobothnian fund of the Finnish Cultural Foundation has founded a fund in honour of Kyösti Kallio.

On the 100th anniversary of the 1918 Finnish Civil War the activity of senator Kallio at his birthplace in Nivala came into attention. At the end of the war in May 1918 Kallio made a speech aiming at peace by saying that there was a need to build a Finland, where "there were no reds or whites, only Finns loving their country, citizens of the Republic of Finland, who would all feel part of the society and feel comfortable there". President of Finland Sauli Niinistö honoured the event with his presence by mentioning Kallio's speech in his own speech.

== In popular culture ==
Kallio was played by Ossi Ahlapuro in the 2001 television film Valtapeliä elokuussa 1940, directed by Veli-Matti Saikkonen.

== Gallery ==
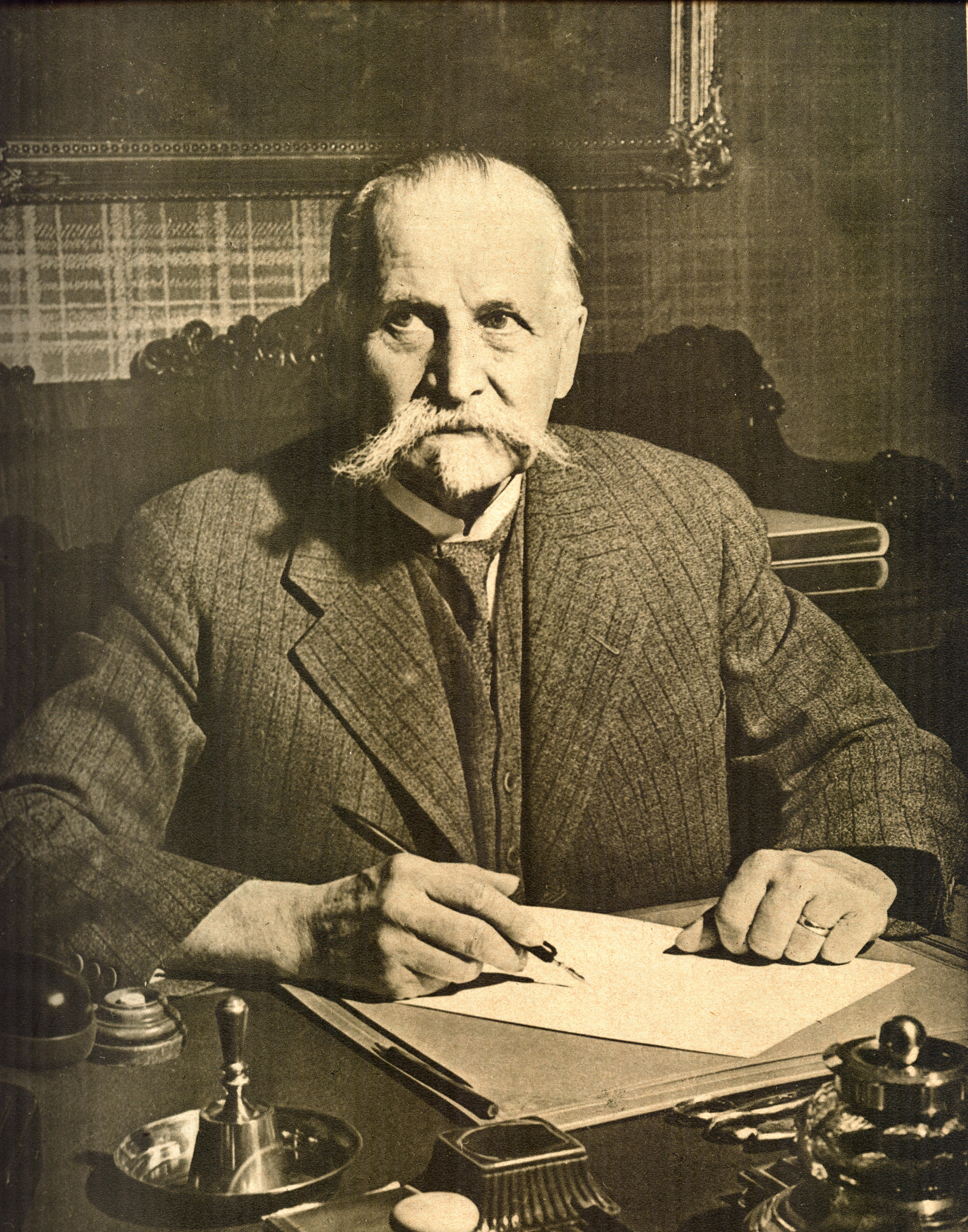
Kallio in his office.

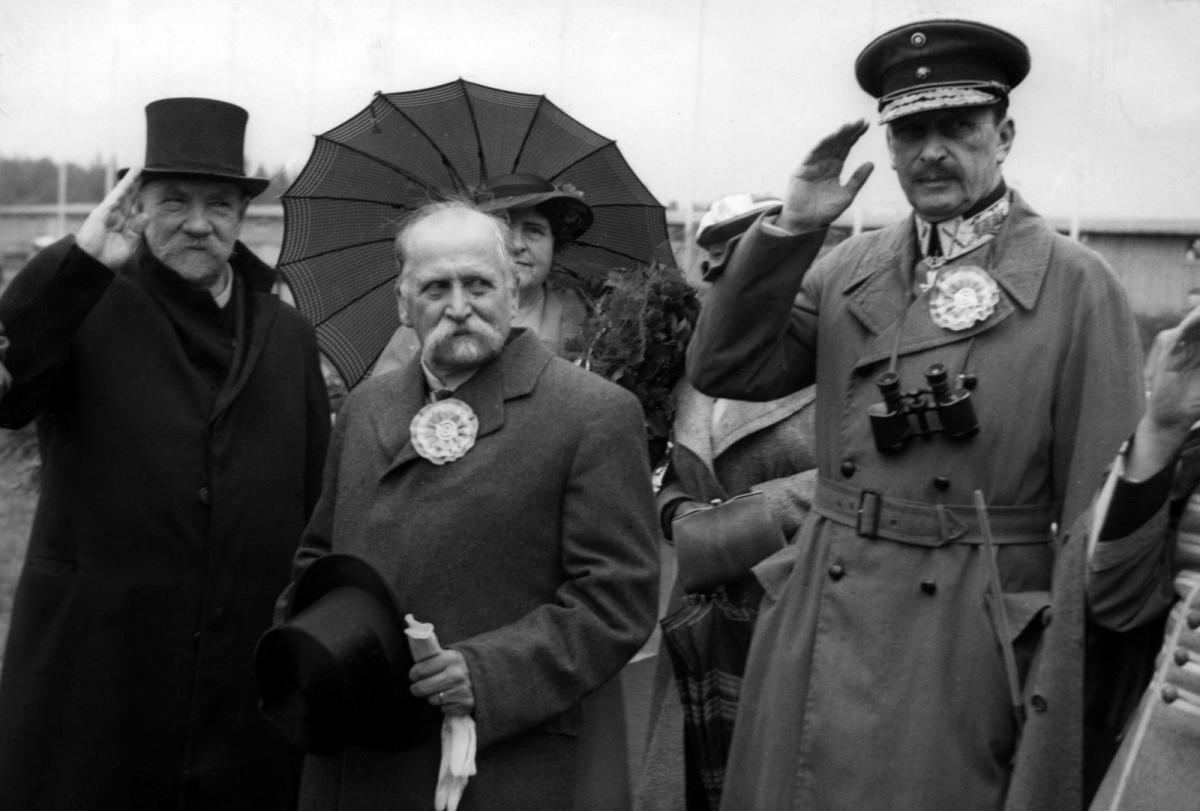
From left to right: president P. E. Svinhufvud, president Kallio and marshal C. G. E. Mannerheim

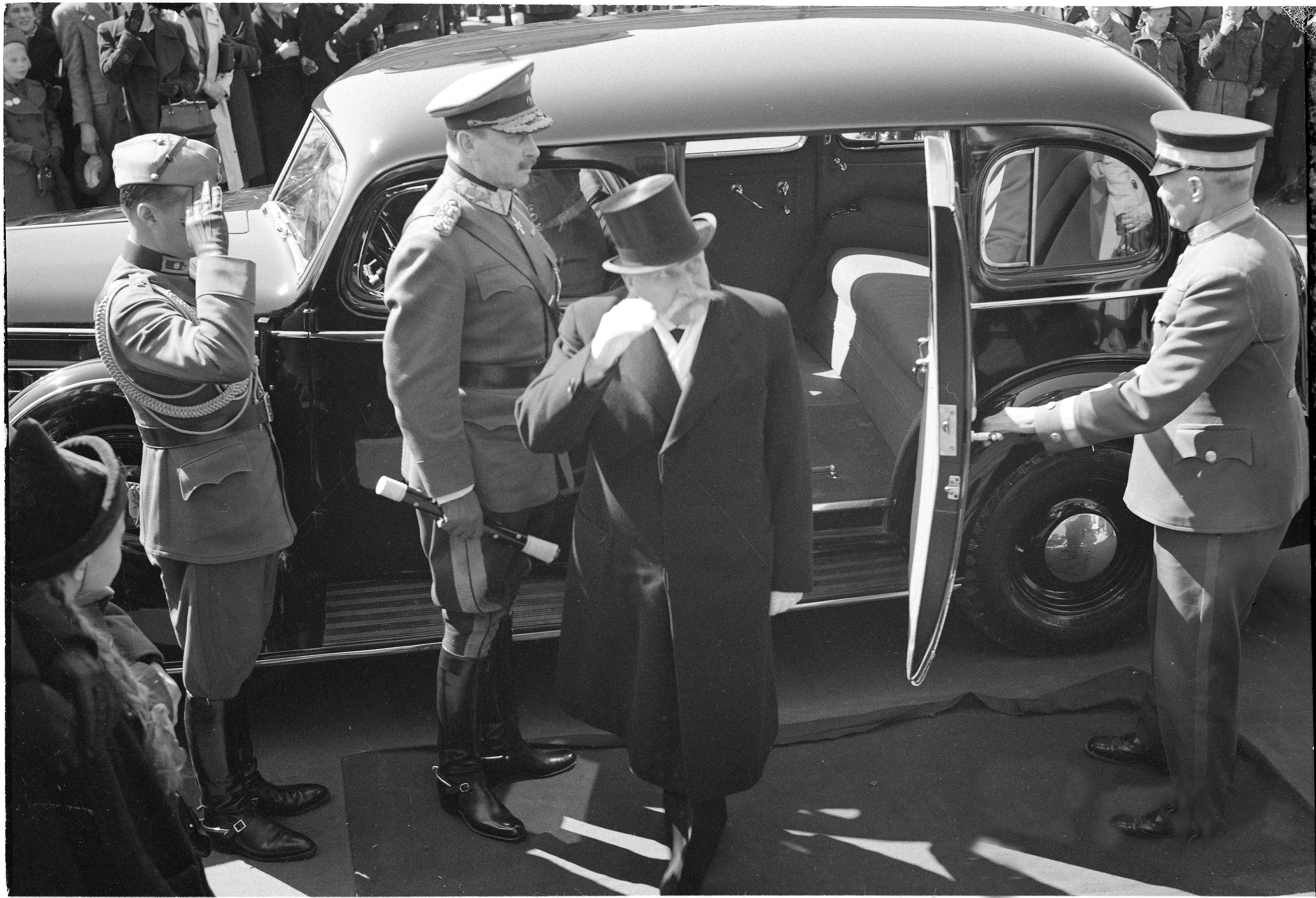
Kallio stepping out of his car; Marshal Mannerheim stands left from him.

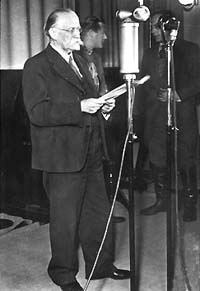
Kallio giving his New Year's speech in 1940.

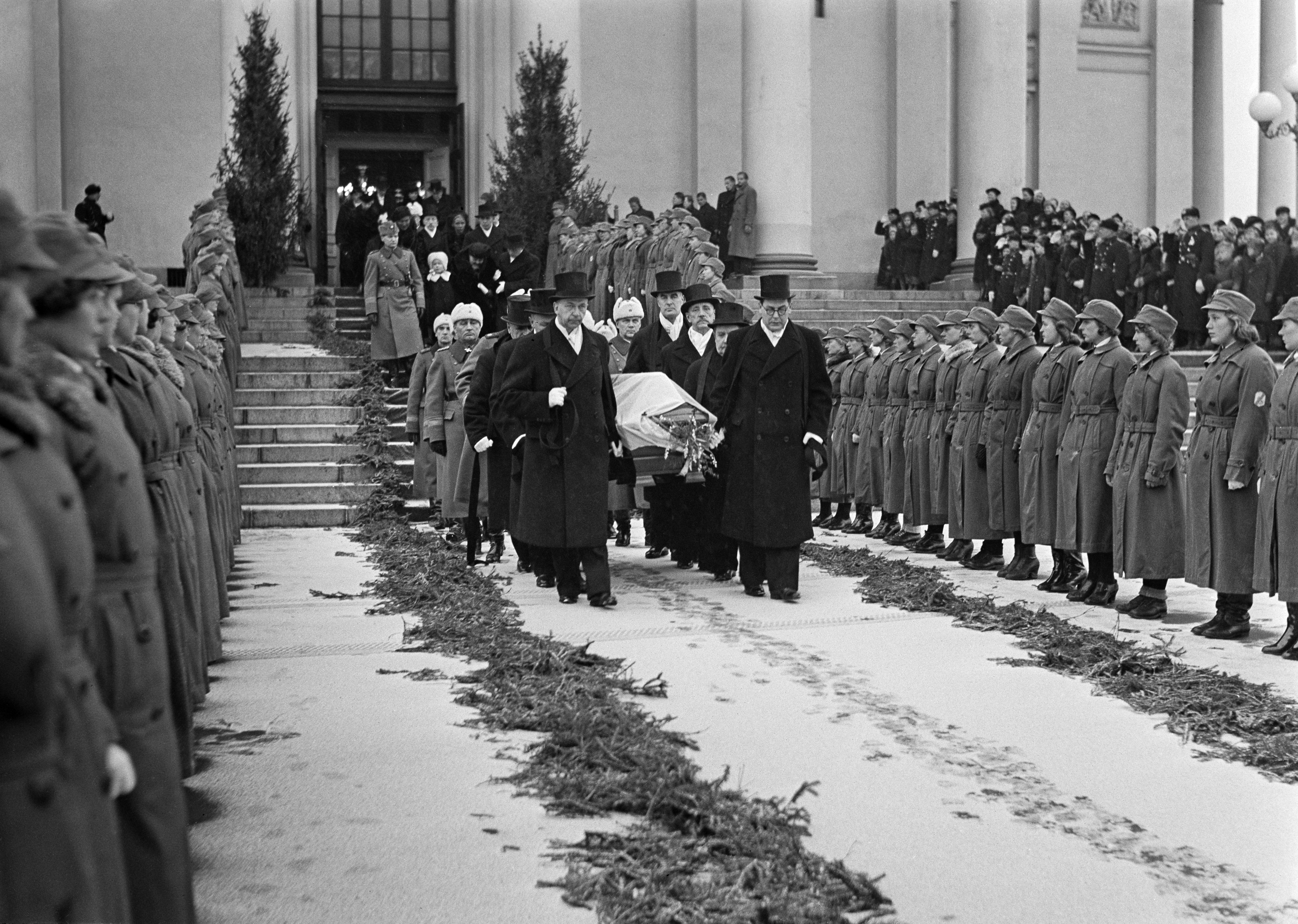
The funeral of President Kyösti Kallio in 1940

== Cabinets ==
- Kallio I Cabinet
- Kallio II Cabinet
- Kallio III Cabinet
- Kallio IV Cabinet

Kyösti Kallio
- Armiger: Kyösti Kallio

== Honours ==
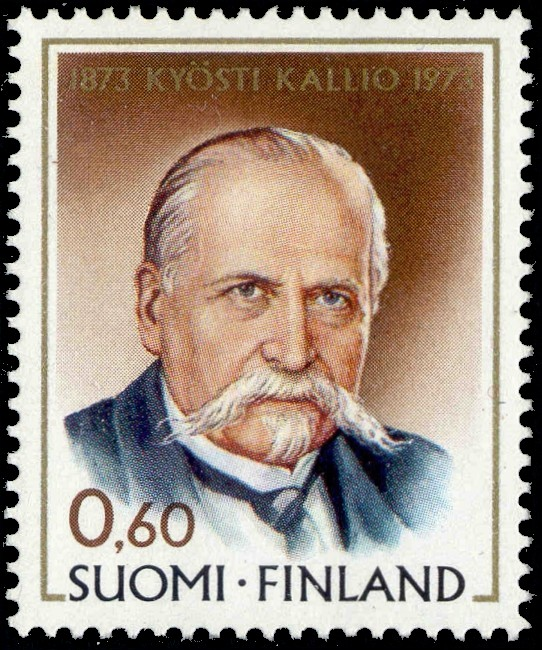
Postage stamp of President Kallio from 1973.

=== Awards and decorations ===
- Grand Cross of the Order of the White Rose (Finland)
- (Finland) Grand Cross of the Order of the Cross of Liberty
- Knight of the Order of the Seraphim (Sweden)
- Order of the Polar Star (Sweden)
- Order of the Falcon (Iceland)
- (Estonia) Collar of the Order of the White Star
- Cross of Liberty Military Leadership (Estonia)
- Cross of Liberty Civilian Service (Estonia)
- (Estonia) Order of the Cross of the Eagle
- (Estonia) Order of the Estonian Red Cross
- Order of the Three Stars (Latvia)
- (Kingdom of Hungary (1920–1946)) Order of Merit (Hungary)
- (Poland) Order of Polonia Restituta

== See also ==
- List of presidents of Finland

Political offices
Preceded by Lauri Kristian Relander	Speaker of the Parliament of Finland; 1920	Succeeded by Wäinö Wuolijoki
Preceded by Wäinö Wuolijoki	Speaker of the Parliament of Finland; 1922	Succeeded by Wäinö Wuolijoki
Preceded by Aimo Cajander	Prime Minister of Finland; 1922–1924	Succeeded by Aimo Cajander
Preceded by Paavo Virkkunen	Speaker of the Parliament of Finland; 1924-1925	Succeeded by Wäinö Wuolijoki
Preceded by Antti Tulenheimo	Prime Minister of Finland; 1925–1926	Succeeded by Väinö Tanner
Preceded by Paavo Virkkunen	Speaker of the Parliament of Finland; 1927	Succeeded by Paavo Virkkunen
Preceded by Paavo Virkkunen	Speaker of the Parliament of Finland; 1929	Succeeded by Paavo Virkkunen
Preceded by Oskari Mantere	Prime Minister of Finland; 1929–1930	Succeeded by Pehr Evind Svinhufvud
Preceded by Juho Sunila	Speaker of the Parliament of Finland; 1930-1936	Succeeded by Väinö Hakkila
Preceded by Toivo Mikael Kivimäki	Prime Minister of Finland; 1936–1937	Succeeded by Aimo Cajander
Preceded by Pehr Evind Svinhufvud	President of Finland; 1937–1940	Succeeded by Risto Ryti
