= Kerttu Saalasti =

Finnish politician (1907–1995)

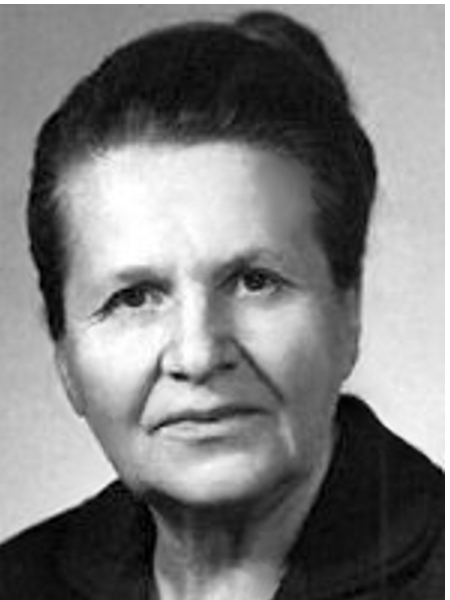

Member of the Parliament of Finland
- In office 22 July 1948 – 19 February 1962; 5 April 1966 – 22 March 1970
- Constituency: Oulu

Finland Minister of Education
- In office 20 October 1954 – 3 March 1956; 27 May 1957 – 29 November 1957
- Prime Minister: Urho Kekkonen; V. J. Sukselainen

Personal details
- Born: Kerttu Kallio; 21 September 1907 Nivala, Finland
- Died: 31 January 1995 (aged 87) Nivala, Finland
- Party: Agrarian League
- Spouse: Filip Teuvo Saalasti (m. 1936; died 1947)
- Children: 7
- Parent(s): Kyösti Kallio (father); Kaisa Nivala (mother)
- Education: University of Helsinki

Kerttu Saalasti (née Kallio; 21 September 1907 – 31 January 1995) was a Finnish politician who was the Finland Minister of Education from 1954 to 1956 and from May 1957 to November 1957. She was the first female Minister of Education in Finland, and introduced the legislation that established the University of Oulu. A member of the Agrarian League, Saalasti also represented Oulu in the Parliament of Finland from 1948 to 1962 and from 1966 to 1970.

== Early life and education ==
Kerttu Kallio was born on 21 September 1907 in Nivala, Finland. She was the daughter of Kyösti Kallio, who was later elected as the fourth president of Finland in 1937, and Kaisa Nivala. After graduating from secondary school in Oulu in 1927, she attended the University of Helsinki, where she received a bachelor's degree in agriculture and forestry in 1935 and the Master of Science degree in agriculture in 1936. Kallio became the hostess of a farm in Nivala in 1936 after marrying Filip Teuvo Saalasti, the son of Finnish politician Filip Saalasti; they had five children. She taught agriculture at the local folk high school, and was elected to the municipal council of Nivala in 1937 as the only female member of the council. After Filip died of lung disease on 9 June 1947, Kerttu took over the farm's responsibilities.

== Political career ==
Saalasti was elected to the Parliament of Finland in 1948 to represent the Oulu constituency as a member of the Agrarian League (now the Centre Party). She was a member of Parliament from 22 July 1948 to 19 February 1962, and again from 5 April 1966 to 22 March 1970. During her time in Parliament, Saalasti was a member of the Education and Culture committee and a Finnish representative to the Nordic Council. She was a presidential elector in 1950, 1956, 1962, and 1968. She frequently focused on agricultural and rural issues, supported the temperance movement in Finland, and advocated for a greater role for women in Finnish politics.

Prime minister Urho Kekkonen appointed Saalasti as Minister of Education on 20 October 1954. She held the position in Kekkonen's fifth cabinet until Karl-August Fagerholm took office as prime minister on 3 March 1956. She was the first female Minister of Education of Finland, and was later re-appointed to the position by prime minister V. J. Sukselainen from 27 May 1957 to 29 November 1957. As education minister, Saalasti introduced the legislation that led to the establishment of the University of Oulu. The bill, which was signed into law by President Kekkonen on 25 October 1957, has been described as the highlight of Saalasti's political career, one of her most significant achievements, and a "significant national policy action". She also worked on government reforms of primary schools and higher education in Finland, and campaigned for educational equity.

== Later life and death ==
Saalasti was awarded the title of Opetusneuvos (Councillor of Education) by Kekkonen in 1969, and received an honorary doctoral degree from the University of Oulu in 1972. She authored a biography of her parents, titled Anna hänelle nöyrä mieli: Kaisa ja Kyösti Kallion elämäntieltä, published in 1972. She also contributed to the establishment of the Kyösti and Kalervo Kallio Museum in Nivala.

She died on 31 January 1995 in Nivala, at the age of 87. In 2017, the Oulu Southern Institute of the University of Oulu was renamed the Kerttu Saalasti Institute in her honor.

== See also ==
- List of Cabinet Ministers from Finland by ministerial portfolio
