= Kaisa Kallio =

Spouse of the President of Finland from 1937 to 1940

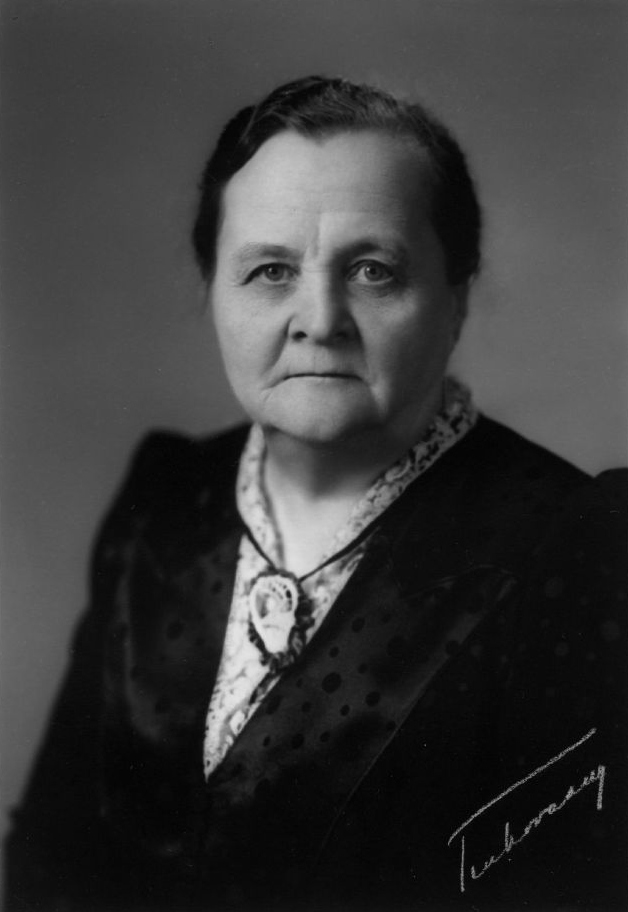
Kallio in the 1930s

Katariina "Kaisa" Kallio (née Nivala; 28 May 1878 – 25 November 1954) was a Finnish homemaker who was the spouse of the president of Finland from 1937 to 1940. She was married to Kyösti Kallio, the fourth president of Finland.

== Biography ==
Katariina Nivala was born on 28 May 1878 in Nivala, Finland. She was the daughter of a farmer. Nivala attended a folk high school in Haapavesi, where she met Kyösti Kallio, the head of the local youth organization. They married in 1902 and had six children, including future education minister Kerttu Saalasti. After marriage, she became the hostess of a farm in Nivala; while Kyösti became increasingly involved in politics, Kaisa frequently turned down appointments to local committees. They moved to the Presidential Palace in Helsinki when Kyösti was elected president in 1937. As spouse of the president, Kallio was involved with the Finnish Girl Guides and the Kalevala Women's League. After Kyösti Kallio's resignation due to poor health and his death in 1940, she moved back to Nivala to live with her granddaughter Tellervo.

On Kallio's 60th birthday in 1938, a civic gift fund was established in her honor, and she donated the proceeds to establish Kaisankoti, a rehabilitation centre for rural women. Kallio died on 25 November 1954 in Nivala, at the age of 76.
