= Anna-Liisa Linkola =

Finnish politician

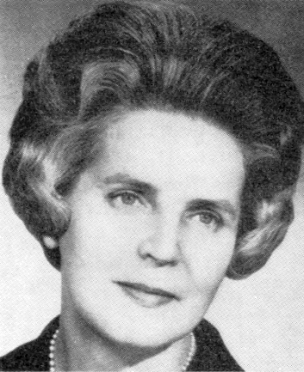

Member of the Parliament of Finland
- In office 1962–1979
- Constituency: Kymi

Second Deputy Speaker of the Parliament of Finland
- In office 1975–1978

Personal details
- Born: Anna-Liisa Korhonen; 10 August 1914 Pielisjärvi, Finland
- Died: 3 August 1999 (aged 84) Kotka, Finland
- Party: National Coalition Party
- Occupation: Politician, Teacher, Chemist

Anna-Liisa Linkola (née Korhonen, 10 August 1914 – 3 August 1999) was a Finnish politician. She was a member of the Parliament of Finland from 1962 to 1979. She represented the National Coalition Party.

Linkola was born in Pielisjärvi. Her parents were Master of Science (Technology, DI) Kaarlo Heikki Korhonen and Anna Maria Ryynänen. Linkola completed her master's studies in 1937, specialising later in water chemistry. She worked as a teacher at Kotka lyceum from 1951 to 1974 and at Kotka nursing school from 1957 to 1973. She also worked as a chemist at the city of Kotka waterworks from 1955 to 1971. She was a member of the Kotka town council and acted as the council's vice chairman.

Linkola was a member of the parliament from 1962 to 1979 representing Kymi electoral district. She was the first woman among the parliament's speakers when she acted as the second deputy speaker from 1975 to 1978. She was also a member of the supervisory board of Yleisradio. Linkola also acted as vice chairman of the National Coalition Party. She died in Kotka, aged 84.

== Sources ==
- Anna-Liisa Linkola Kansanedustajat. Parliament of Finland.
