= Paavo Virkkunen =

Finnish politician (1874–1959)

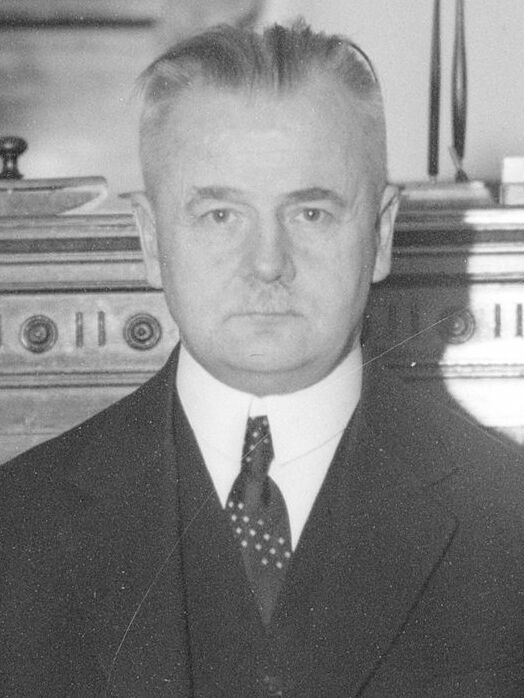
Paavo Virkkunen

Paavo Eemil Virkkunen (27 September 1874 – 13 July 1959) was a Finnish conservative politician.

Virkkunen was born in Pudasjärvi. He was a member of the Finnish Party and was elected in the parliament in 1913, but joined the National Coalition Party in 1918. He was five times the Speaker of the Parliament. He became the chairman of the party in 1932 following the six-year leadership of Kyösti Haataja.

He died in Pälkäne, aged 84, and is buried in the Hietaniemi Cemetery in Helsinki.

Political offices
| Preceded by Ernst Nevanlinna | Speaker of the Parliament of Finland; 1918 | Succeeded by Lauri Kristian Relander |
| Preceded by Wäinö Wuolijoki | Speaker of the Parliament of Finland; 1923 | Succeeded by Kyösti Kallio |
| Preceded by Wäinö Wuolijoki | Speaker of the Parliament of Finland; 1926 | Succeeded by Kyösti Kallio |
| Preceded by Kyösti Kallio | Speaker of the Parliament of Finland; 1928 | Succeeded by Kyösti Kallio |
| Preceded by Kyösti Kallio | Speaker of the Parliament of Finland; 1929-1930 | Succeeded by Juho Sunila |
