= Lex Kallio =

The Act on the acquisition of land for settlement purposes (Finnish: Laki maan hankkimisesta asutustarkoituksiin (278/1922)) or Lex Kallio was a 1922 Finnish law, nicknamed after its proponent Kyösti Kallio, who later served as the President of Finland. The key provision was in its section 2, where it was provided that the State and local authorities would facilitate the acquisition of land for Finnish citizens wishing to do so for the purposes of cultivation and residential settlement. The law was repealed in 1938.
