= Ernst Nevanlinna =

Finnish politician

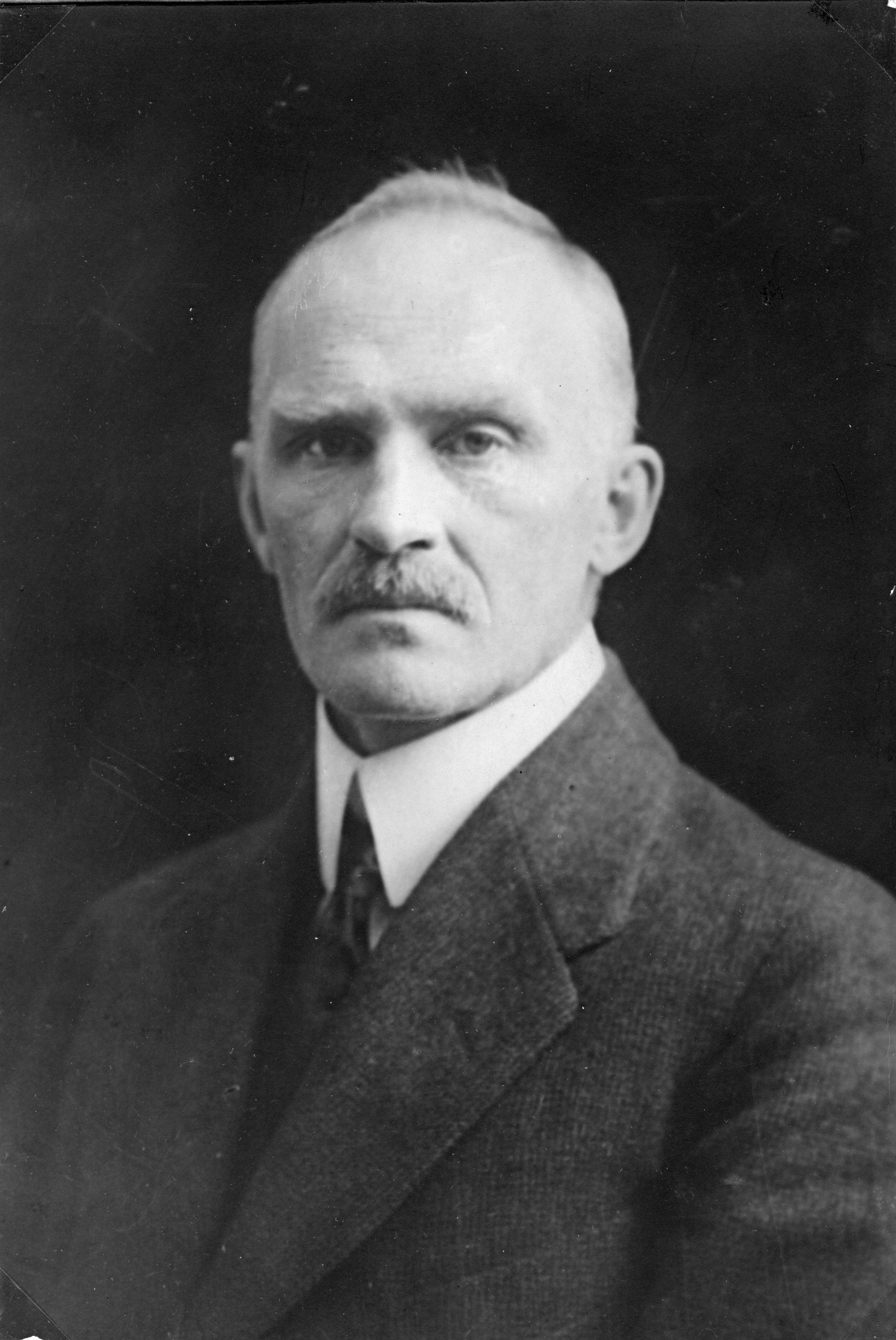
Ernst Nevanlinna.

Ernst Nevanlinna , originally Neovius, (10 May 1873 – 7 September 1932) was a Finnish politician. He was born in Pielisjärvi, Lieksa, and was professor of economics in the University of Turku and, from 1921 to 1922, editor in chief of Uusi Suomi daily newspaper. At the time, Uusi Suomi was the official newspaper of the conservative Finnish National Coalition Party.

He was a member of the Senate of Finland as well as of the parliament from 1907 to 1913 and from 1916 to 1922 and Speaker of the Parliament of Finland in 1918.

He died in Helsinki, aged 59, and is buried in the Hietaniemi Cemetery in Helsinki.

Political offices
Preceded by Lauri Ingman	Speaker of the Parliament of Finland; 1918	Succeeded by Paavo Virkkunen
