= Wäinö Wuolijoki =

Finnish politician (1872–1947)

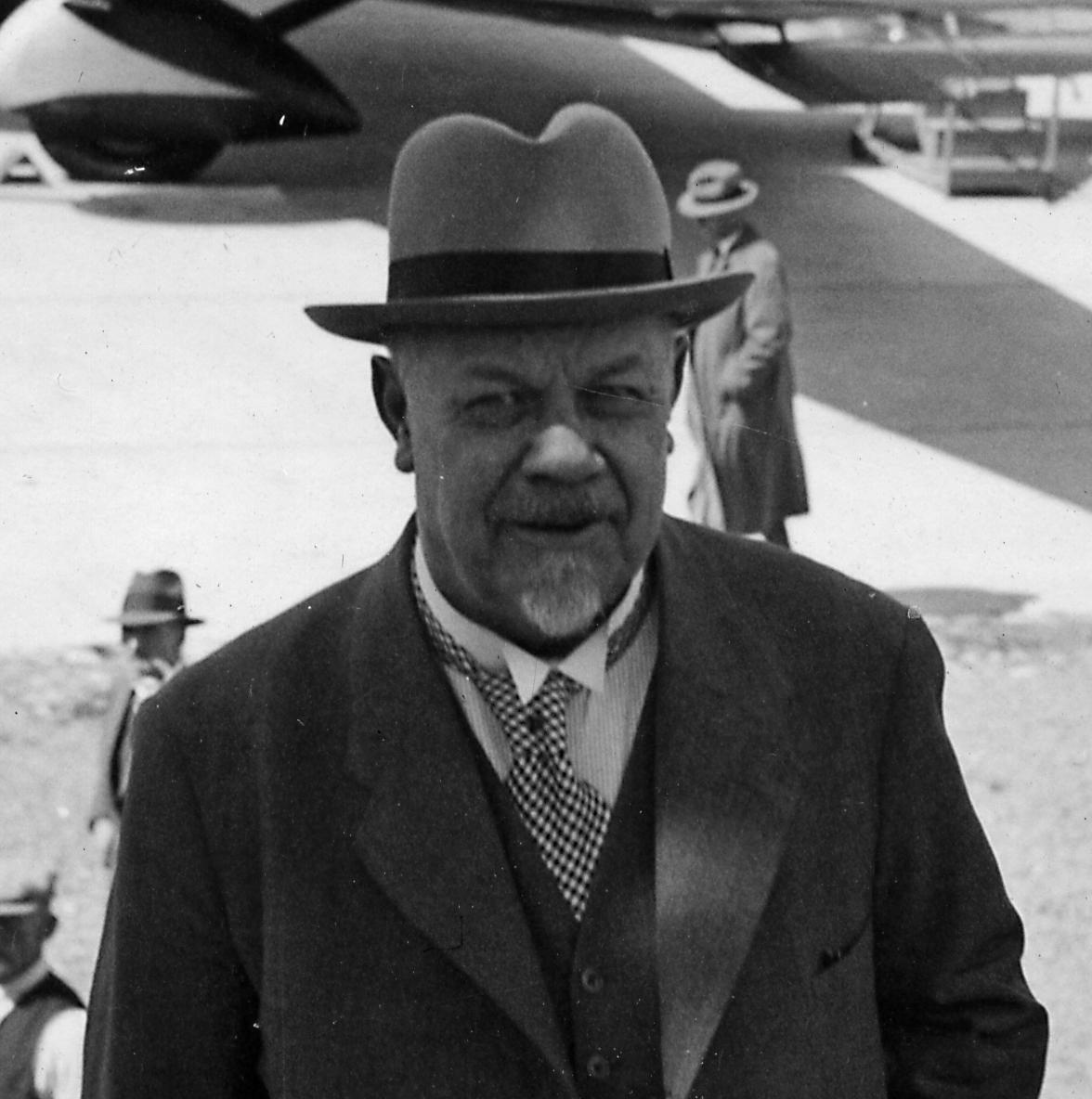
Wäinö Wuolijoki

Hugo Robert Wäinö Wuolijoki (14 December 1872 in Hauho – 12 December 1947 in Hauho) was a Finnish politician, an agronomist, a master of philosophy, a minister and a member of parliament.

== Career ==
Wuolijoki became an undergraduate in 1891, graduated as agronomist in 1896, Bachelor of Philosophy and Master of Science in 1900. The parents of Wuolijoki were Riding Farmer, or rider, Johan Robert Wuolijoki and Serafina Lagervik. His spouse was from 1911 Sylvia Adelaide Roschier. Wuolijoki's brother was a lawyer and politician Sulo Wuolijoki, whose spouse was a writer, politician and Hella Wuolijoki, general director of the Finnish Broadcasting Company.

Prior as Member of Parliament Wuolijoki worked as a teacher at the Mustiala Agricultural College in Häme in 1904–1905. During his first term of office, he served as a Harvester of Agriculture in 1906–1908.

Wuolijoki, a professor of mathematics, physics and chemistry in Helsinki, worked in 1908-1918 and as the second leader of Wholesale in 1922–1927.

Wuolijoki was a social democrat and he was a member of parliament. He was elected a member of Parliament from the southern constituency of Turku 1907–1909,

From the northern constituency of Häme County 1919-1921 and again from the southern constituency of Turku 1922–1926. He served as the Speaker of the Parliament in 1921-1922 and 1925; he was also the first Vice-President of Parliament in 1923 and the second Vice-Speaker 1924. He was a member of the committee in the Committee on Foreign Affairs and the Parliamentary Committee on Foreign Affairs, acting as Parliamentary Banking Ombudsman and the Bank of Finland's auditor.

Wuolijoki was a member of the Senate Finance Department on 23 March 1917 - 31 July 1917. He served as Minister of Transport and Public Works in the minority Government of Väinö Tanner on 13 December 1926 to 15 November 1927.

After the end of the ministerial term, in the government of Väinö Tanner, Wuolijoki embarked on a diplomat. He served as Envoy of Finland to Berlin and Vienna from 1927 to 1933, in Oslo from 1933 to 1940 and in The Hague from 1933 to 1938.

Wuolijoki worked as a farmer in his home farm Hauho from 1911 to 1947 and a shorter period in Hyvinkää from 1918 to 1922.

== Honors ==
In 1942, Wäinö Wuolijoki received a special ambassador and plenipotentiary of the honorary title granted by the President of the Republic.

Political offices
Preceded by Kyösti Kallio	Speaker of the Parliament of Finland; 1921	Succeeded by Kyösti Kallio
Preceded by Kyösti Kallio	Speaker of the Parliament of Finland; 1922	Succeeded by Paavo Virkkunen
Preceded by Kyösti Kallio	Speaker of the Parliament of Finland; 1925	Succeeded by Paavo Virkkunen
