= Väinö Hakkila =

Finnish politician (1882–1958)

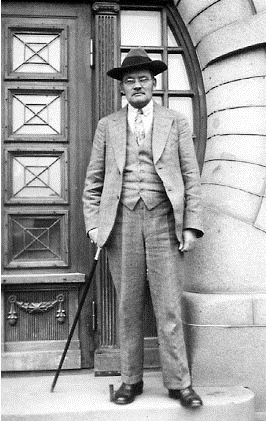
- Born: Väinö Pietari Hakkila; 29 June 1882; Lempäälä, Grand Duchy of Finland
- Died: 18 July 1958 (aged 76); Orivesi, Finland
- Occupation: Politician
- Known for: Being kidnapped by the Lapua Movement in July 1930

Väinö Pietari Hakkila (29 June 1882, in Lempäälä – 18 July 1958, in Orivesi) was a Finnish politician from Social Democratic Party of Finland.

Hakkila was elected into Parliament for terms of 1919–1945 and 1948–1958. He was deputy speaker from 1929 to 1932 and speaker of the Parliament from 1936 to 1945, including wartime period. He was Minister of Justice in the Tanner Cabinet from 1926 to 1927 and the first Social Democratic municipality mayor of Tampere for more than thirty years, 1920–1952.

Hakkila, as one of the victims of Lapua Movement, was kidnapped and beaten in July 1930.

== See also ==
- List of kidnappings

Political offices
| Preceded by Kyösti Kallio | Speaker of the Parliament of Finland; 1936–1945 | Succeeded by Karl-August Fagerholm |
