= Juuso Häikiö =

Finnish jurist, military officer and politician (1917–2003)

Member of Parliament

Personal details
- Born: 2 March 1917 Muhos, Finland
- Died: 5 December 2003 (aged 86) Kuopio
- Party: National Coalition Party
- Education: University of Helsinki

Military service
- Allegiance: Finland
- Branch/service: Finnish Army

Juuso Häikiö (2 March 1917 – 5 December 2003) was a Finnish jurist, military officer and politician, born in Muhos. He was a member of the Parliament of Finland from 1962 to 1983, representing the National Coalition Party. He was a presidential elector in the 1968, 1978 and 1982 presidential elections.

== Biography ==
Häikiö was born on 2 March 1917 in Muhos, Finland. His parents were farmer Iivari Häikiö and housewife Henrika Heikkinen. He graduated from the Oulun Lyseo Upper Secondary School in 1935 and graduated from National Defence University in 1939. During World War II, Juuso Häikiö was a junior officer and platoon leader in 1939, company commander in 1939–1941 and battalion commander in 1941–1944.

After World War II, he completed a higher law degree at the University of Helsinki in 1947 and received the rank of deputy judge in 1950. After completing his studies in law, Häikiö was initially an assistant at the Mäntyharju court in 1948 and a notary at the Mikkeli court in 1949. He worked as a bailiff at the Court of Appeal of Eastern Finland in Kuopio in 1950–1957, as a secretary 1957–1958, as a lower-ranking appellate court advisor in 1958–1962, and from 1962 as a higher-ranking appellate court advisor.

Häikiö was a Member of Parliament from 1962 to 1983 from the parliamentary district of Kuopio, now Northern Savonia. He was the second deputy speaker of the parliament in 1979–1983 and chaired the inheritance law committee in 1964 and the constitutional law committee in 1966–1978. Häikiö was a member of the Supreme Court from 1974 to 1986. He served as the vice-chairman of the parliamentary group of the coalition and as the chairman of the development committee for the parliamentary procedure in 1968–1969 and as the chairman of the constitutional committee in 1970–1974.

Häikiö was married three times and was widowed twice. He had four children from his first marriage and two from his second. The first spouse was English and Swedish lecturer Helena Maria Jauhiainen 1942–1965, the second pharmacist Pirkko Inkeri Pasanen (formerly Lappalainen) 1968–1984, and the third spouse from 1985 accountant Eeva Kaarina Peltomäki. His children include historian Martti Häikiö and playwright Kristiina Lyytinen.

Häikiö was the president's elector in the presidential elections of 1968, 1978 and 1982 and he was a member of the Kuopio city council and the chairman of the Kuopio city council. He died in Kuopio on December 5, 2003.
