= Tanner cabinet =

14th government of Finland

Tanner Cabinet
- 14th Cabinet of Finland
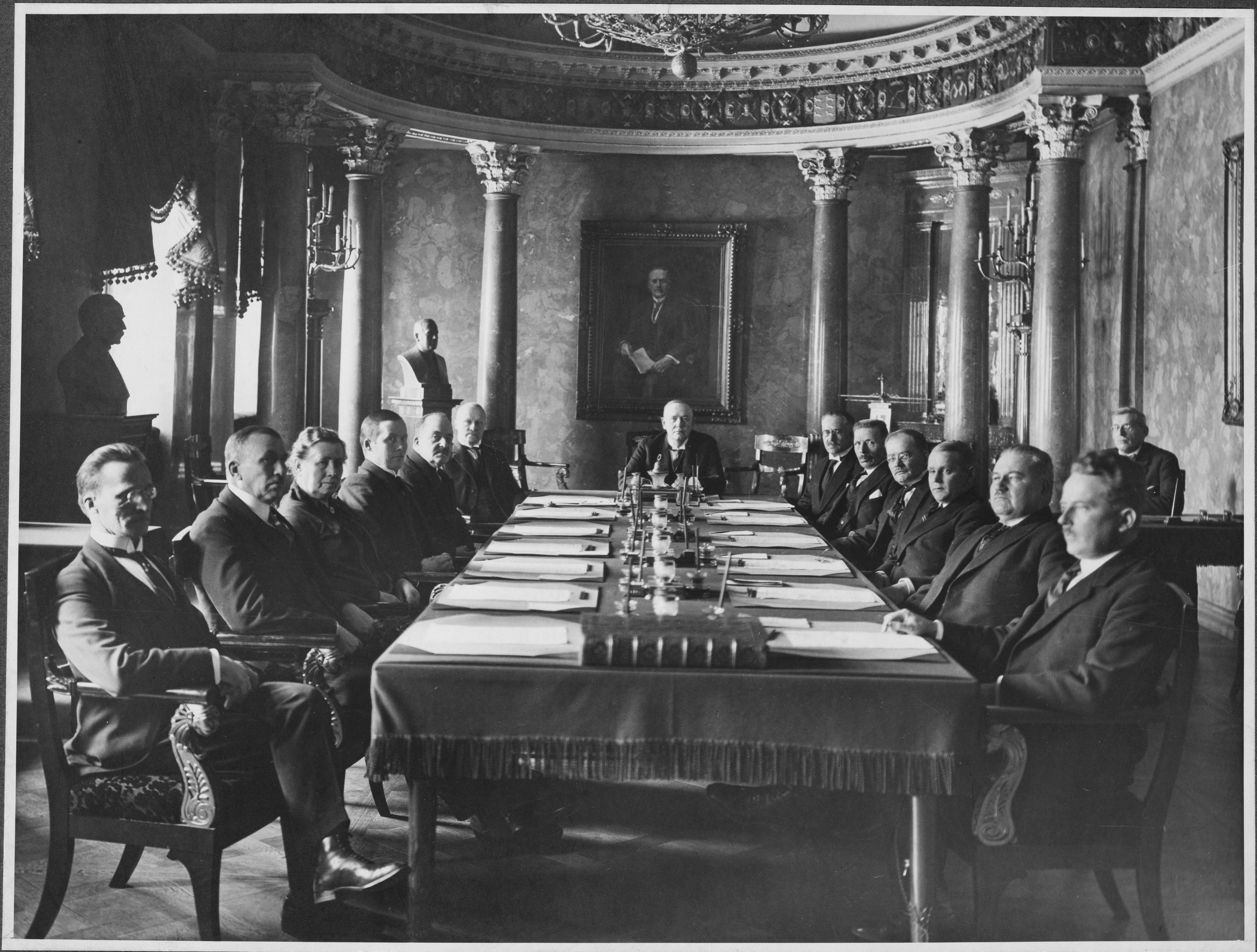
- Date formed: 13 December 1926
- Date dissolved: 17 December 1927

People and organisations
- President: Lauri Kristian Relander
- Prime Minister: Väinö Tanner
- Total no. of members: 13
- Member party: Social Democrats
- Status in legislature: Minority government

History
- Predecessor: Kallio II
- Successor: Sunila I

Väinö Tanner's cabinet was the 14th government of Finland, which existed from 13 December 1926 to 17 December 1927. It was a minority government led by Social Democratic Prime Minister Väinö Tanner. The cabinet's Deputy Minister of Social affairs, Miina Sillanpää, was the first female minister in Finnish history.

== Ministers ==
Portfolio	Minister	Took office	Left office	Party
Prime Minister	Väinö Tanner	13 December 1926	17 December 1927	SDP
Minister for Foreign Affairs	Väinö Voionmaa	13 December 1926	17 December 1927	SDP
Minister of Justice	Väinö Hakkila	13 December 1926	17 December 1927	SDP
Minister of Defence	Kaarlo Heinonen	13 December 1926	17 December 1927	SDP
Minister of the Interior	Rieti Itkonen	13 December 1926	12 April 1927	SDP
Minister of the Interior	Olavi Puro	29 April 1927	17 December 1927	SDP
Minister of Finance	Hannes Ryömä	13 December 1926	17 December 1927	SDP
Minister of Education	Julius Ailio	13 December 1926	17 December 1927	SDP
Minister of Agriculture	Mauno Pekkala	13 December 1926	17 December 1927	SDP
Minister of Transport and Public Works	Wäinö Wuolijoki	13 December 1926	15 November 1927	SDP
Minister of Transport and Public Works	Johan Helo	15 December 1927	17 December 1927	SDP
Minister of Trade and Industry	Väinö Hupli	13 December 1926	17 December 1927	SDP
Minister of Social Affairs	Johan Helo	13 December 1926	15 November 1927	SDP
Minister of Social Affairs	Matti Paasivuori	15 November 1927	17 December 1927	SDP
Deputy Minister of Social Affairs	Miina Sillanpää	13 December 1926	17 December 1927	SDP
Minister without portfolio	Matti Paasivuori	13 December 1926	17 December 1927	SDP

Preceded by Kallio II	Government of Finland; 13 December 1926–17 December 1927	Succeeded by Sunila I
