= Emil Schybergson =

Finnish jurist, bank director and politician (1856–1920)

Ernst Emil Schybergson
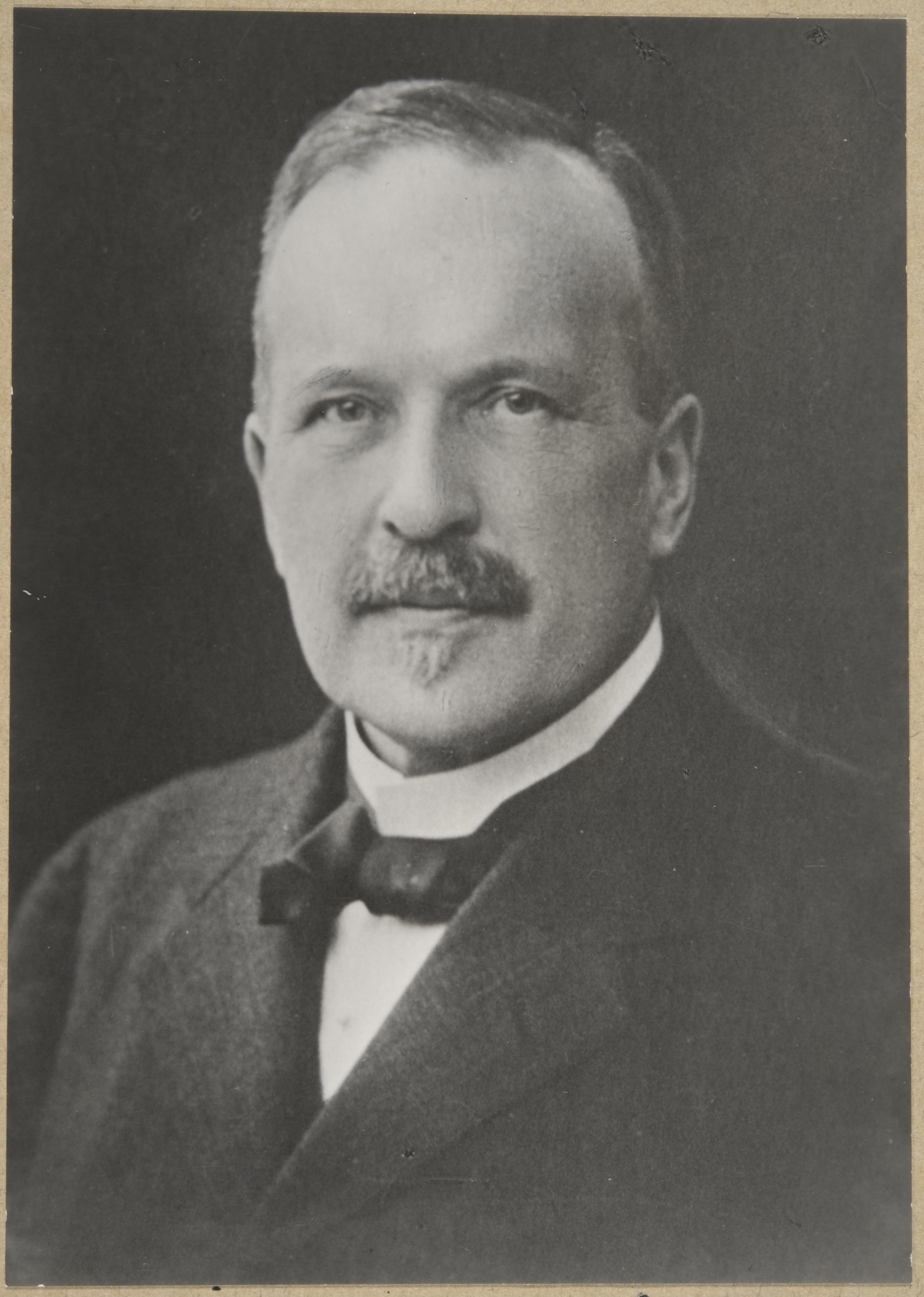
- Born: 6 January 1856; Turku, Kingdom of Sweden
- Died: 6 March 1920 (aged 64); Helsinki, Finland
- Occupations: Jurist, bank director, politician
- Spouse: Hildegard Anna Vilhelmina Antell (m. 1886)

Ernst Emil Schybergson (6 January 1856 – 7 March 1920) was a Finnish jurist, bank director and politician, born in Turku. He was a member of the Diet of Finland from 1885 to 1906 and a member of the Parliament of Finland from 1907–to 1919, representing the Swedish People's Party of Finland (SFP). Schybergson committed suicide in 1920 after the bank he was leading got into financial difficulties he was unable to solve.

== Biography ==
Schybergson's parents were Arvid Magnus Schybergson och Amanda Avellan. His brothers, the lawyer Gustaf Arvid and the historian Magnus Gottfrid, were also well known. He graduated with a Master of Arts in 1877 and became a Varatuomari in 1887. He worked at the Bank of Finland from 1877 to 1890, as an attorney general (Finnish: Oikeusneuvosmies) from 1890 to 1896 and acted as chairman of Jockis Gods Ab and director of Helsingin Kansanpankki from 1893. In 1896, with the help of Knut Agathon Wallenberg, he transformed Helsingin Kansanpankki into a new company, Privatbanken i Helsingfors (later fused with Yhdyspankki). In 1906 he was appointed chairman and CEO of Suomen Hypoteekkiyhdistys.

Schybergson was politically active in the constitutional resistance to the Russification. Among other things, he was among those who petitioned the Emperor following the Cossack riots in Helsinki in 1902, which probably contributed to his arrest in June 1904 and exile to Nizhny Novgorod. Upon returning to Finland, he had lost his position at Privatbanken i Helsingfors.

He was a member of the Diet of Finland in 1885, 1888, 1894, 1897, 1899, 1900 and from 1905 to 1906, as a member of the Burgher class, and of the Parliament of Finland from 1907 to 1909 and from 1910 to 1919, as a representative of the Swedish People's Party. In the unicameral Parliament, he was chairman of the banking committee from 1907 to 1917 and deputy speaker at the Parliament in 1913 and 1918. As second deputy speaker, he was part of the delegation that went to Germany in the autumn of 1918 to formally invite the newly elected King Frederick Charles of Hesse to take office.

In addition to his banking and political duties, Schybergson was involved in the development of Brändö villastad, a villa suburb east of Helsinki, including by reorganizing the company AB Brändö Villastad's finances and working for a ferry connection and later a bridge to Sörnäinen. He was a prolific writer on economic and social topics and founded two short-lived newspapers, Tidning för Finlands handel och industri in the 1880s and Aftonposten in the 1890s.

Schybergson committed suicide in 1920 after large foreign loans taken out during and after the First World War, combined with the sharp fall in the value of markka, created an unsustainable situation for Suomen Hypoteekkiyhdistys.

Schybergson married Hildegard Anna Vilhelmina Antell in 1886.
