= Rieti Itkonen =

Finnish lawyer, journalist and politician (1889–1951)

Rieti (Fredrik Wilhelm) Itkonen (5 March 1889, Lappeenranta - 1 July 1951) was a Finnish lawyer, journalist and politician. He was a member of the Social Democratic Party of Finland. He served as Minister of the Interior in Väinö Tanner's cabinet (13 December 1926 - 12 April 1927) and as a Member of Parliament (1 April 1919 - 31 July 1929).
