= Arvo Inkilä =

Finnish educator and politician (1881–1965)

Arvo Verner Oskar Inkilä (11 October 1881 – 8 September 1965; surname until 1906 Mannelin) was a Finnish educator and politician, born in Huittinen. He began his political career in the Young Finnish Party. He was a member of the Parliament of Finland from 1933 to 1939, representing the National Progressive Party. After the National Progressive Party ceased to exist in 1951, he joined the Liberal League. He was a presidential elector in the 1937, 1940 and 1943 presidential elections.
