= Lennart Heljas =

Finnish politician

President of the Nordic Council
- In office 1 January 1957 – 31 December 1957
- Preceded by: Erik Eriksen
- Succeeded by: Nils Hønsvald

Minister of Education
- In office 17 March 1950 – 20 September 1951
- Prime Minister: Urho Kekkonen
- Preceded by: Reino Oittinen
- Succeeded by: Reino Oittinen
- In office 26 May 1948 – 29 July 1948
- Prime Minister: Mauno Pekkala
- Preceded by: Eino Kilpi
- Succeeded by: Reino Oittinen

Minister of Social Affairs
- In office 26 March 1946 – 26 May 1948
- Prime Minister: Mauno Pekkala
- Preceded by: Matti Janhunen
- Succeeded by: Onni Peltonen

Member of the Finnish Parliament
- In office 1 September 1939 – 21 July 1958
- Constituency: Kuopio County

Personal details
- Born: Lennart Albert Heljas; 13 May 1896 Vyborg, Russia
- Died: 8 March 1972 (aged 75) Kuopio, Finland
- Party: Centre

Lennart Albert Heljas (13 May 1896 – 9 March 1972) was a Finnish politician of the Centre Party, cabinet minister and Lutheran priest. He served as a member of the Parliament of Finland from 1939 to 1958, and was vice president of the parliament in 1946, 1954–1956 and in 1957. He served as Minister of Social Affairs from 1946 to 1948 and as Minister of Education in 1948 and from 1950 to 1951. He served as President of the Nordic Council in 1957.
