= Pekka Ahmavaara =

Finnish bank director and politician

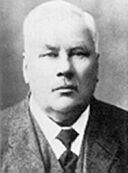
- Born: Pekka Aulin; 28 October 1862; Ylitornio, Lapland, Finland
- Died: 26 December 1929 (aged 67); Oulu
- Occupations: bank director, politician
- Years active: 1905–1925

Pekka Ahmavaara (28 October 1862 – 26 December 1929; surname until 1906 Aulin) was a Finnish bank director and politician. He was born in Ylitornio, and was a member of the Diet of Finland from 1894 to 1906 and of the Parliament of Finland from 1907 to 1916 and again from 1917 to 1919. He represented the Young Finnish Party until 1918 and the National Coalition Party from 1918 to 1919.

Nikolay Bobrikov's government exiled him to Sweden during the first wave of Russification in 1903. He was allowed to return in 1905.

In 1924–1925 he was a member of the city council of Oulu. In 1925 he was a member of electoral college, which elected president of Finland.

He was also a president of the Economic Society of the Oulu Province (predecessor of the ProAgria Oulu Maaseutukeskus ry). He died in Oulu, aged 67.
