= Martti Häikiö =

Finnish historian and writer (1949–2025)

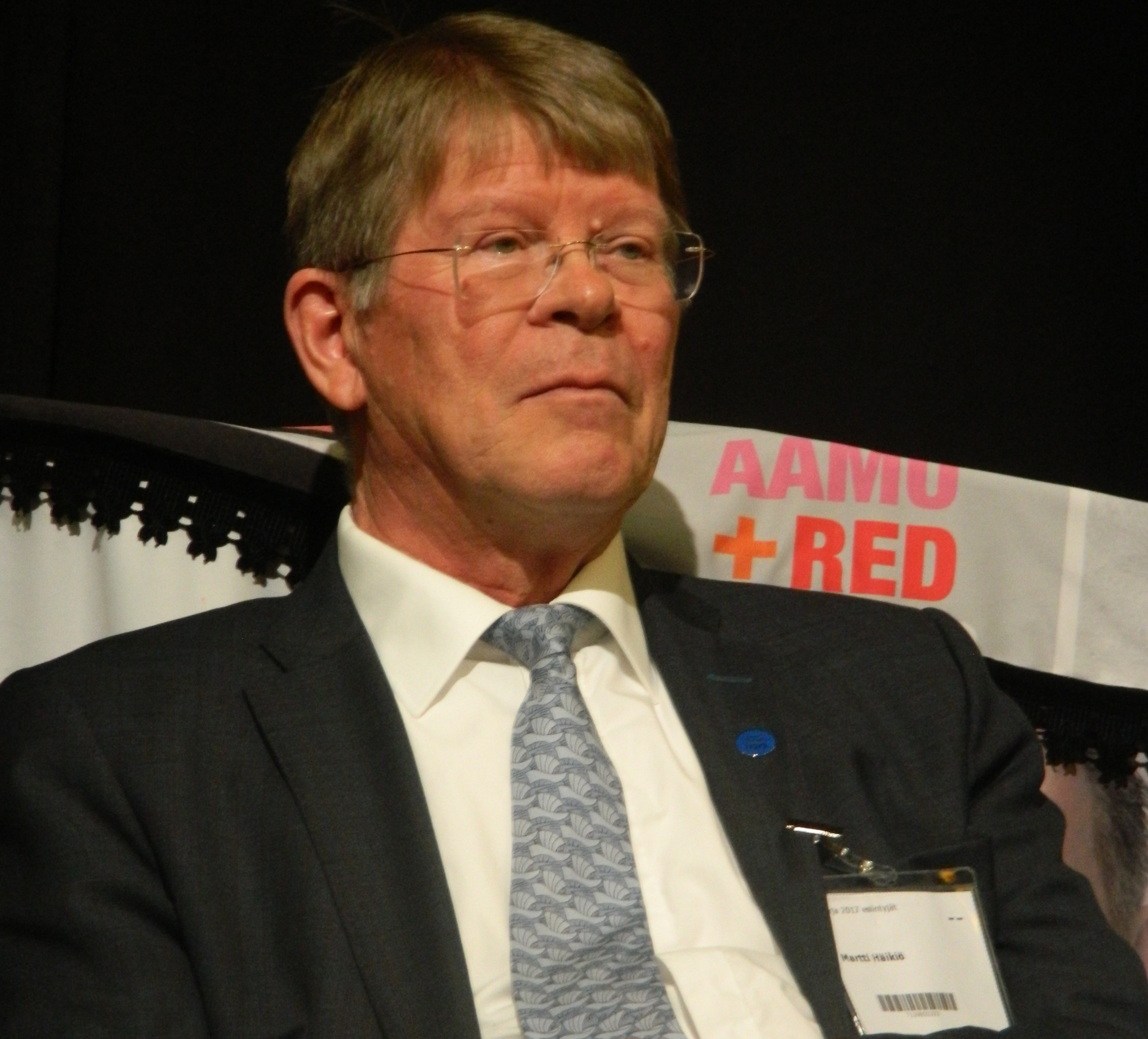
Häikiö in 2017

Martti Johannes Häikiö (1 October 1949 – 7 February 2025) was a Finnish historian and writer. In 1978, Häikiö became an associate professor in political history at Helsinki University. He was also editor in chief and columnist in many journals and newspapers.

Häikiö was born in Mikkeli on 1 October 1949. His doctoral dissertation concerns the British politics on Finland before and during the Winter War and has thereafter published a lot of popular works on modern Finnish history and corporate history, such as Nokia, the inside story (2002).

Häikiö died on 7 February 2025, at the age of 75.

== Sources ==
- Uppslagsverket Finland, 2 (2004)
