= Kivijärvi =

- Municipality
- Kivijärven kunta Kivijärvi kommun
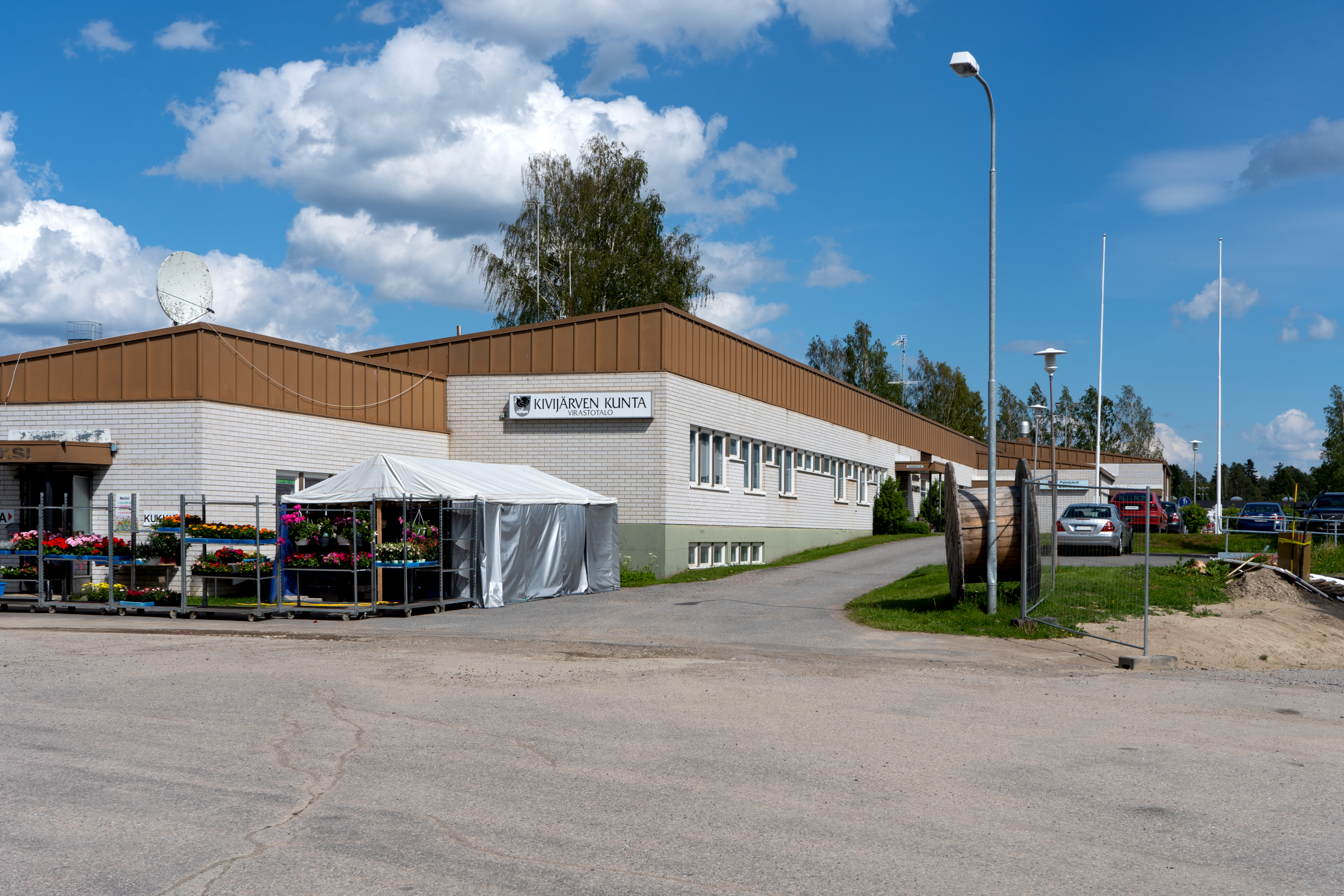
- Kivijärvi municipal office

- Coat of arms

- Location of Kivijärvi in Finland
- Interactive map of Kivijärvi
- Coordinates: 63°07.2′N 025°04.5′E
- Country: Finland
- Region: Central Finland
- Sub-region: Saarijärvi–Viitasaari sub-region
- Charter: 1868

Government
  - Municipal manager: Pekka Helppikangas

Area (2018-01-01)
  - Total: 599.88 km^{2} (231.61 sq mi)
  - Land: 483.96 km^{2} (186.86 sq mi)
  - Water: 115.81 km^{2} (44.71 sq mi)
  - Rank: 178th largest in Finland

Population (2025-12-31)
  - Total: 1,001
  - Rank: 291st largest in Finland
  - Density: 2.07/km^{2} (5.4/sq mi)

Population by native language
  - Finnish: 98.5% (official)
  - Others: 1.5%

Population by age
  - 0 to 14: 13.2%
  - 15 to 64: 48%
  - 65 or older: 38.8%
- Time zone: UTC+02:00 (EET)
  - Summer (DST): UTC+03:00 (EEST)
- Website: www.kivijarvi.fi

Kivijärvi (Finnish pronunciation: [ˈkiʋiˌjærʋi]; literally "stone(y) lake") is a municipality of Finland. It is located in the Central Finland region. The municipality has a population of 1,001 (31 December 2025) and covers an area of 599.88 square kilometres (231.61 sq mi) of which 115.81 km^{2} (44.71 sq mi) is water. The population density is 2.07 inhabitants per square kilometre (5.4/sq mi).

Neighbouring municipalities are Kannonkoski, Karstula, Kinnula, Kyyjärvi, Perho and Viitasaari. The municipality is unilingually Finnish.

The municipal coat of arms of Kivijärvi is inspired by a folktale related to Kivijärvi's church. According to the story, the construction work of the first church building did not progress when all the work done during the day was mysteriously destroyed during the night. In that case, it was decided that the site of the church would be chosen by putting a rooster on the back of the lake to drift on top of the bottom log of the church, and where the rooster would land, the church of parish would be erected there. The coat of arms was designed by Gustaf von Numers and was approved for use on April 18, 1963.

== Nature ==
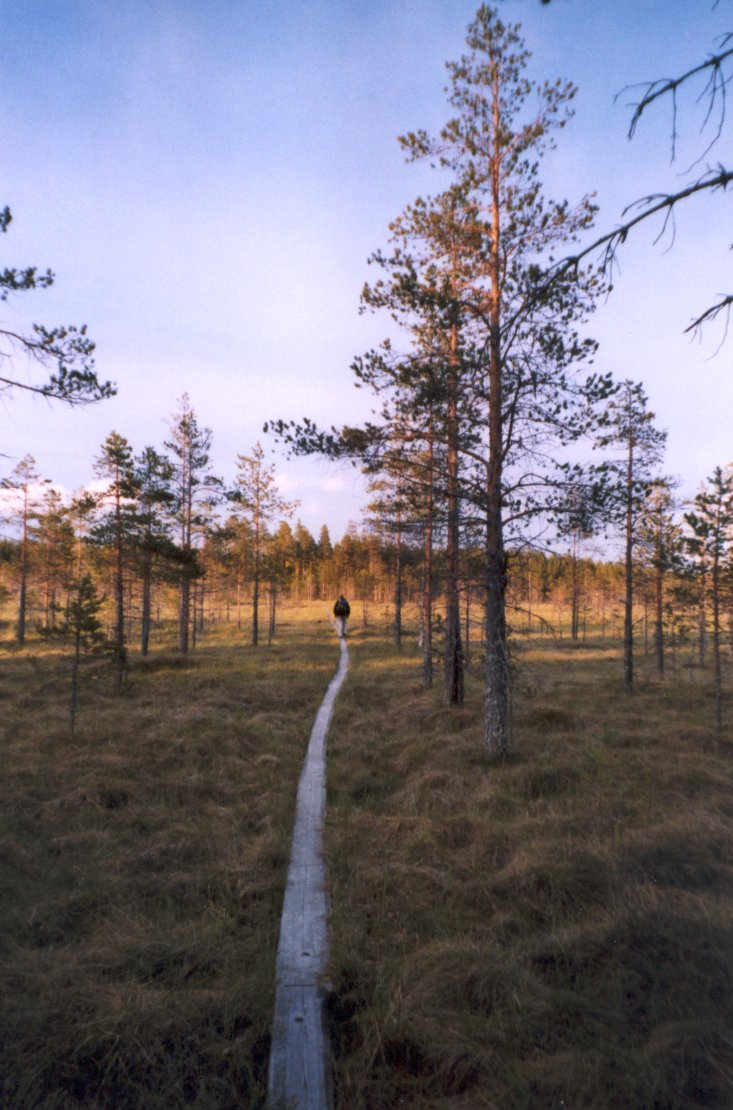
Salamajärvi National Park

There are all together 89 lakes in Kivijärvi. The biggest lakes are Kivijärvi, Heitjärvi and Heikinjärvi. Salamajärvi National Park is partly located in Kivijärvi.

== History ==
The toponym was first mentioned in 1554 as Kijuijerffuj ärmarch, referring to hunting grounds held by Tavastians. The village of Kivijärvi has existed at least since 1571, when it was a part of the large Rautalampi parish. It was transferred to the Viitasaari parish after its establishment in 1628. Kivijärvi became a chapel community in 1750 and fully independent from Viitasaari in 1864. Kinnula was separated from Kivijärvi in 1904, though it had had its own church since 1867. In 1934, parts of Kivijärvi and Viitasaari were separated in order to form the Kannonkoski municipality.

=== Suomenselkä municipality ===
Kannonkoski, Karstula, Kivijärvi and Kyyjärvi planned to merge into the Suomenselkä municipality from January 1, 2022. Karstula, Kivijärvi and Kyyjärvi accepted the merger proposal, but Kannonkoski did not. After Kannonkoski left the planned merger, Kivijärvi also left it. Later, the merger project of the remaining Karstula and Kyyjärvi also failed at the Kyyjärvi municipal council meeting held on May 17, 2021, and the Ministry of Finance does not propose a forced merger either.

== Surnames ==
Most common surnames and their frequencies in Kivijärvi as of 2014:

1. Kinnunen (1:18)
2. Kotilainen (1:24)
3. Hakkarainen (1:26)
4. Leppänen (1:26)
5. Kainulainen (1:29)
6. Piispanen (1:33)
7. Paananen (1:38)
8. Hytönen (1:42)
9. Holm (1:44)
10. Puranen (1:46)

== Notable people ==
- Jalmari Haapanen (1882–1961)
- Vihtori Vesterinen (1885–1958)
- Jussi Raatikainen (1898–1978)
- Jukka Sipilä (1936–2004)
- Anna-Liisa Kasurinen (born 1940)
- Zaida Bergroth (born 1977)
