= Finnish national road 77 =

Road in Finland

Highway 77
- Kantatie 77 (Finnish); Stamväg 77 (Swedish)
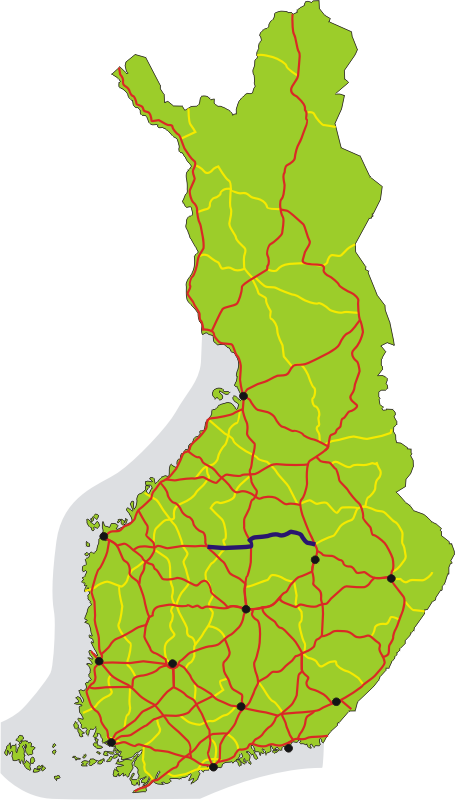

Route information
- Maintained by the Finnish Transport Agency
- Length: 182 km (113 mi)
- Existed: 1986–present

Major junctions
- From: Kyyjärvi
- To: Siilinjärvi

Location
- Country: Finland
- Major cities: Viitasaari

Highway system
- Highways in Finland
← Kt 76	→ Kt 78

The Finnish national road 77 (Finnish: Kantatie 77; Swedish: Stamväg 77) is the main road from Kyyjärvi to Siilinjärvi via Viitasaari. The road is 182 kilometres (113 mi) long and is part of the Blue Highway. Together with Highway 16 and the eastern section of Highway 9, it forms a transversal route across Finland. The road is two-lane in its entirety and has varying levels of traffic volume. The idea of converting the main road into a highway has been proposed several times.

== History ==
In the 1938 numbering system, main road 77 ran between Oulu and Kajaani, which initially ran south of the Oulujoki. In the 1950s, the route was moved to the north of the river. When the route south of the river was improved in the 1970s, it was renamed Highway 22 and main road 77 was decommissioned. The former main road 77, which ran to the north of the river, was redesignated to regional road 830 and is now access road 8300.

The road between Siilinjärvi and Viitasaari was completed in the mid-1970s, and the road was originally numbered as regional road 557. The road between Viitasaari and Kyyjärvi was finally completed in 1986, when the entire section was named main road 77.

The road, especially on the 22-kilometer section between Taimoniemi and Keitele, has been too narrow, winding, hilly and in poor condition for the traffic volume and road grade. There have been few overtaking opportunities, poor lighting and many dangerous intersections on the section. Road improvement work began in the summer of 2015 and it was completed in the summer of 2017.

== Route ==
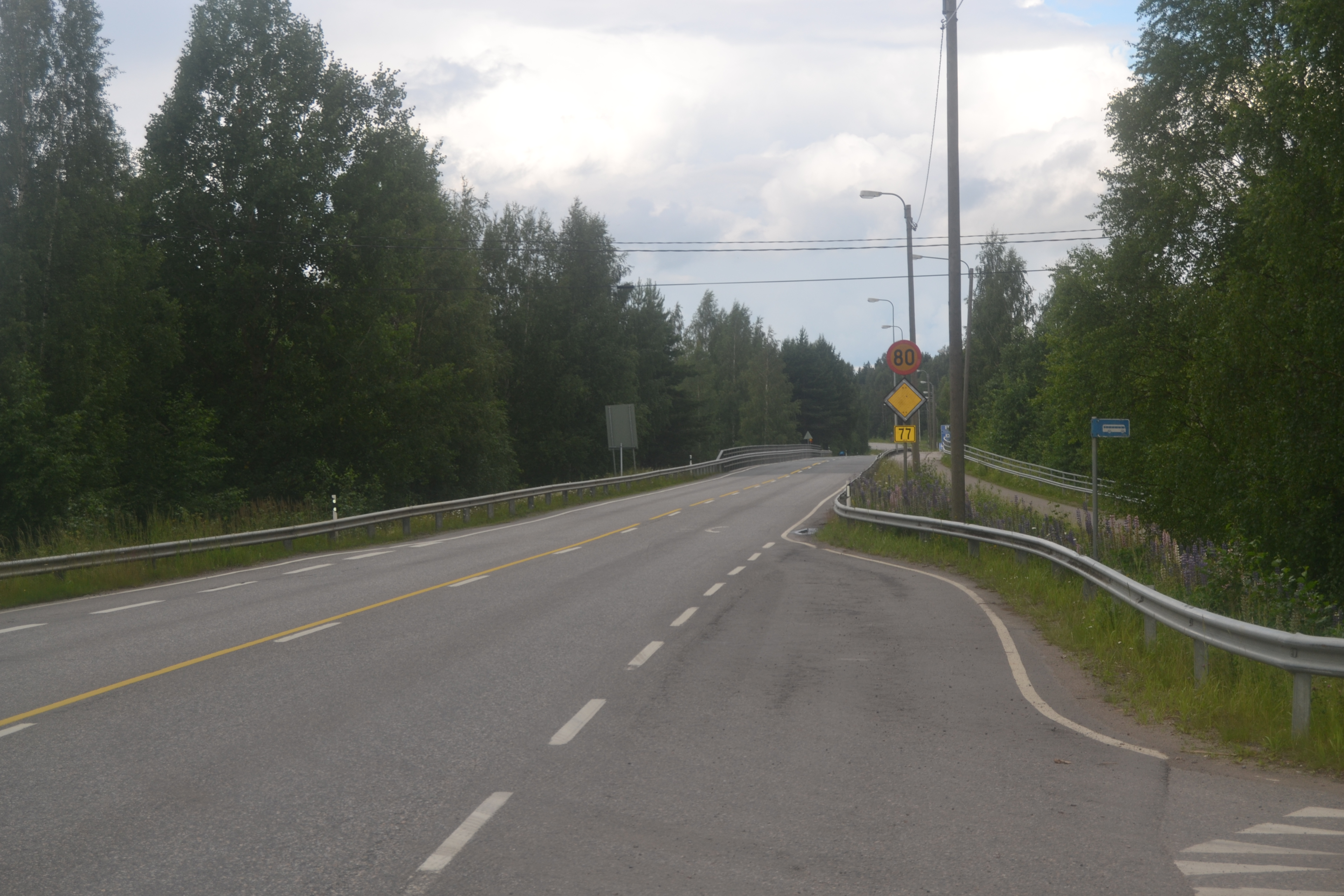
Main route 77 in Pielavesi

The road passes through the following localities:

- Kyyjärvi (Oikari)
- Karstula (Oinoskylä)
- Kivijärvi (Sompala)
- Kannonkoski (Piispala and Vihtasalmi)
- Viitasaari (Huopana, Viitasaari, Taimoniemi and Kumpumäki)
- Keitele
- Pielavesi (Säviä)
- Kuopio (Tuovilanlahti and Maaninka)
- Siilinjärvi
