= Blue Highway (tourist route) =

Tourist route in Northern Europe

Route information
- Length: 1,800 km (1,100 mi)

Major junctions
- Northwest end: Mo i Rana
- East end: Pudozh

Location
- Countries: Norway, Sweden, Finland, Russia
- Major cities: Mo i Rana, Storuman, Lycksele, Umeå, Vaasa, Lapua, Viitasaari, Kuopio, Joensuu, Tohmajärvi, Pryazha, Petrozavodsk

Highway system
- International E-road network; A Class; B Class

Blue Highway (Norwegian: Blå vegen, Swedish: Blå vägen, Finnish: Sininen tie, Russian: Голубая дорога) is an international tourist route from Norway via Sweden and Finland to Russia.

== Sights ==
The Blue Highway follows the ancient waterways from the Atlantic Ocean to Lake Onega. There are numerous lakes and rivers by the road. Vast areas of taiga forest dominate the landscape, and a section of the Scandinavian Mountains in Norway and western Sweden.

There are rural villages as well as cities and towns by the Blue Highway.

Country	Region	Sight
Norway	Nordland	Atlantic Ocean; Mo i Rana, a town near the Arctic Circle; Svartisen, the second largest glacier on the Norwegian mainland
Sweden	Västerbotten County	Storuman, with ski resorts (Hemavan, Tärnaby), the Alpine Botanical Garden (in Hemavan), Vindelfjällen Nature Centre (in Hemavan), Stensele Church (the largest wooden church in Sweden); The Museum of Forestry, in Lycksele; Lycksele Zoo, the northernmost zoological garden in Sweden; Umeå, capital of Västerbotten County on the Ume River
Finland	Ostrobothnia	Vaasa, capital of Ostrobothnia; Kvarken, Unesco World Heritage Site; Replot Bridge, Finland's second longest bridge
Finland	Southern Ostrobothnia	Alajärvi, architect Alvar Aalto's first and last public buildings
Finland	Central Finland	Huopanankoski, one of the oldest fishing rapids in Finland with cultural heritage landscape, located in Huopana, Viitasaari
Finland	Northern Savonia	Lakeland, networks of thousands of lakes separated by hilly forested countryside Lepikon torppa (Lepikko torp) in Pielavesi, a birthplace of Urho Kekkonen, a former President of Finland; Kolu Channel in Tervo, the longest inland water channel in Finland; Korkeakoski, the longest waterfall in Finland, located in Maaninka; Kuopio, the capital of Northern Savonia by the Kallavesi Lake; Puijo, recreation area, skijumping hill, tower Tahkovuori, tourist centre by the Lake Syväri; Ohtaansalmi, Treaty of Teusina boundary mark by the Rikkavesi Lake
Finland	North Karelia	Lakeland, networks of thousands of lakes separated by hilly forested countryside Outokumpu, mine museum with tunnel, train and tower Joensuu, capital of North Karelia on the Pielisjoki River; Pyhäselkä Lake, the northernmost part of the Saimaa lake system
Russia	Republic of Karelia	Lake Ladoga, the largest lake in Europe; Valaam, monastery in Valaam archipelago Petrozavodsk, capital of Republic of Karelia; Kizhi, Unesco World Heritage Site; Lake Onega, the second largest lake in Europe; Kondopoga, Martsialnye vody (Marcial Spa) - the oldest Russian spa, Kivach Nature Reserve; Medvezhyegorsk, i.a. military history tourist attractions, Sandarmokh - the site of mass shootings and burials of victims of Soviet political repressions, White Sea – Baltic Sea Canal ("the Stalin Canal"); Pudozh, Vodlozersky National Park and Onega petroglyphs (rock engravings)

== The Development of the Blue Highway ==
- The idea of a road across Northern Europe was born in the 1950s
- The Blue Highway Association was formed in Sweden in 1963
- Year-round ferry service between Umeå and Vaasa in 1972
- The Blue Highway became a European Highway in 1973
- A cross-border public bus route between Mo i Rana and Umeå was established in 1989 (service withdrawn in 2014 between Mo i Rana and Hemavan)
- Border crossing (Niirala/Vyartsilya) with Russia was opened in 1990
- The Blue Road Highway extended to Pudozh, Russia, in 2000

== Gallery ==
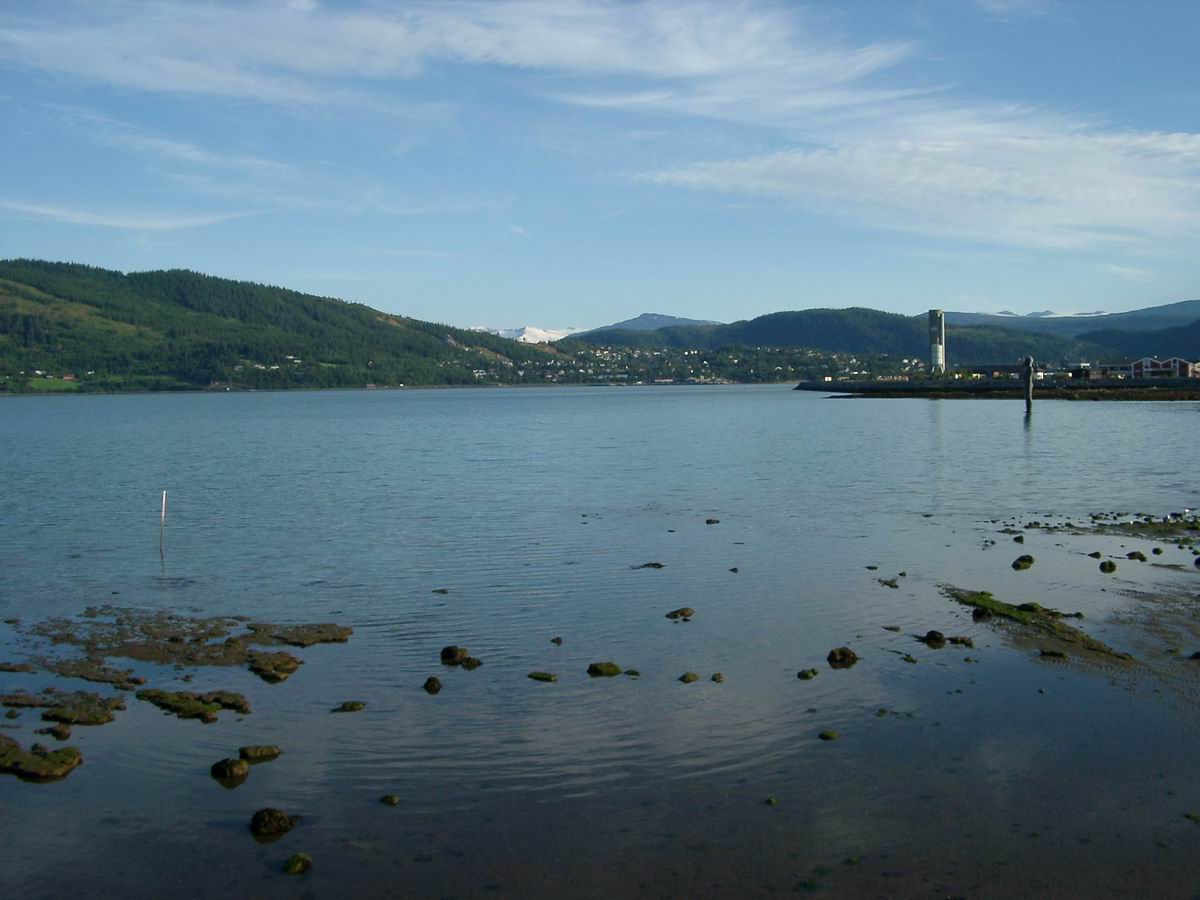
Mo i Rana, Norway

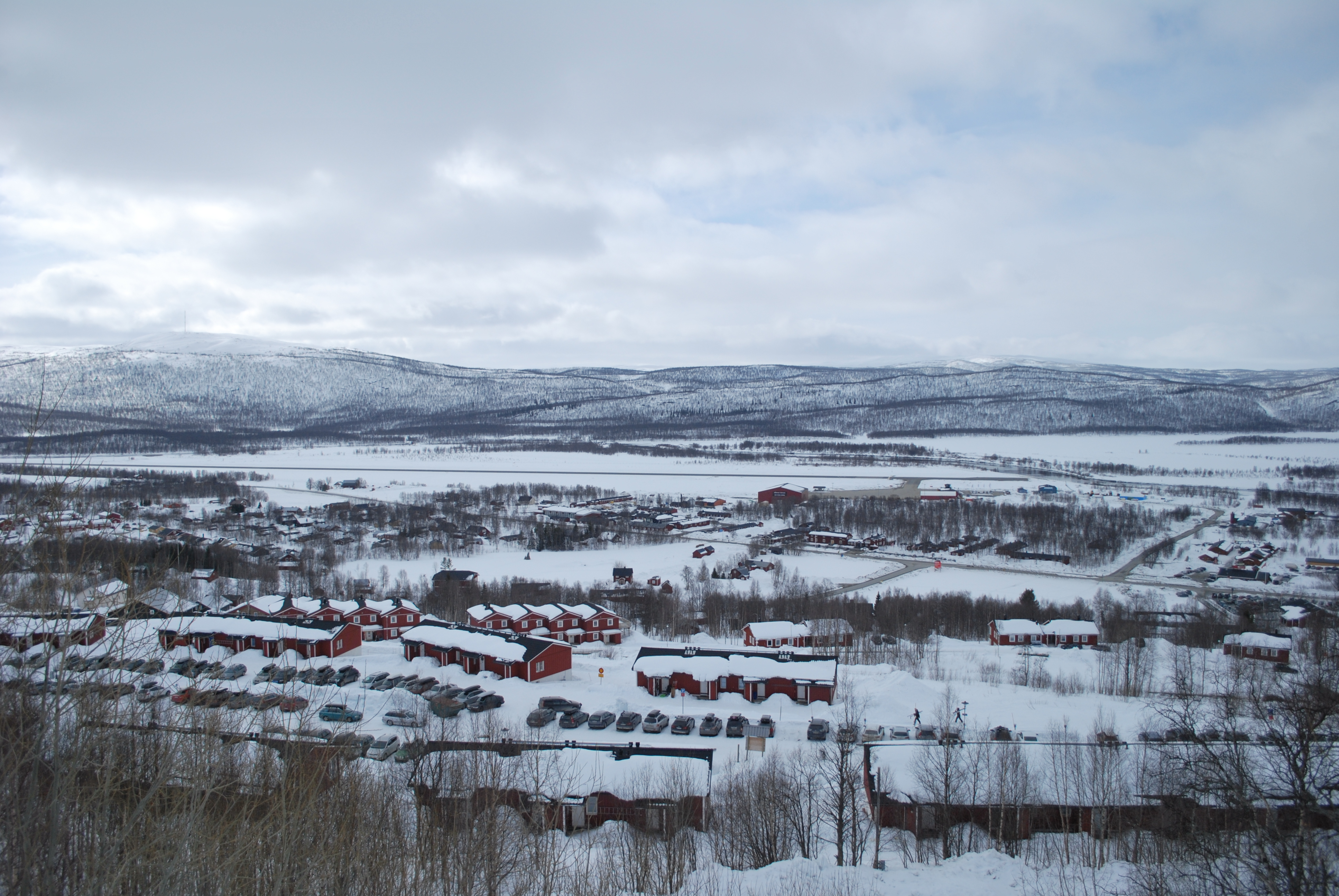
Hemavan, Sweden

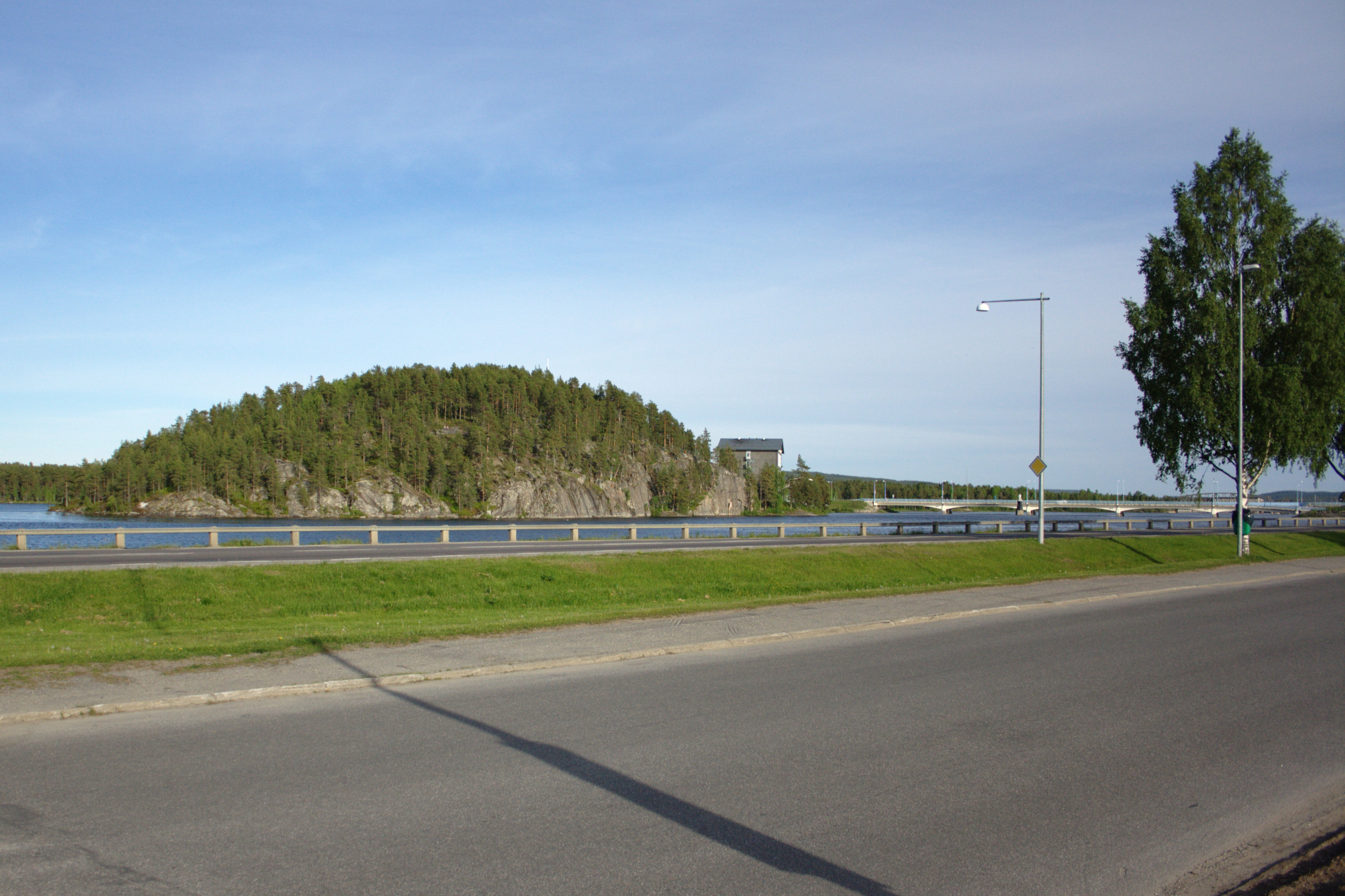
Lycksele, Sweden

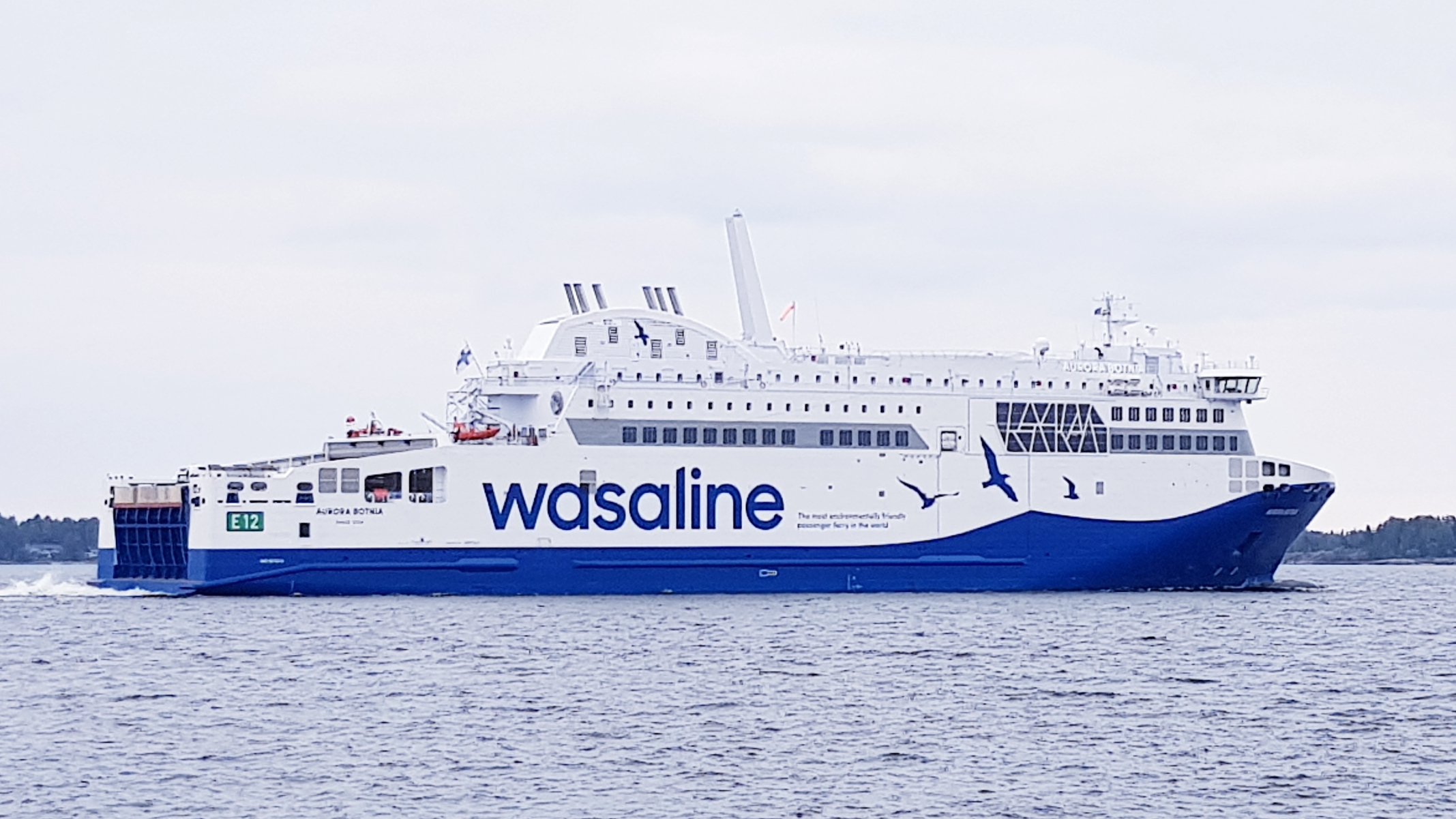
M/S Aurora Botnia, between Umeå and Vaasa

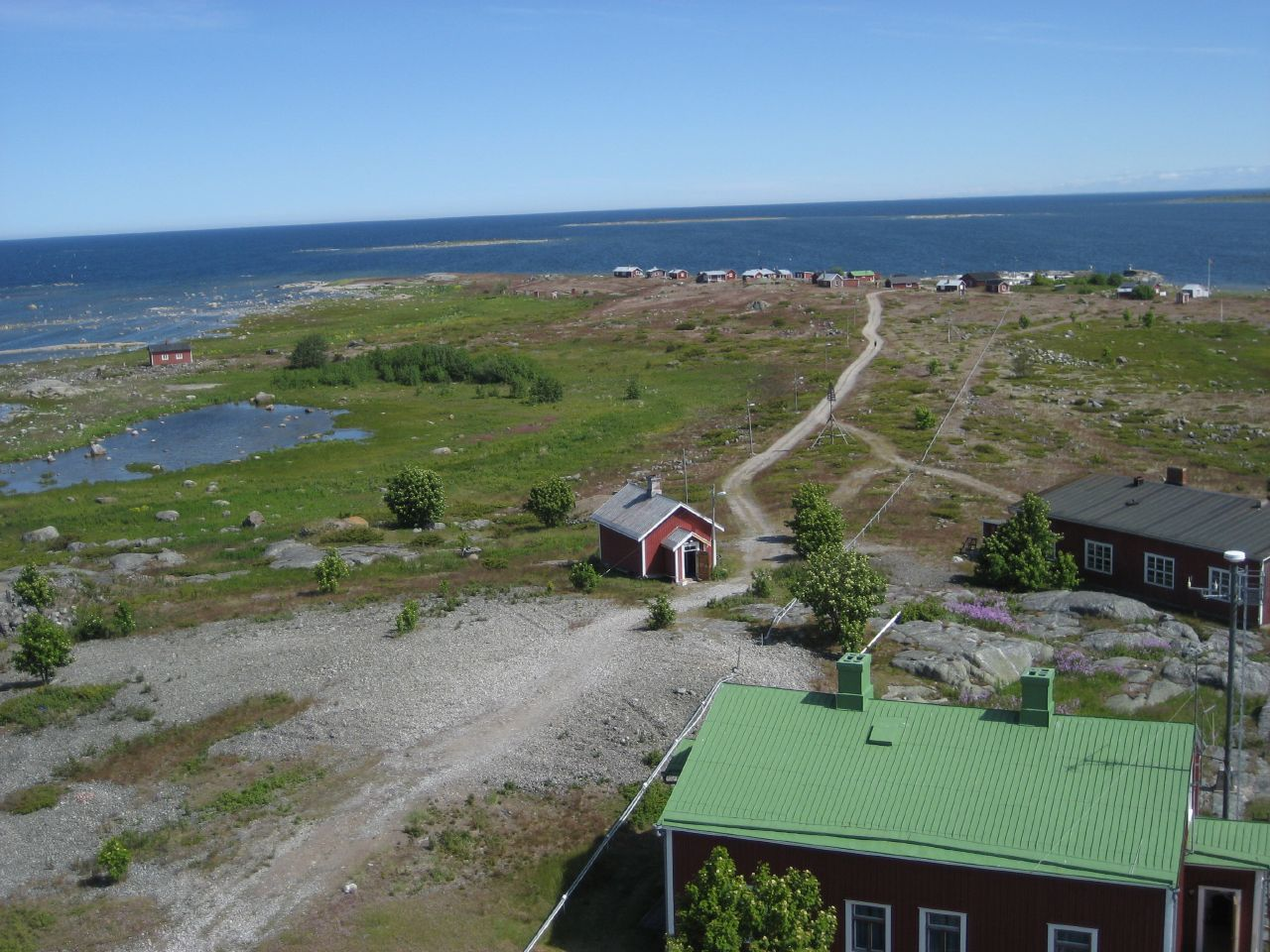
Kvarken, Finland

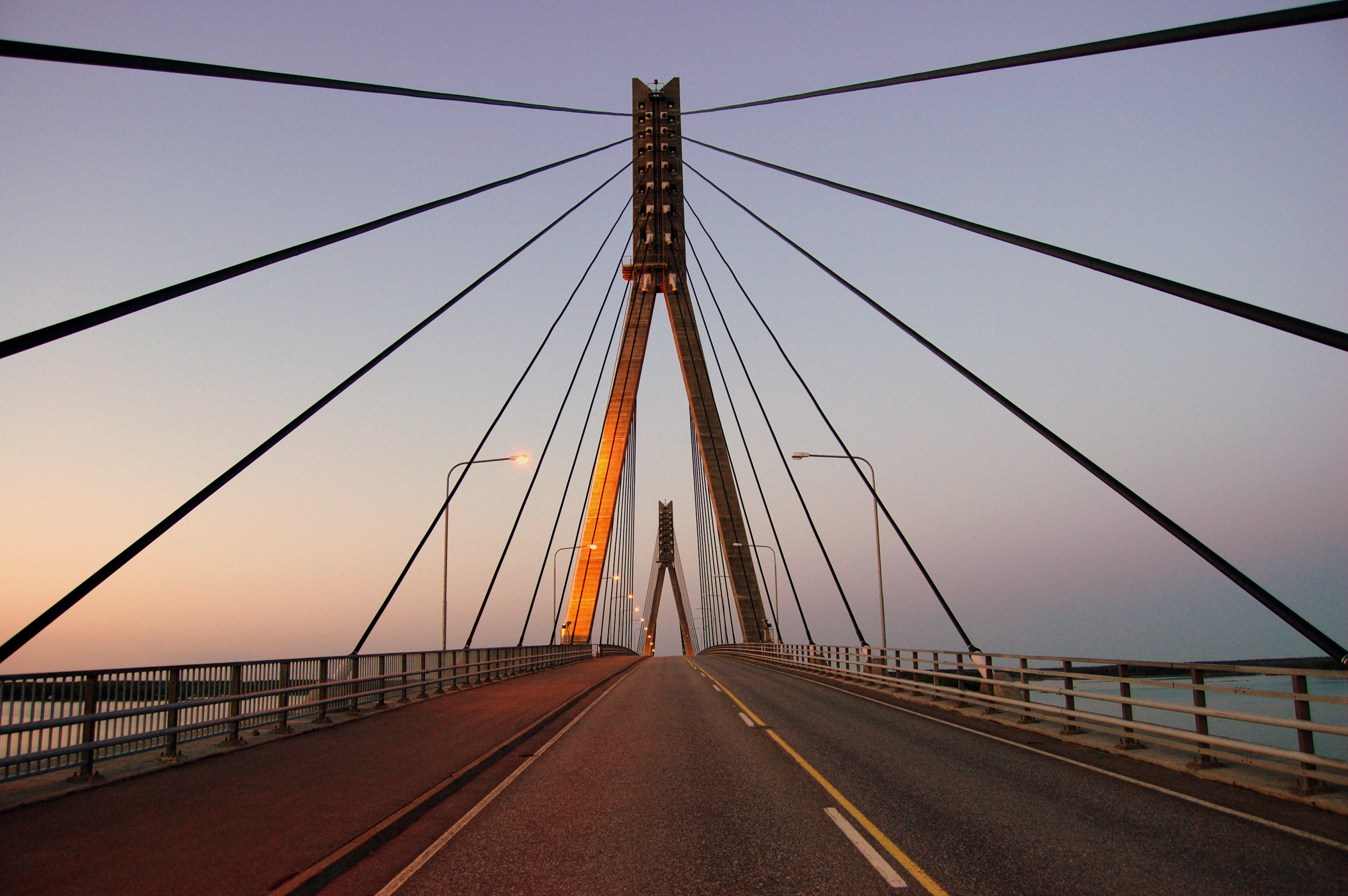
Replot Bridge, Finland

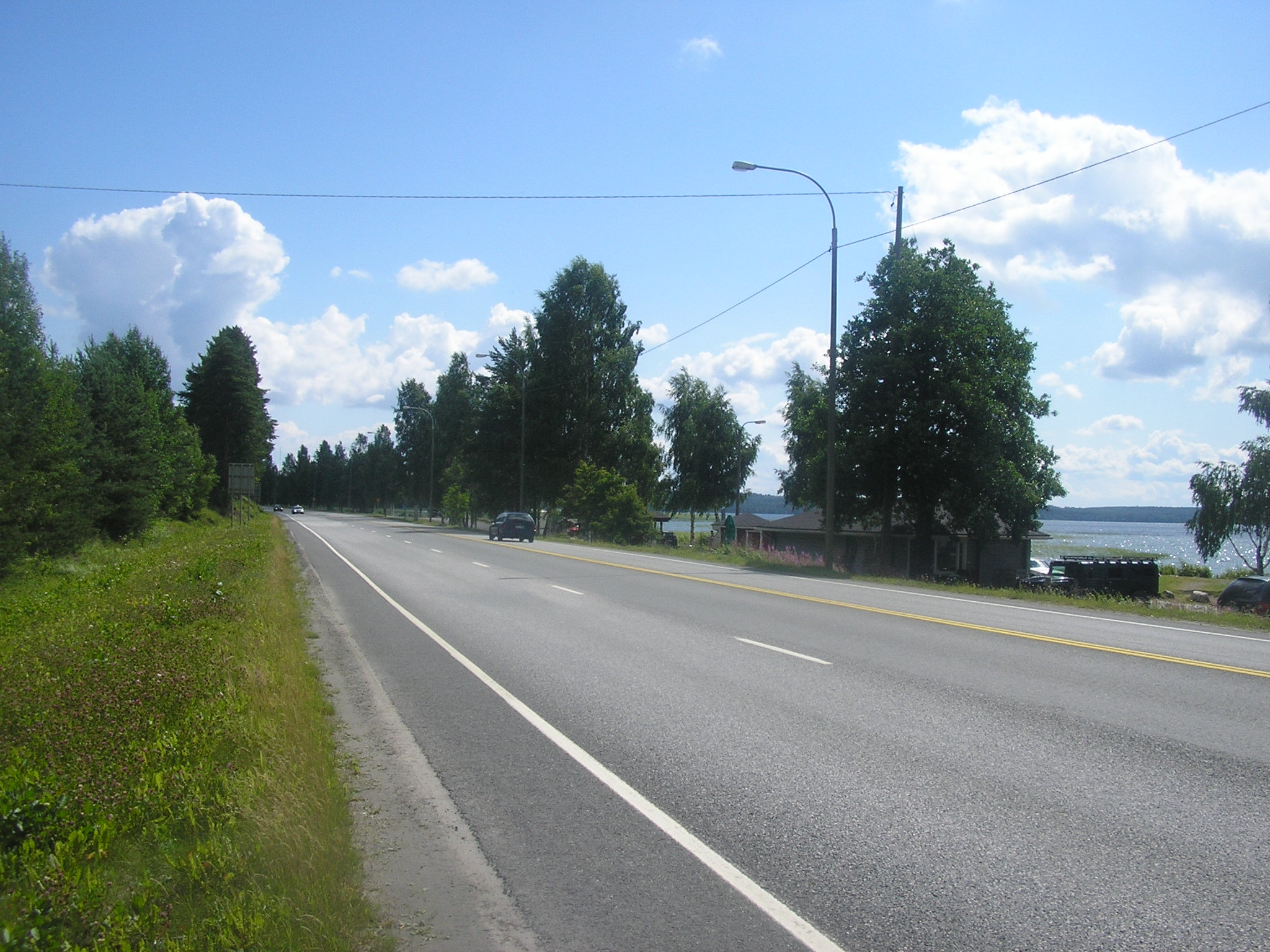
Liperi, Finland

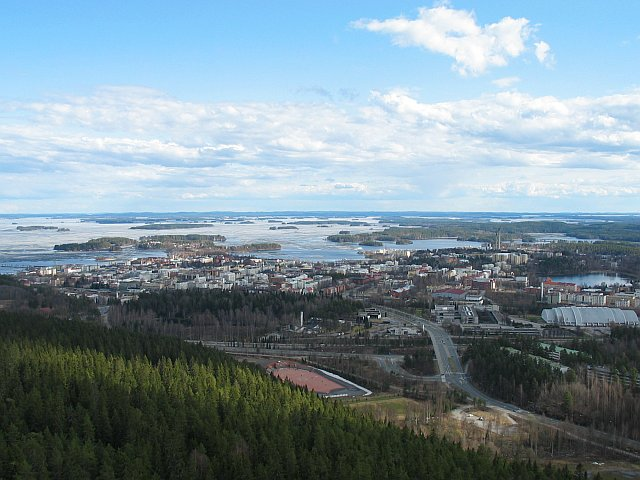
Kuopio, Finland

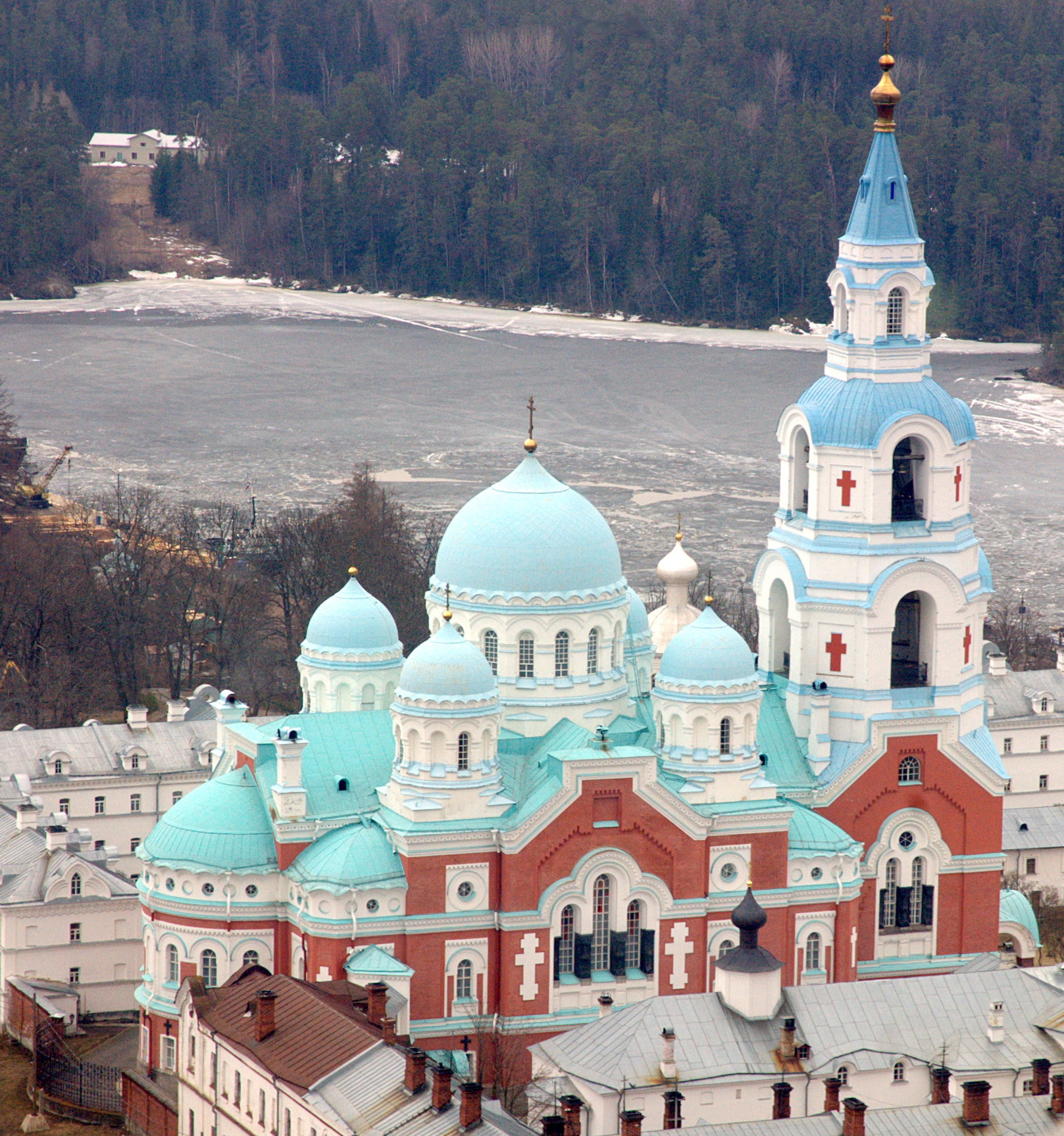
Valaam Monastery, Russia

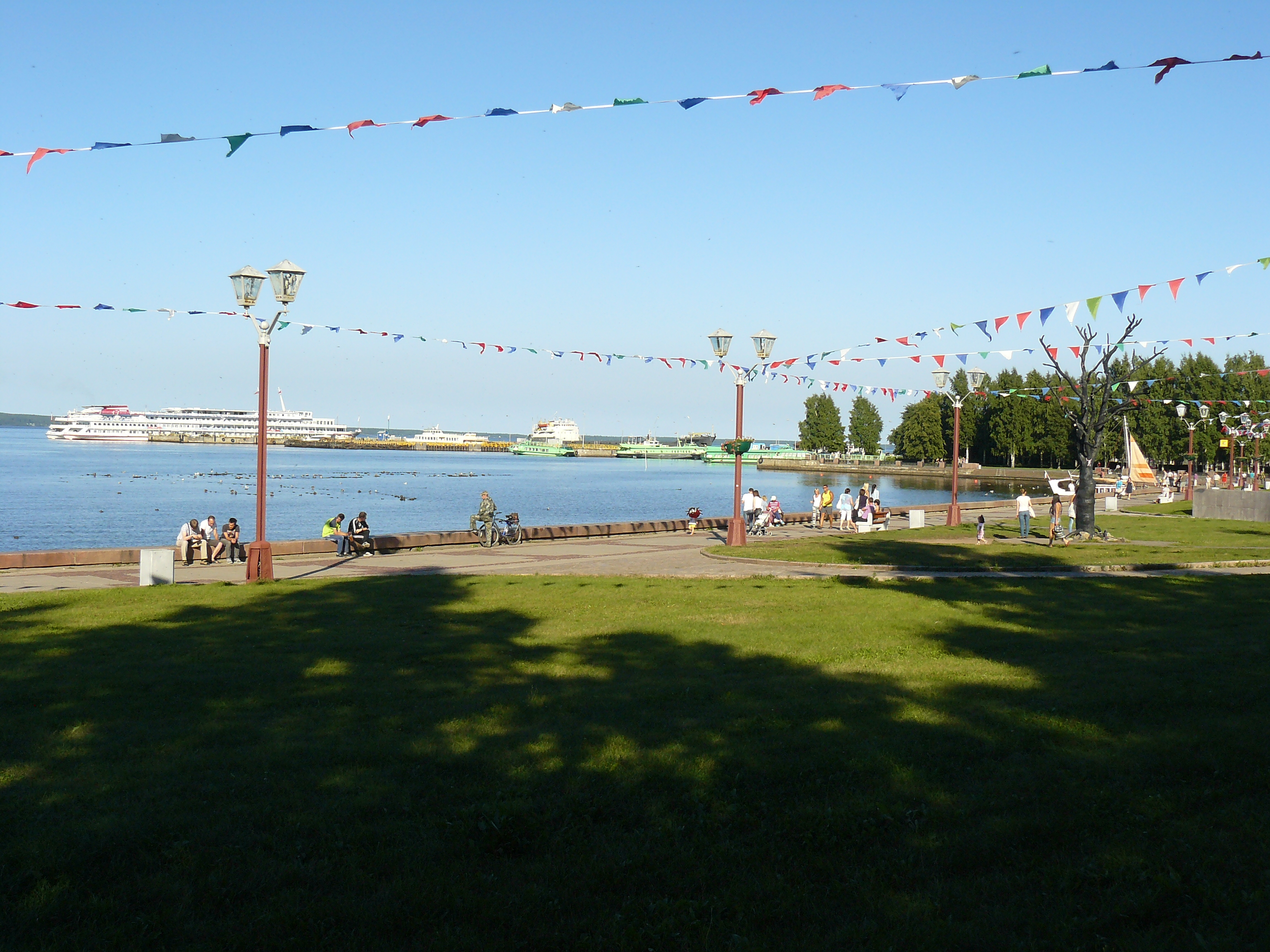
Petrozavodsk, Russia

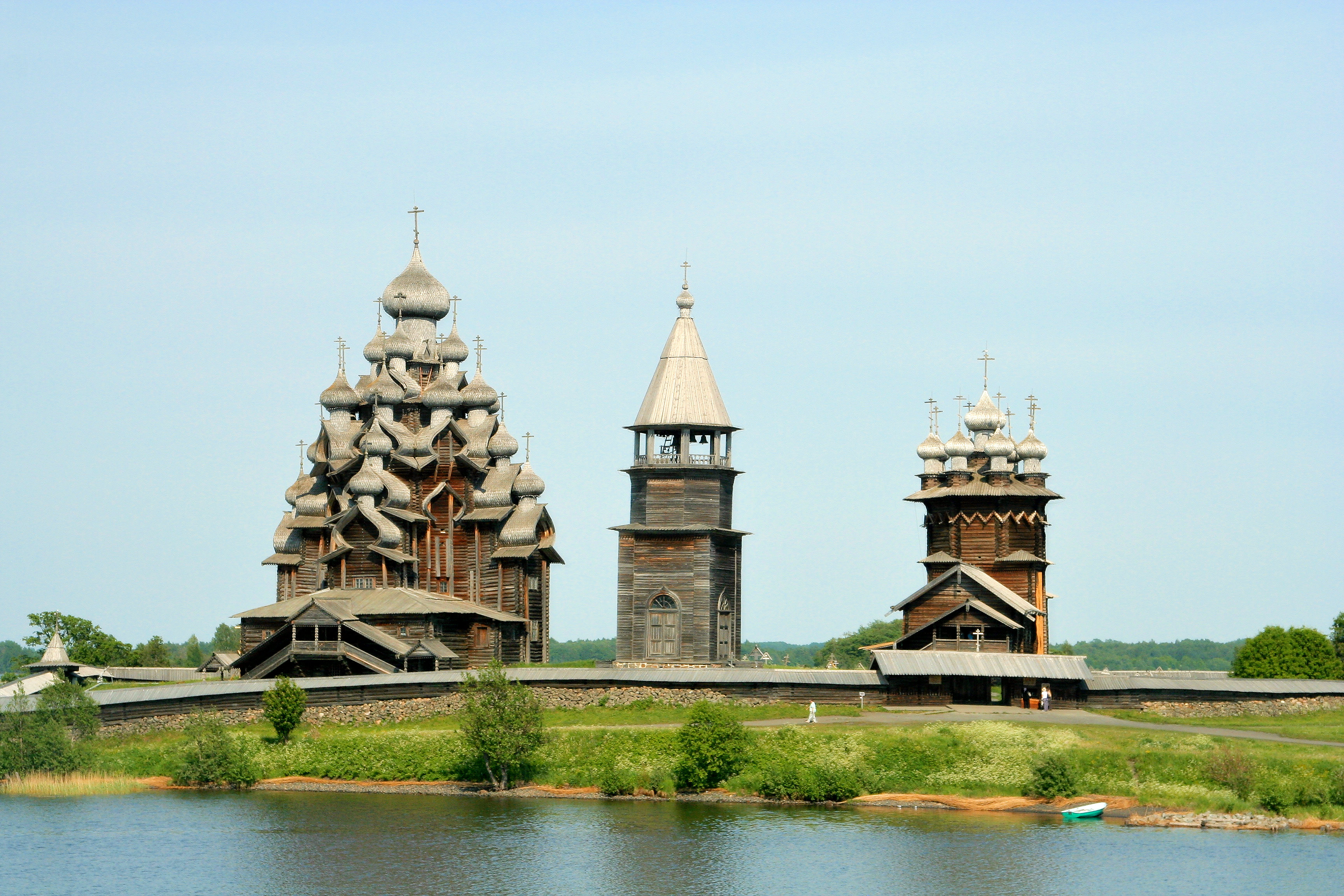
Kizhi, Russia

== See also ==
- European route E12
