= Vuosjärvi =

Lake in Finland

- Location within Finland
- Coordinates: 63°00′N 25°28′E
- Type: Lake
- Catchment area: Kymijoki
- Basin countries: Finland
- Surface area: 39.795 km^{2} (15.365 sq mi)
- Average depth: 4.18 m (13.7 ft)
- Max. depth: 25 m (82 ft)
- Water volume: 0.166 km^{3} (135,000 acre⋅ft)
- Shore length^{1}: 145.39 km (90.34 mi)
- Surface elevation: 107.2 m (352 ft)
- Frozen: December–April
- Islands: Hotakansaari, Lintusaari, Korpisaari, Hanhisaari
- ^{1} Shore length is not a well-defined measure.

Vuosjärvi is a medium-sized lake of Finland in northern Central Finland, Kannonkoski and Viitasaari. The water flows from Lake Kivijärvi through Hilmo Power Station and the water continues to the Huopanankoski rapids. Near the power station there are Hilmonjoki rapids, too. The lake is quite shallow and good for fishing lake forells and zanders.

== See also ==
- List of lakes in Finland
