= Kivach =

Kivach may refer to:

- Kivach waterfall, a waterfall on the Suna River in Republic of Karelia
- Kivach Nature Reserve, a natural reserve in Republic of Karelia including the Kivach waterfall.
