= Haapanen =

Haapanen is a Finnish surname. Notable people with the surname include:

- Santeri Haapanen (1877–1957), Finnish schoolteacher, farmer and politician
- Jalmari Haapanen (1882–1961), Finnish farmer and politician
- Toivo Haapanen (1889–1950), Finnish conductor and music scholar
- Lauri Haapanen (1889–1947), Finnish wrestler
- Markus Haapanen (born 1996), Finnish ice hockey defenceman
