= Huopana =

Village in Viitasaari, Finland

- Village
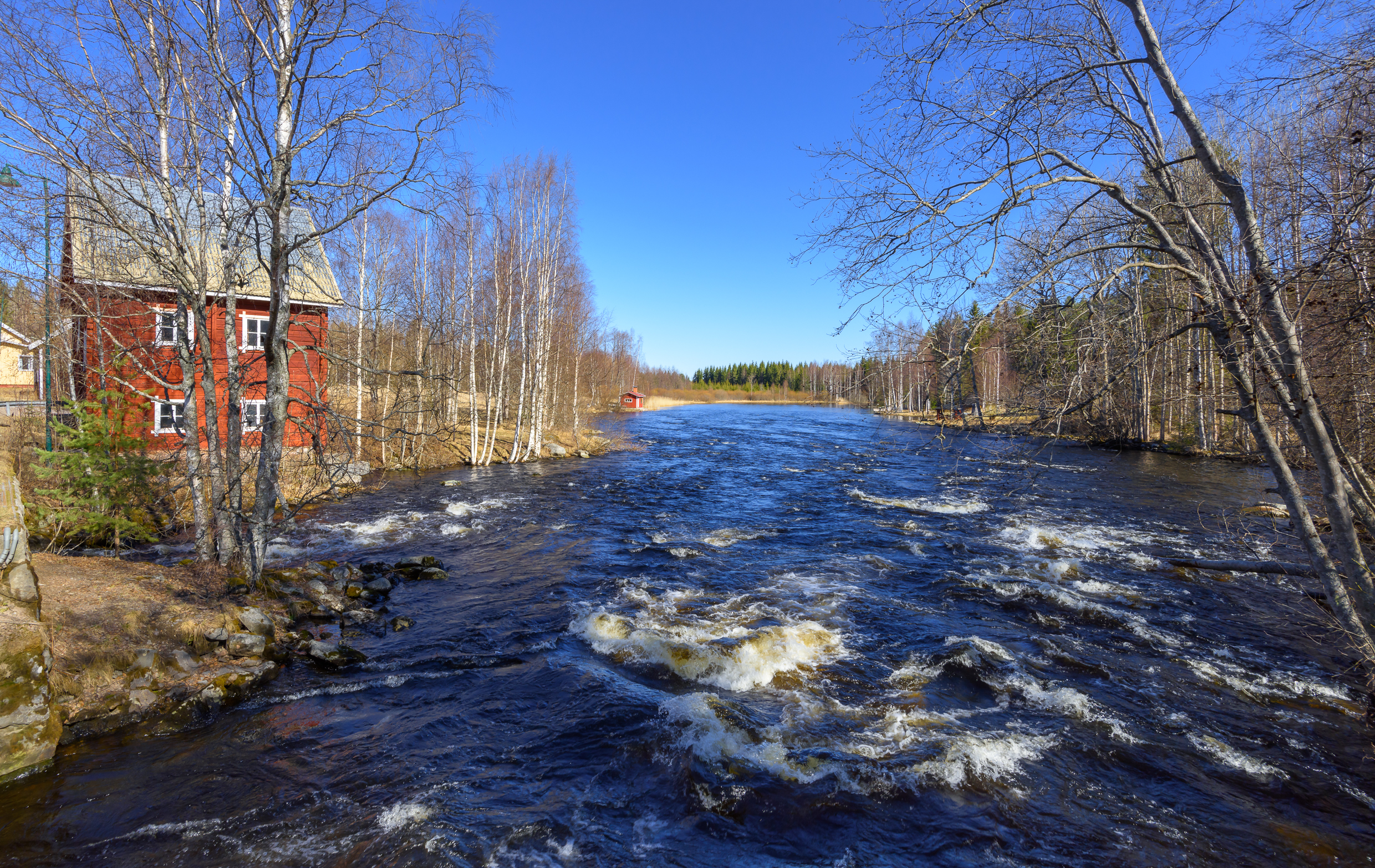
- Huopanankoski

- Location in Central Finland
- Coordinates: 63.0536°N 25.5758°E
- Country: Finland
- Region: Central Finland
- Sub-region: Saarijärvi-Viitasaari sub-region
- Municipality: Viitasaari
- Time zone: UTC+2 (EET)
  - Summer (DST): UTC+3 (EEST)
- Postal code: 44580

Huopana (Finnish pronunciation: [ˈhuo̯pɑnɑ]) is a village in the municipality of Viitasaari in Central Finland, Finland. It is located along Highway 77, about 20 kilometres (12 mi) west of the town centre near the border of Kannonkoski. The village is particularly known for the Huopanankoski rapids. There is one primary school in Huopana.

Permanent settlement came to Huopana after the mid-16th century, and already in 1560 the village had three tax-paying houses. In 1870, there were 623 residents, and in the 20th century, there were over 30 farmers in the Huopana area, 25 new dwellings on state land, and a total of 55 crofts.

== See also ==
- Blue Highway (tourist route)
