= Kannonselkä =

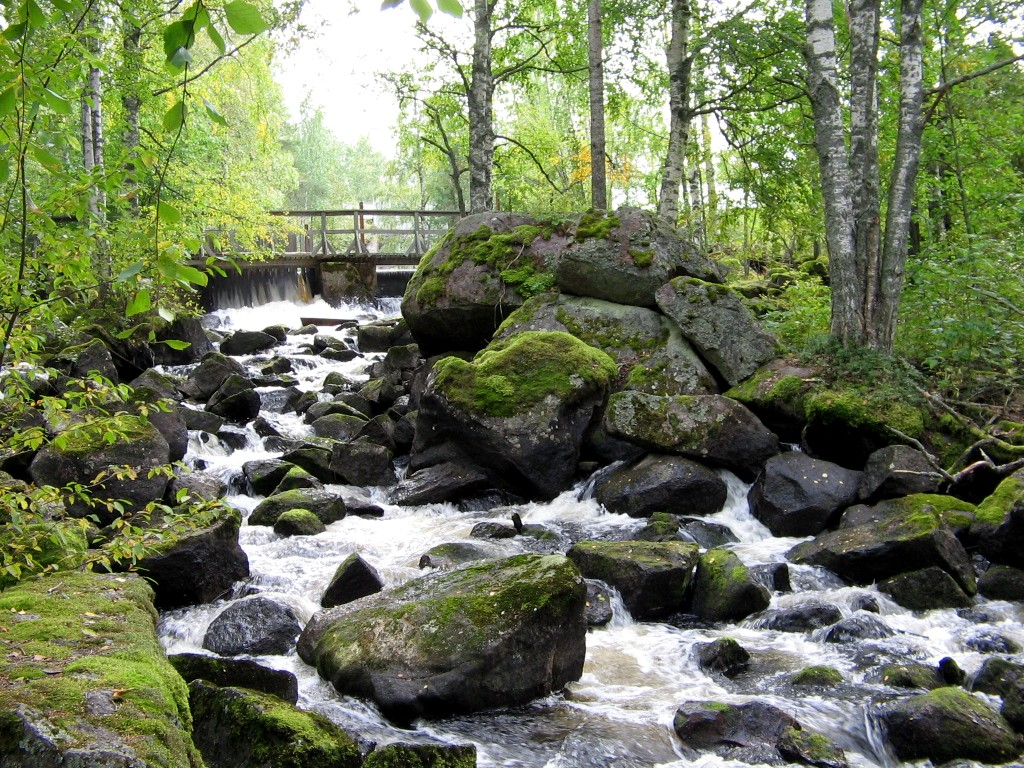

- Location within Finland
- Location: Kannonkoski
- Coordinates: 62°54′N 25°15′E
- Type: Lake
- Primary inflows: Pajusalmi
- Primary outflows: Kannonkoski rapids
- Catchment area: Kymijoki
- Basin countries: Finland
- Surface area: 11.236 km^{2} (4.338 sq mi)
- Average depth: 4.74 m (15.6 ft)
- Max. depth: 19.44 m (63.8 ft)
- Water volume: 0.0538 km^{3} (43,600 acre⋅ft)
- Shore length^{1}: 49.41 km (30.70 mi)
- Surface elevation: 140.7 m (462 ft)
- Frozen: December–April
- Islands: Räihänsaari
- ^{1} Shore length is not a well-defined measure.

Kannonselkä (also called Kannonjärvi) is a medium-sized lake of Central Finland in the Kymijoki main catchment area. It is in the area of Kannonkoski municipality. The lake is in quite natural condition and there are good possibilities for fishing. There are several archaeological settlement places in Otaniemi on the lake shore.

== See also ==
- List of lakes in Finland
