= Puranen =

Puranen is a Finnish surname. Notable people with the surname include:

- Antero Puranen (born 1952), Finnish Olympic javelin thrower
- Tapani Puranen (born 1957), Finnish composer
- Kimmo Puranen (born 1958), Finnish fencer
- Leena Puranen (born 1986), Finnish football forward
