= Muuruejärvi =

Lake in the country of Finland

- Location within Finland
- Coordinates: 63°05′N 25°32′E
- Type: Lake
- Catchment area: Kymijoki
- Basin countries: Finland
- Surface area: 25.3 km^{2} (9.8 sq mi)
- Average depth: 4.98 m (16.3 ft)
- Max. depth: 25.78 m (84.6 ft)
- Water volume: 0.126 km^{3} (102,000 acre⋅ft)
- Shore length^{1}: 105.44 km (65.52 mi)
- Surface elevation: 100.8 m (331 ft)
- Frozen: December-April
- Islands: Rajasaari, Rutasaari, Vihonsaari, Hirvisaari, Mokonsaari
- ^{1} Shore length is not a well-defined measure.

Muuruejärvi is a medium-sized lake of Finland. It is situated in Viitasaari, in Central Finland. The lake has a surface area of 25.3 km² and is located between two rapids, Huopanankoski and Keihärinkoski.

== See also ==
- List of lakes in Finland
