= Kannonkoski =

- Municipality
- Kannonkosken kunta Kannonkoski kommun
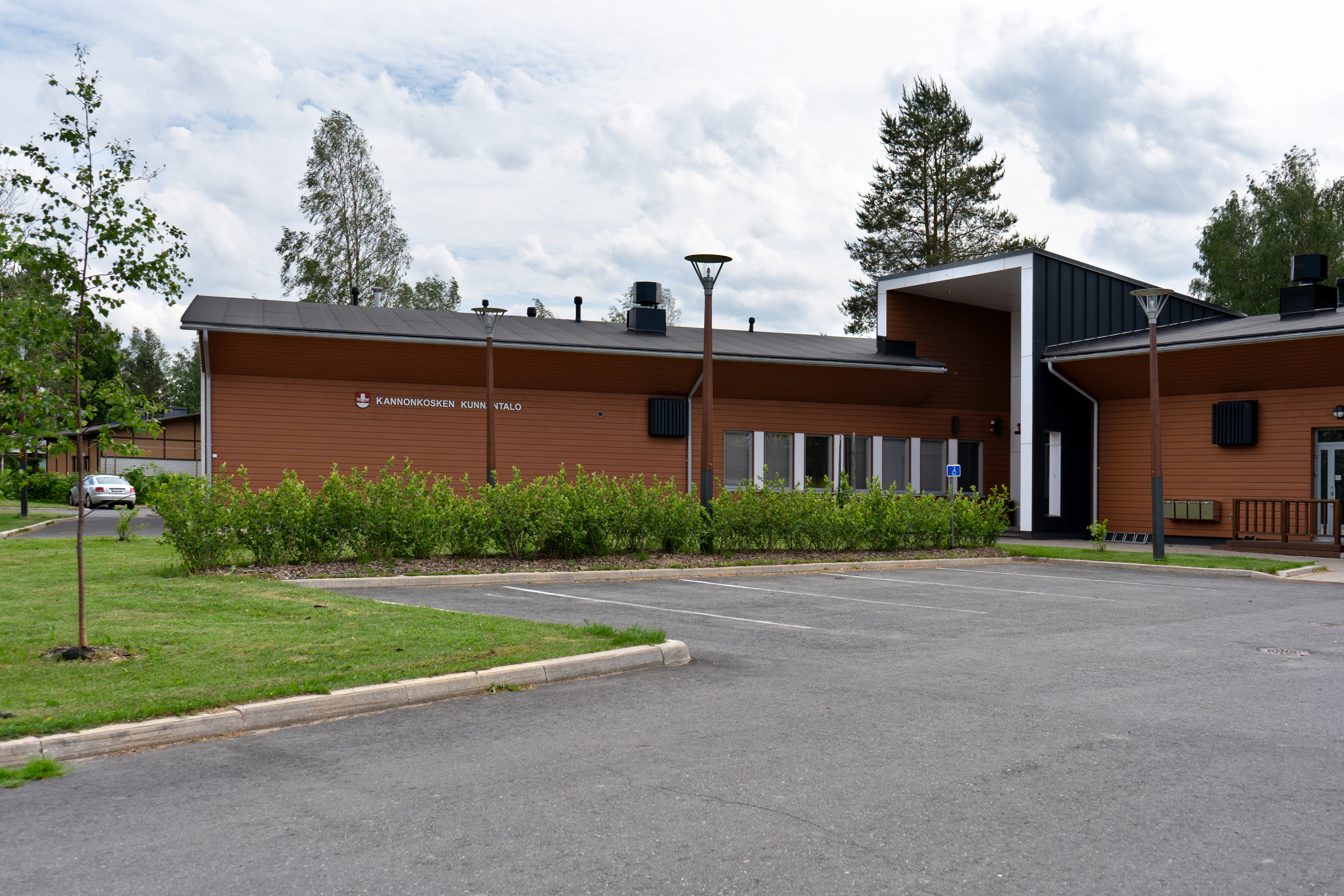
- Kannonkoski municipal office

- Coat of arms

- Location of Kannonkoski in Finland
- Interactive map of Kannonkoski
- Coordinates: 62°58.5′N 025°16′E
- Country: Finland
- Region: Central Finland
- Sub-region: Saarijärvi–Viitasaari sub-region
- Charter: 1934

Government
  - Municipal manager: Maarit Autio

Area (2018-01-01)
  - Total: 549.88 km^{2} (212.31 sq mi)
  - Land: 445 km^{2} (172 sq mi)
  - Water: 104.87 km^{2} (40.49 sq mi)
  - Rank: 196th largest in Finland

Population (2025-12-31)
  - Total: 1,137
  - Rank: 285th largest in Finland
  - Density: 2.56/km^{2} (6.6/sq mi)

Population by native language
  - Finnish: 98.3% (official)
  - Others: 1.7%

Population by age
  - 0 to 14: 12%
  - 15 to 64: 50.9%
  - 65 or older: 37.1%
- Time zone: UTC+02:00 (EET)
  - Summer (DST): UTC+03:00 (EEST)
- Website: kannonkoski.fi

Kannonkoski is a Finnish municipality located in the Central Finland region. The municipality has a population of 1,137 (31 December 2025) and covers an area of 549.88 square kilometres (212.31 sq mi) of which 104.87 km^{2} (40.49 sq mi), or 19%, is water. Neighbouring municipalities are Karstula, Kivijärvi, Saarijärvi, Viitasaari and Äänekoski.

Kannonkoski is located in the Suomenselkä river basin in the upper reaches of the Kymijoki river system. The Kannonkoski water systems belong to the Saarijärvi, Kivijärvi and Viitasaari routes. The largest lake in the municipality is Kivijärvi.

The municipality is unilingually Finnish.

== History ==
Kannonkoski as a settlement name is very new, originally only referring to the rapids which connect the lake Kannonjärvi to the lake Kivijärvi. The toponym kannonn Maa [sic] was mentioned in 1552, referring to hunting grounds of the people of Sysmä in this area. The people of Pälkäne also had hunting grounds around the rapids and the name Kannonkoski may be derived from Kantokylä, a village in Pälkäne. By 1558 the area had got permanent Savonian settlers, who established the village of Kantojärvi (transcribed as Kandoijerffuij). Rautalampi, including this area, became a separate parish in 1561.

Viitasaari was separated from Rautalampi in 1635. At the time, it included all of the villages that would later become parts of the municipality of Kannonkoski. Kivijärvi was split off from Viitasaari in 1904.

In 1919 it was decided that the area should get its own parish, which happened in 1931. The parish was formed from parts of Viitasaari and Kivijärvi. The area became a municipality in 1934. The church and administrative center were placed in the village of Pudasjärvi, however because a municipality called Pudasjärvi already existed, the new municipality was named Kannonkoski after the nearby rapids.

=== Orthodox monks ===
During the Winter War, 117 monks from the Valamo monastery in the lake Ladoga were evacuated. They arrived in Kannonkoski in 1939, bringing various icons and relics with them. The monks lived in the Piispala school, which at the time was closed due to the ongoing war.

The monks left Kannonkoski in the autumn of 1940 after they had purchased an old manor in Heinävesi, where the New Valamo monastery was soon established. 27 monks died during the evacuation and were buried in the graveyard of the Lutheran Kannonkoski church.

=== Proposed Suomenselkä municipality ===
Kannonkoski, Karstula, Kivijärvi and Kyyjärvi had planned to merge into the Suomenselkä municipality from January 1, 2022. Karstula, Kivijärvi and Kyyjärvi accepted the merger proposal, but Kannonkoski did not. After Kannonkoski opted out of the planned merger, Kivijärvi also left out, and later the merger project of the remaining Karstula and Kyyjärvi failed at the Kyyjärvi municipal council meeting held on May 17, 2021, and the Ministry of Finance did not propose a forced merger either.

== Nature ==
There are all together 81 lakes in Kannonkoski. Biggest lakes are Kivijärvi, Vuosjärvi and Kannonselkä.

== Notable people ==
- Mikko Hirvonen, rally driver

== Gallery ==
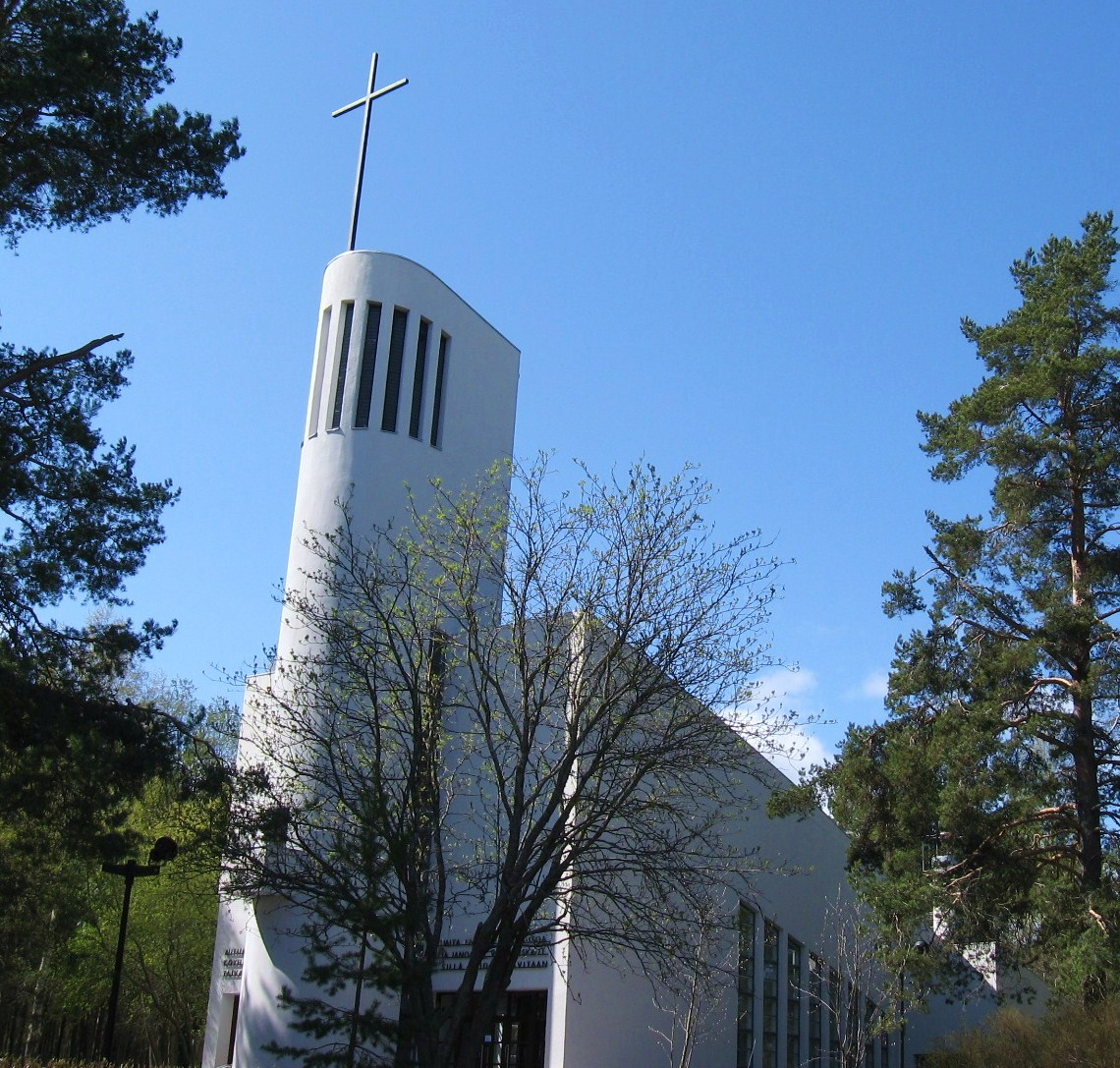
Kannonkoski Church

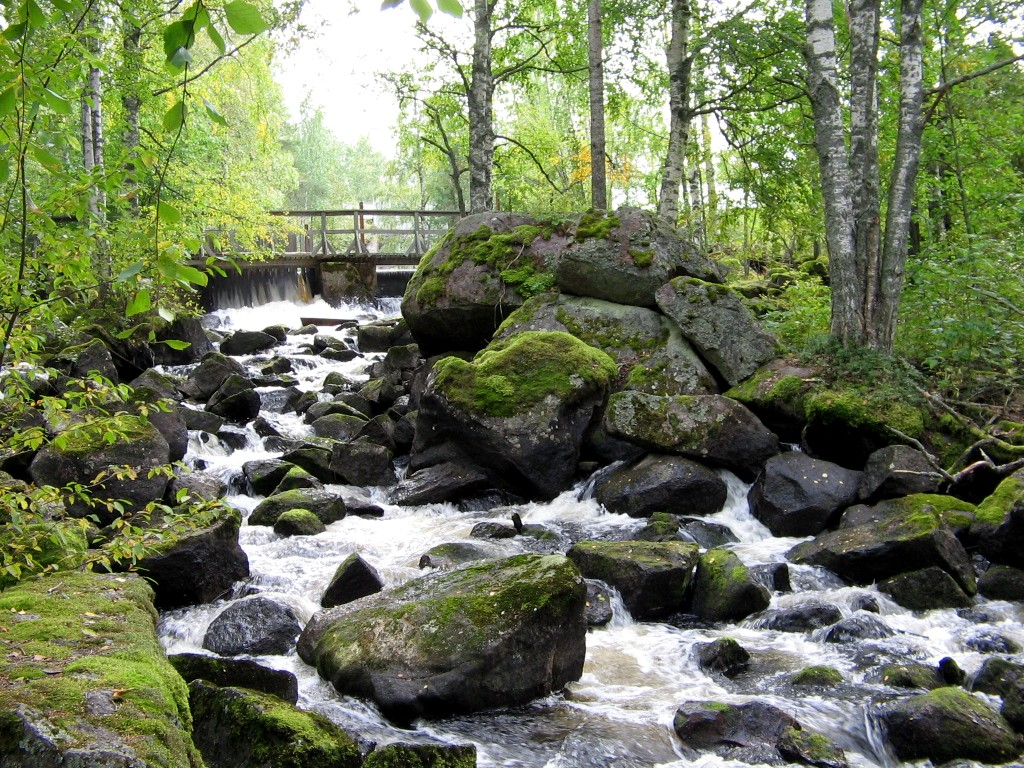
Kannonkoski rapids

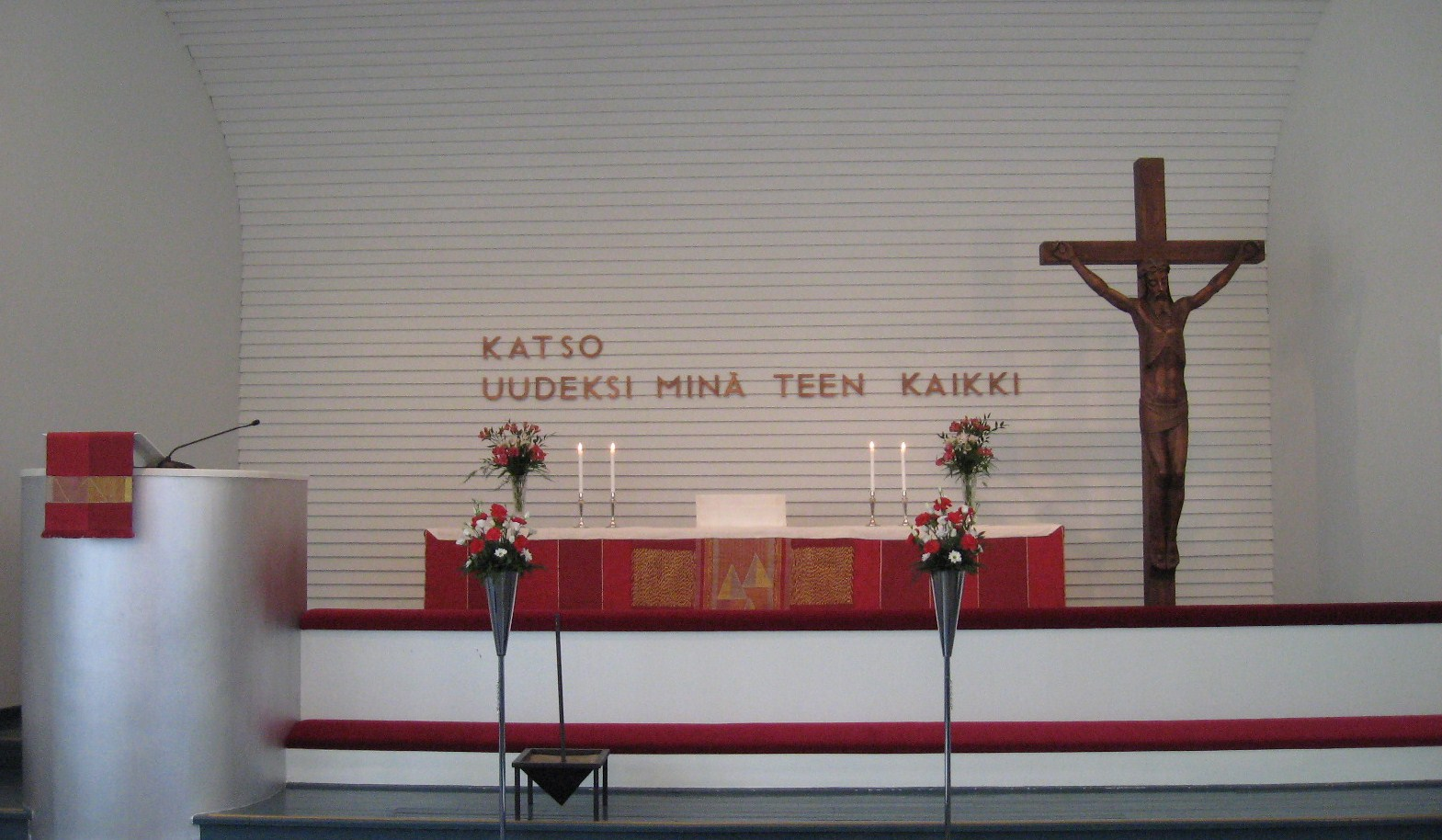
The altar of Kannonkoski Church

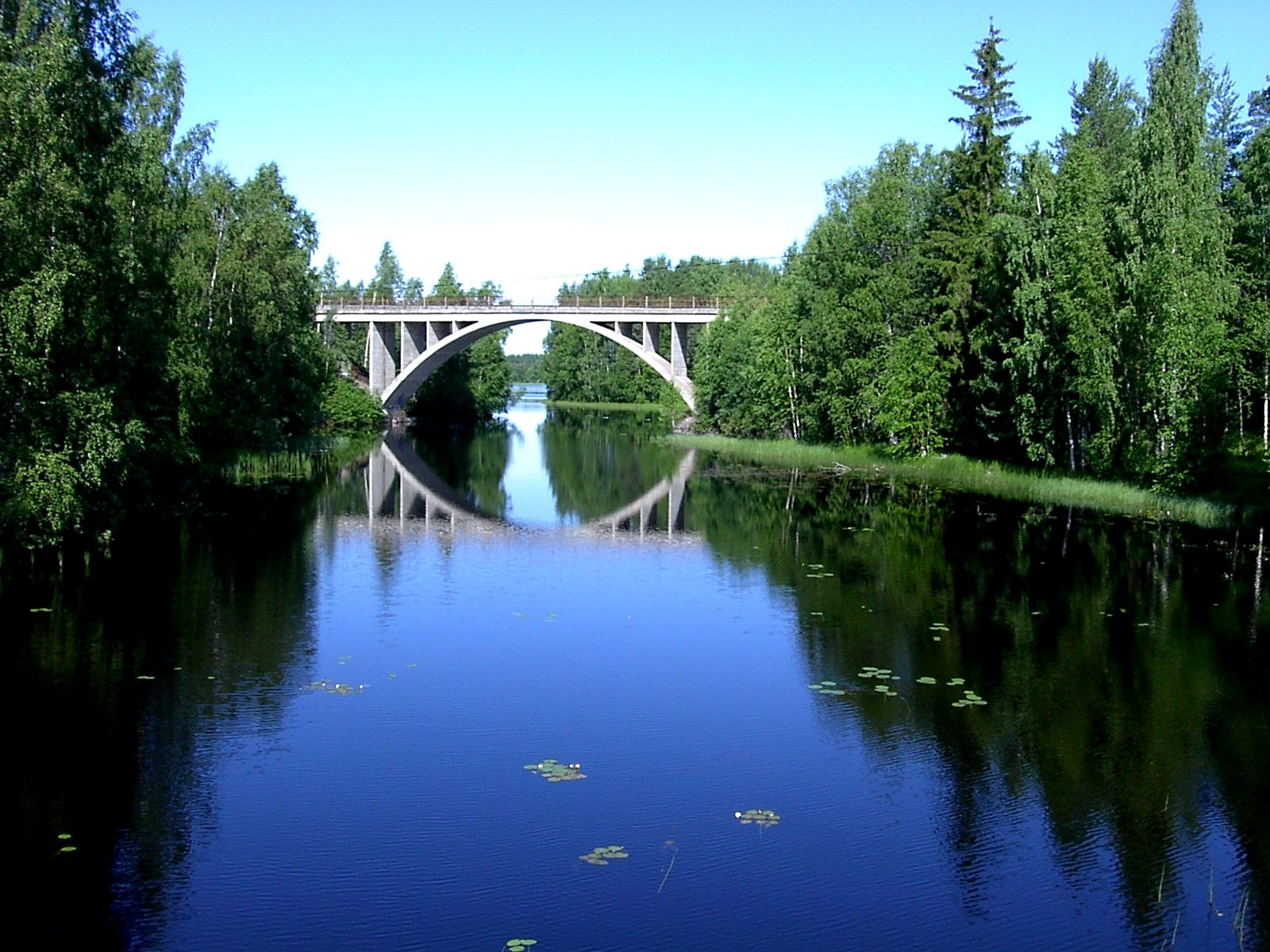
Potmo railway bridge

== Twinnings ==
- Mäksa Parish, Estonia
