= Hytönen =

Hytönen is a Finnish surname. Notable people with the surname include:

- Aarne Hytönen (1901–1972), Finnish architect
- Erkki Hytönen (1933–2020), Finnish ice hockey player
- Juha-Pekka Hytönen (born 1981), Finnish ice hockey forward
