= Lepikko torp =

Building in Pielavesi, Finland

- Lepikon torppa
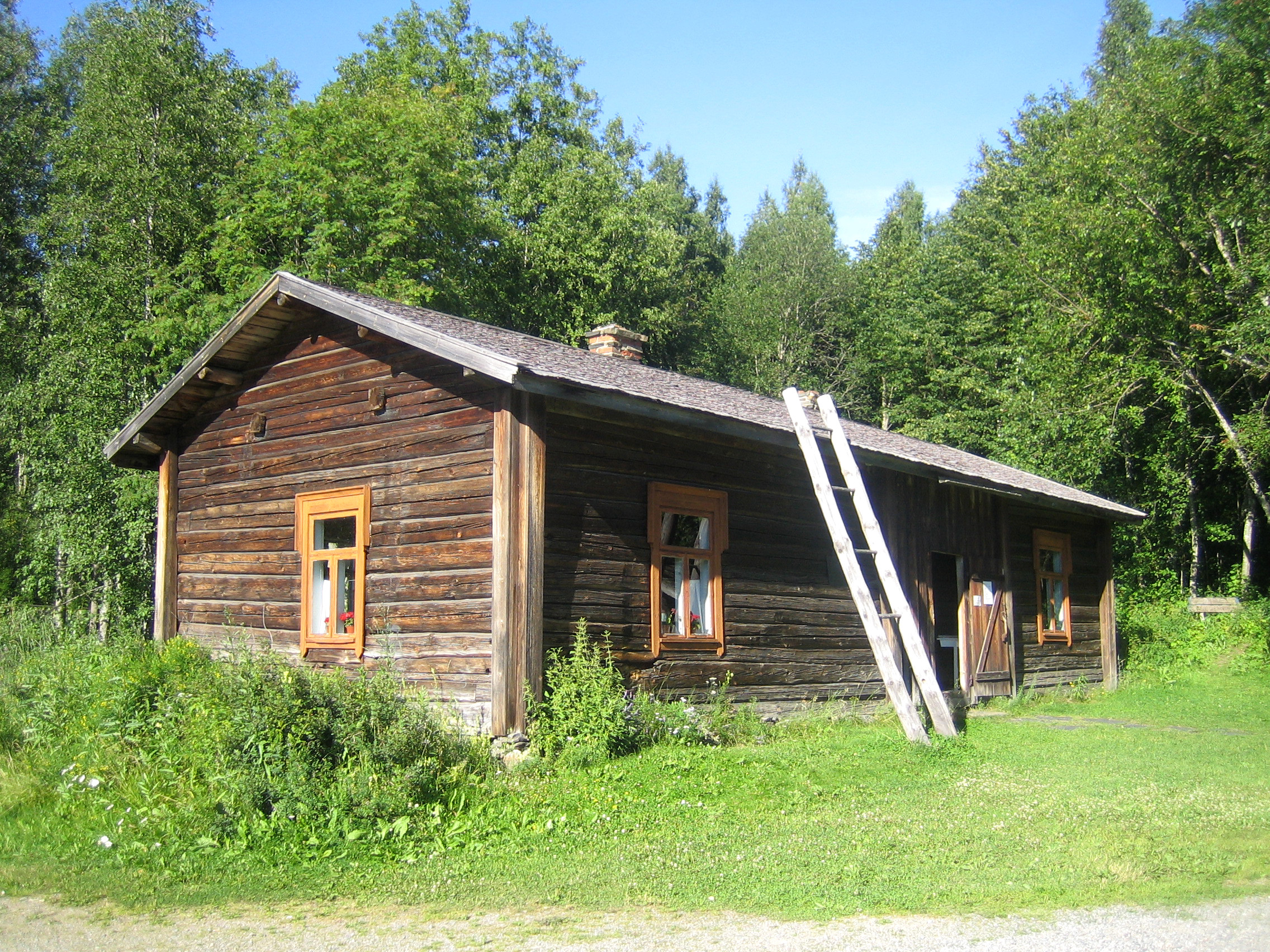
- Lepikko torp in 2010
- Interactive map of the Lepikko torp area

General information
- Location: Urho Kekkosentie 121, Pielavesi, Finland
- Coordinates: 63.2214°N 26.7836°E
- Current tenants: Urho Kekkonen Birthplace Museum
- Year built: 1860s
- Renovated: 1960s
- Owner: Lepikko Foundation

Technical details
- Material: Timber

Design and construction
- Known for: Birthplace of Urho Kekkonen

Website
- www.lepikontorppa.fi

The Lepikko torp (Finnish: Lepikon torppa) is a mid-19th-century torp or croft house located in Pielavesi, central Finland, notable as the birthplace of the 8th President of Finland, Urho Kekkonen (1900–1986).

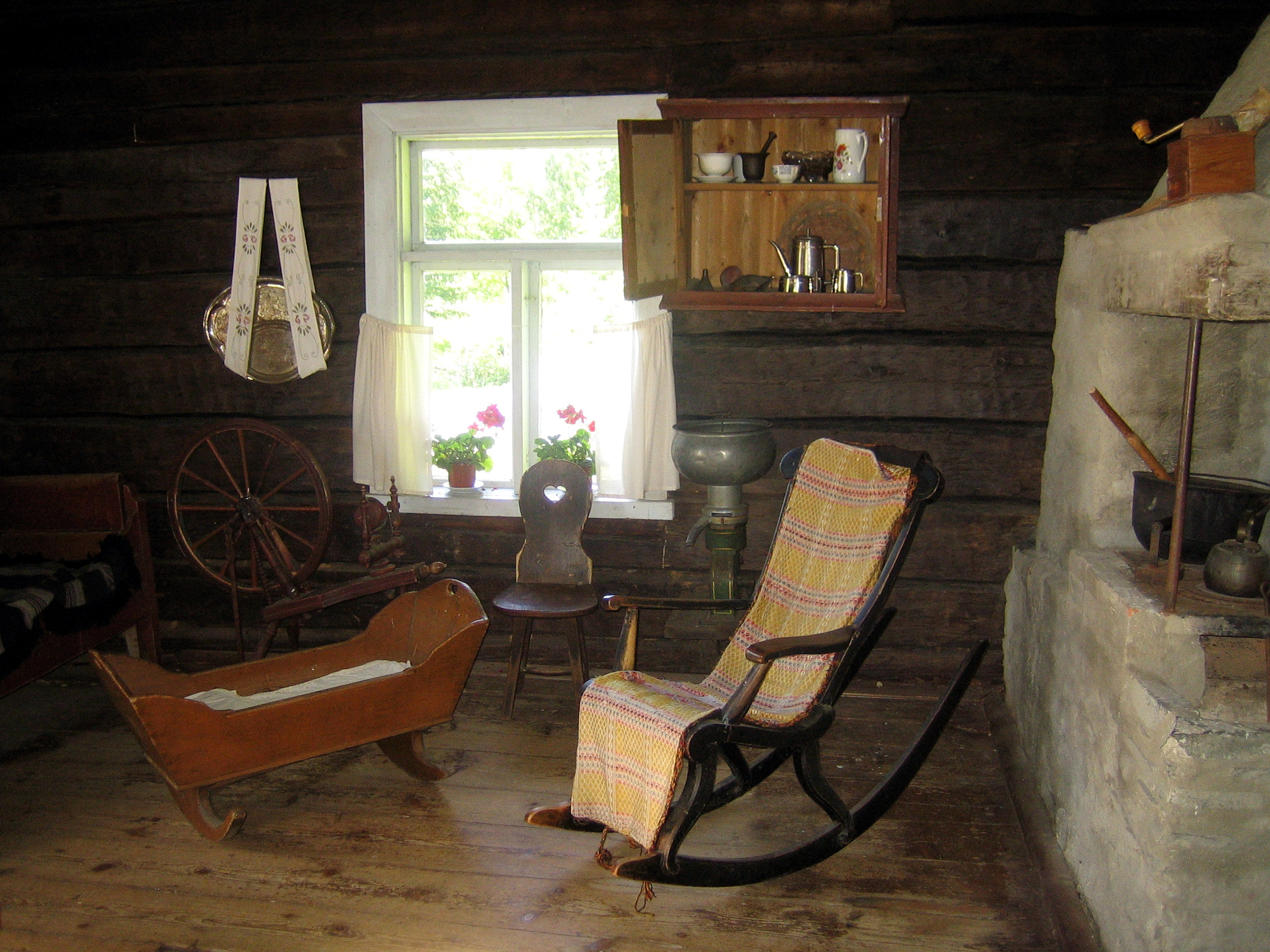
Interior of the torp, c. 2010

The building is constructed of rough-hewn logs, and originally consisted of a single room. When the Kekkonens moved in, they modernised the building, including adding a chimney (previously the primitive stove had none).

The Kekkonens were not actually croft farmers; Urho's father, forestry manager Juho Kekkonen, had rented the house, as it was conveniently located for his job at the time. Nevertheless, when Urho Kekkonen first ran for the presidency, the cottage featured in his campaign, to support his common-man image as the "boy from the torp"; even the chimney was edited out of a well-publicised photograph of the building, to underline its modest standing.

In 1966, the torp was converted into Kekkonen's birthplace museum.

The building has been designated and protected by the Finnish Heritage Agency as a nationally important built cultural environment (Valtakunnallisesti merkittävä rakennettu kulttuuriympäristö).
