= Piispanen =

Piispanen is a Finnish surname. Notable people with the surname include:

- Arsi Piispanen (born 1985), Finnish professional ice hockey forward
- Henri Piispanen (born 1994), Finnish voice actor, singer-songwriter and television presenter
- Markus Piispanen (born 1989), Finnish professional ice hockey winger
- Toni Piispanen (born 1976), Paralympic athlete for Finland
- Ville Piispanen (born 1983), Finnish professional boxer
