= Jalmari Haapanen =

Finnish politician

Jalmari Haapanen (18 November 1882, Kivijärvi - 24 February 1961) was a Finnish farmer and politician. He was a member of the Parliament of Finland from 1916 to 1917, representing the Agrarian League.
