= Kivach Falls =

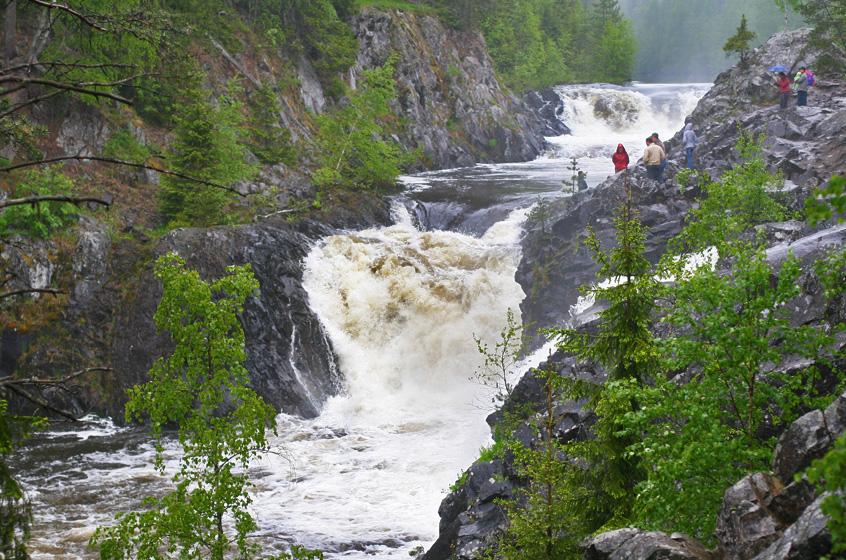
- Kivach in 2006

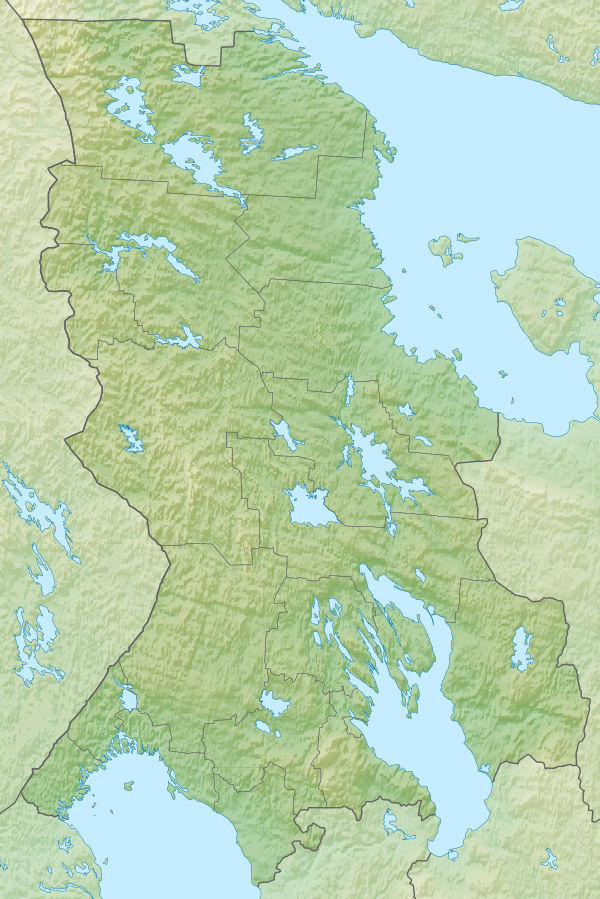
- Location within Karelia Location within Russia
- Location: Karelia, Russia
- Coordinates: 62°16′31″N 33°58′47″E

Kivach Falls (Russian: Кивач, from Karelian kiivas, "impetuous") is a 10.7-m-high cascade waterfall in Russia. It is located on the Suna River in the Kondopoga District, Republic of Karelia and gives its name to the Kivach Natural Reserve, founded in 1931.

== History ==
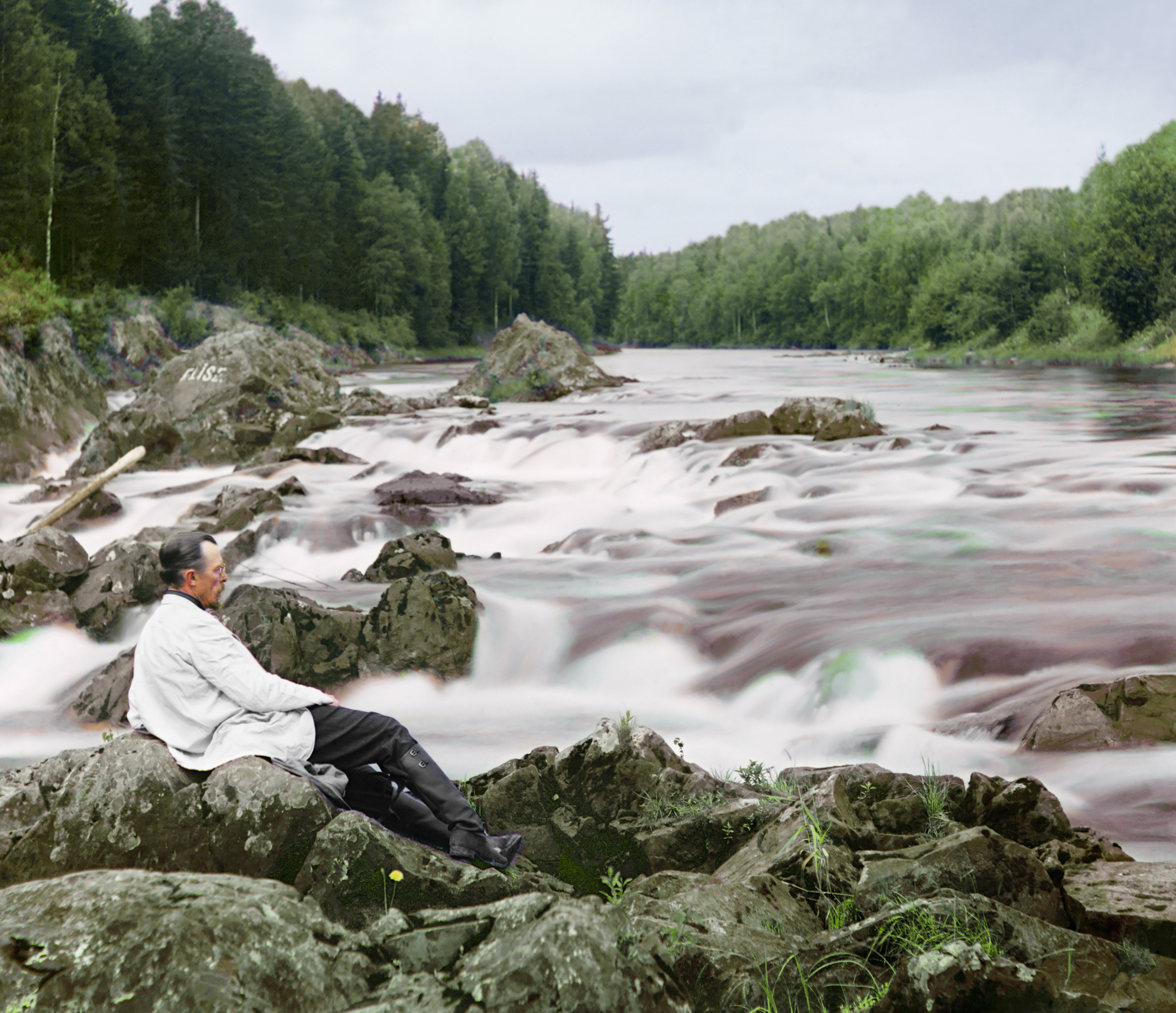
Sergey Prokudin-Gorsky at the waterfall in 1915

Kivach owes much of its fame to Gavrila Derzhavin, a Russian poet who was inspired by its "unruly stream" to write "Waterfall", one of the most important Russian poems of the 18th century. Many other eminent visitors followed Derzhavin to see the famed waterfall. One of these was Alexander II of Russia, who commissioned a new road to Kivach, a pavilion on the right bank of the stream and a bridge slightly downstream.

In 1936, the Soviets diverted part of the river to feed a local hydroelectric power station, which affected the waterfall negatively, while its rivals — Girvas (14.8 m) and Por-Porog (16.8 m) — were destroyed altogether. Although it is not as spectacular as it used to be, Kivach is still considered a major sight in Karelia.

== See also ==
- List of waterfalls
