= Tapani Puranen =

Tapani Puranen (born 1 October 1957 in Juva, Finland) is a composer, arranger, orchestra conductor, recording engineer, and a producer. Since 2018, Puranen has lived in Benalmádena, Spain.

== Major works ==
- The most successful composition written by Tapani Puranen is a pop ballad called "Love Like Never Before" (using the alias Joachim Brooks), which had more than 7,000 airplays in France and was number 1 in the Top Dance chart in January 1996. The performer was Jazmine (United States/Finland). Released by Atoll Music, France.
- A soundtrack for a TV documentary film Avara Luonto - "Suoerämaa" 2018
- Modern/experimental-style composition Unen ja valveen kuvia ("Pictures of the dreams and being awake") to a similarly named multi-episode TV program including paintings of Finnish surrealist painters. This program has been broadcast several times in Finland, Sweden, Norway and Denmark. Director Petri Merta.
- Conducted the string parts in the recording session of "Rakkaus on lumivalkoinen" ("Love is White Like the Snow") by the top selling Finnish rock band Yö. The song was one of the biggest hits in Finland in 2003. Released by Poko Records, Finland.
- The symphony orchestra arrangements and conducting for the Christmas carol album Joulun juhlaa, talven tunnelmaa (released by Warner Music Finland, performer Pasi Kaunisto) in 2005. Puranen conducted Pärnu Symphony Orchestra in Estonia, the neighboring country to Finland, where the album was recorded.

== Compositions, lyrics and/or arrangements ==
- The Finnish copyright bureau TEOSTO has registered 308 compositions with Mr. Puranen appearing as a composer, lyricist and/or arranger. At the moment the composer is very interested in creating some new classical and religious material.

== Classical compositions ==
- Echoarelle, op. 5 - An impressionistic chamber music miniature composition for flute & harp.
- Adagio di Gianna, op. 6 - A romantic, small composition for string orchestra, flute, oboe & harp.
- Puro, op. 7 - A chamber music composition for flute & harp.
- Sielunkumppani, op. 2 - A Viennese waltz for barytone singer and symphony orchestra.
- Sapere Aude, op. 1 - A hymn for singer and organ

== Religious compositions ==
During the year 2007 Puranen has begun to compose more classical and religious music:

- Herran kasvojen edessä, op. 3 - for vocalist and organ/piano
- Future, here we come! op.4 - A wedding march for organ

these two are composed to be performed in churches during wedding ceremonies.

- On the Trails of St. Paul, op. 9 - A soundtrack composition for choir, string orchestra & tubular bells.
- Autuaaksijulistus, op. 10 - sekakuorolle SATB & uruille (Matthew. 5:3)

== Studies ==
Studies in recording and music production in the Sibelius Academy, Helsinki, in the beginning of the 1990s. Orchestra conducting studies in Sibelius Academy, as a private student of maestro Jorma Panula. Puranen's debut concert as a classical music conductor took place 20 September 2006 in Kosice, Slovakia with the Slovak State Philharmonic.

== Awards ==
Song "Does She Really Love You?" was awarded by a Bronze Prize at the Global Music Awards Competition (USA) 15 September 2017 at the song category.
