= Leppänen =

Leppänen is a Finnish surname. It can be both a traditional surname and a new, acquired surname of Virtanen type derived from the word leppä. Notable people with the surname include:

- Antti Leppänen (1947–2015), Finnish ice hockey player
- Glory Leppänen (1901–1979), Finnish actress, director and writer
- Kaisu Leppänen (1904–1993), Finnish actress
- Kari Leppänen (born 1945), Finnish comic strip artist
- Reijo Leppänen (born 1951), Finnish ice hockey player
- Sulo Leppänen (1916–2015), Finnish wrestler
- Vesa Leppänen (born 1951), Finnish wheelchair curler
