= Paananen =

Paananen is a Finnish surname. Notable people with the surname include:

- Adiel Paananen (1897–1968), Finnish cross-country skier
- Aleksi Paananen (born 1993), Finnish footballer
- Ilmo Paananen (1927–2014), Finnish civil servant and politician
