= Kainulainen (surname) =

Kainulainen is a Finnish surname. Notable people with the surname include:

- Heikki Kainulainen (1917–2005), Finnish farmer and politician
- Markus Kainulainen (1922–2017), Finnish politician
- Jari Kainulainen (born 1970), Finnish bass guitarist
