= Tahkovuori =

Tourist attraction in Kuopio, Finland

Coordinates: 63.28990°N 28.04050°E

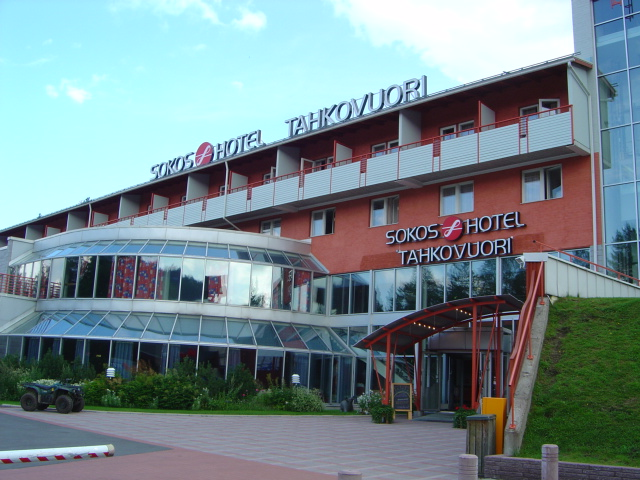
Sokos Hotel Tahkovuori

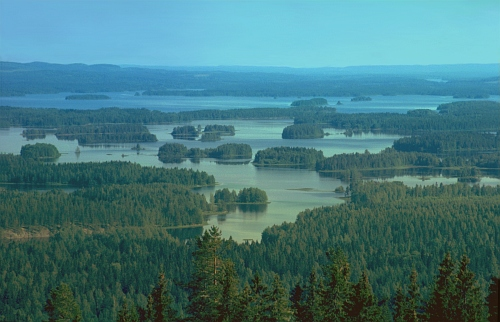
A view of Lake Syväri from Tahkovuori

Tahkovuori, also known as Tahko, is a resort located in the city of Kuopio, Finland. It is about 70 kilometers north of the city centre and is open all year round.

Tahko is a small town with restaurants and winter sports facilities. The nearby areas of Nilsiä and Northeast Savonia have hundreds of kilometers of marked snowmobile routes. There is also a forest conservation area of Huutavanholma to the southwest of the city; the woods can be traversed by a hiking trail.

An abandoned strip mining area nearby is now transformed into a venue for opera performances.

== Accommodations ==
There are 8,500 beds in the resort in vacation homes, apartment hotels, and hotels. There are some cottage complexes : Tahko hills, Tahko Golden Resort

== Activities ==
There are a lot of activities in Tahko resort: Tahko Zipline is the longest zipline in Finland Tahko Bike park
