= Huopanankoski =

Fishing rapids in Viitasaari, Finland

Coordinates: 63°02.8′N 25°31.7′E

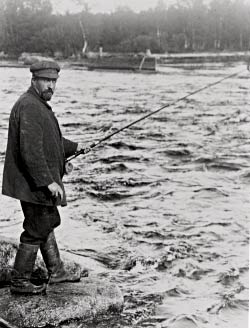
Author Juhani Aho fishing in Huopanankoski in the year 1912

Huopanankoski (meaning: Huopana rapids) is a popular fishing rapids in Central Finland with cultural heritage landscape. Sport fishing has been practised in these waters since the 1800s. The rapids became famous due to the Finnish author and journalist Juhani Aho, who wrote popular short stories of his flyfishing experiences there.

Huopana is located on the waterway from Lake Kivijärvi to Lake Keitele. The rapids consist of a narrow forked stream flowing from Lake Vuosjärvi to Lake Muuruejärvi with a total elevation difference of 6.5 metres (21 ft). The left fork of the rapids is in a nearly natural state. The right fork has been slightly modified for log floating. In the village, there is also an old power station, a mill and an old road bridge. The Huopana village is situated at the lower part of the rapids.

The fishing season runs from January 1 to September 10 and from November 16 to December 31. The natural catch species are brown trout, ide, grayling and whitefish. Stocked species are brown trout and grayling.
