= Lake Syväri =

Lake of Northern Savonia region, Finland

- View from Tahkovuori
- Interactive map of Lake Syväri
- Coordinates: 63°17′N 28°06′E
- Primary inflows: Nurmijoki
- Catchment area: Vuoksi
- Basin countries: Finland
- Surface area: 80.736 km^{2} (31.172 sq mi)
- Average depth: 6.99 m (22.9 ft)
- Max. depth: 41 m (135 ft)
- Water volume: 0.57 km^{3} (460,000 acre⋅ft)
- Shore length^{1}: 460.27 km (286.00 mi)
- Surface elevation: 95.5 m (313 ft)
- Frozen: December–April
- Islands: Keinolansaari (151 ha), Aholansaari (147 ha), Horsma (97 ha) ja Autio (91 ha)
- Settlements: Nilsiä
- ^{1} Shore length is not a well-defined measure.

Lake Syväri (Finnish: Syväri) is a medium-sized lake in Finland. It is located in the Northern Savonia region in Finland, in the municipalities of Kuopio and Lapinlahti. The lake belongs to the Vuoksi main catchment area.

== See also ==
- List of lakes in Finland
