= Lake Kivijärvi (Central Finland) =

Lake in Kannonkoski, Kivijärvi and Kinnula, Central Finland, Finland

Kivijärvi
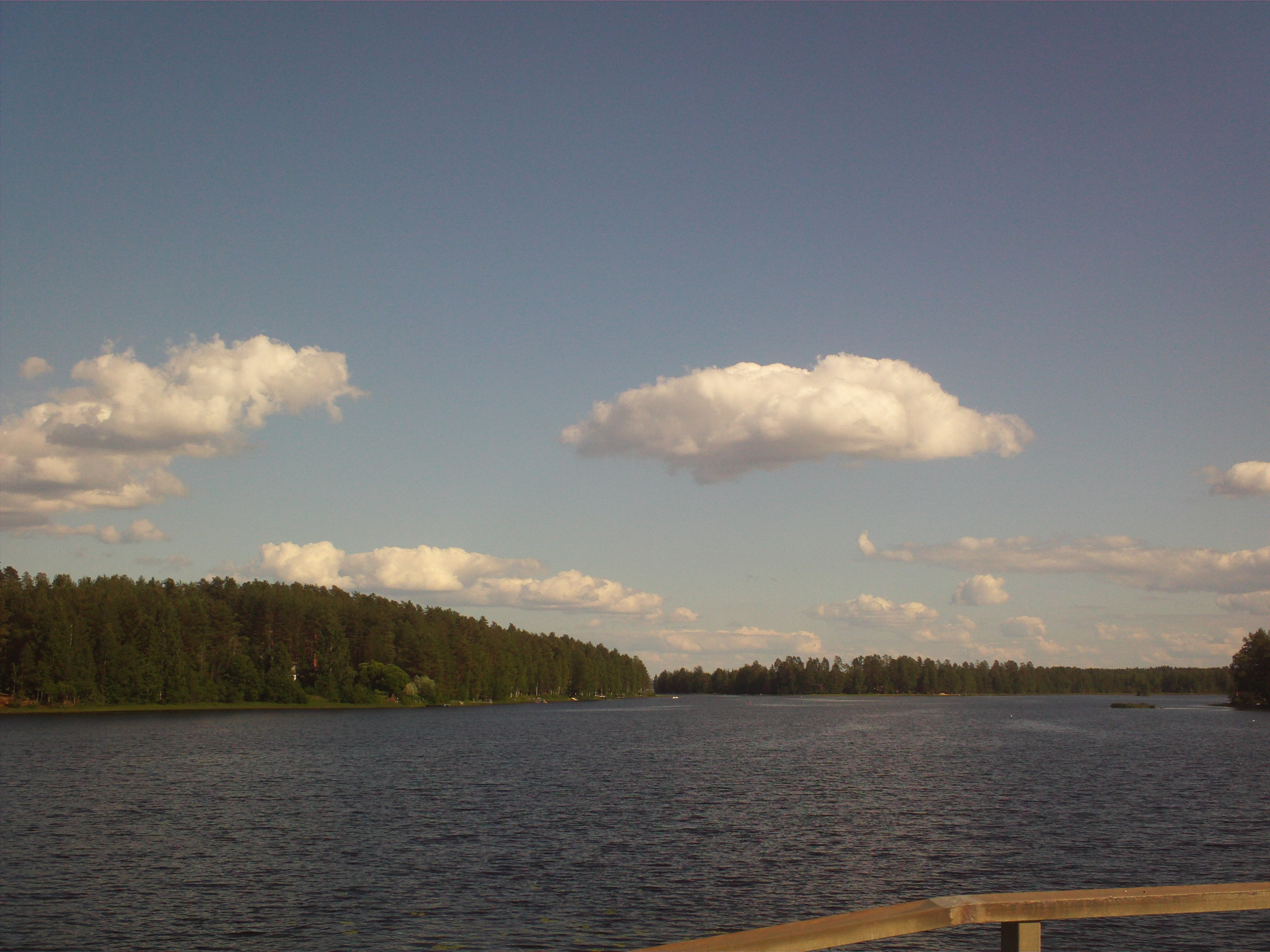

- Location within Finland

- Location: Central Finland
- Coordinates: 63°07′N 025°11′E
- Lake type: Natural
- Catchment area: 1,739 km^{2} (671 sq mi)
- Basin countries: Finland
- Max. length: 50 km (31 mi)
- Max. width: 10 km (6.2 mi)
- Surface area: 154.03 km^{2} (59.47 sq mi)
- Average depth: 8.36 m (27.4 ft)
- Max. depth: 45 m (148 ft)
- Water volume: 1.294 km^{3} (0.310 cu mi)
- Shore length^{1}: 544.5 km (338.3 mi)
- Surface elevation: 130.8 m (429 ft)
- Islands: Lehtosaari, Lammassaari, Naurissaari
- Settlements: Kannonkoski, Kivijärvi, Kinnula
- ^{1} Shore length is not a well-defined measure.

Kivijärvi is a rather large lake in Finland. The name Kivijärvi is rather common and there are 121 lakes with the same name. This is the biggest of them. The lake is located in the Central Finland region. It is 30th biggest lake in Finland. It is a good lake for fishing. For example, a 10.1 kg (22 lb) lake trout was caught in Kivijärvi lake in summer 2001.
