= Kivach Nature Reserve =

Strict nature reserve in the Republic of Karelia, Russia

- Russian: Кивач заповедник
- IUCN category Ia (strict nature reserve)
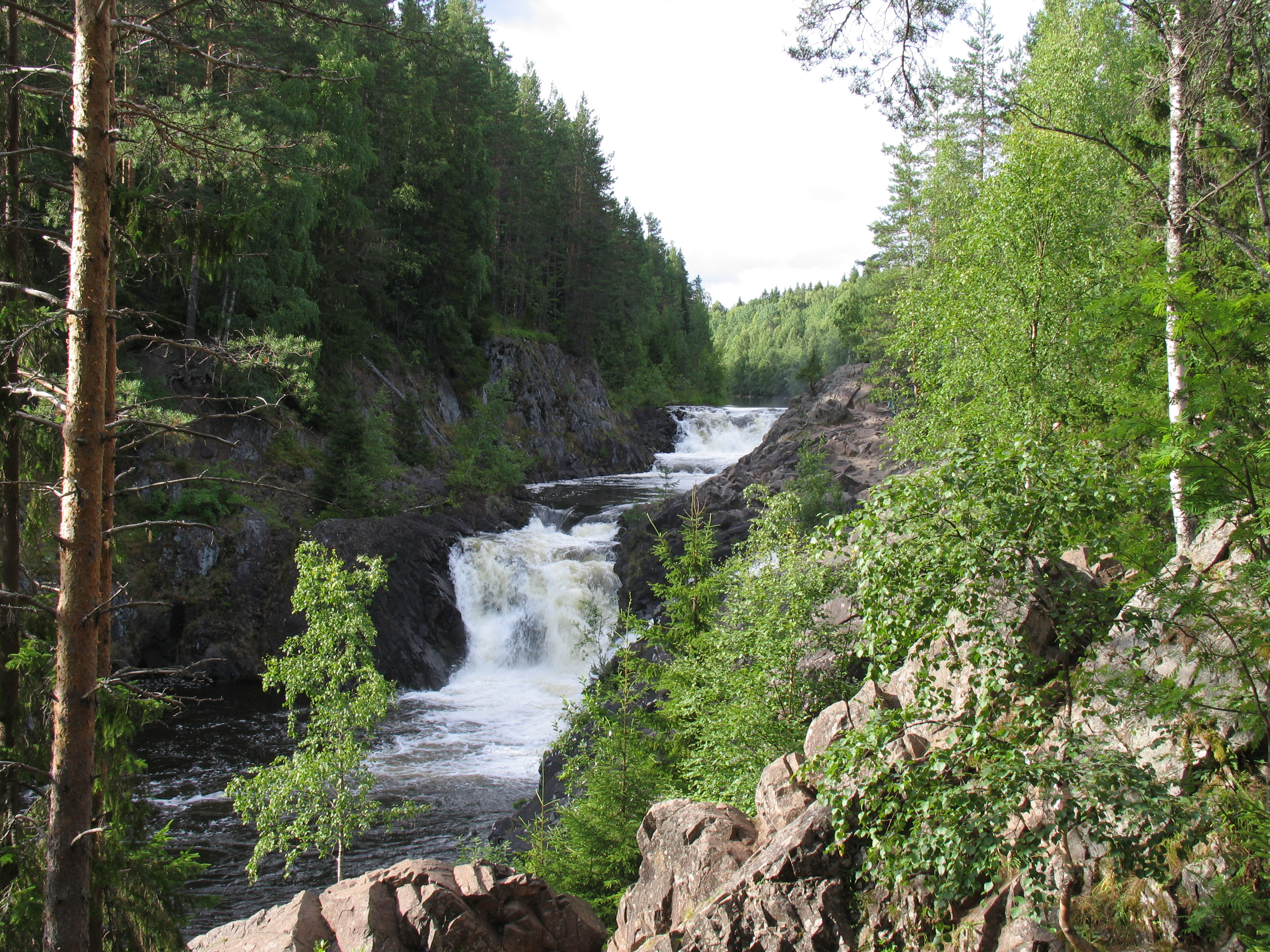
- Kivach Zapovednik

- Location within Russia
- Location: Republic of Karelia
- Nearest city: Kondopoga
- Coordinates: 62°20′0″N 33°55′0″E
- Area: 10,880 hectares (26,885 acres; 42 sq mi)
- Established: 1931
- Governing body: Ministry of Natural Resources and Environment (Russia)
- Website: https://www.zapkivach.ru/

Kivach Nature Reserve (Russian: Кивач заповедник) (also Kivach) is a Russian 'zapovednik' (strict nature reserve) established in 1931 to study and protect taiga of the Republic of Karelia. The site includes the famous 10.4 meter Kivach waterfall on the Suna River. The reserve is situated about 20 km northwest of the town of Kondopoga in the Kondopozhsky District. It covers an area of 10,880 ha (42.0 sq mi).

== Topography ==
The Kivach Reserve covers lake and forest territory just to the northwest of Lake Onega, where the terrain is rockier and more rugged than along the main shores of the lake. The Suna River runs through the reserve, over a ridge of Precambrian Diabase to create the waterfall for which the reserve is best known. The waterfall is diminished from its former size due to the construction of a dam upstream. The reserve's terrain is found in three main types: rocky ridges (the highest point is 160 meters above sea level), hilly glacial moraines, and Quaternary glacial-lake plains.

== Climate and ecoregion ==
Kivach is located in the Scandinavian and Russian taiga ecoregion, which covers Northern Europe between tundra in the north and temperate mixed forests in the south. It is covers parts of Norway, Sweden, Finland and the northern part of European Russia, being the largest ecoregion in Europe. The ecoregion is characterized by coniferous forests dominated by Pinus sylvestris (in drier locations), often with an understory of Juniperus communis, Picea abies and Picea obovata and a significant admixture of Betula pubescens and Betula pendula.

The climate of Kivach is Humid continental climate, cool summer (Köppen climate classification (Dfc)). This climate is characterized by long cold winters, and short, cool summers.

mean July temperature: 17°C
mean January temp: -10.7°C
mean annual precipitation: 619 mm
frost-free period: 104-153 days
mean snow cover by the end of winter: 83 cm (lasts for 143 days on average)

== Flora and fauna ==
Vascular plants: 569 species, 239 genera, 85 families
Mammals: 48 species
Birds: 197 species
Reptiles: 3 species
Amphibians: 5 species
Fishes: 18 species

== Gallery ==
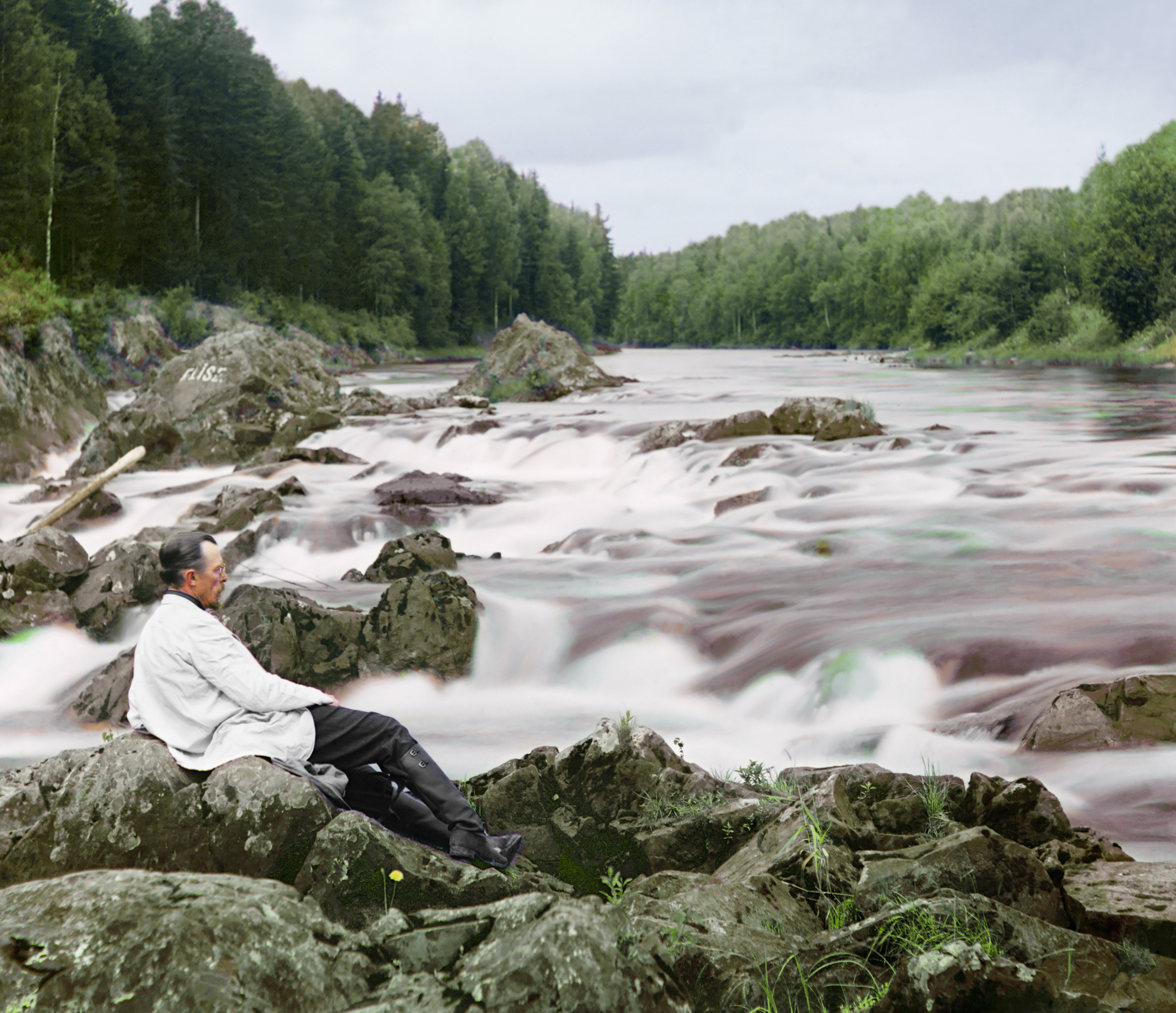
Sergey Prokudin-Gorsky in 1915 at the Kivach waterfall

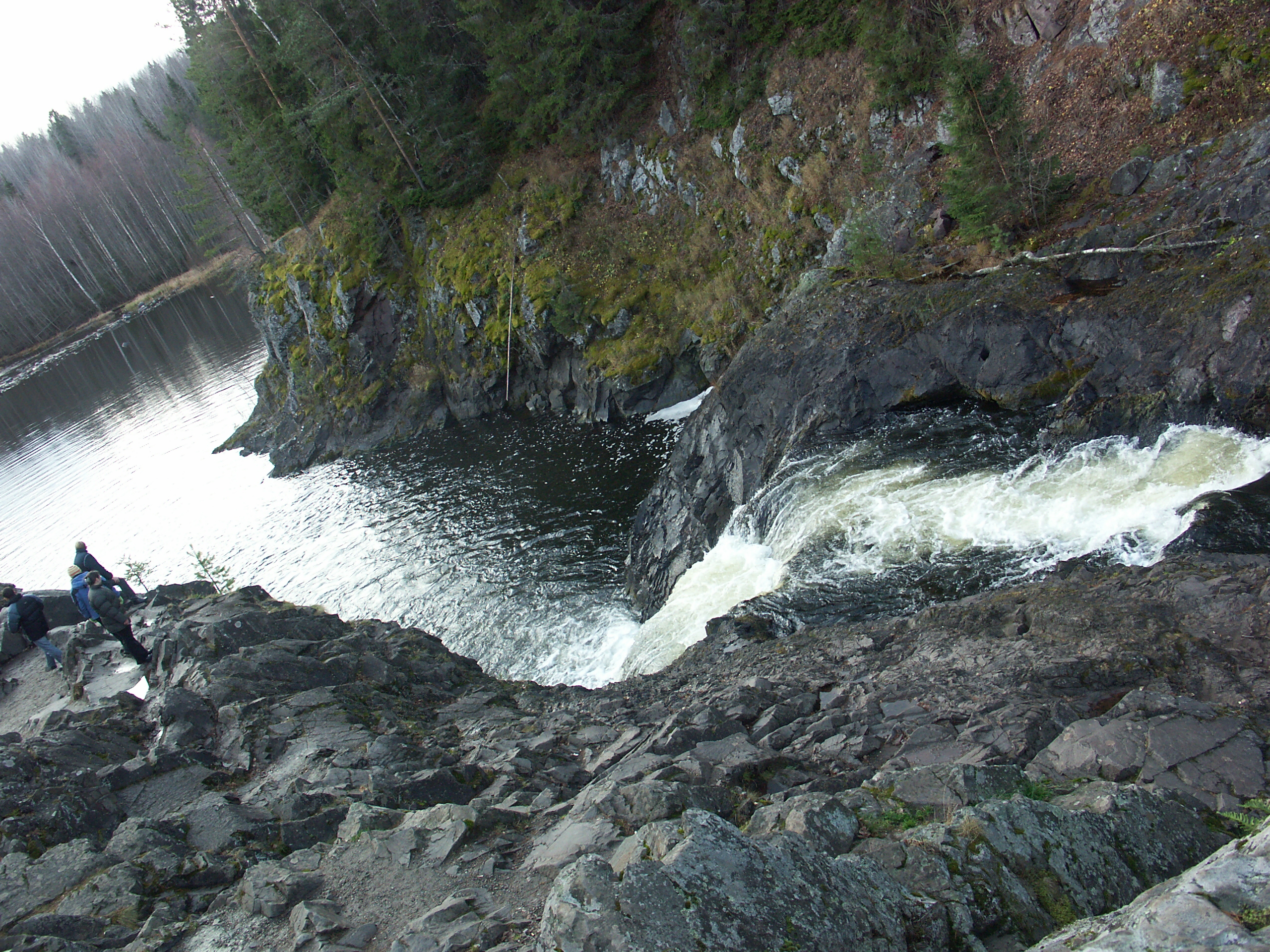

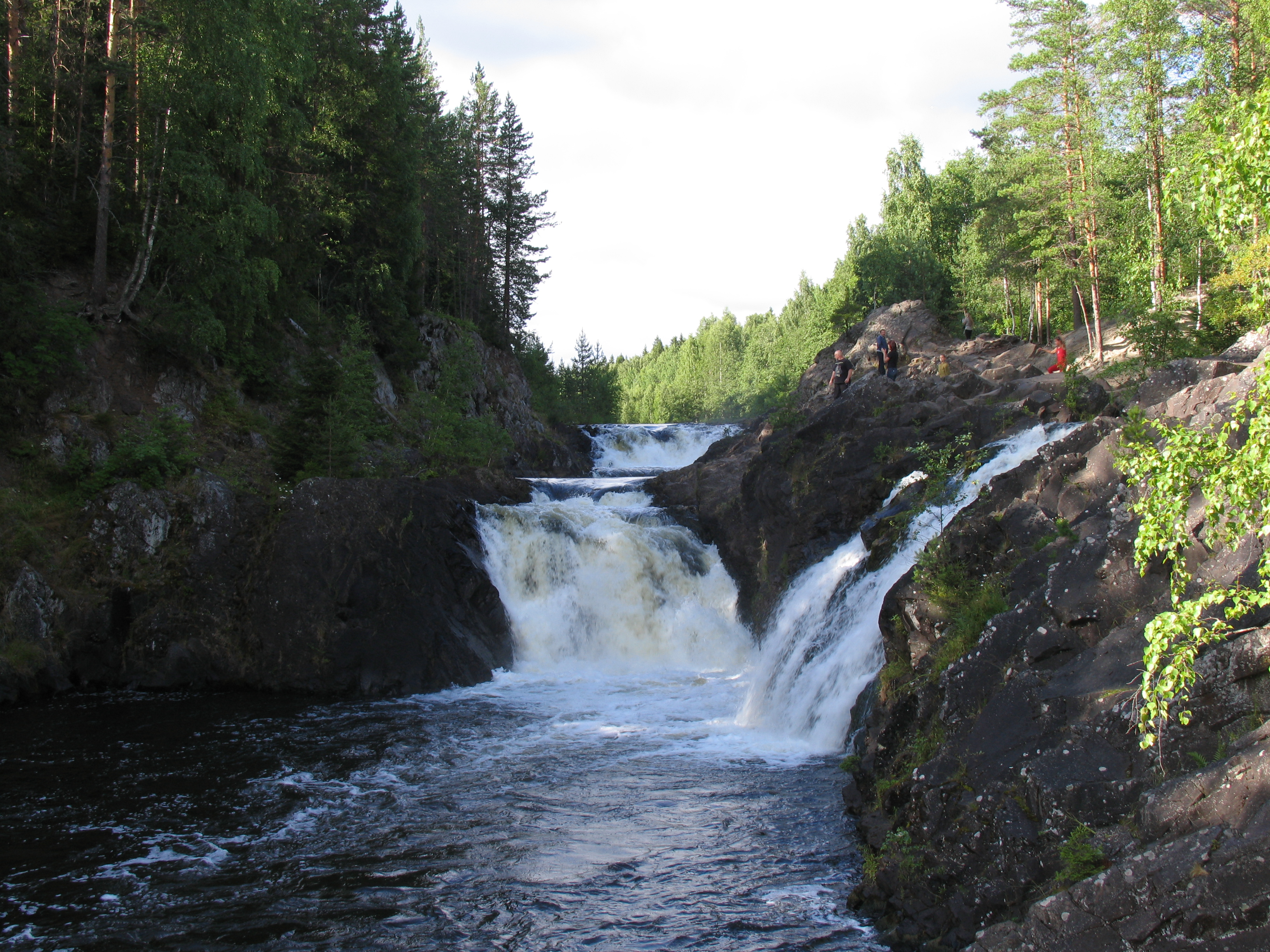

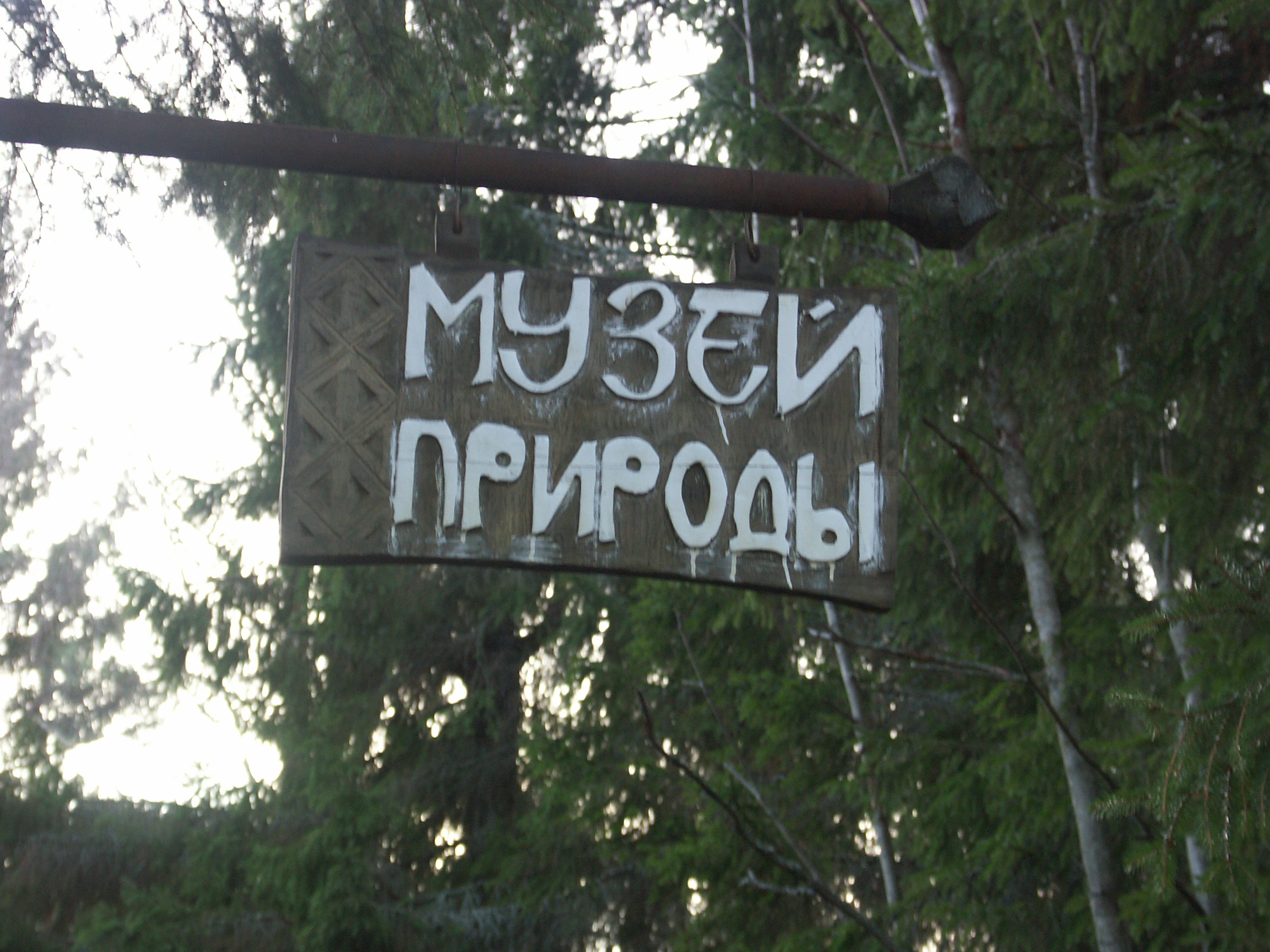

== Ecoeducation and access ==
As a strict nature reserve, the Kivach Reserve is mostly closed to the general public. There is, however, a "public excursion zone" that is open year round to public tourists for visits to the waterfall, a nature museum, and a monument to fallen soldiers of the Great Patriotic War. Trails in the public zone have informational signs and basic facilities. The main office is in the town of Kivach.

== See also ==
- List of Russian Nature Reserves (class 1a 'zapovedniks')
- National Parks of Russia
