= Viitasaari =

- Town
- Viitasaaren kaupunki Viitasaari stad
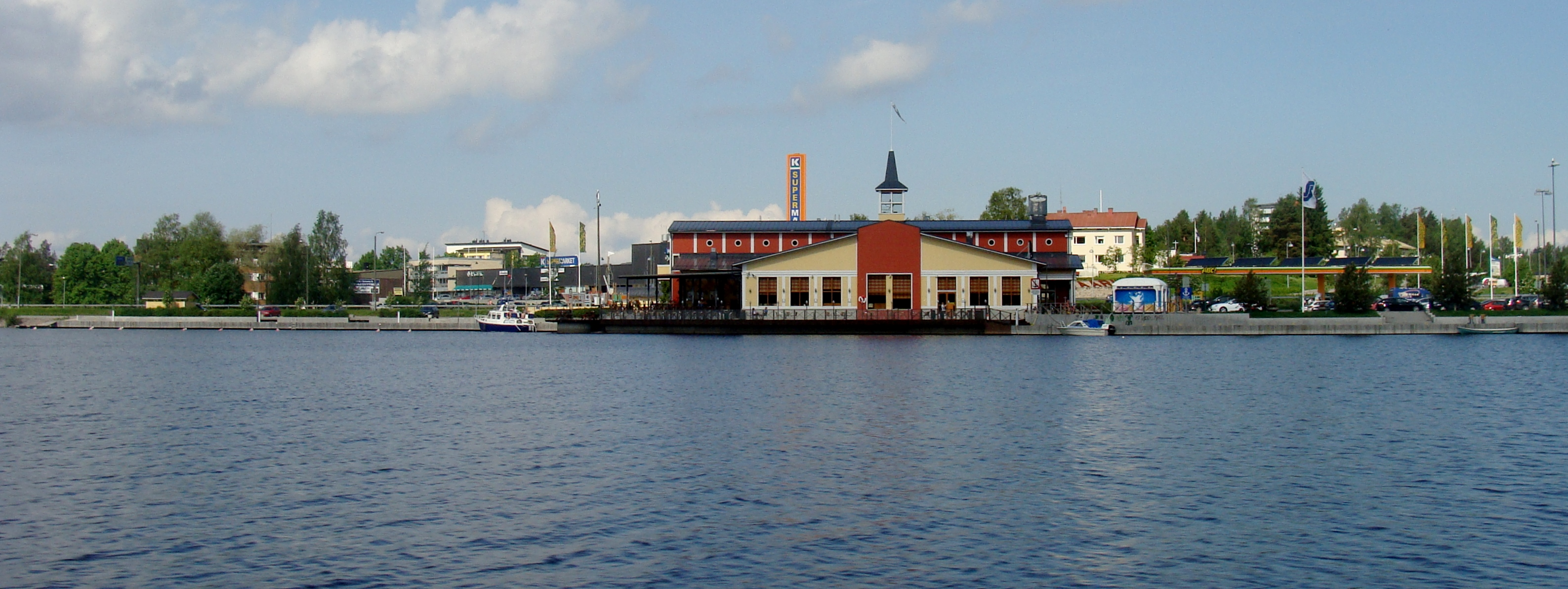

- Flag Coat of arms

- Location of Viitasaari in Finland
- Interactive map of Viitasaari
- Coordinates: 63°04′30″N 025°51′35″E
- Country: Finland
- Region: Central Finland
- Sub-region: Saarijärvi–Viitasaari sub-region
- Charter: 1635
- Town privileges: 1996

Government
  - Municipal manager: Helena Vuopionperä-Kovanen

Area (2018-01-01)
  - Total: 1,589.13 km^{2} (613.57 sq mi)
  - Land: 1,248.53 km^{2} (482.06 sq mi)
  - Water: 340.43 km^{2} (131.44 sq mi)
  - Rank: 59th largest in Finland
- Elevation: 140 m (460 ft)

Population (2025-12-31)
  - Total: 5,695
  - Rank: 158th largest in Finland
  - Density: 4.56/km^{2} (11.8/sq mi)

Population by native language
  - Finnish: 97.5% (official)
  - Others: 2.5%

Population by age
  - 0 to 14: 11.6%
  - 15 to 64: 51.9%
  - 65 or older: 36.5%
- Time zone: UTC+02:00 (EET)
  - Summer (DST): UTC+03:00 (EEST)
- Postal code: 44500
- Area code: (+358) 01
- Website: viitasaari.fi

Viitasaari is a Finnish town and municipality located in the Central Finland region. It is located between the neighbouring municipalities of Pihtipudas to the north and Äänekoski to the south. The town has a population of 5,695 (31 December 2025) and covers an area of 1,589.13 square kilometres (613.57 sq mi) of which 340.43 km^{2} (131.44 sq mi), or 21%, is water. There are altogether 230 lakes in Viitasaari. The biggest lakes are Lake Keitele, Lake Kolima and Muuruejärvi. The population density is 4.56 inhabitants per square kilometre (11.8/sq mi).

The municipality is unilingually Finnish.

== Politics ==
Results of the 2023 Finnish parliamentary election in Viitasaari:

- Social Democratic Party 31.2%
- Centre Party 24.6%
- Finns Party 20.5%
- National Coalition Party 7.9%
- Christian Democrats 6.7%
- Left Alliance 4.2%
- Green League 2.3%

== Sister cities ==
The following cities or municipalities are twinned with Viitasaari:

- Nõo Parish, Estonia
- Staffanstorp Municipality, Sweden
- Storuman Municipality, Sweden
- Sør-Odal Municipality, Norway
- Schlangen, Germany
- Rokietnica, Poland

== See also ==
- Blue Highway, an international tourist route
- Huopanankoski, a rapids in the Huopana village
