= Kondopoga (disambiguation) =

Kondopoga is a town in the Republic of Karelia, Russia

Kondopoga may also refer to:

- OAO Kondopoga, a cellulose and paper production company in the Republic of Karelia, Russia
- Kondopoga Hydroelectric Station, a power station in Russia
- FC Kondopoga, a soccer team in the Russian Amateur Football League
- Russian landing ship Kondopoga, a ship of the Russian Navy
- Kondopoga Bay, Russia
