= Marat Tarasov =

Russian poet and translator (1930–2021)

- Born: 1 September 1930; Kondopoga, Karelian ASSR, Russian SFSR
- Died: 4 March 2021 (aged 90)
- Occupations: Poet; Translator

Marat Tarasov (Russian: Мара́т Тара́сов; 1 September 1930 – 4 March 2021) was a Russian poet, translator, and journalist. He was an Honored Cultural Worker of the Karelian Autonomous Soviet Socialist Republic, an Honored Worker of Culture of the Russian Federation, and a People's Writer of the Republic of Karelia.

== Biography ==
Tarasov was born into a family of peasants from the village of Lizhma in the Kondopozhsky District. His father, who worked at a power station in Kondopoga, was executed in 1932. During World War II, his family evacuated to Vologda Oblast.

In 1951, Tarasov published his first poem in the journal Sever. In 1953, he graduated from Petrozavodsk State University and from Maxim Gorky Literature Institute in 1954. That year, he published his first poetry collection and was admitted to the Union of Soviet Writers in 1955. From 1954 to 1959, he served as head of the poetry department at Sever. From 1959 to 1967, he served as executive secretary of the Writers' Union of the Karelian Autonomous Soviet Socialist Republic. He translated works by Karelian writers into Russian, such as Jalmari Virtanen, Nikolai Laine, and Jaakko Rugojev. From 2003 to 2017, he was head of the Karelian Union of Writers. He lived in Petrozavodsk in his later life.

Marat Tarasov died on 4 March 2021 at the age of 90.
