= Kondopozhsky =

Kondopozhsky (masculine), Kondopozhskaya (feminine), or Kondopozhskoye (neuter) may refer to:

- Kondopozhsky District, a district of the Republic of Karelia, Russia
- Kondopozhskoye Urban Settlement, a municipal formation which the town of Kondopoga and three rural localities in Kondopozhsky District of the Republic of Karelia, Russia are incorporated as
