= Dormition Church, Kondopoga =

Coordinates: 62°10′32″N 34°17′2″E

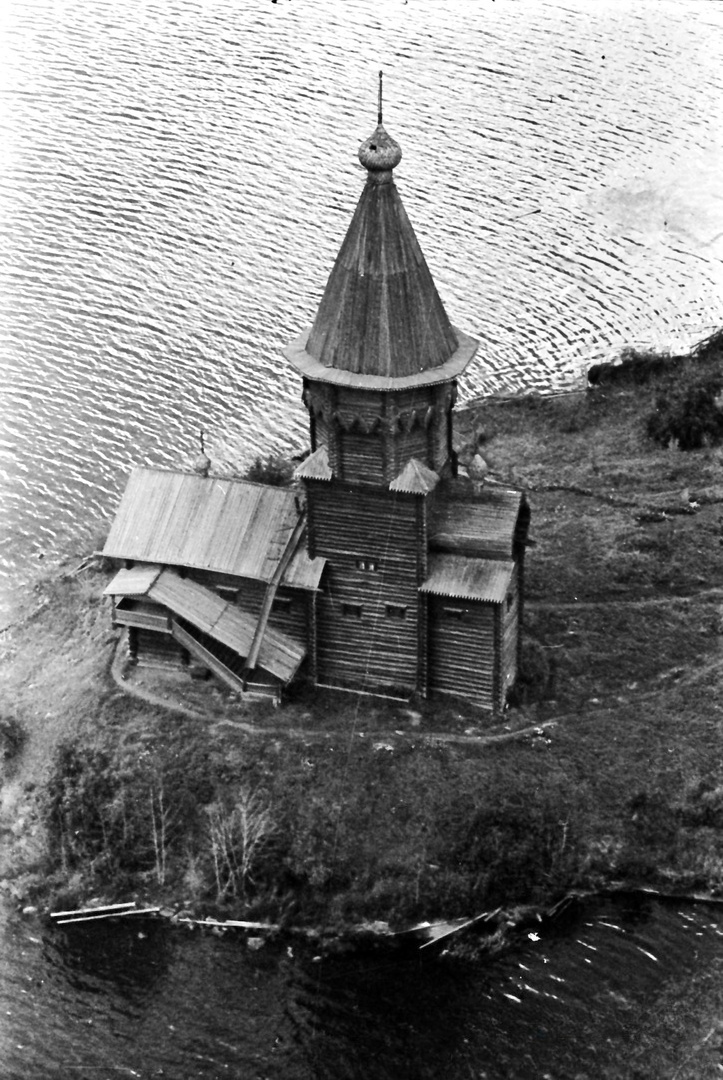
View of the church in 1989

Dormition Church of Kondopoga (Russian: Це́рковь Успе́ния Пресвято́й Богоро́дицы) was a Russian Orthodox Church in the town of Kondopoga, Kondopozhsky District of the Republic of Karelia. The church was located in the historic part of the town, in the former village of Kondopoga, on the shores of Lake Onega, in Kondopozhskaya Bay on a promontory jutting into Chupa Bay. At 42 meters, the church was the tallest wooden structure in Karelia. The height of the tent and log towers, two octagons and the quadrangle, and the quadrangular height and width are in the ratio of about 1:2.

The Dormition Church was a monument of the Russian wooden architecture; it was a cultural heritage site of federal significance, part of the Zaonezhskaya branch of the Kondoparchozhsky City Museum. During the holidays of the Eastern Orthodox Church, services were held, mostly in the summer. Regular services were instead held in the separate Church of the Meeting of the Lord (Candlemas), which had been rebuilt by a local architect employed at the transformer station.

The Dormition Church was totally destroyed by fire on 10 August 2018. It had been one of the most important landmarks of Kondopoga.

== History ==
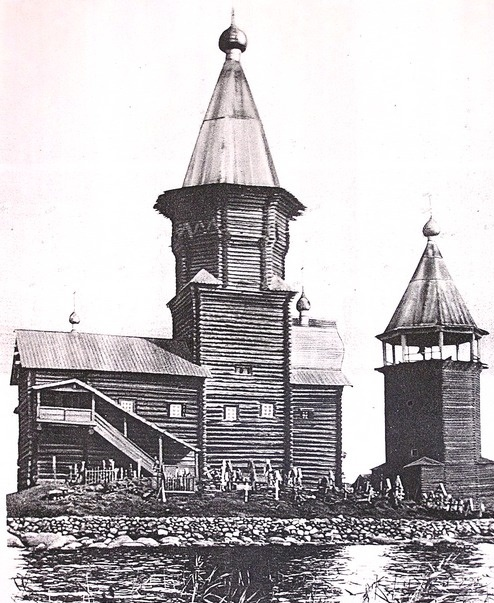
The Dormition Church and bell tower at the beginning of the 20th century

The church was built in 1774 in the style of Russian wooden architecture. This structure, measuring 42 meters in height, 24 meters in length, and 14.6 meters in width, represented the pinnacle of 18th-century srub (log cell) construction techniques, featuring horizontal logs joined with traditional corner notches for stability, topped by a multi-tiered pitched roof that combined barrel-shaped elements and possible domes, characteristic of the Prionezhskaya school's hip or tent-style designs. The church was built in memory of the victims participating in the Kizhi uprising, which included farmers and township Kondopozhskaya.

In the years 1829–1831, next to the Church of the Dormition, a wooden tower was built, at the expense of the parishioners, and in 1857 the winter Church of the Nativity of the Virgin. The bell tower was demolished in 1930, and the winter church in 1960.

According to the Decree of 23 January 1918 "On the separation of church and state" and instruction in 1920 and the People's Commissariat Department of Museums "on its application", all church property "passed into the facilities management department for museums, conservation of works of art and antiquities Commissariat".

An important early survey took place in August 1926 during the Onega Expedition, which aimed to document and evaluate wooden architecture in northern Russia. The expedition, headed by art historian and restorer Igor Emmanuilovich Grabar, included architect Pavel Dmitrievich Baranovsky, restorer Grigory Osipovich Chirikov, architect Nikolai Nikolaevich Pomerantsev, and photographer Alexei Vasilievich Lyadov. Their assessment emphasized the church's architectural significance and guided later preservation efforts.

The Church was not rebuilt, but was restored in 1927, in 1950 and in 1999.

In the summer of 1960 the Council of Ministers of the RSFSR placed the church under state protection.

=== Lost buildings ===
Near the Assumption Church there were two wooden buildings that disappeared in the Soviet era: the winter Church of the Nativity of the Virgin (1857, demolished in 1930) and the belfry (18th century, demolished in 1960).

== 2018 destruction and aftermath ==
The church was destroyed by a fire on 10 August 2018. The blaze was reported at 09:33, and by 11:00 the wooden structure had completely burned down; the cause was initially attributed to careless handling of fire.

Post-fire inspections indicated that about 95% of the structure had been destroyed. Restoration was proposed at roughly 100 million rubles (about US$1.5 million in 2018), and the Ministry of Culture initiated preliminary expert studies to reconstruct the building according to historical documentation and surviving fragments. As of 2024, reconstruction had not been carried out.

== Gallery ==
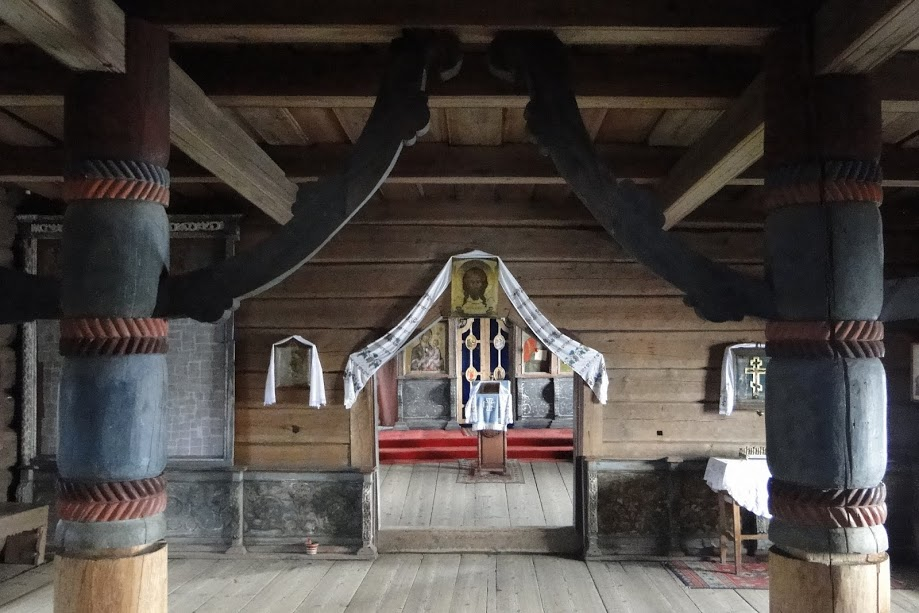
Inner view

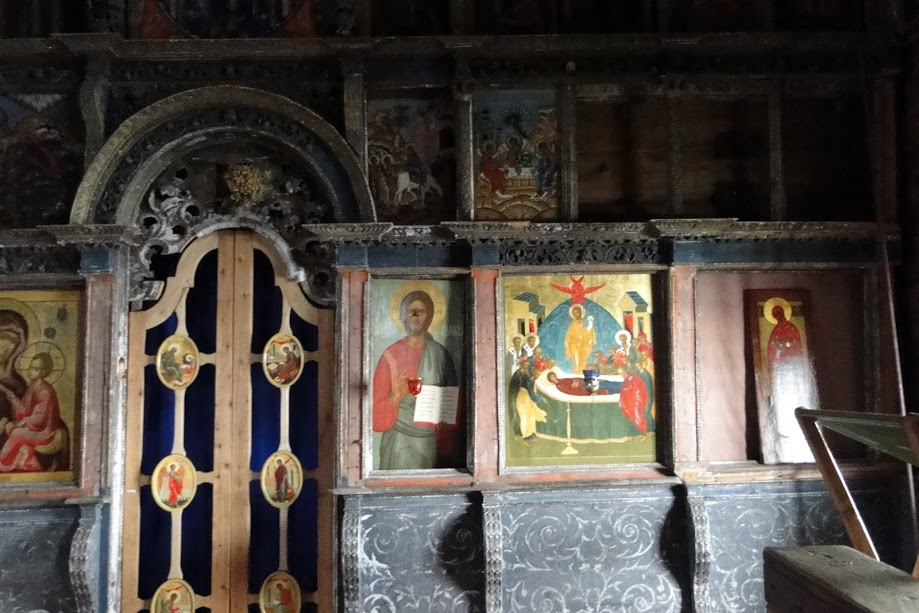
The altar (detail)

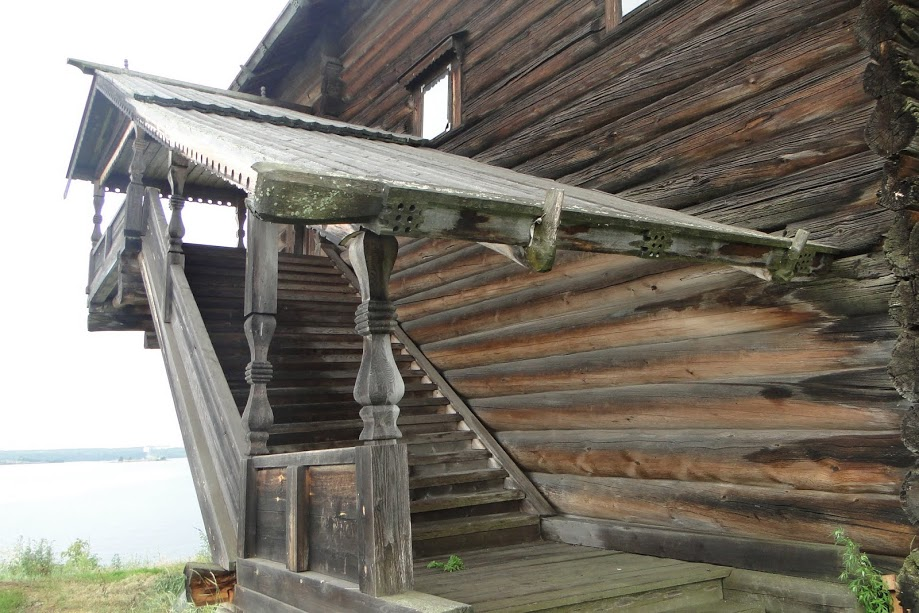
The porch

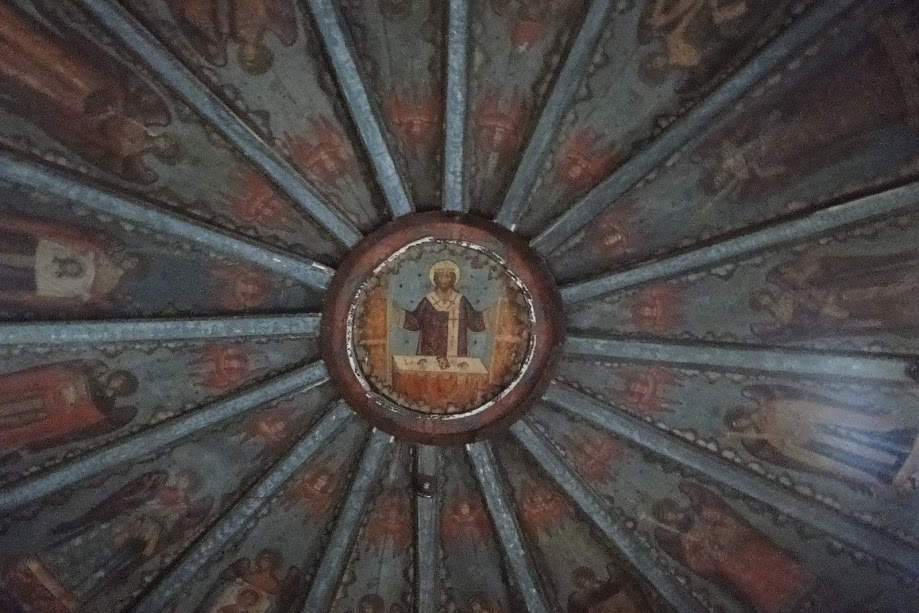
The dome

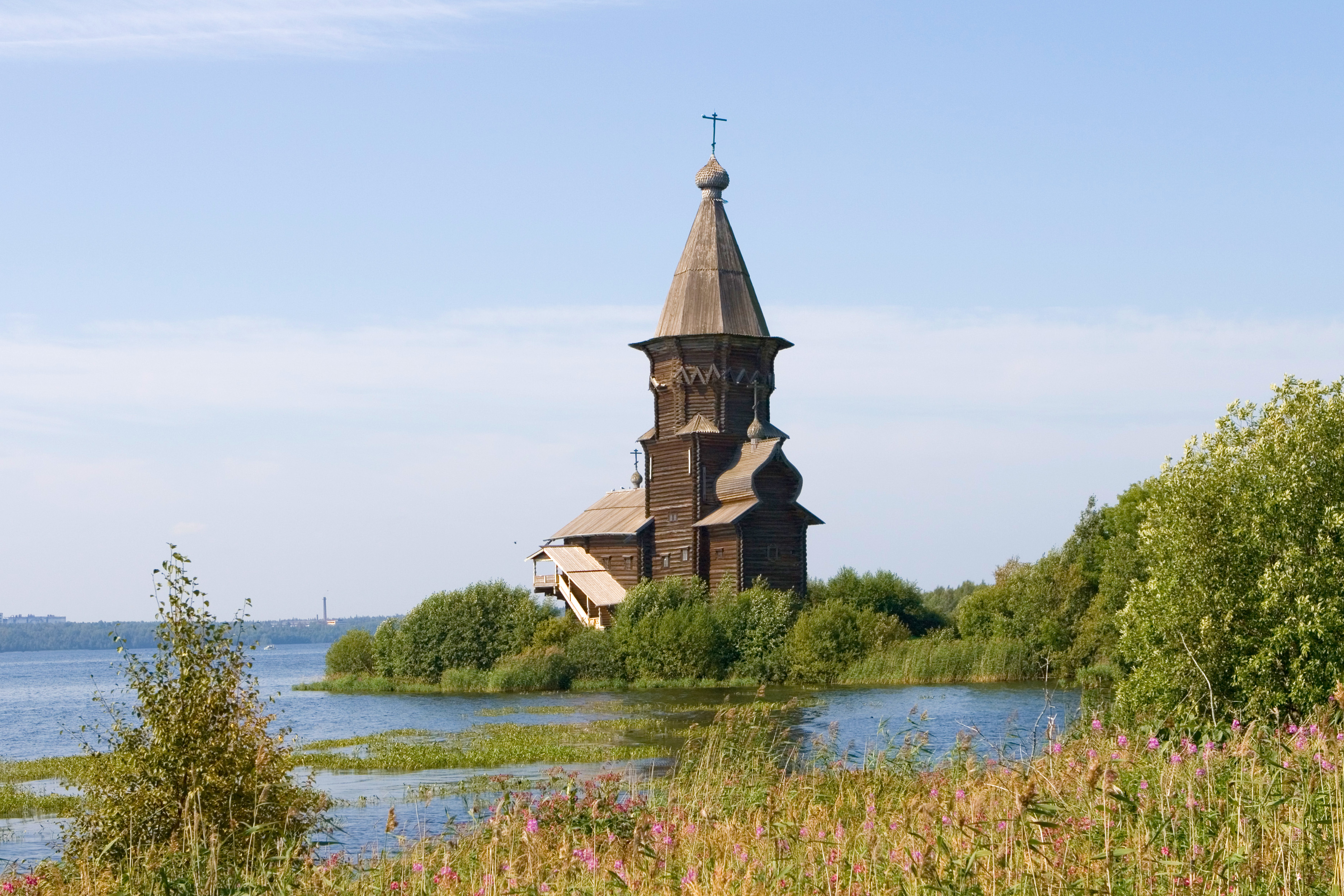
The Church of the Dormition seen in context

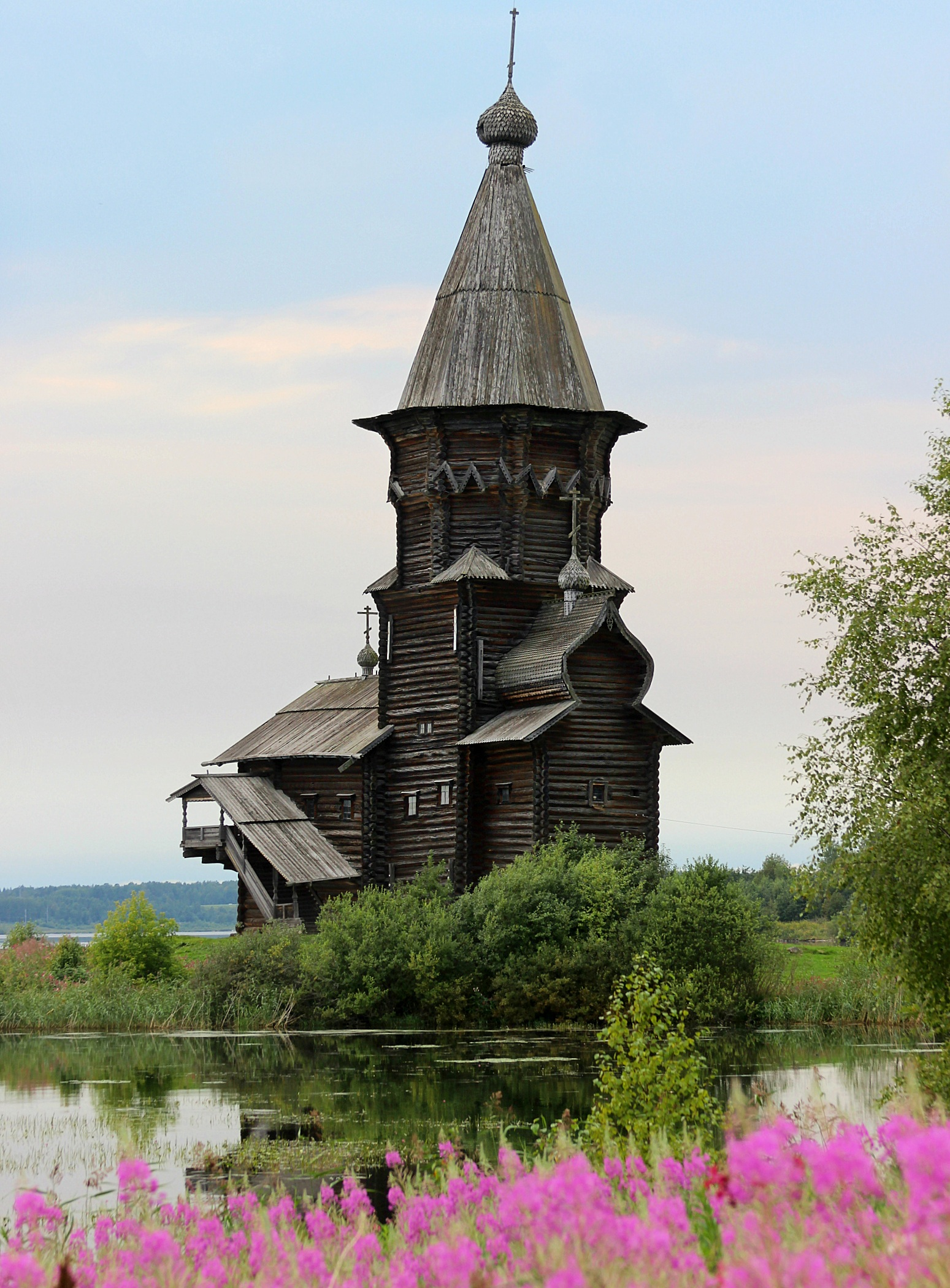
Church of the Dormition, Kondopoga

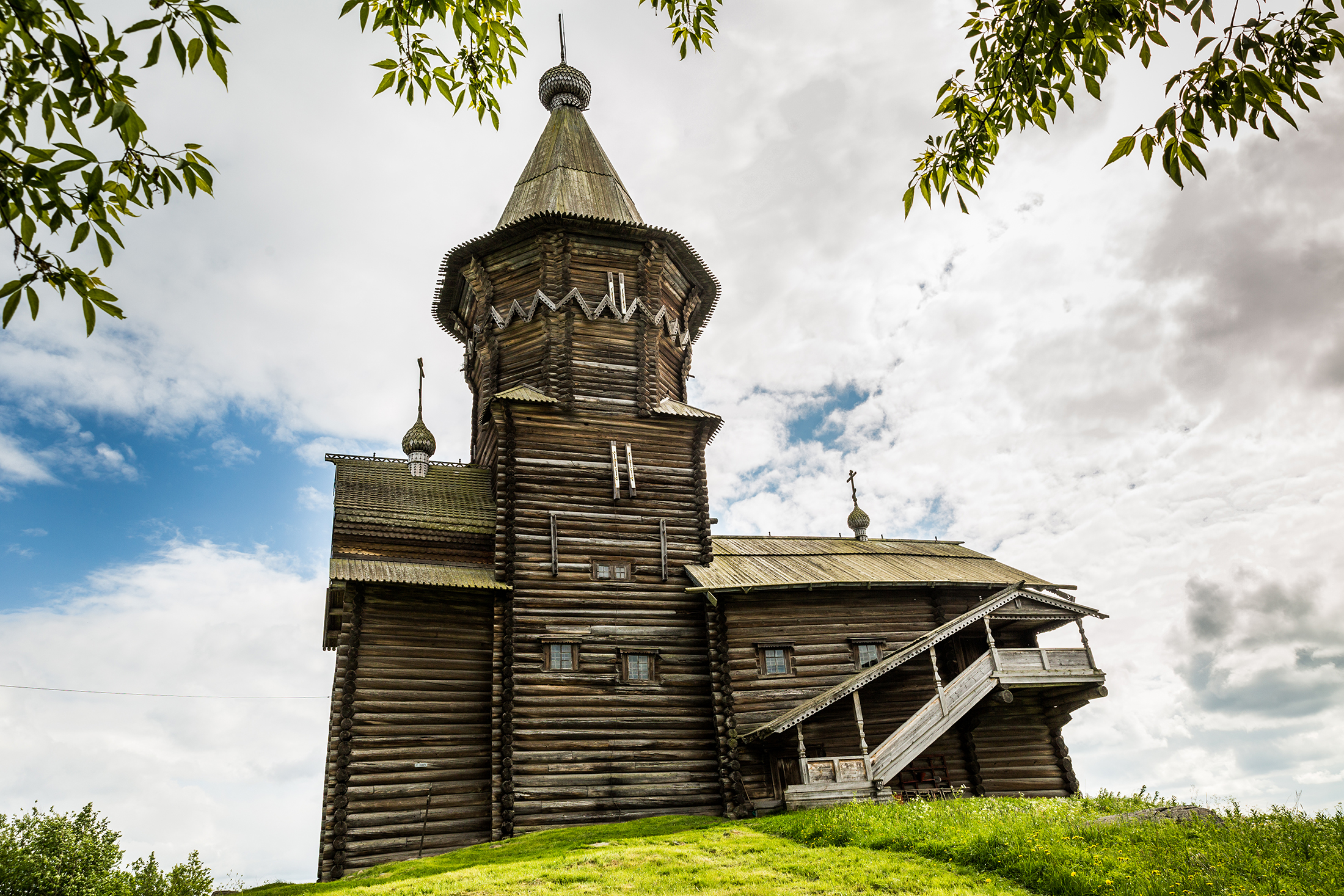
Church of the Dormition - view from the shoreline
