= Kondopoga hydroelectric power station =

Hydroelectric power station in Kondopoga, Russia

Kondopoga Hydroelectric Power Station
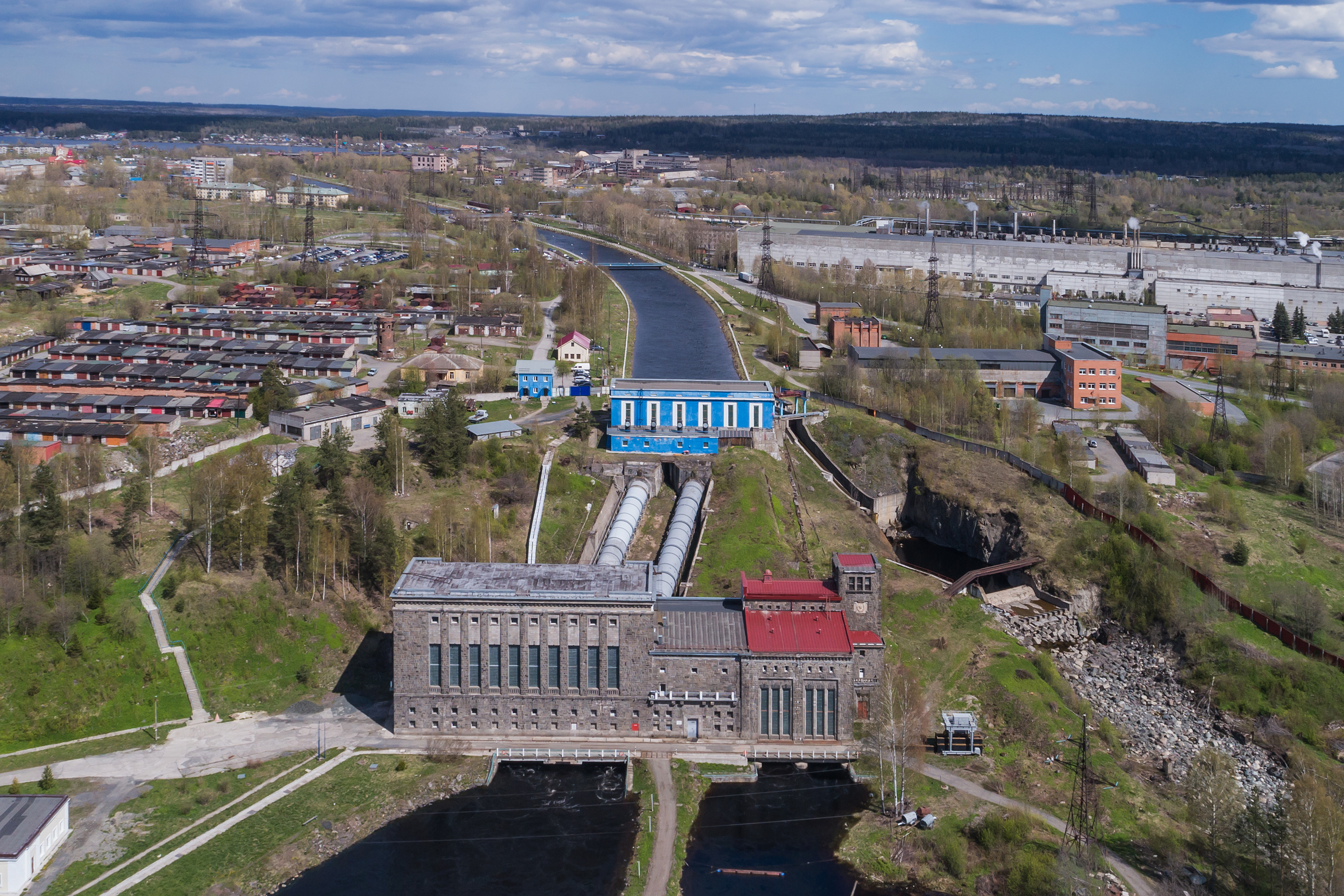
- Country: Russia
- Location: Karelia
- Coordinates: 62°11′41.4″N 34°15′42.3″E
- Status: Operational
- Construction began: 1916
- Commission date: 1929, 1941/1947, 1951
- Owner: TGC-1

Power generation
- Nameplate capacity: 25.6 MW

External links
- Commons: Related media on Commons

Kondopoga hydroelectric power station is a hydroelectric power station in Kondopoga, utilizing the runoff of the Suna River and Lake Sandal in the Kondopozhsky District of the Republic of Karelia. It is part of the Suna Cascade of hydroelectric power stations, serving as its lower stage.

One of Russia's oldest hydroelectric power stations — construction began in 1916, and the station's completion was carried out under the GOELRO plan, with the first hydro unit commissioned in 1929. During the Great Patriotic War, the station was located in occupied territory and was partially destroyed; in the post-war years, it was restored with equipment replacement. The Kondopoga Hydroelectric Power Station is a cultural heritage site of local significance and is protected by the state. The station's owner is Public Joint-Stock Company TGC-1.

== Natural conditions ==
The Kondopoga Hydroelectric Power Station utilizes the runoff of the Suna River, diverted to the Palyeozero Reservoir via the Palyeozero Hydroelectric Power Station, as well as lateral inflow between the two stations (natural inflow into the Palyeozero and Sandal reservoirs). The catchment area at the station's axis is 7,725 km^{2} (2,983 sq mi). In an average water year, the Suna River at the Paleozerskaya Hydroelectric Power Station axis has an average annual flow of 59.3 m3/s, and the lateral inflow between the Paleozerskaya and Kondopoga stations is 10.2 m3/s. The long-term average inflow of Suna water to the Paleozerskaya Hydroelectric Power Station axis is 1879 mill. m3, of which 1806 mill. m3, or 96%, is diverted through the station's turbines and spillway to the lower pool toward the Kondopoga Hydroelectric Power Station. The long-term average volume of lateral inflow between the Paleozerskaya and Kondopoga stations is estimated at 331 mill. m3. The maximum lateral inflow to the Sandal Reservoir (recurrence 0.5%, or once every 200 years) is estimated at 60.6 m3/s; the maximum inflow of water to the Sandal Reservoir from the Palyeozero Reservoir is limited by the channel capacity of the Niva River and amounts to 140 m3/s.

Maximum inflows occur from late May to early June during the spring flood, and minimums in March–April. Ice cover forms in November, and the reservoirs clear of ice in May. The maximum wave height in the Sandal Reservoir can reach 1.36 m. The station complex's structures are founded on bedrock (slates); the seismicity of the Kondopoga Hydroelectric Power Station area is 5 points on the MSK-64 scale.

== Construction ==
Structurally, the Kondopoga Hydroelectric Power Station is a derivation hydroelectric power station with a non-pressurized headrace derivation in the form of a canal, utilizing the elevation difference between the Sandal Reservoir and Lake Onega. The station uses the runoff from Lake Sandal (converted into a regulating reservoir), as well as most of the Suna River runoff diverted to Palyeozero and then to Lake Sandal via the Paleozerskaya Hydroelectric Power Station. The Kondopoga Hydroelectric Power Station facilities include the Navda and Sopokha dam (forming the Palyeozero and Sandal reservoirs, respectively), a derivation canal with headworks, the station complex (forebay, penstocks, powerhouse, spillway, tailrace canal, 110 kV switchyard). The hydroelectric power station's hydraulic structures are Class III capital structures. The station's installed capacity is 24.9 MW (33,400 hp), guaranteed capacity is 9.5 MW (12,700 hp), and the designed average annual electricity generation is 131 mil. kWh. The maximum discharge capacity of the station's structures is 192 m3/s, including through the turbines —120 m3/s— and through the spillway — 72 m3/s.

=== Palyeozero Reservoir ===
The Palyeozero Reservoir was formed by raising the level of Palyeozero with the blind Navda dam. The reservoir serves as the lower pool of the Paleozerskaya Hydroelectric Power Station (into which Suna River waters enter after working through the HPP turbines or passing through its spillway). Water discharge from the Palyeozero Reservoir occurs into the Sandal Reservoir through the natural rivers Niva (Nivka) and Tivdiyka.

The Navda dam is earthen, filled with sand, and has an anti-filtration element — a clay screen. The dam's length is 1500 m, maximum height — 5.4 m, crest width — 7 m, base width — 45 m. The crest elevation is 75.5 m, crest elevation above the normal backwater level of the reservoir — 2 m, head on the dam — 3.4 m. The levee has no water discharge structures; the federal highway Saint Petersburg–Murmansk runs along the dam crest. It was built in 1923–1938 and restored and reconstructed by 1951. Coordinates of the central part of the levee: 62°29′39.6″N 33°49′15.4″E.

At normal backwater level, the Palyeozero Reservoir has an area of 109 km^{2} (42 sq mi), length of 22.6 km, maximum width of 8.8 km, maximum depth of 74 m. The total and useful capacity of the reservoir is 2000.5 and 158.5 mil. m3, respectively. The reservoir is transit; artificial runoff regulation is not performed due to the absence of regulating structures (only natural regulation determined by the discharge capacity of the Niva River outlet). The normal backwater level elevation is 72.5 m above sea level (per the Baltic system of heights), dead storage level—71 m; forced backwater level is not provided.

=== Sandal Reservoir ===
Schematic of the Suna Cascade of HPPs

The Sandal Reservoir was formed by raising the level of Lake Sandal with the blind Sopokha dam, which blocks the outlet of the Sandalka River. The reservoir serves as the upper pool of the Kondopoga Hydroelectric Power Station; water discharge from the reservoir occurs into Lake Onega through the HPP turbines and spillway.

The Sopokha dam is earthen, filled with sand and loam, protected from filtration by a buttress drainage and drainage ditch. The dam's length is 1427 m, maximum height—5.2 m, crest width — 3.5 m, base width — 33 m. The crest elevation is 64 m, crest elevation above the normal backwater level — 1.45 m, head on the dam — 3.75 m. The upstream slope is secured with stone paving. Initially, the dam had a spillway into the Sopokha River, but it is now filled in. It was built in 1926 and reconstructed in 1938 with an increase in height.

Coordinates of the central part of the dam: 62°20′14″N 34°00′59.3″E.

The Sandal Reservoir incorporated Lake Sandal (whose level was raised by 1.5–2 m (4 ft 11 in – 6 ft 7 in), as well as Nigo Lake and Gabo Lake, which became bays of the reservoir. At normal backwater level, the Sandal Reservoir has an area of 185 km^{2} (71 sq mi), length of 41.7 km, maximum width of 7.3 km, maximum depth of 58 m. The total and useful capacity is 1780 and 298 mil. m3, respectively, allowing for seasonal regulation (the reservoir is filled during flood and drawn down during low-water period) and partial long-term regulation (filled in wet years and drawn down in dry years). The normal backwater level elevation is 62.55 m, dead storage level—60.9 m, forced backwater level—62.65 m (205.5 ft).

=== Derivation ===
The Kondopoga Hydroelectric Power Station's derivation is intended to convey water from the Sandal Reservoir to the station complex. It includes a derivation canal and headworks located within the urban development of the city of Kondopoga.

The derivation canal is open, non-pressurized, self-regulating, constructed in a half-cut–half-embankment, with a maximum discharge capacity of 200 m3/s. Length, per various sources, 1,750–1,970 m (5,740–6,460 ft), top width 34 m, bottom width 9.6 m, depth 7–8 m (23–26 ft). The canal dams have a maximum height of 7.99 m, crest elevation—63.09 m (207.0 ft) (elevation above NBL—0.6 m (2 ft 0 in). The canal slopes are secured with stone paving with gunite. The canal contains a water intake for the pulp and paper mill, crossed by several bridges and urban utility crossings.

The headworks are located at the beginning of the derivation canal and are intended to block the canal during its draining. It is a reinforced concrete surface dock-type water intake with one 11 m span opening, closed by a 5-section flat sliding metal gate, with a cable hoisting mechanism of 12 t capacity. The intake length is 32 m, width—23.4 m, height—11.1 m; the Saint Petersburg–Murmansk railway passes along the headworks abutments. Coordinates of the headworks: 62°12′24.8″N 34°17′08.1″E.

=== Station complex ===
External image
- Operation of the Kondopoga HPP spillway

The station complex includes a forebay with water intake, penstocks, spillway, powerhouse, tailrace canal, and open switchyard (OSY) 110 kV.

The forebay (intake chamber) is located at the end of the derivation canal and is intended to accumulate water supplied to the HPP units. The basin length is 20.6 m, width 23–37.2 m (75–122 ft), depth 7.72–10.85 m (25.3–35.6 ft), bottom lining—asphalt. In the end part of the basin is a deep reinforced concrete monolithic water intake with 6 penstock intake chambers, intake length 44 m, width 18.8 m, height 20.5 m. Maximum head on the intake — 10 m. The intake chambers are separated by 1.2 m thick piers, chamber spans have a width of 5.4 m. The chambers are equipped with maintenance gates, stationary inclined metal trash racks, and flat wheeled emergency-maintenance gates. Hoisting equipment — a bridge crane of 10 t capacity, as well as 3 winches (2×80 t, 1×35 t).

Water supply to the hydro units is via penstocks divided into first and second stages. The first stage penstocks (in operation since 1929) are reinforced concrete, 83.3 m long. One has an internal diameter of 3.2 m (10 ft) (wall thickness 0.3–0.5 m (1 ft 0 in – 1 ft 8 in)) and is in operation; the second has an internal diameter of 2 m (6 ft 7 in) (wall thickness 0.25–0.36 m (9.8 in – 1 ft 2.2 in)) and is not in operation (plugged with a concrete plug from the intake side). The second stage penstocks are metal (wooden until 1994), 92 m long, internal diameter 4.5 m, wall thickness 12 mm (0.47 in).

The spillway is surface, monolithic reinforced concrete, including water intake, plunge pool, ski jump, still ing basin, stilling sill, and slab with energy dissipators, tailrace canal. Maximum discharge capacity — 72 m3/s. The intake has a spillway opening 5×4.5 m, closed by a 3-section metal flat wheeled gate, as well as a maintenance gate. Hoisting mechanism—bridge crane of 15 t capacity. Spillway length (intake and plunge pool) — 30.55 m (100.2 ft).

The powerhouse is structurally divided into two buildings — the first and second stage buildings. The first stage powerhouse houses one horizontal hydro unit, equipped with a radial-axial turbine with twin runners of 1.4 m diameter, manufactured by the Swedish firm NOHAB. Both stages' turbines operate at a design head of 28 m. The turbine drives a G-227 hydro generator of 3.5 MW (4,700 hp) capacity, manufactured by the Swedish firm ASEA. The unit is installed using a bridge crane of 35 t capacity. The first stage building is seven stories, faced with granite, length (above-water part) 24 m, width 20 m, height 24.5 m, built in 1923–29; initially, it housed two hydro units. Water after the hydro unit is discharged into Lake Onega via a 140 m long tailrace canal, 26.5 m bottom width, with bottom and slopes secured by stone riprap.

The second stage powerhouse (consisting of the machine hall, installation platform, control room, and 6 kV switchgear) houses two vertical hydro units equipped with vertical radial-axial turbines with 2.82 m diameter runners, manufactured by the Finnish firm Tampella. The turbines drive GS-2808 generators of 12 MW (16,000 hp) capacity each, manufactured by ASEA. Since the turbine capacity is less than the generator capacity, the installed capacity of the second stage hydro units is 10.7 MW (14,300 hp) each. The units are installed using a bridge crane of 100 t capacity. The second stage building is four stories, faced with stone blocks, length (above-water part) 58 m, width 22.5 m, height 30 m, built in 1936–41. Water after the hydro units is discharged into Lake Onega via a 113 m long tailrace canal, 27 m bottom width, with bottom and slopes secured by concrete and stone riprap.

=== Power evacuation scheme ===
The station's generators deliver electricity at 6.3 kV, transformed to 110 kV by a TDG transformer of 31.5 VA capacity. Electricity is evacuated to the power system from the open switchyard via three 110 kV transmission lines:

- Kondopoga HPP—SS 20 "KOK" (L-121),
- Kondopoga HPP—Kondopoga PPM (L-123),
- Kondopoga HPP—SS 63 "Berezovka" (L-168).
Structures and equipment of the Kondopoga Hydroelectric Power Station

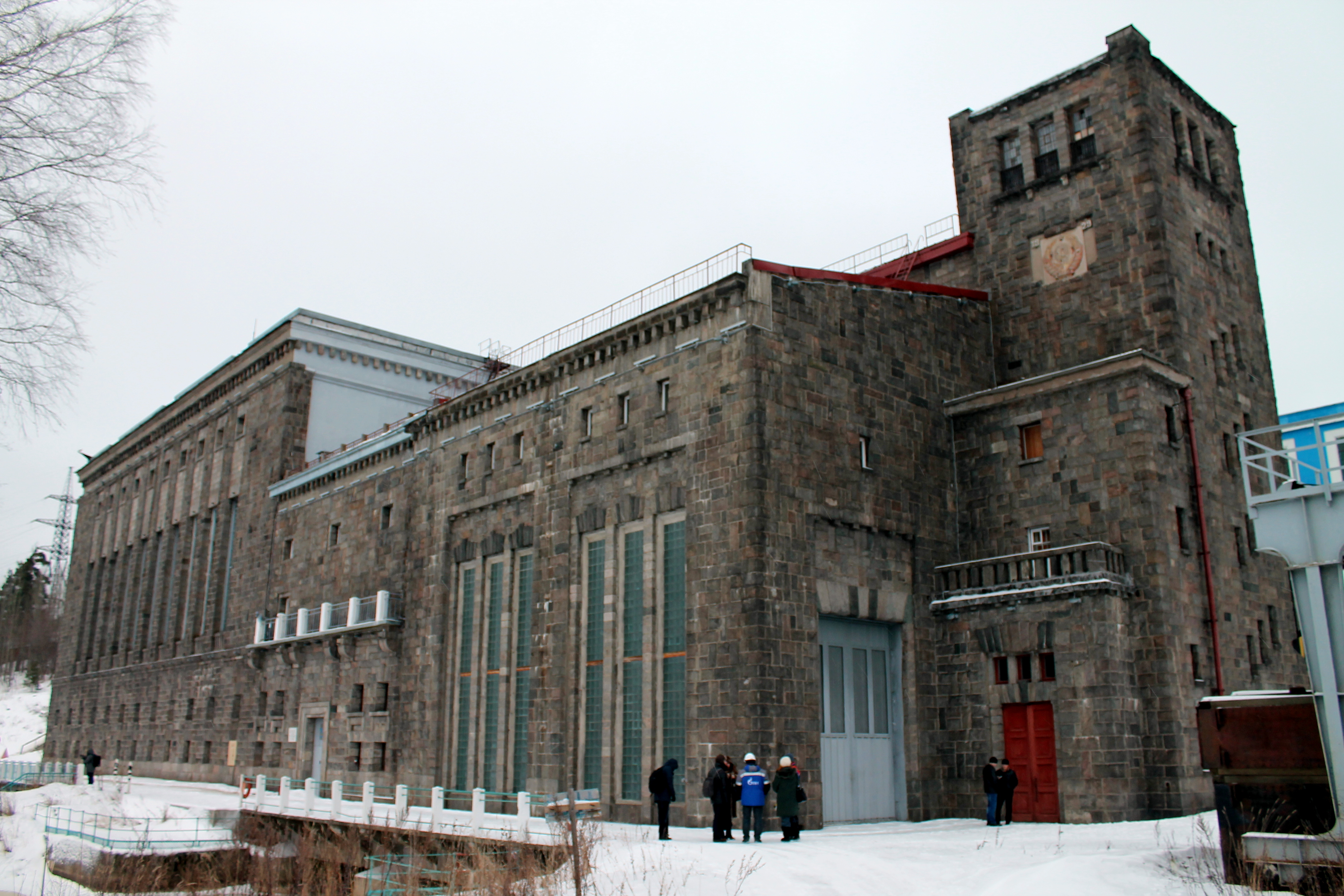
Powerhouse

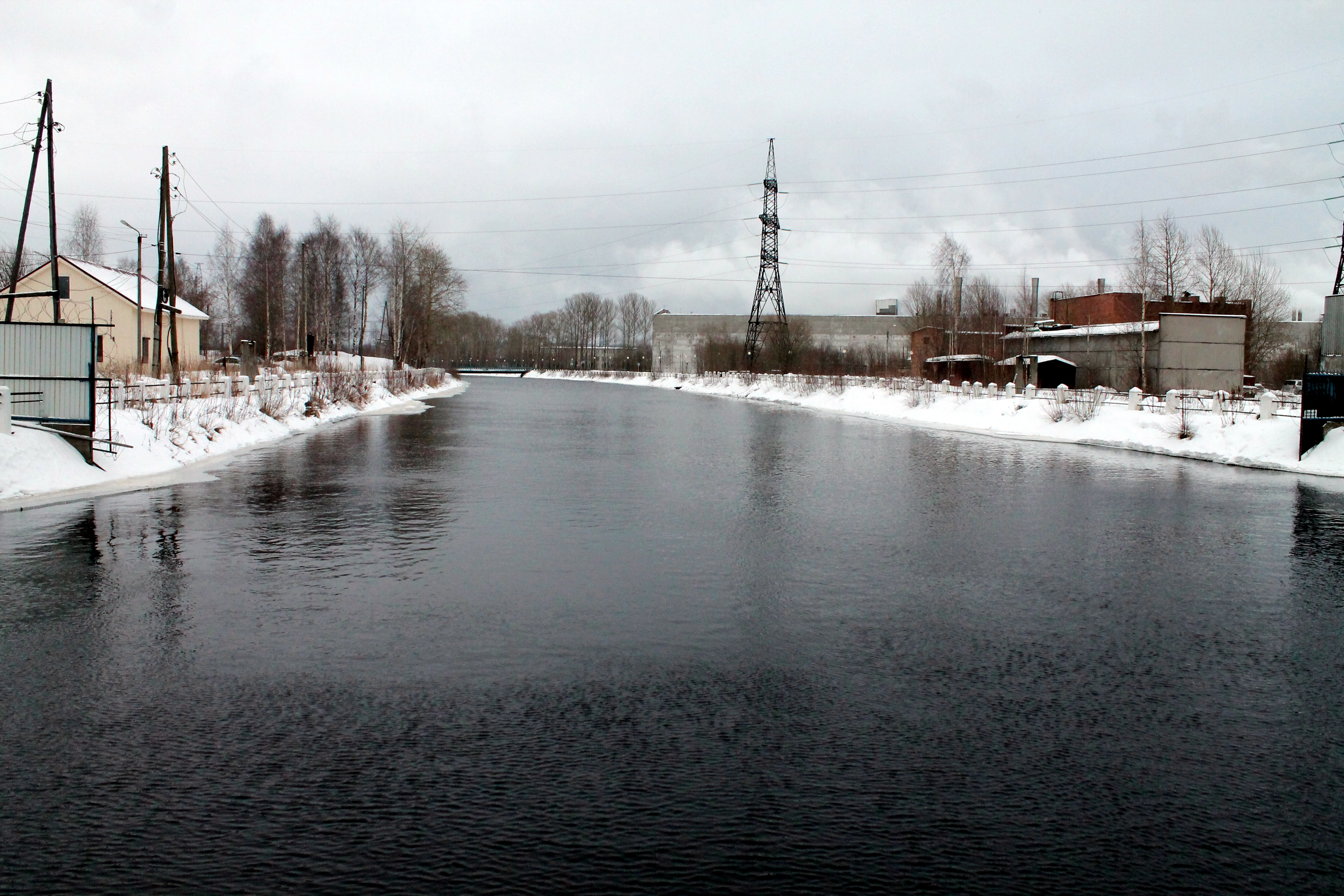
Derivation canal

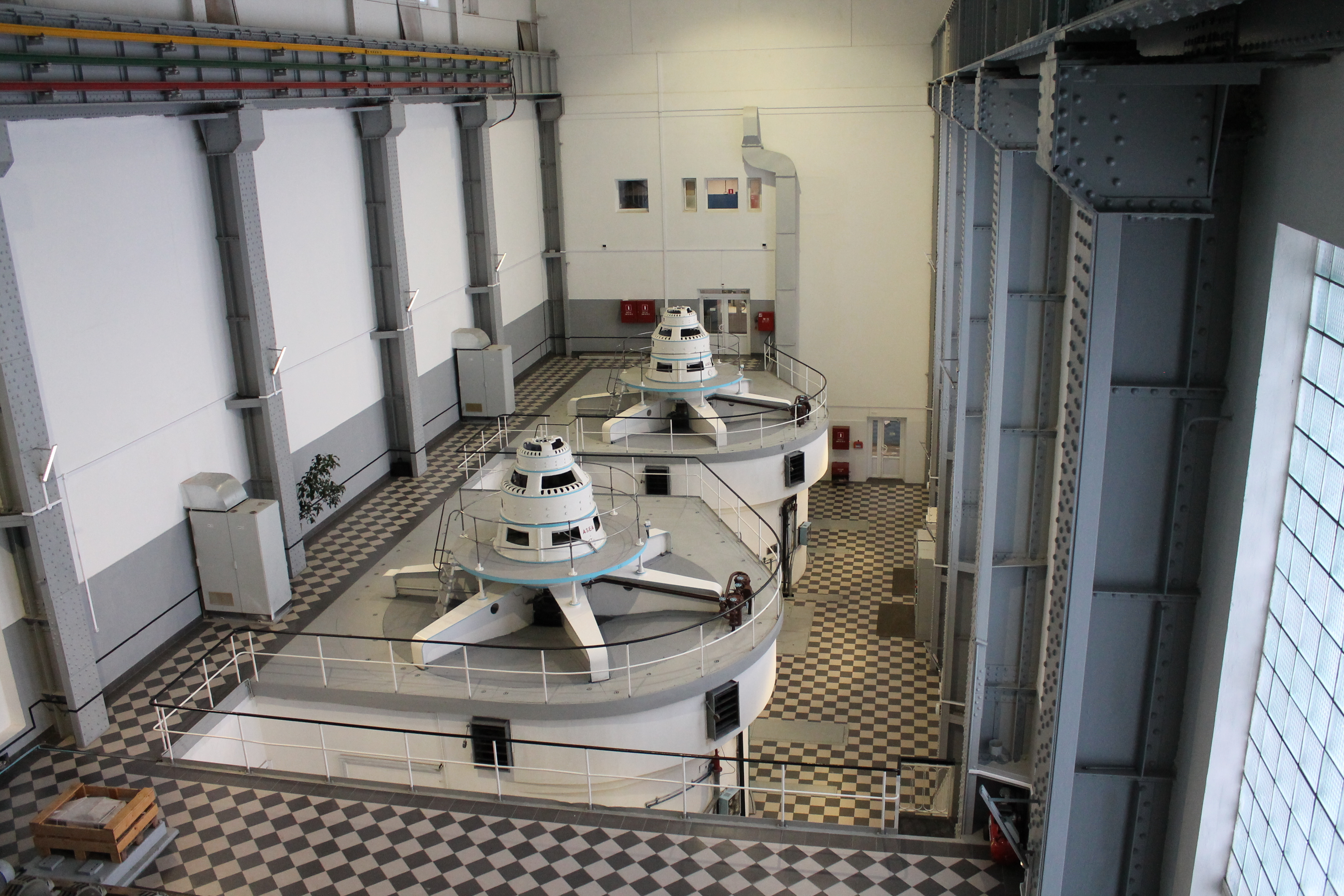
Machine hall of the second stage

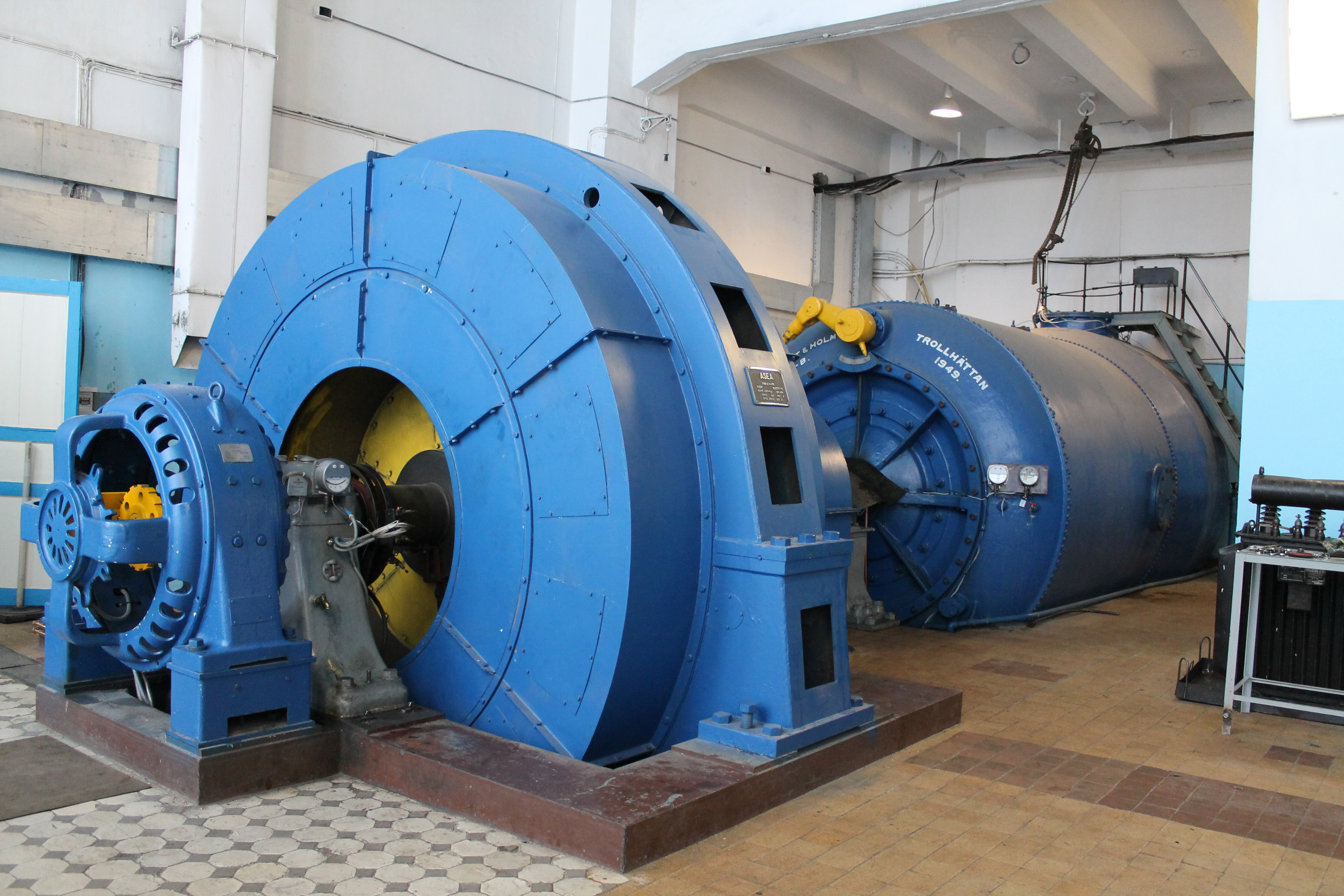
Hydro unit of the first stage

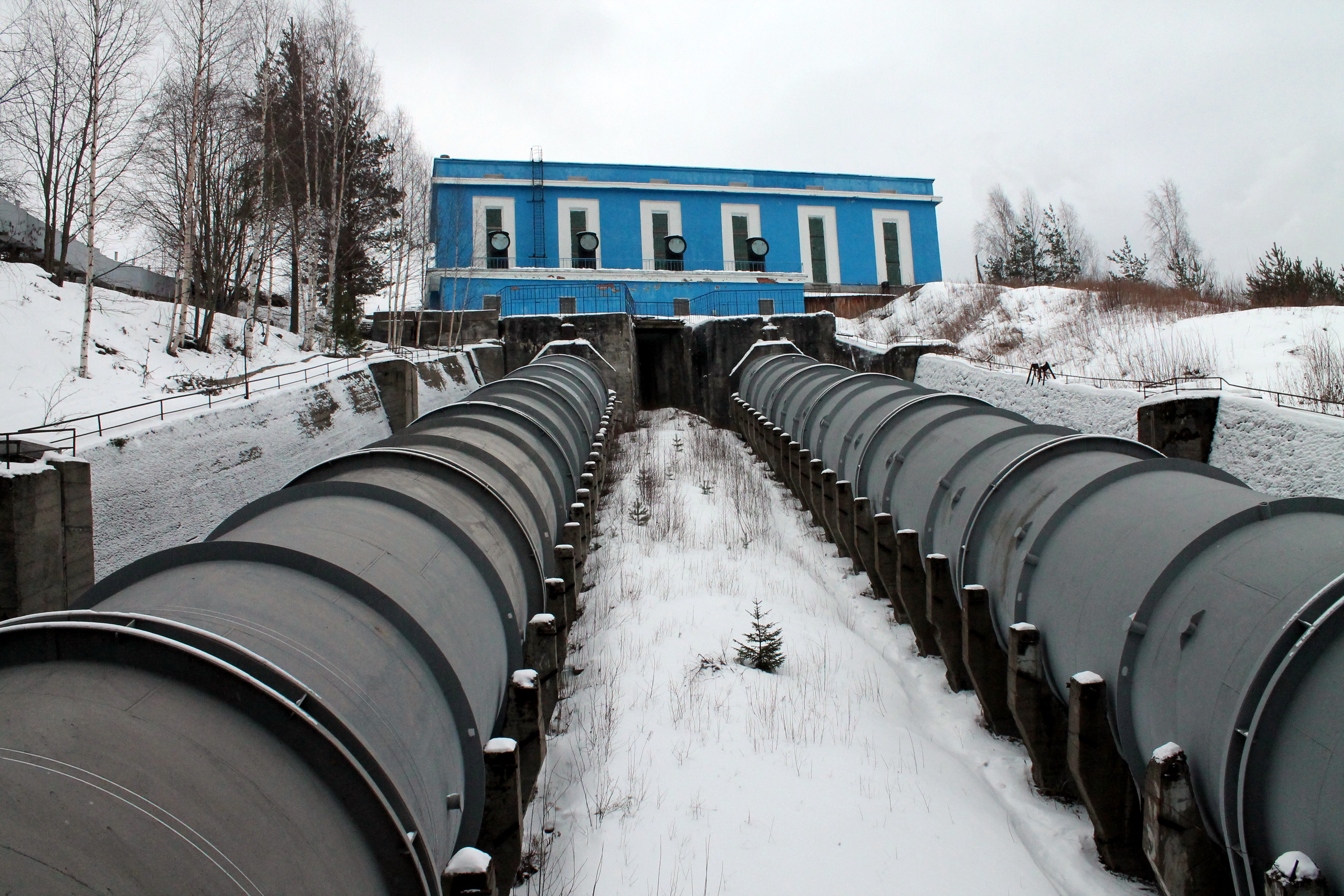
Water intake and penstocks

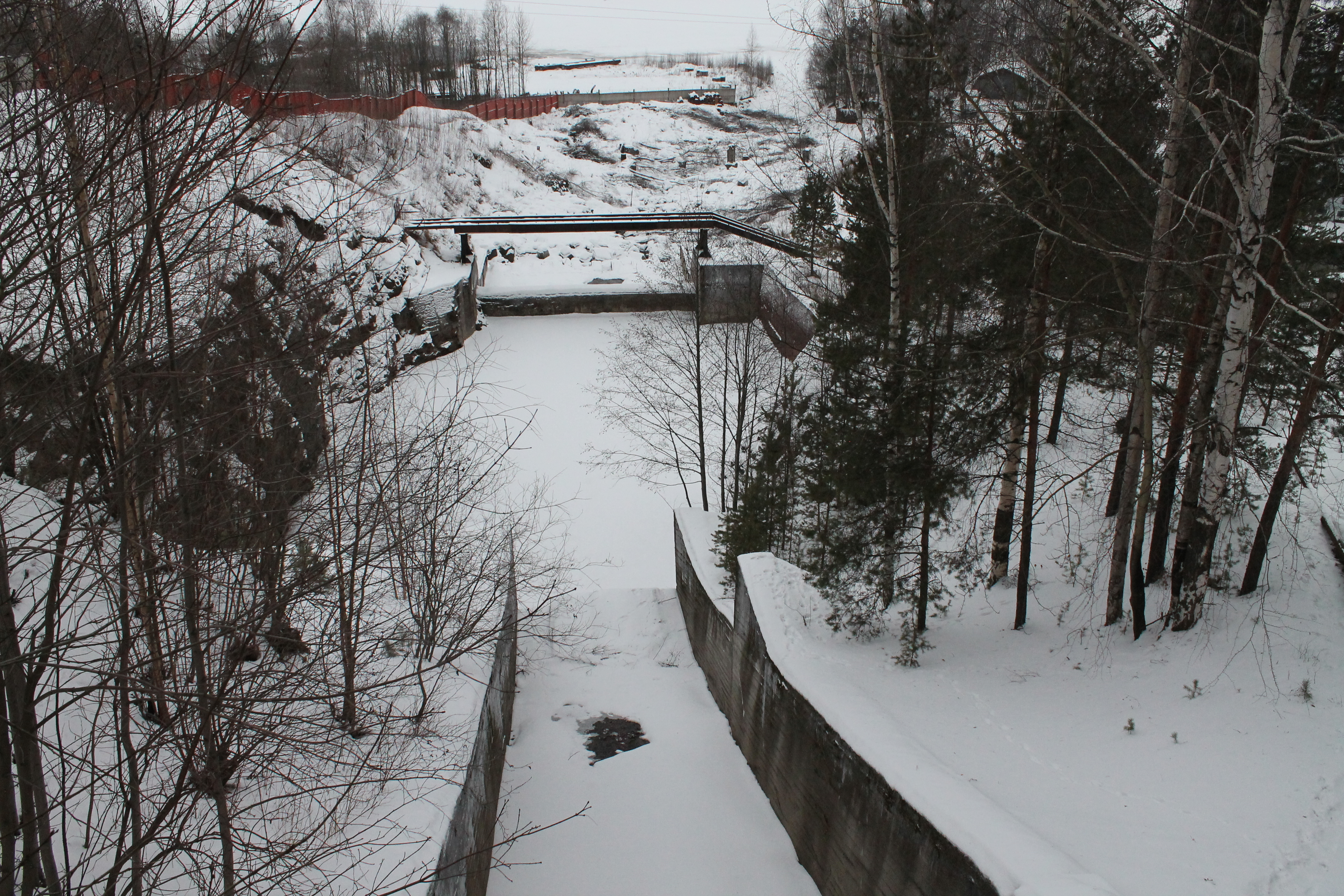
Spillway

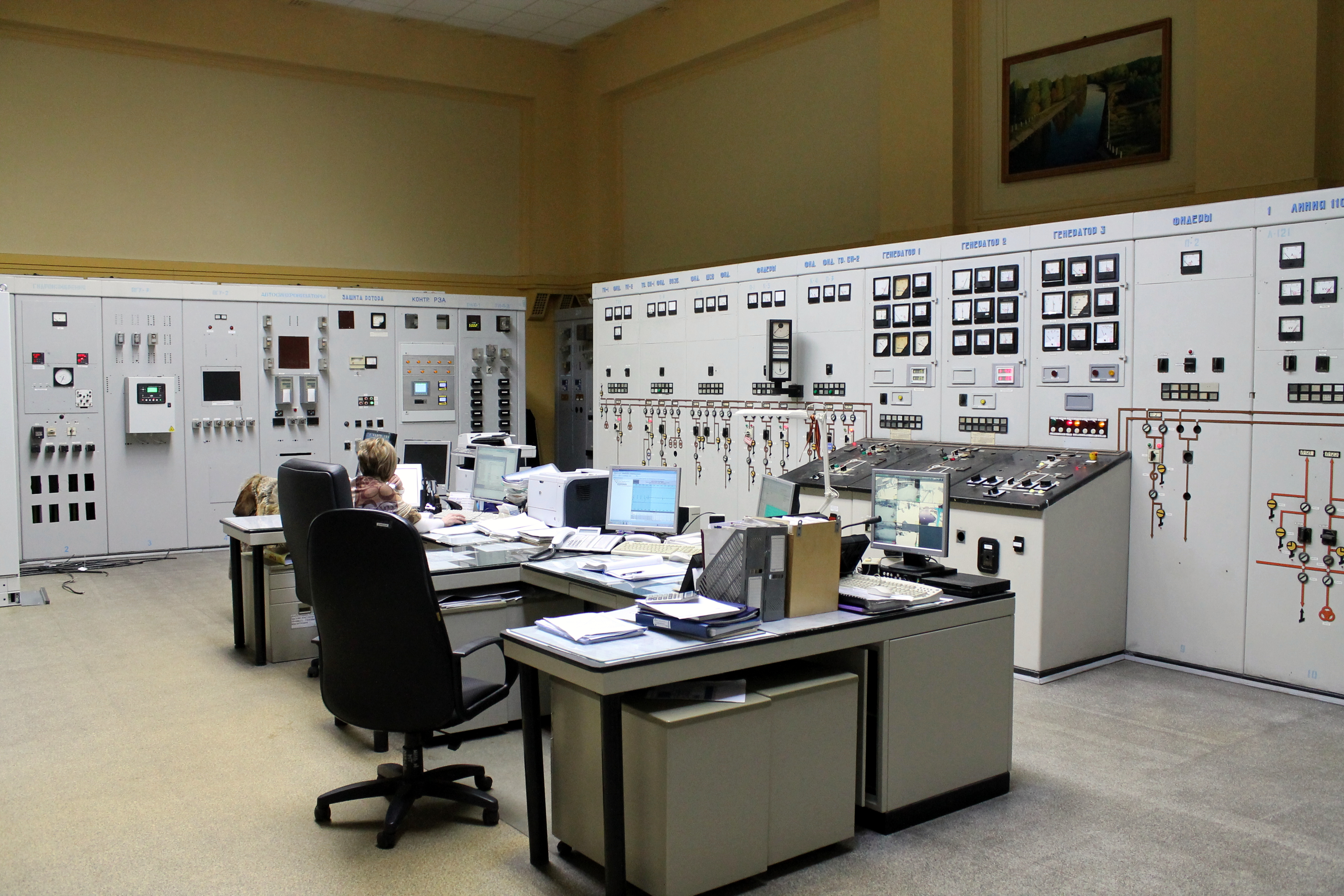
Control panel

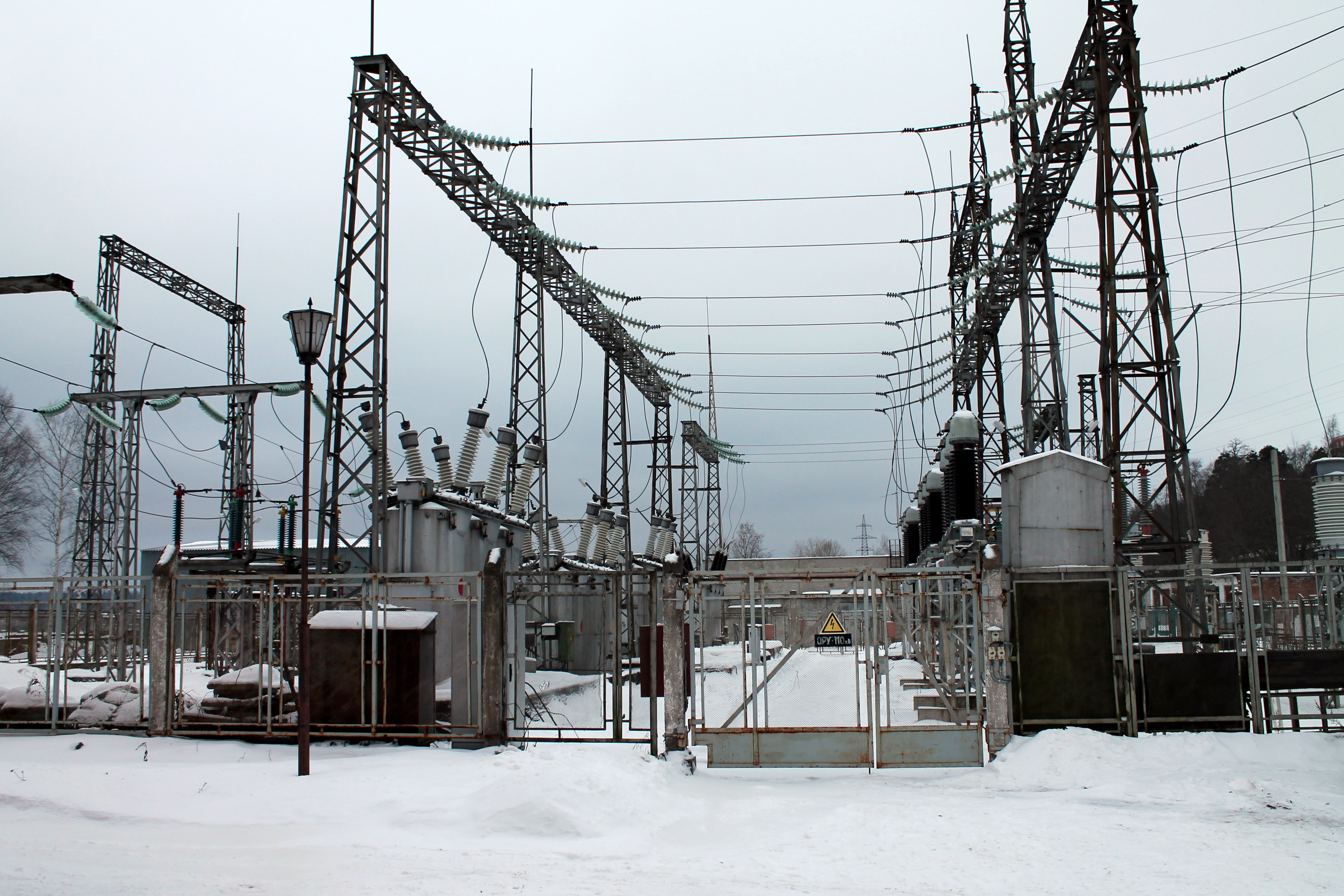
Switchyard (OSY-110 kV)

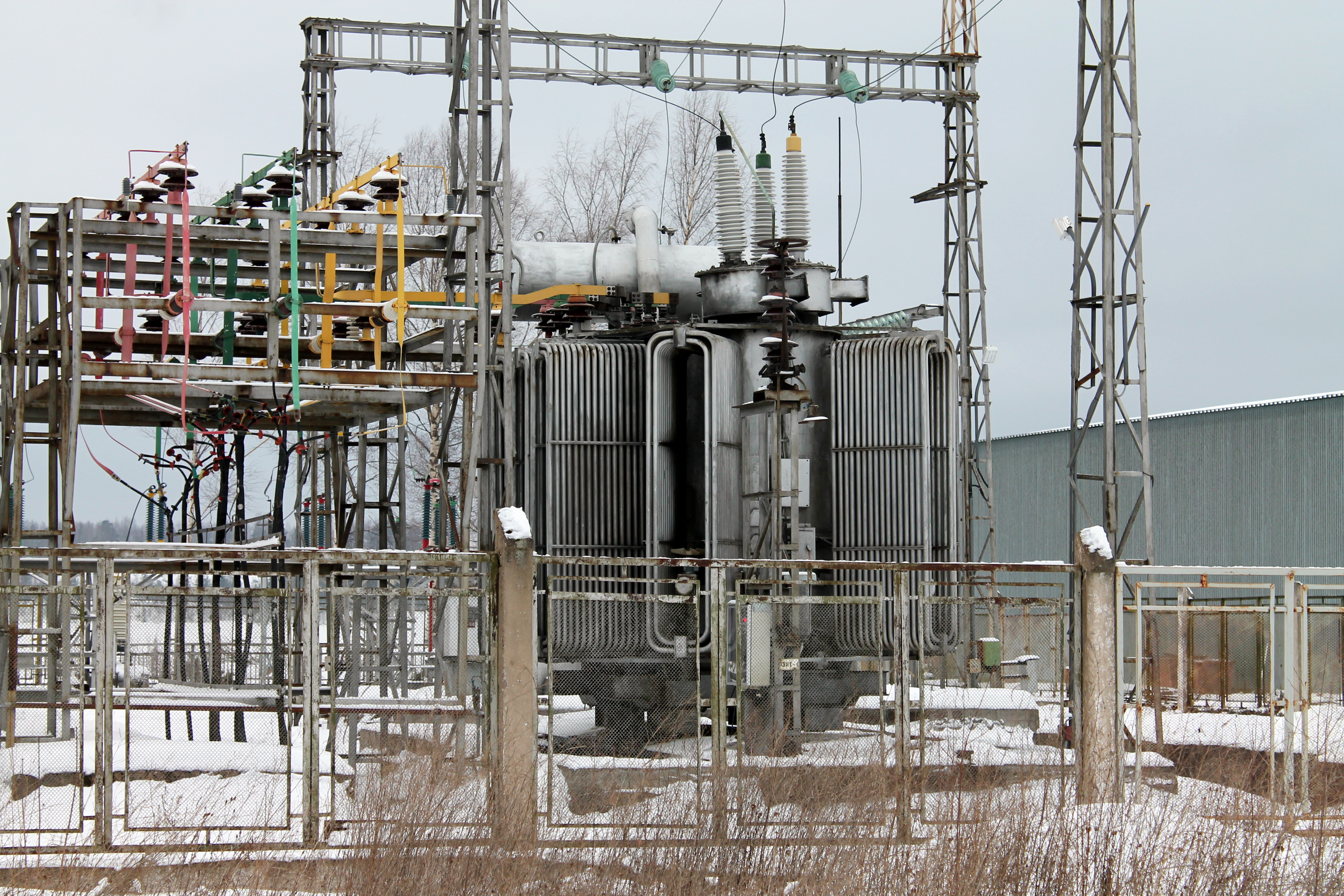
Power transformer

== Construction impacts ==
The construction of the Kondopoga Hydroelectric Power Station spurred industrial development in the region, providing electricity to a major pulp and paper mill. Contemporaries assessed the significance of the Kondopoga Hydroelectric Power Station as follows:

...putting the Kondopoga hydroelectric power station into operation, we must remember that thereby we are laying the foundation for a powerful industry, transforming the face of Petrozavodsk, creating an industrial city of Kondopoga.

Over its operation, the power station has generated about 8 kWh of renewable electricity. The cost of electricity production in the Suna Cascade HPPs as of 2001 was estimated at 11.2 kopecks per kWh.

In creating the Kondopoga Hydroelectric Power Station reservoirs, 2,200 ha (5,400 acres) of agricultural land were flooded. The diversion of most of the Suna runoff led to the drying up of the Girvas and Por-Porog waterfalls (whose water flow now occurs only during spillway releases through the Girvas dam), and also significantly reduced the aesthetic appeal of the Kivach waterfall.

== Construction and operation history ==
- Kondopoga HPP derivation canal, 1930
- Kondopoga HPP building, 1931
- Machine hall of the first stage of the Kondopoga HPP, 1932

Survey work to justify the possibility of constructing hydroelectric power stations in the Suna basin began in 1898 under the leadership of engineer Timofeev. The first project to utilize the elevation difference between Nigo Lake and Lake Onega was proposed in 1902 by engineer Tokarsky, and in 1909 another project for constructing an HPP in the area was developed by Professor Teikhman. In 1903, Tokarsky's partnership received a concession to build the hydroelectric power station but was unable to implement the project.

During the First World War, in the Kondopoga volost of the Olonets Governorate, the Main Artillery Directorate of the Imperial Russian Army's War Ministry began preparations for constructing a nitric acid plant necessary for gunpowder production. To power the plant, the construction of the Kondopoga Hydroelectric Power Station was planned; its project, approved in 1915, was developed by engineer G. O. Grafio. The HPP capacity was set at 20 MW (27,000 hp), with provision for diverting Suna runoff to Lake Sandal. Construction of the Kondopoga Hydroelectric Power Station began in 1916, but at the end of 1917, due to the October Revolution and the start of the Russian Civil War, construction was halted and evacuated in 1919. By that time, significant preparatory work had been completed — a settlement, brick factory, and railway had been built, and the dam at Sopokha had been erected. Construction involved prisoners of war (Turks, Czechs, Hungarians, and Croats), as well as local peasants as hired laborers.

The Kondopoga Hydroelectric Power Station project was revisited in 1921—on April 26, the SNK of the RSFSR adopted a resolution sanctioning the construction in Kondopoga of a pulp and paper mill and hydroelectric power station. Later, HPP construction was included in the GOELRO plan; the hydroelectric power station project was developed by the Lenhydroproject institute. Construction work was deployed in 1923 and was carried out mostly manually. The station was decided to be built in two stages; the first stage included the "Sopokha" dam and an HPP of 5.5 MW (7,400 hp) capacity, while the second stage planned the diversion tract for the Suna River and expansion of the HPP by installing two more hydro units with a total capacity of 22 MW (30,000 hp). Commissioning of the first stage of the Kondopoga Hydroelectric Power Station (two hydro units of 4 MW (5,400 hp) and 1.5 MW (2,000 hp) capacity) occurred on January 29, 1929. Thus, the Kondopoga Hydroelectric Power Station became one of the first hydroelectric power stations built in the USSR.

Construction of the second stage of the Kondopoga Hydroelectric Power Station began in 1932 with the erection of Suna runoff diversion facilities; a specialized organization Sunagesstroy was created for the work, and the technical project for the diversion was approved by the Central Electrical Council of the Main Directorate of the Energy Economy of the People's Commissariat for Heavy Industry (Glavenergo) in May 1933. The preparatory stage of construction was completed in 1934, when the main structures began to be erected. By 1938, the Navda, Vagan, and Koikary dams, as well as the Girvas dam on the Suna, had been built, and the height of the Sopokha dam increased. A diversion canal over 3 km long from the Girvas Reservoir to Palyeozero was created. The canal started on the left bank of the Suna, about 400 m from the Girvas dam, then ran along the Vagan-oya stream bed, a rock cut (where a temporary regulator was built), and the Lukkan-oya stream bed, which passed through sandy formations and was quickly eroded by the flow to a depth of up to 25 m, forming three waterfalls where bedrock outcropped. As a result of erosion, about 7 mil. m3 of sand was carried into Palyeozero. In 1937–1940, a 6.6 km long log drive flume was built between the Suna and Sundozero. In 1936–1941, the second stage powerhouse of the Kondopoga Hydroelectric Power Station was built; by spring 1941, two hydro units of 11 MW (15,000 hp) capacity each were installed, increasing the station's capacity to 27.5 MW (36,900 hp).

In total, during the construction of the Kondopoga Hydroelectric Power Station, 620 000 m3 of soft soil and 10. 900 m3 of rock were excavated, 104.500 m3 of soft soil was emplaced, as well as 2.900 m3 of stone riprap, drains, and filters. 15 thousand tons of concrete and reinforced concrete were placed, and about 350 tons of metal structures and mechanisms were installed. The estimated cost of constructing the Kondopoga Hydroelectric Power Station in 1961 prices was 5.07 million rubles.

After the start of the Great Patriotic War, the HPP equipment was partially dismantled and evacuated. Three of the four hydro units were successfully evacuated (later installed at the Chirchik Cascade HPPs in Uzbekistan); one 1.5 MW hydro unit could not be evacuated and was blown up by retreating Soviet troops. From November 1941 to June 1944, the station was in territory occupied by Finnish troops. During the war, the HPP structures suffered significant damage, particularly the Girvas dam and log drive flume (which had to be rebuilt to new designs). Restoration work began in 1944. In 1947, new second-stage hydro units were commissioned, and in 1951—the first-stage hydro unit (it was decided not to restore the second destroyed first-stage hydro unit). The State Commission's acceptance act for the Kondopoga Hydroelectric Power Station into permanent operation was signed on October 10, 1951. Simultaneously, in 1947–1954, the Paleozerskaya Hydroelectric Power Station was built on the Suna diversion tract, during which the diversion canal, Girvas dam, log drive flume were rebuilt, and the "Koikara" and "Vagan" dams reconstructed. All these structures, originally built under the Kondopoga Hydroelectric Power Station project, now form part of the Paleozerskaya Hydroelectric Power Station.

External images
- Restoration of penstocks for hydro units No. 1 and 2, 1945
- Installation of penstocks for hydro units No. 1 and 2, 1947
- Installation of hydro units No. 1 and 2, 1946–47
- Installation of turbine and generator of the 3rd unit, 1951
- Machine hall of the second stage, 1952

Kondopoga HPP during the 1941–1944 occupation period

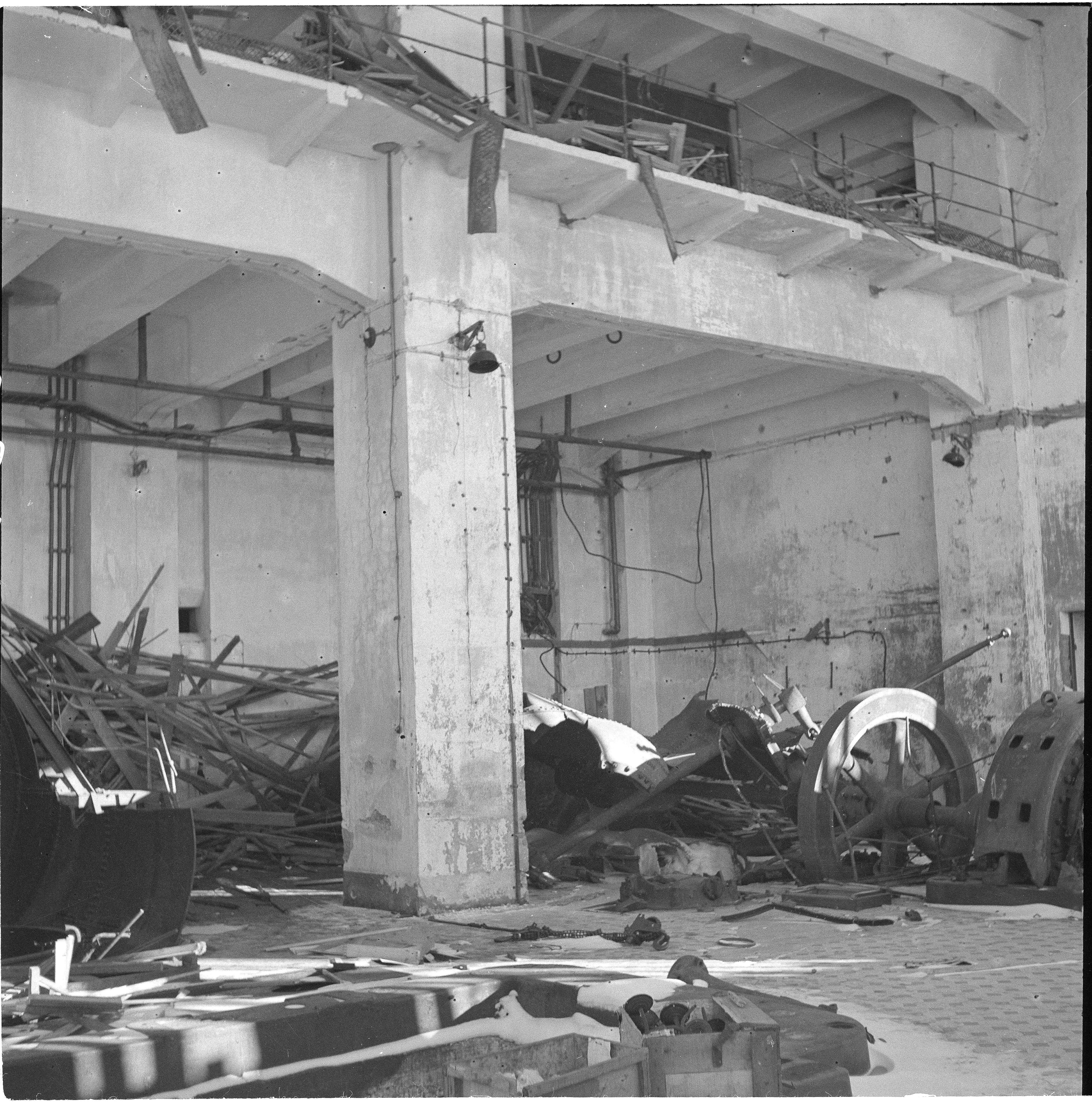
Machine hall of the first stage

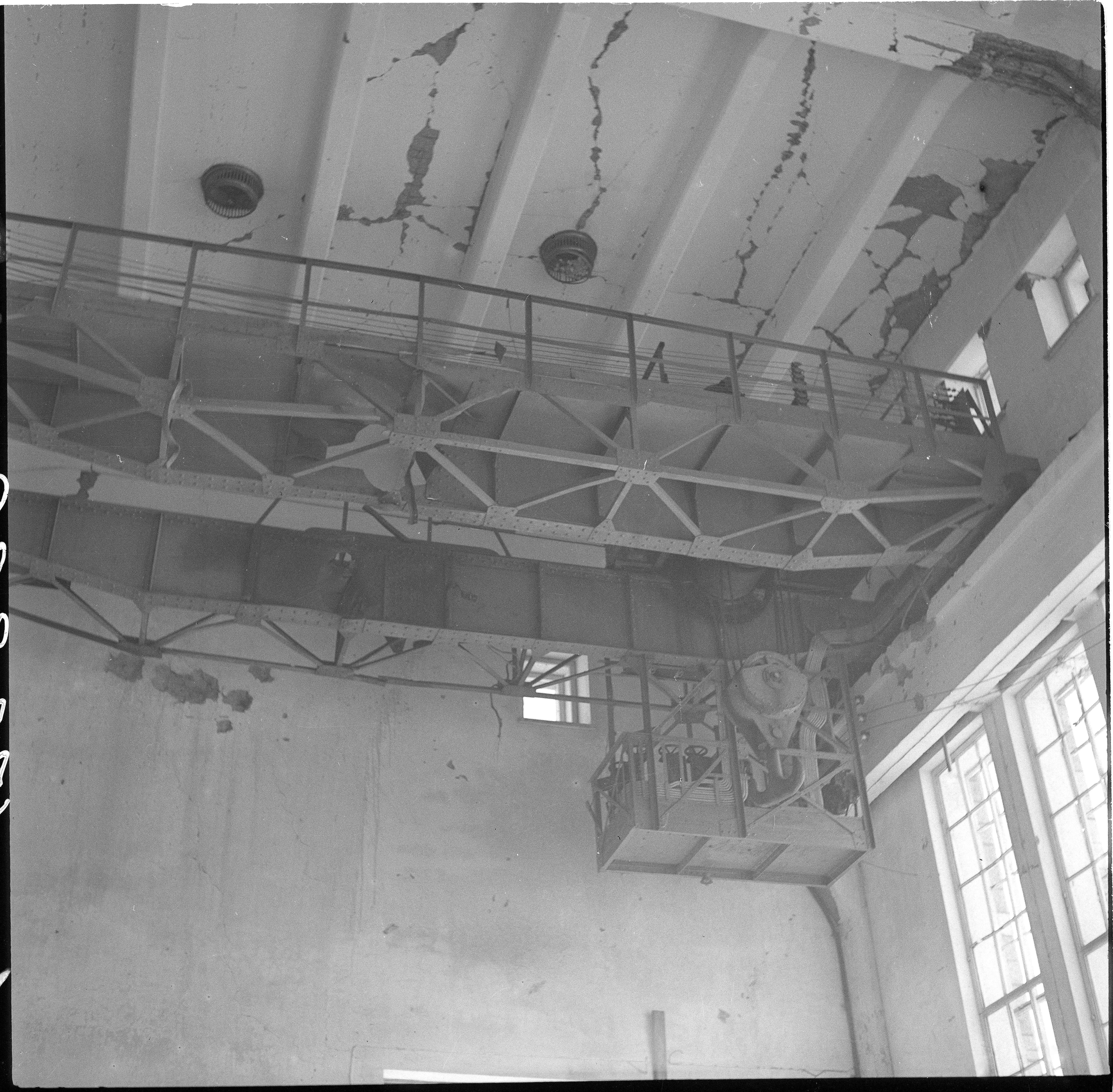
Crane in the machine hall

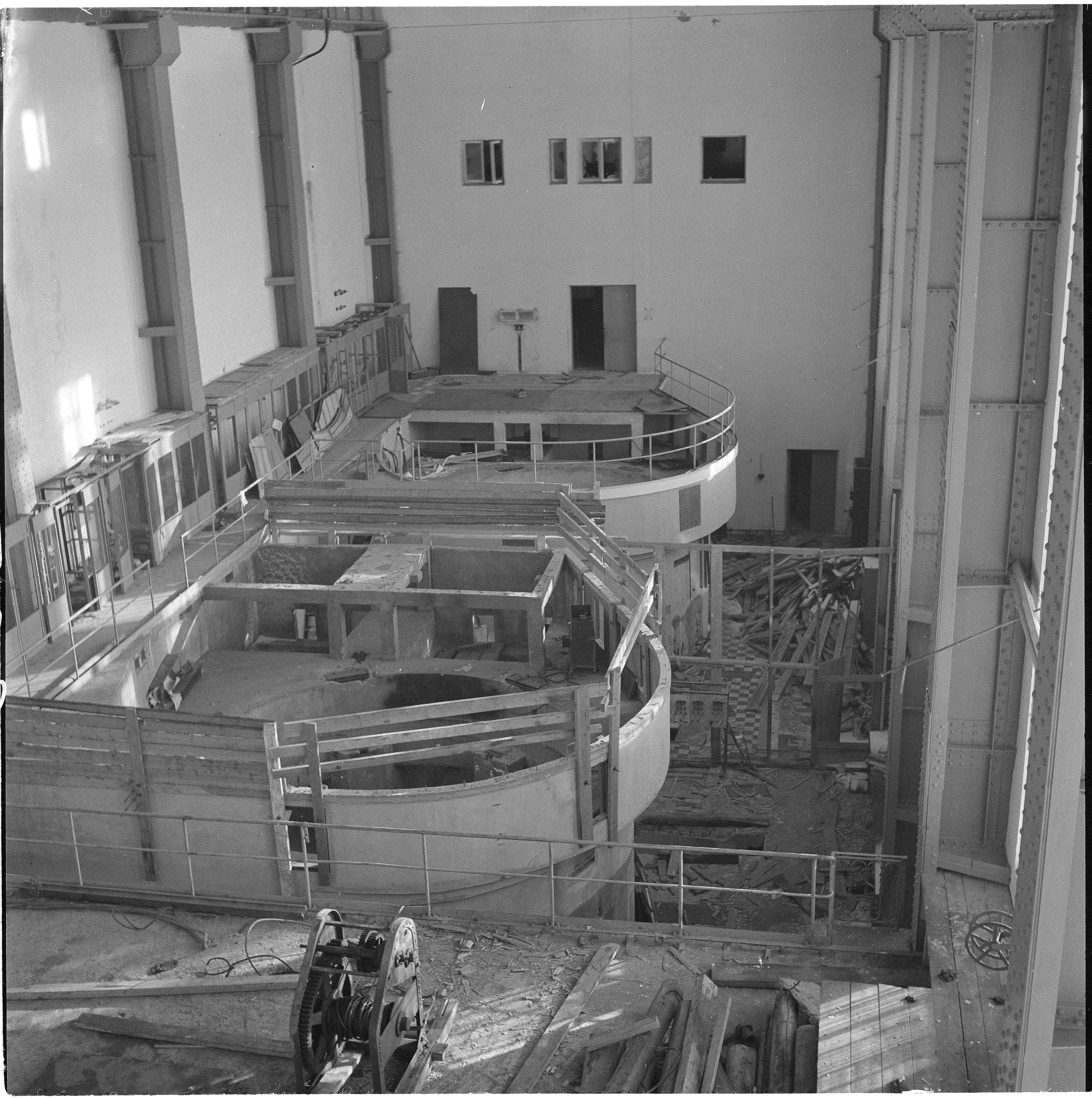
Machine hall of the second stage

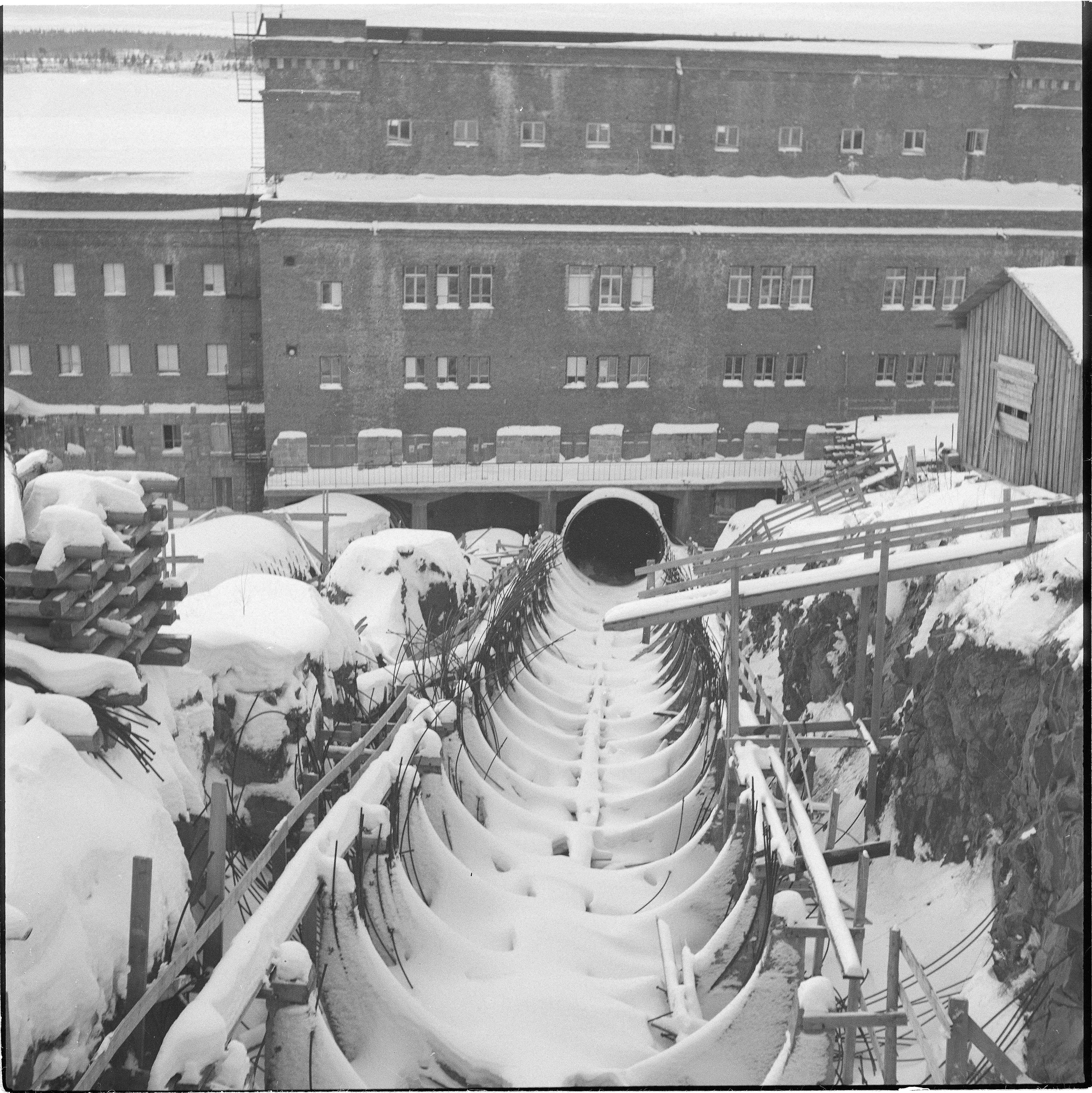
Penstocks (wooden)

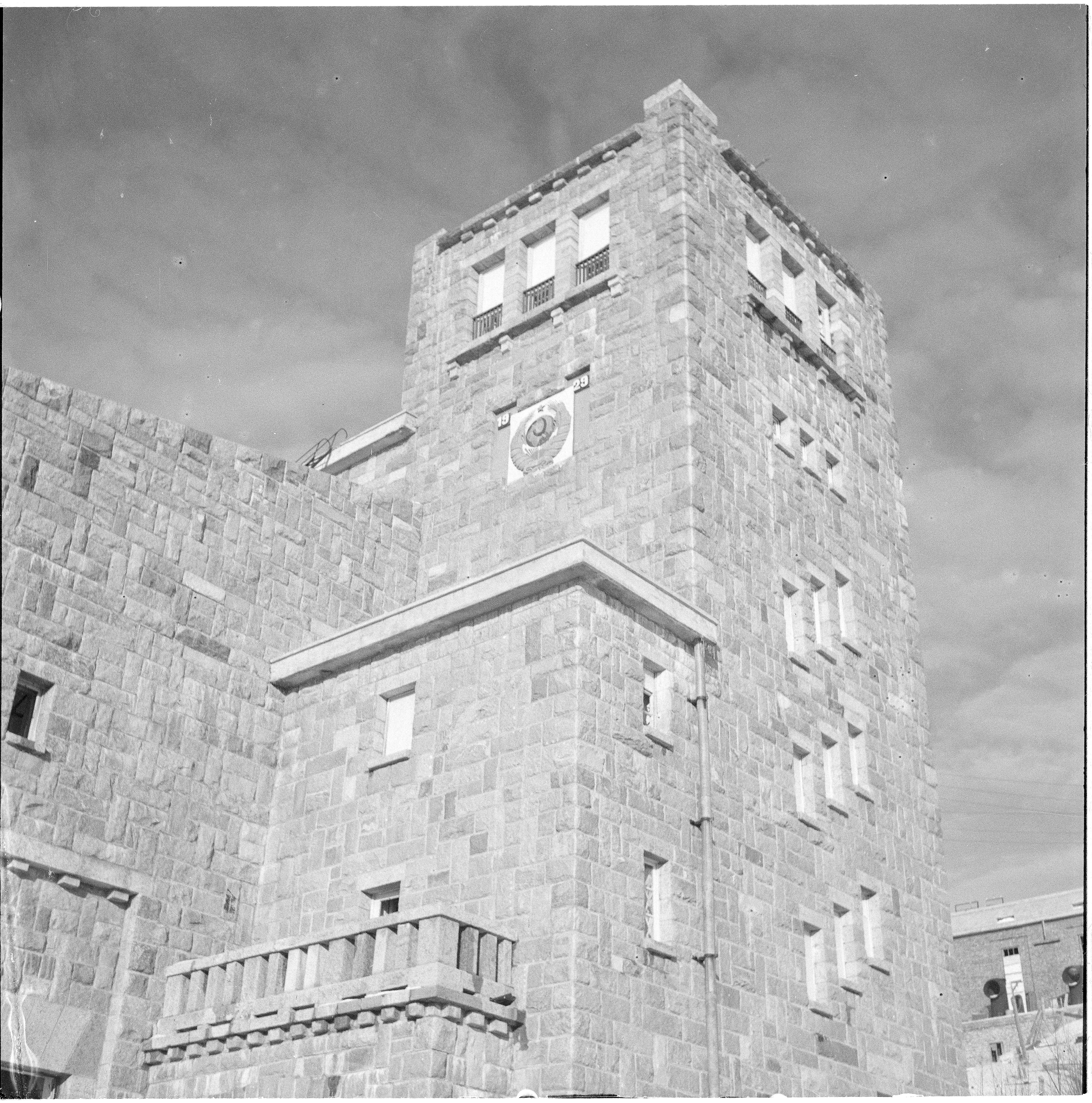
Powerhouse tower

In 1959, the Kondopoga Hydroelectric Power Station, previously operating in isolation, was connected to the national unified power system. In 1988, the Karelian District Energy Management was reorganized into the Karelian Production Association for Energy and Electrification; in 1993, it was transformed into OJSC Karelenenergo. In 2004, as part of the RAO "UES of Russia" reform, Karelia's power stations, including the Kondopoga Hydroelectric Power Station, were spun off from "Karelenenergo" into OJSC "Karelennergogeneration", and in 2005 transferred to PJSC TGC-1.

Since the 1990s to the present, the Kondopoga Hydroelectric Power Station's equipment and structures have been modernized; in particular, from 2018 to 2021, four MCP-110M switchgear switches at the open switchyard were replaced with SF6 VEB-110 switches. Since 2021, the station's capacity has decreased from 25.6 MW to 24.9 MW as a result of reducing the horizontal hydro unit's capacity from 4.2 MW to 3.5 MW.

== Bibliography ==
- Правила использования каскада водохранилищ на р. Суна (Гирвасское, Пальеозерское, Сандальское) [Rules for the use of the cascade of reservoirs on the Suna River (Girvas, Paleozero, Sandal)]. M.: Росводресурсы. 2014. p. 180. Archived from the original on 2014-05-03.
- Гидроэлектростанции России [Hydroelectric power stations of Russia]. M.: Типография Института Гидропроект. 1998. p. 467.
