= 2006 ethnic tensions in Kondopoga =

On the night of August 29–30, two ethnic Russians were killed and several others badly injured by Chechens in a restaurant in the town of Kondopoga in the Republic of Karelia, Russia.

A group of Russian men were eating at the Azeri-owned restaurant, when allegedly, they noticed that the expensive, premium brand vodka bottle the waiter was pouring their drinks from was actually filled with a cheap, low quality spirit. An argument and brief scuffle ensued. The ethnic Russians then left the bar. The barman then called a 'rescue team' of 15 Chechens. This team of hired 'protectors' actually arrived an hour after the Russians involved in the initial fracas had exited, but on arrival, randomly attacked ethnic Russian diners in the restaurant, who hadn't been involved in the original vodka dispute. Armed with baseball bats and knives, they set on the clientele shouting 'allahu akbar!', and in a brutal melee, 2 Russians were killed, 8 seriously injured and 15 mutilated, the injuries ranging from cuts to gouged out eyes. Despite the fact that 3 police vehicles were in the direct vicinity of the restaurant, the police did not intervene. This has led to allegations that the police were being paid off by the Chechen gang.

The Finnish television documentarist Arvo Tuominen explained the violence in the following way:

A couple of Russian fellows who had just been released from jail came to celebrate there (in the Chayka restaurant). They got fed up with the slow service of the Azeri bartender and did him in. The bartender called to the scene the Chechens from whom he had bought security. They then beat to death two bystanders. The police did not intervene in the events at all, since the Chechens had bought security from the police. Thus a spontaneous uprising of the people was the result.

After the funeral of the Russian victims, tensions spilled over into an all out riot as the mob attempted to obtain vigilante revenge. Many of the Chechens and the families left the town, some stating a desire to live in Finland.

Sergey Katanandov, the head of Karelia Republic, told "Izvestia" on September 6 about a gang of Chechens who drove around the town in a Mercedes without number plates 'terrorising locals'. He also related an incident where a Chechen gang beat a local policeman. An ensuing lawsuit by the policeman was dropped, Katanandov hinting that he had been 'paid off' by the gang - others believe fear of reprisals may have been his motivation. It said to be an open secret in Russia that many businesses often operate under the protection of kryshas ("roofs") - that provide protection via the FSB and other state bodies. In Kondopoga, many believe such 'immunity from prosecution' was visibly flaunted by the Chechen gang and the businesses under their protection.

Some reports link this state of affairs to clashes on the night of September 1–2, 2006 between groups of ethnic Russian youths and the OMON (a SWAT-type and riot-control unit) troops. The Chayka restaurant was destroyed during this unrest. A number of Chechen-owned businesses were also targeted.

On September 2, two days after the beginning of rioting, there was a mass meeting held at the town hall. A number of Russian nationalists came from Moscow, including leaders of Movement Against Illegal Immigration, and organized a rally calling on the government to forcibly resettle all people from the Caucasus, especially ethnic Chechens, from the town.

The nationalists pointed to the reign of fear spread by Chechen gangsters and the many violent acts committed against ethnic Russians, exacerbated by corrupt officials 'in the pockets' of the Chechens, as their motivation.

On April 1, 2010, the Chechens and Dagestanis who participated in the original restaurant attack were convicted of various crimes. Islam Magomadov was convicted of two counts of murder and sentenced to 22 years of imprisonment, five more people were convicted of assault and aggravated assault and received sentences ranging from 3 years 10 month up to 10 years of imprisonment.
