= OAO Kondopoga =

Russian pulp and paper production company

Kondopoga
- Company type: Open joint-stock company
- Founded: 1923
- Headquarters: Kondopoga, Russia
- Revenue: $14 million (2017)
- Operating income: −$1.39 million (2017)
- Net income: −$22.8 million (2017)
- Total assets: $233 million (2017)
- Total equity: −$27.9 million (2017)
- Website: aokcbk.ru

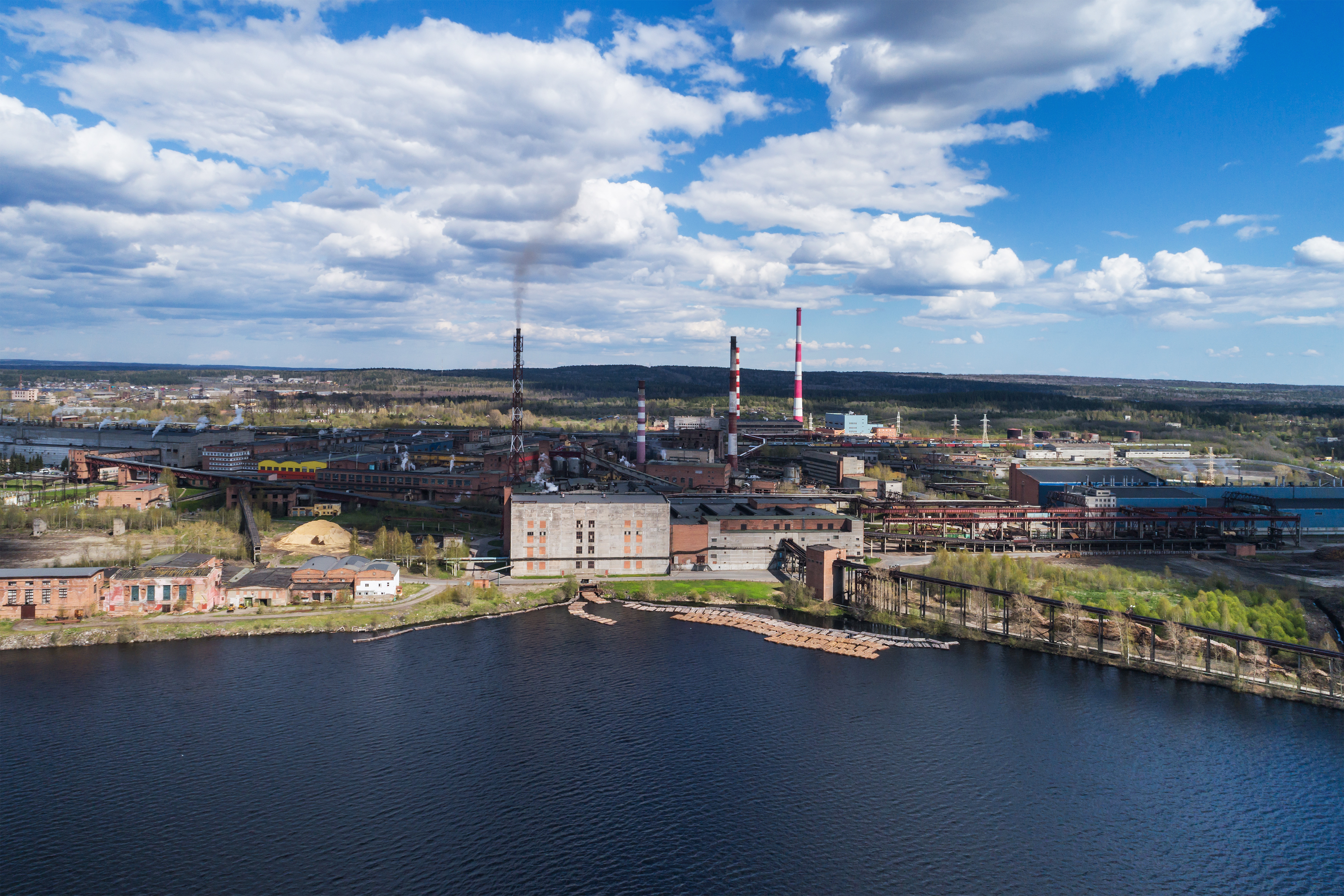
Aerial photo of the OAO Kondopoga pulp and paper mill

Joint Stock Company Kondopoga (Russian: ОАО «Кондопога») is a Russian pulp and paper production company located in the Republic of Karelia. It is currently the largest in Russia and 7th biggest in Europe newsprint producer with an annual output of 710 tpy. Headquartered in the city of Kondopoga, the company has 7,657 employees. It has two wholly owned subsidiaries and five affiliated companies. The company's stock is traded at the Russian Trading System.

Kondopoga's main product is newsprint, which constitutes 94.8% of the company's overall production. The company exports its newsprint to publishing and printing houses, including many in foreign countries such as the United Kingdom, Germany, Turkey, Sweden, Finland, India, Sri Lanka, Egypt and Latin America. Other products include paper for typewriters, ceramic brick, technical lignosulphonates, fodder yeast and others.

The company was founded in 1929. Every third Russian newspaper is printed on the paper made at "Kondopoga". According to Kommersant, OAO Kondopoga is one of the industry's most successful companies.

== History ==
The Mill's construction began in 1922 according to special resolution of the Council of People's Commissars of RSFSR. German-made "Fullner" PM 1 with 29,500 tpy newsprint capacity came on line 27 June 1929. Machine's initial speed was 175–200 m/min. The machine was supplied with stone groundwood produced on 3 grinders in groundwood room. Mill's start-up was supported by Kondopoga hydro power station and heat and power station. These stations were part of a paper mill and provided heat and electric power for the paper machine and three grinders. Two more paper machines, PM 3 and PM 2, had been made in Leningrad and commissioned by 1941. Total annual output amounted to 76,600 tons of paper.

1935 saw the commissioning of sulfite pulp mill consisting of 3 refractory-brick-lined 130 m3 digesters and pulp drying machine. 1940 the Pulp and Paper Mill turned into a fullcycle mill. 1941, when the Great Patriotic War broke out, most of the mill's equipment was evacuated to the east of the country. The town of Kondopoga and the mill's production buildings were destroyed during the war. Restoration of the Mill began 24 June 1944, immediately after liberation of Kondopoga. First post-war newsprint was produced on PM 1 in 1947. PM 2 was re-installed in 1948. Paper production restoration was completed after PM 3 had been recommissioned in 1950. The Mill fully restored its pre-war capacity in 1951. 1951 saw commissioning of the heat and power plant with 35 ATU steam boilers and two turbo generators with 7 MWT total capacity.

The most prominent development stage of Kondopoga Pulp & Paper Mill took place according to two CC CPSU and USSR Council of Ministers’ resolutions (1960 and 1976). Four paper machines with total capacity of 305,600 tpy of newsprint were commissioned 1960 through 1965 including: 1960 — PM 6 with 37,000 tpy of newsprint; 1961 — PM5 with 52,000 tpy of newsprint; 1963 — PM 4 with 108,000 tpy of newsprint. It became USSR's first wide high speed machine. PM 4 was equipped with the latest state-of-the-art machinery at that time. October 1965 — PM7 with 108.000 tpy came on stream. The machine had been the industry's leader in newsprint production for many years. A new groundwood mill was built in those years featuring 202B Europe grinders and related cleaner equipment. New acid, cleaner and wood preparation departments were built at the chemical pulp mill, the digester room was expanded by adding 3 bimetallic digesters, 160 m3 each.
