= Suna (river) =

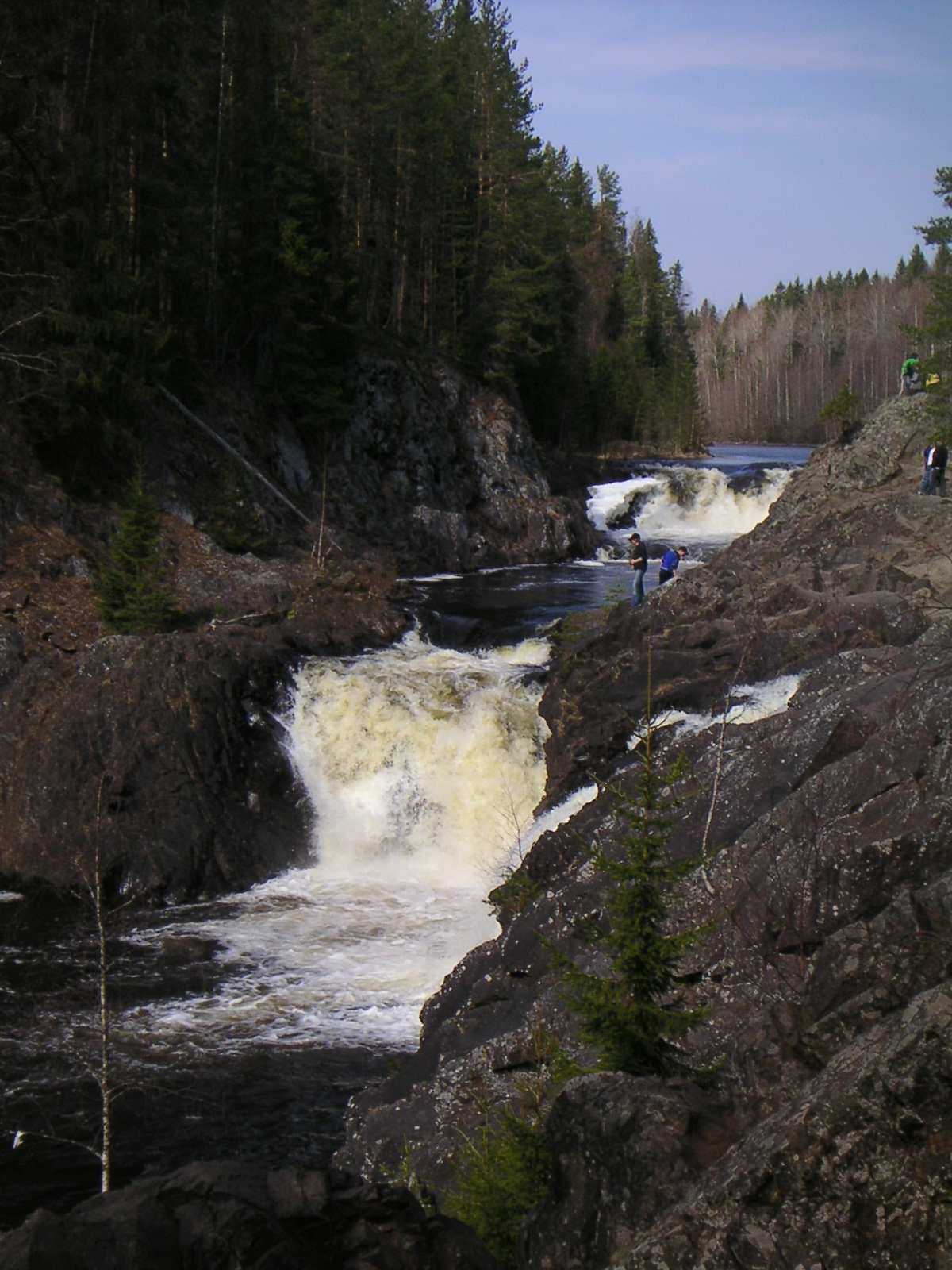
- Kivach Waterfall on Suna.

Location
- Country: Russia

Physical characteristics
- Source: Lake Kivijärvi
- Mouth: Lake Onega
  - coordinates: 62°06′28″N 34°16′26″E
- Length: 280 km (170 mi)
- Basin size: 7,670 km^{2} (2,960 sq mi)

Basin features
- Progression: Lake Onega→ Svir→ Lake Ladoga→ Neva→ Gulf of Finland

The Suna (Russian: Суна, Finnish: Suunujoki) is a river in the Republic of Karelia, Russia. The length of the river is 280 km. The area of its basin is 7,670 km^{2}. The Suna originates in Lake Kivijärvi and flows out into the Kondopoga Bay of Lake Onega.
