= Kondopoga Bay =

Bay in the Onega Lake, Russia

Coordinates: 62.0217°N 34.5903°E

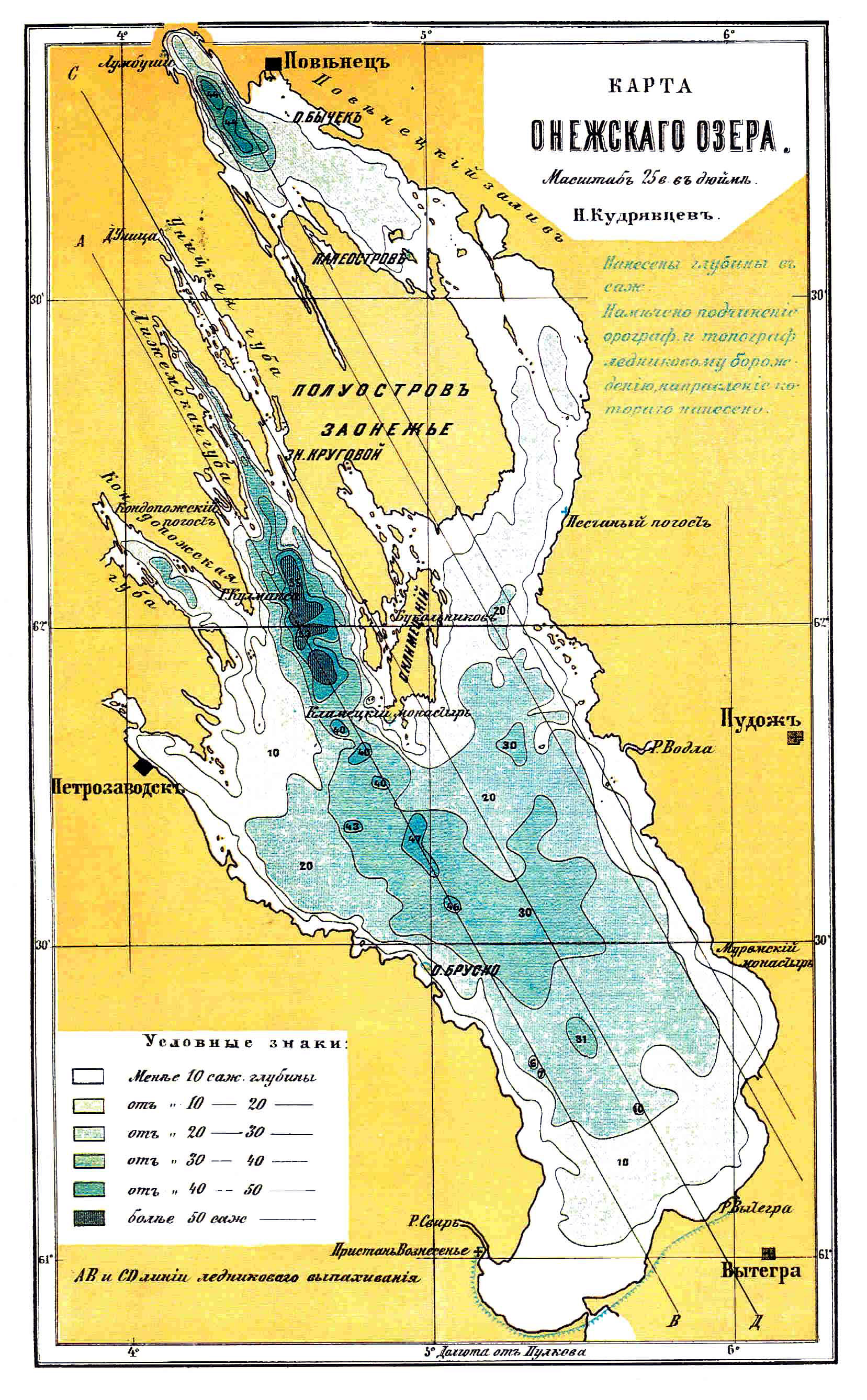
A depth map of the Onego Lake

The Kondopoga Bay (Russian: Кондопожская губа, Kondopozhskaya Bay) is a bay (length 32 km, width over 8 km, max depth 78m) in the northwestern part of the Karelian part of the Onega Lake, Russia .

View on Lake Onega from space, May 2002
The numbers denote: 1. Svirsk Bay; 2. Petrozavodsk Bay and the city Petrozavodsk; 3. Big Onego Bay; 4. Kondopozhskaya Bay; 5. Small Onego Bay; 6. Zaonezhsky Bay; 7. Povenetsky Bay; 8. Kizhi Island; 9. Lake Vodlozero and Vodlozero National Park; 10. Ivinsky Spill and River Svir; 11. Cape Besov Nos ("Devil's nose"); 12. Big Klimenetsky Island

The Kondopoga Bay is deeply carved in the land by glacial process. The upper part of the bay receives about 90% of the waters of the Suna River via the Nigozersky (Kondopozhsky) Canal. The bay also receives waste water, most of which comes from the Kondopoga paper mill.

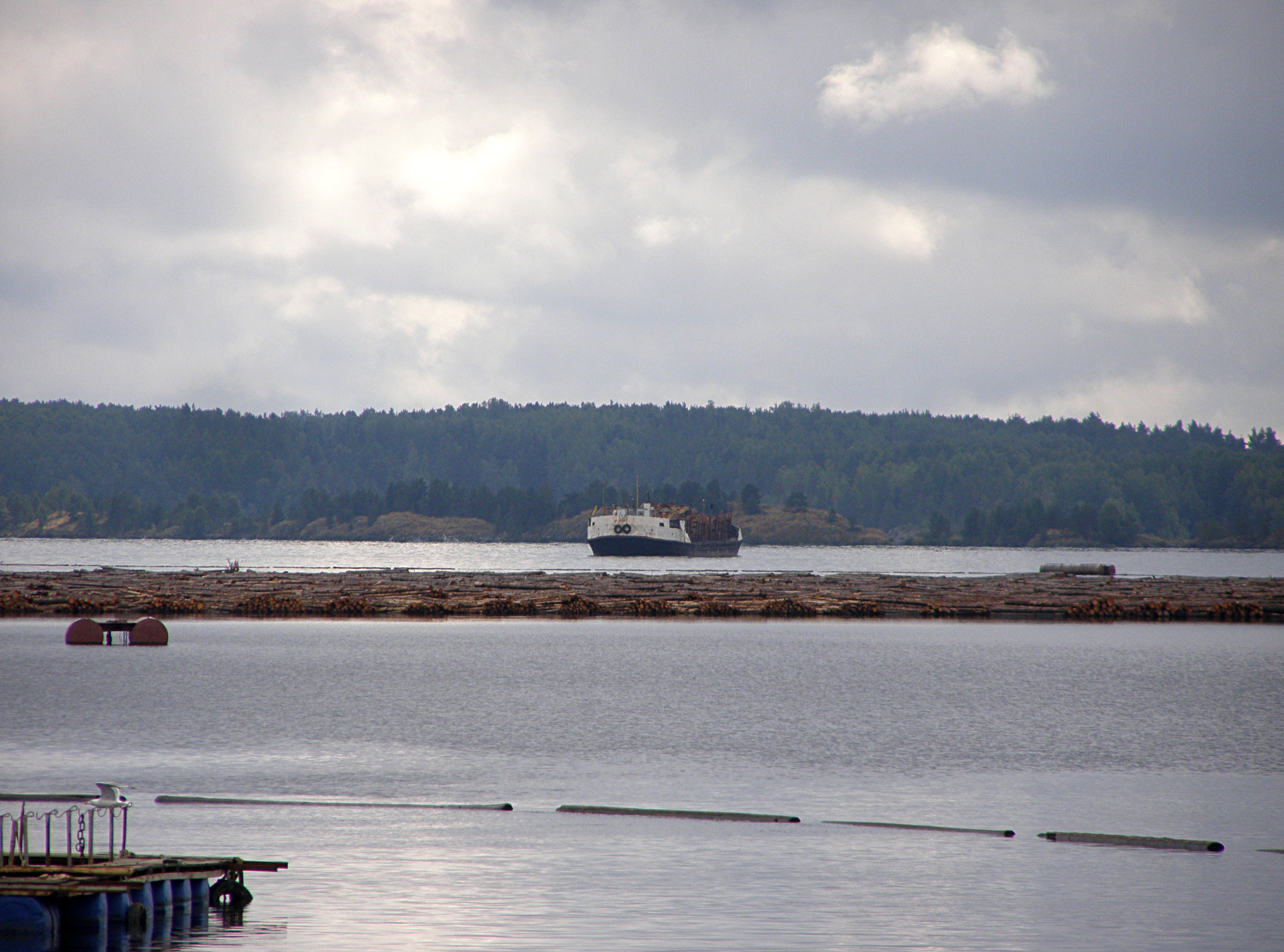
Kondopoga Bay, 2010

A city of Kondopoga is by the northern tip of the bay.

The bay has numerous rock islands, the largest being Suisari.
