= Kondopoga =

Town in the Republic of Karelia, Russia

Kondopoga Кондопога
- Town
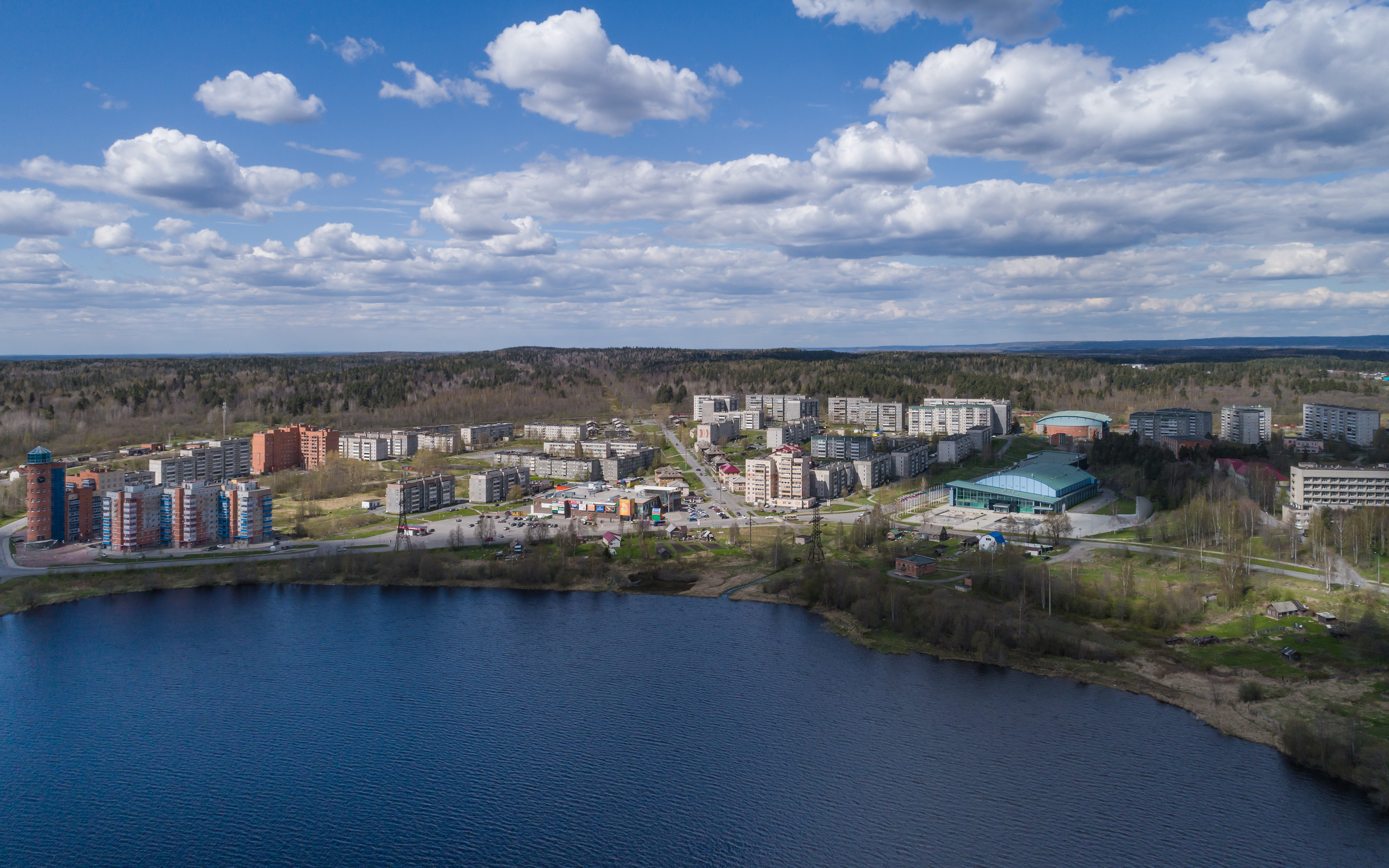
- Kondopoga Lotos Mall surroundings

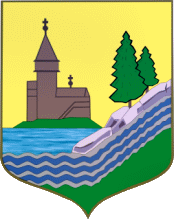
- Coat of arms
- Interactive map of Kondopoga
- Location of Kondopoga Kondopoga (Karelia)
- Coordinates: 62°12′N 34°17′E
- Country: Russia
- Federal subject: Republic of Karelia
- Administrative district: Kondopozhsky District
- First mentioned: 1563
- Town status since: 1938
- Elevation: 60 m (200 ft)

Population (2010 Census)
  - Total: 32,987
  - Estimate (2023): 25,295 (−23.3%)

Administrative status
  - Capital of: Kondopozhsky District

Municipal status
  - Municipal district: Kondopozhsky Municipal District
  - Urban settlement: Kondopozhskoye Urban Settlement
  - Capital of: Kondopozhsky Municipal District, Kondopozhskoye Urban Settlement
- Time zone: UTC+3 (UTC+03:00)
- Postal code: 186220–186225
- Dialing code: +7 81451
- OKTMO ID: 86615101001
- Website: www.kondopoga.ru

Kondopoga (Russian: Ко́ндопога) (Note: Ludian: Kompohd’; Livvi: Kondupohju; Finnish: Kontupohja) is a town and the administrative center of Kondopozhsky District of the Republic of Karelia, Russia, located by the northern tip of the Kondopoga Bay of Lake Onega, near the mouth of the Suna River and Kivach Nature Reserve, about 54 kilometers (34 mi) from Petrozavodsk. Population: 32,987 (2010 census); 34,863 (2002 census); 36,365 (1989 Soviet census).

== History ==
Historical affiliations

Tsardom of Russia 1563–1721
Russian Empire 1721–1917
Russian Republic 1917
Soviet Russia 1917–1922
Soviet Union 1922–1941
Republic of Finland 1941–1944
Soviet Union 1944–1991
Russian Federation 1991–present

The very first written reference to Kondopoga dates back to 1563. It became important after rich marble deposits were discovered nearby in 1757 and the quarries were founded. Kondopoga became a logistics hub for marble shipping to St. Petersburg. Later, iron ore deposits were found in the vicinity, which were shipped to metallurgical factories in Petrozavodsk and in Kentjärvi.

By 1892, Kondopoga had forty-eight buildings, three hundred inhabitants, two churches, and a college and held an annual trade fair on September 8–15.

During World War I, the Main Artillery Administrative Department of the Russian Military Ministry started construction of a nitric acid plant there, which was essential for gunpowder production. A hydroelectric power station was designed to meet considerable demand in the energy for such a plant. Kondopoga was well suitable for such a station due to significant water level drop between Lakes Nigozero and Onega. A 30 MW station was to become the largest in Russia. However, the October Revolution and the subsequent Civil War delayed the project, which was only revived in the Soviet time as a part of the GOELRO plan. According to the project, the waters of the Suna River were to be redirected towards the hydroelectric power station via the lake system. On July 19, 1923, Sovnarkhoz of Karelia ratified the formation of a building society (Kondostroy) to build a hydroelectric power station and a major pulp and paper mill. Kondopoga became the administrative center of a district in 1932 and was granted town status in 1938. At the time, its population was about fourteen thousand inhabitants.

On November 3, 1941, during World War II, Kondopoga was totally destroyed. Industrial plants and factories were looted, including the pulp and paper mill, hydroelectric station, granite and brick factories, furniture factory, and other facilities. Approximately 250 houses and apartment buildings were demolished along with concert halls, museums, kindergarten, school, hotels, fire station, and government offices. All bridges in the vicinity were blown up. The town was occupied by Red Army on June 28, 1944. After the war, the town was rebuilt. In 1957, Kondopoga was declared the All-Union Komsomol building site. A number of new factories were built and the pulp and paper mill was also expanded. The population grew to 38,000 people.

On the night of August 29–30, 2006, two ethnic Russians were killed and several others badly injured by Chechens, starting 2006 ethnic tensions in Kondopoga.

== Administrative and municipal status ==
Within the framework of administrative divisions, Kondopoga serves as the administrative center of Kondopozhsky District, to which it is directly subordinated. As a municipal division, the town of Kondopoga, together with three rural localities, is incorporated within Kondopozhsky Municipal District as Kondopozhskoye Urban Settlement.

== Economy and transportation ==
Kondopoga has a railway station on the Moscow–Murmansk railroad, some of the largest pulp and paper mills in Eastern Europe (e.g. OAO Kondopoga), the Petrozavodsk Forestry College branch, Olympic Reserve State College and facilities for the manufacture of building materials.

The Blue Highway, an international tourist route, starts in Mo i Rana, Norway, goes through Sweden and Finland, and then through Kondopoga, before ending in Pudozh.

=== Trading ===
An important sector of the city's economy is retail trade. Retail chains Pyaterochka, Magnit, Svetofor, DNS, Red&White, Fix Price and others operate in Kondopoga.

The largest shopping centers are the Lotus City and Ruby.

== Architecture ==
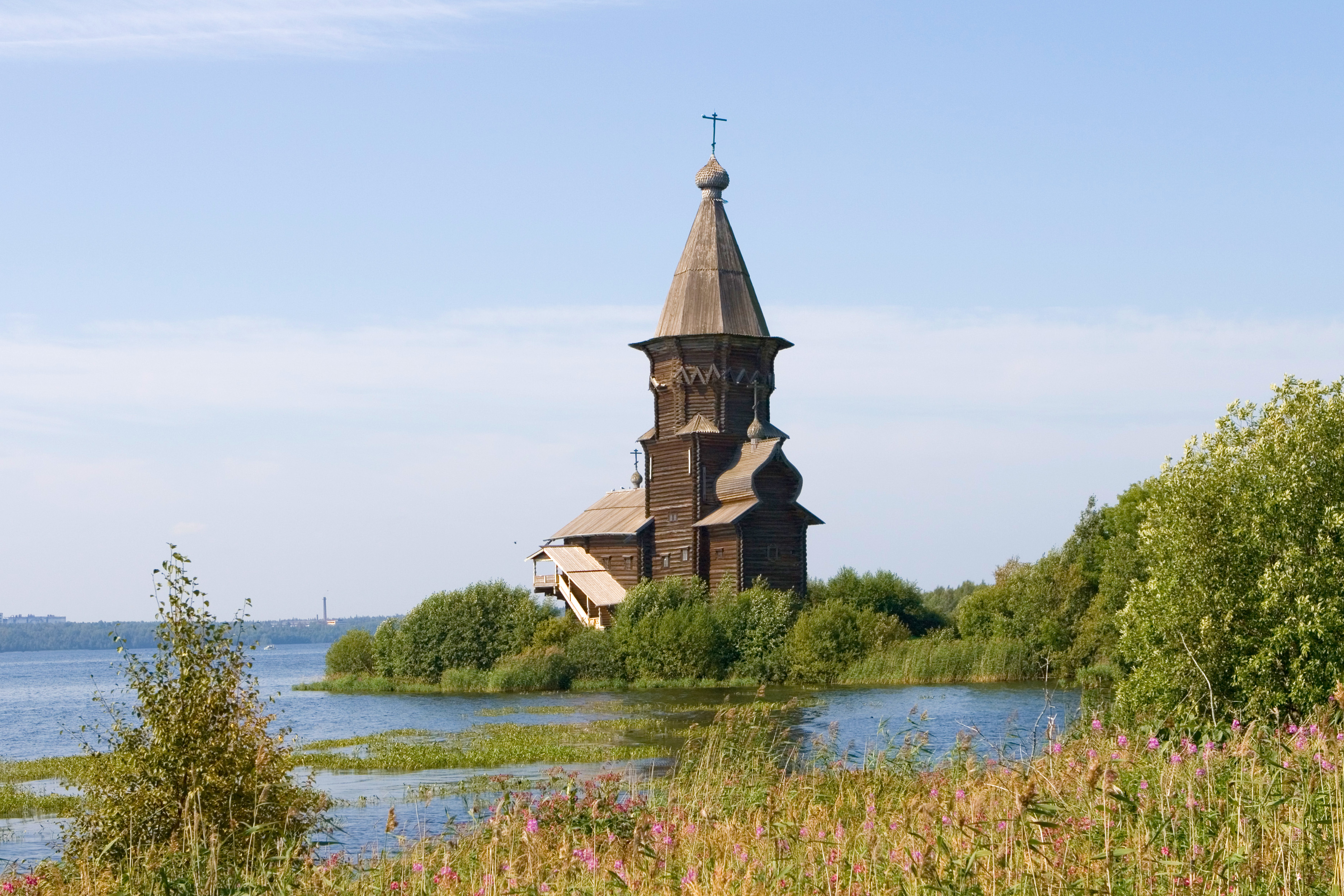
Dormition Church in Kondopoga

First recorded as early as 1495, Kondopoga retained a rare monument of Russian wooden architecture — the Dormition Church (Успенская церковь), built in 1774. The central column of this church was crowned by a hipped roof, 42 m in total height. The column was based on a central rectangular framework, with adjacent frameworks for the refectory and altar. The altar framework was covered by a traditional wooden roof, called a barrel roof.

The church was burnt down in 2018 by a mentally disordered teenager, with only a few charred remains left at its place.
