= Kondopozhsky District =

Kondopozhsky District Кондопожский район (Russian)
- District
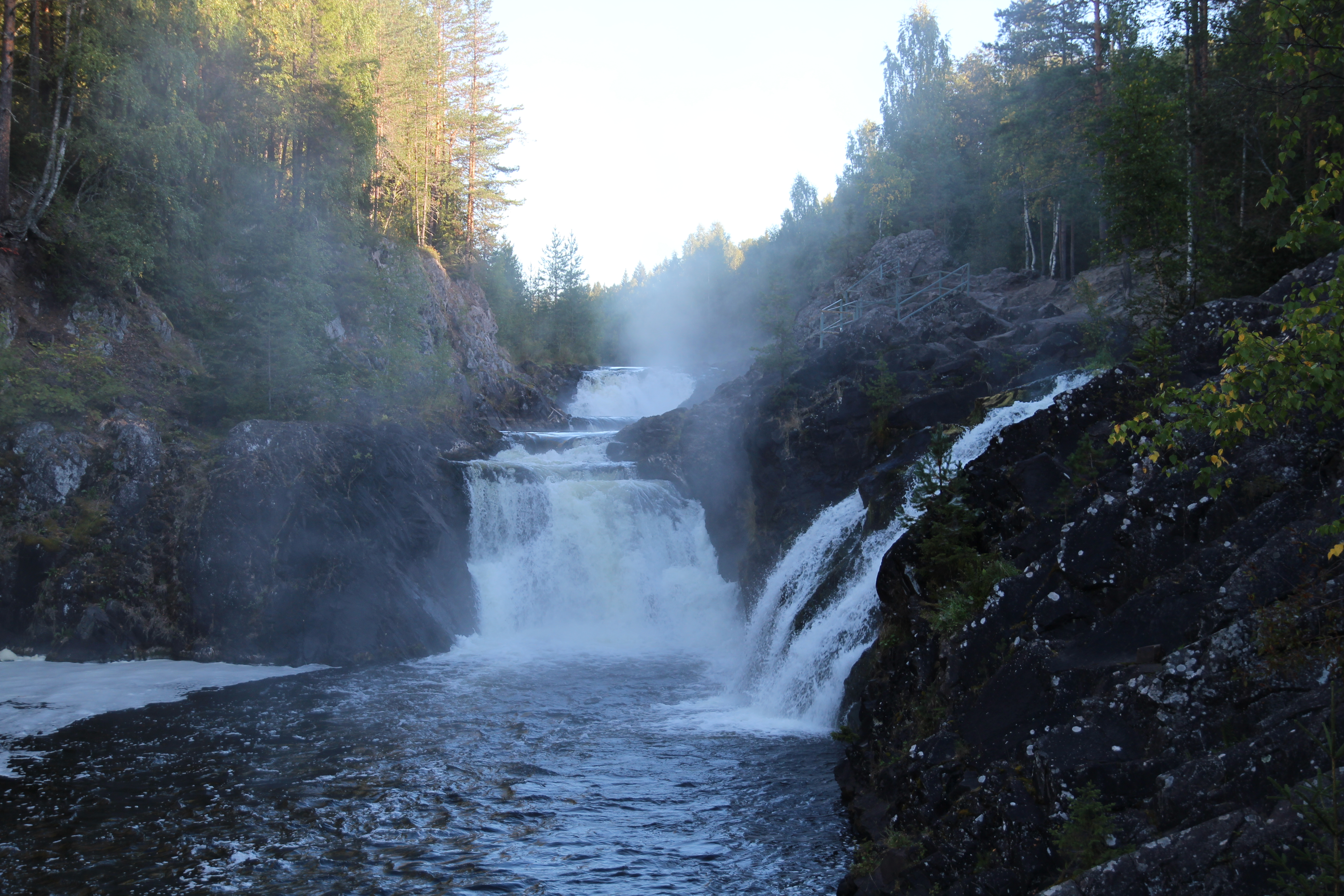
- Kivach Waterfall, a protected area of Russia in Kondopozhsky District

- Flag Coat of arms
- Location of Kondopozhsky District in the Republic of Karelia
- Coordinates: 62°12′N 34°16′E
- Country: Russia
- Federal subject: Republic of Karelia
- Established: 29 August 1927
- Administrative center: Kondopoga

Area
  - Total: 5,940 km^{2} (2,290 sq mi)

Population (2010 Census)
  - Total: 41,114
  - Density: 6.92/km^{2} (17.9/sq mi)
  - Urban: 80.2%
  - Rural: 19.8%

Administrative structure
  - Inhabited localities: 1 cities/towns, 77 rural localities

Municipal structure
  - Municipally incorporated as: Kondopozhsky Municipal District
  - Municipal divisions: 1 urban settlements, 8 rural settlements
- Time zone: UTC+3 (UTC+03:00)
- OKTMO ID: 86615000
- Website: http://amsu.kondopoga.ru

Population of Kondopozhsky District
- 2021 Census: 32,477
- 2010 Census: 41,114
- 2002 Census: 9,719
- 1989 Census: 48,274
- 1979 Census: 49,080

Kondopozhsky District (Russian: Кондопо́жский райо́н; Karelian: Kondupohjan piiri) is an administrative district (raion), one of fifteen in the Republic of Karelia, Russia. It is located in the south of the republic. The area of the district is 5,940 square kilometers (2,290 sq mi). Its administrative center is the town of Kondopoga. As of the 2010 Census, the total population of the district was 41,114, with the population of Kondopoga accounting for 80.2% of that number.

== Geography ==
Kondopozhsky District covers the forested lake area to the northwest of Lake Onega. The terrain is a combination of lakes, rocky ridges, glacial moraines, and glacial alluvial plains. The lakes and rivers are oriented northwest to southeast to flow into Lake Onega, and eventually into the Baltic Sea. The Kivach Nature Reserve is located in the District. it is a federal-level strict ecological reserve, established for the protection and scientific study of the taiga ecology of the region. A public access zone supports tourist visits to the Kivach Waterfall.

== Administrative and municipal status ==
Within the framework of administrative divisions, Kondopozhsky District is one of the fifteen in the Republic of Karelia and has administrative jurisdiction over one town (Kondopoga) and seventy-seven rural localities. As a municipal division, the district is incorporated as Kondopozhsky Municipal District. The town of Kondopoga and three rural localities are incorporated into an urban settlement, while the remaining seventy-four rural localities are incorporated into eight rural settlements within the municipal district. The town of Kondopoga serves as the administrative center of both the administrative and municipal district.

== Economy ==
The main industries of the district include: pulp and paper production (JSC "Kondopoga"), stone processing and stone casting, logging and woodworking, production of building materials.

In addition, about 50% of the reserves of titanomagnetite ores of Karelia are concentrated in the area, and there are also significant reserves of building stones — diabases, dolomites, granites in the area. There are mineral water sources.

There are two hydroelectric power plants operating in the district: Kondopozhskaya and Paleozerskaya HPP, which are part of a single Sunsky cascade, with a total capacity of 50.6 MW and generate an average of 245 million kWh of renewable electricity per year.
