= Võnnu Parish =

Former municipality of Estonia

Coordinates: 58°17′N 27°3′E

Võnnu Parish Võnnu vald
- Former municipality of Estonia
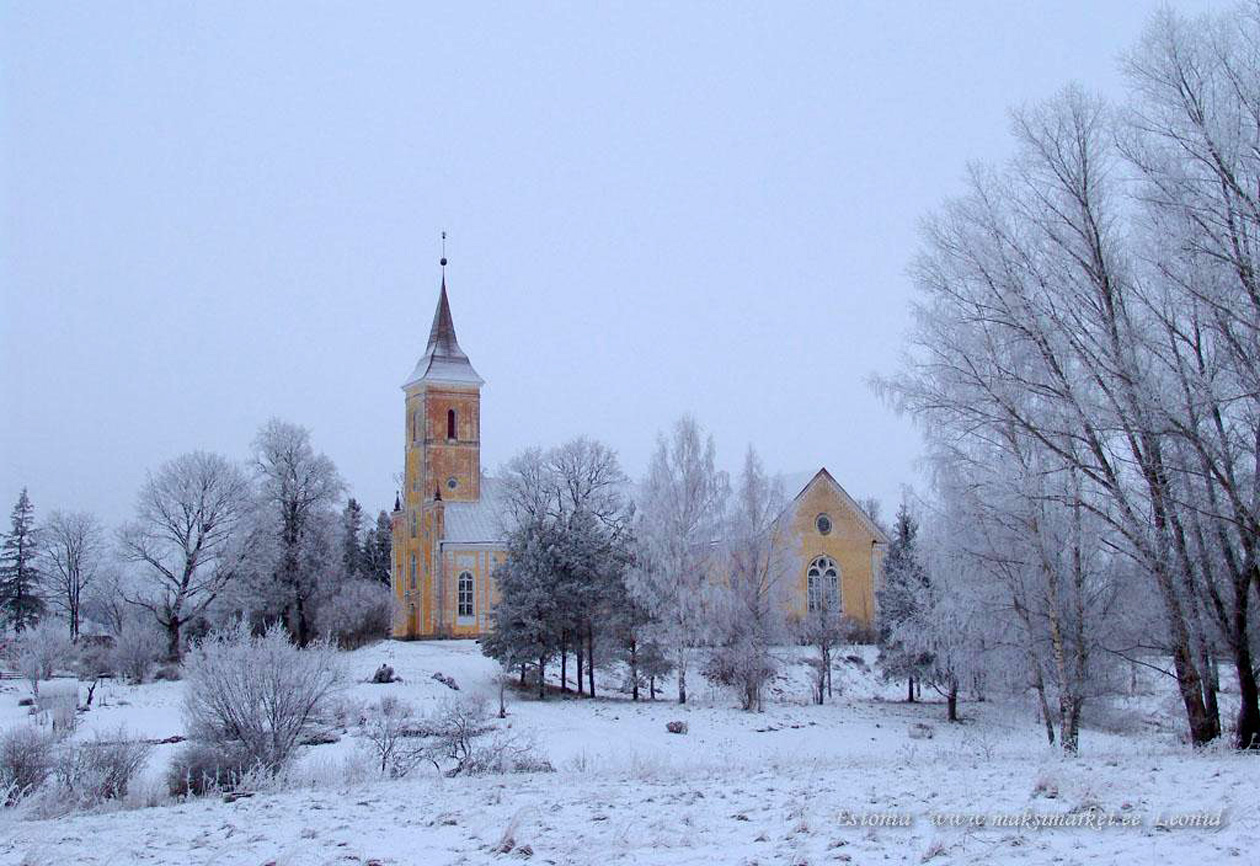
- Võnnu church

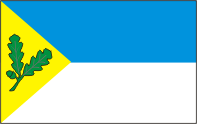
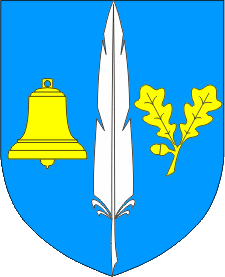
- Flag Coat of arms

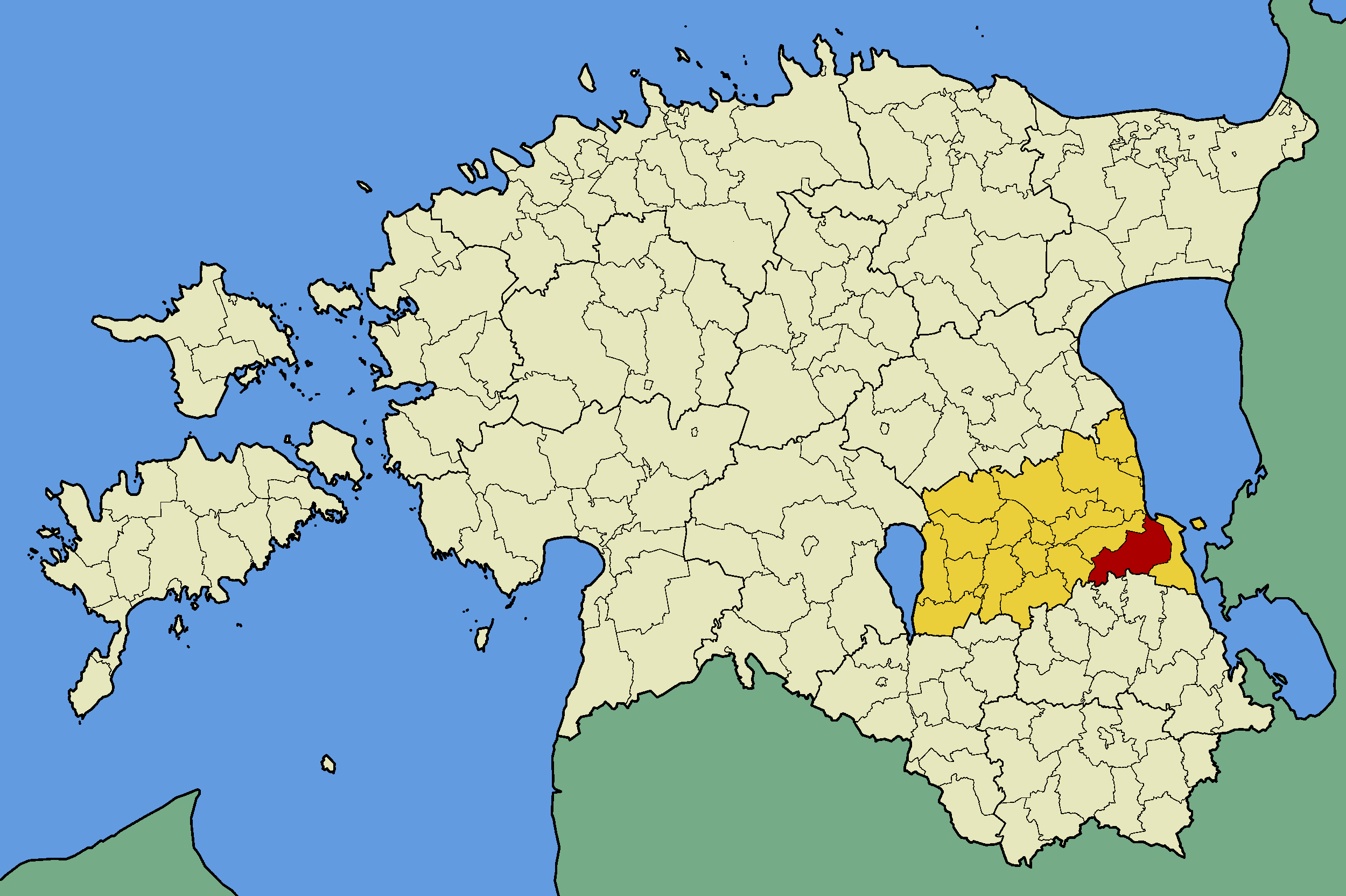
- Võnnu Parish within Tartu County.
- Country: Estonia
- County: Tartu County
- Administrative centre: Võnnu
- Website: www.vonnu.ee

Võnnu Parish was a rural municipality in Tartu County, Estonia.

== Settlements ==
Small borough

Võnnu

Villages

Agali - Ahunapalu - Hammaste - Imste - Issaku - Kannu - Kõnnu - Kurista - Lääniste - Liispõllu - Rookse - Terikeste

== Twin towns ==
- Kyyjärvi, Finland

== Gallery ==
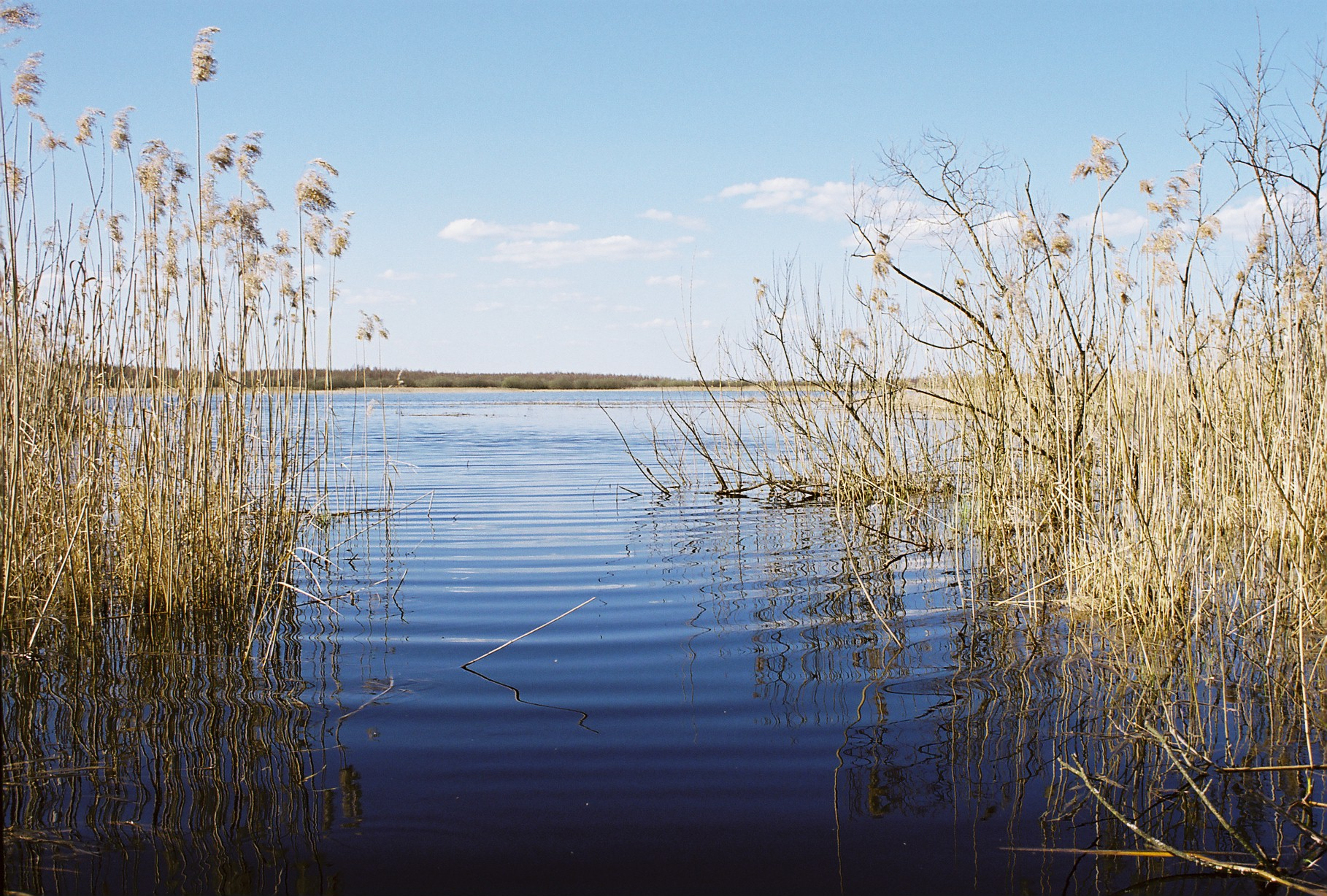
Lake Ahijärv near Lääniste
