= Ahijärv =

Ahijärv is the name of several lakes in Estonia:

- Ähijärv (Ähijärve), a lake in the village of Ähijärve in Antsla Parish, Võru County
- Ahijärv (Ahunapalu), a lake in the village of Ahunapalu in Võnnu Parish, Tartu County
- Ahijärv (Koloreino), a lake in the village of Koloreino in Võru Parish, Võru County
