= Võnnu (disambiguation) =

Võnnu is a small borough in Võnnu Parish, Tartu County, Estonia.

Võnnu may also refer to:

- Võnnu, Lääne County, Estonia, a village
- Võnnu Parish, Tartu County, Estonia, a municipality
- Võnnu, the Estonian name for Cēsis, Latvia
