= Kurista =

Kurista may refer to several places in Estonia:

- Kurista, Jõgeva County, village in Jõgeva Parish, Jõgeva County
- Kurista, Tartu County, village in Kastre Parish, Tartu County
