= Kannu =

Kannu may refer to:

- Kannu, Tartu County, a village in Estonia
- Kannu, Võru County, a village in Estonia
- Kannu (learning management system), for music, arts and alternative education.
