= Nopola =

Village in Central Finland, Finland

Nopola Kyyjärven kirkonkylä
- Municipal centre
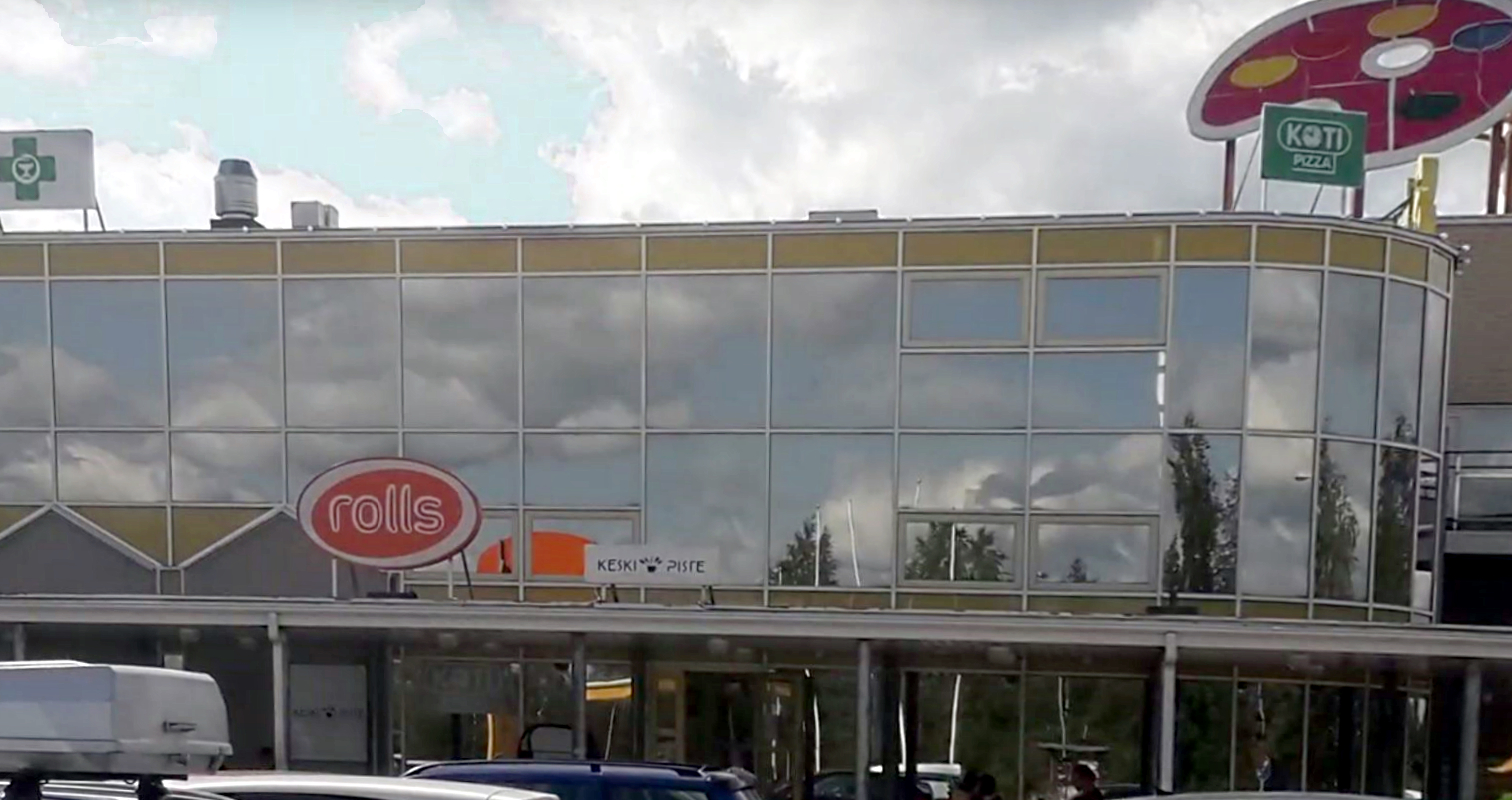
- Paletti Shopping Centre

- Location in Finland
- Coordinates: 63°02′35.16″N 24°33′56.16″E
- Country: Finland
- Region: Central Finland
- Municipality: Kyyjärvi

Area
  - Total: 3.55 km^{2} (1.37 sq mi)

Population (31 December 2023)
  - Total: 661
  - Density: 1,862/km^{2} (4,820/sq mi)
- Time zone: UTC+2 (EET)
  - Summer (DST): UTC+3 (EEST)
- Postal code: 43700

Nopola (officially Kyyjärven kirkonkylä; lit. 'Kyyjärvi church village') is the administrative center of the Kyyjärvi municipality in Central Finland, Finland, and also its only urban area with a population of over 600 inhabitants.

The village is located on the southwestern shore of Lake Kyyjärvi as Highway 13 passes through the village near the lake. It has a stone church built in 1953. Near the intersection of Highways 13 and 16 is the Paletti shopping center, completed in 1999. Other services in the village include a municipal library, an elementary school, and a fire station. The Nopola News, which provides local news, has been operating from the village since 2005.

Kyyjärvi Camping, which offers accommodation, is located about 2 kilometres (1.2 mi) east of the village center on the lakeshore.

== See also ==
- Finnish national road 77 – other highway near the village
