= Pääjärvi =

Pääjärvi may refer to:

== Lakes ==
- Lake Pyaozero (Finnish: Pääjärvi), located in the Republic of Karelia, Russia
- Pääjärvi (Karstula), located in Karstula in the region of Keski-Suomi, Finland
- Pääjärvi (Lammi), located between the cities of Hämeenlinna and Hämeenkoski, Finland

== Settlements ==
- Pyaozersky, a settlement in the Republic of Karelia, Russia, called Pääjärvi in Finnish

== People ==
- Jörgen Pääjärvi (born 1969), Swedish freestyle skier
- Magnus Pääjärvi (born 1991), Swedish ice hockey player
