= Hoikka =

Hoikka may refer to:

== Geography ==
- Hoikka, Hyrynsalmi, a village in Hyrynsalmi, Finland
- Hoikka, Joensuu, a village in Joensuu, Finland
- Hoikka, Tuusniemi, a village in Tuusniemi, Finland

== People with the surname ==
- Iisakki Hoikka (1840–1917), Finnish politician
- Lasse Hoikka, Finnish singer
- Matti Hoikka (1859–1939), Finnish politician
