= Martin Körber =

Baltic German pastor, composer

Martin Georg Emil Körber (29 July [O.S. 17 July] 1817 in Võnnu – 19 April [O.S. 7 April] 1893 in Kuressaare) was a Baltic German pastor, composer, writer and choir leader.

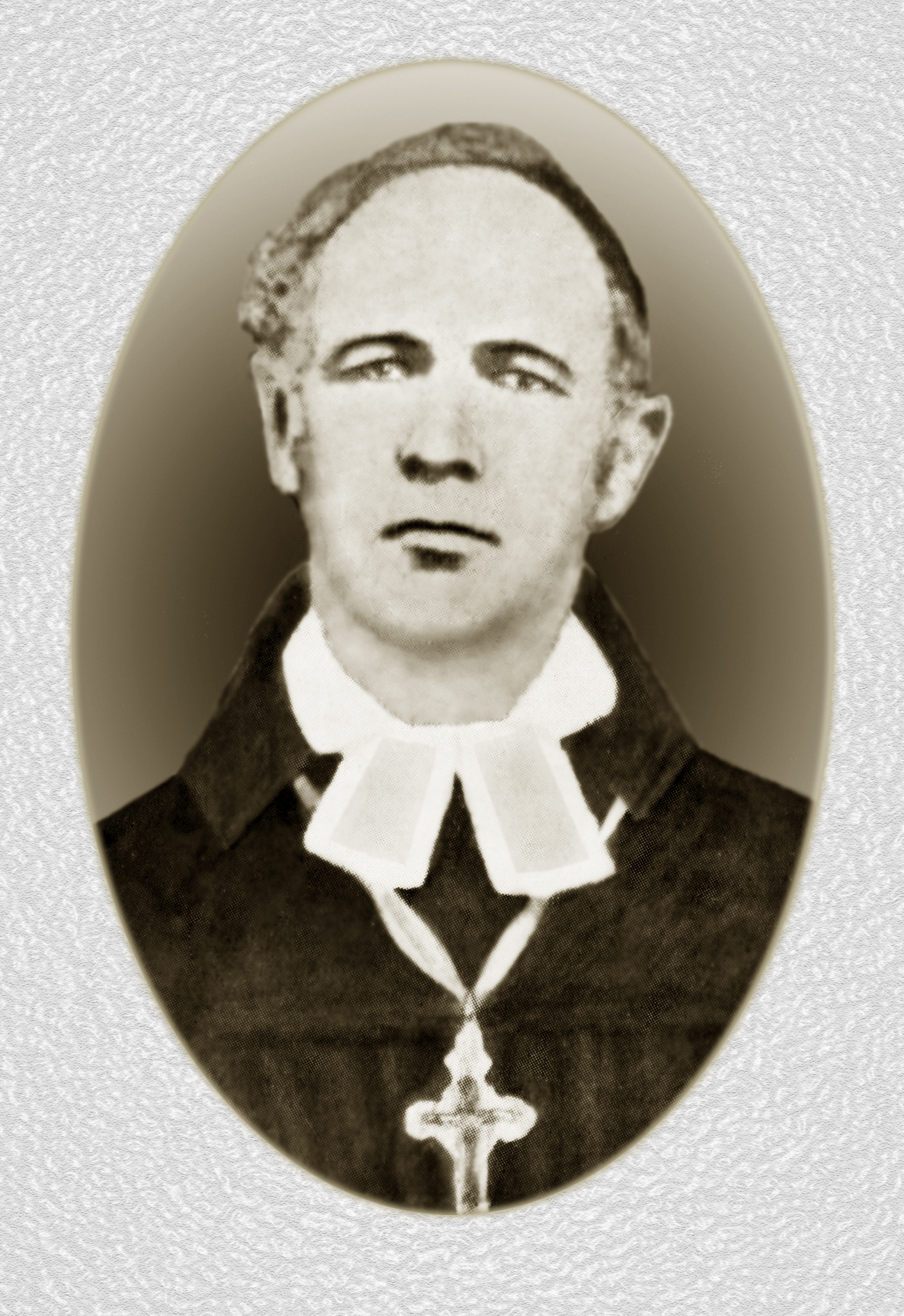
Martin Körber

== Life ==
Martin Georg Emil Körber was the son of Pastor Edward Philipp Körber (1770-1850). He studied theology at the University of Tartu. His older brother was pastor and writer Carl Eduard Körber (1802–1883).

He was a teacher in Kuressaare from 1842 to 1845. In 1846 he became the pastor in Anseküla, where he founded a choir. In July 1862, he organized a choral concert in Kuressaare. On May 21, 1863, he organized one of the first song festivals in Estonia on the Sõrve Peninsula. After retiring in 1875, he moved to Kuressaare and continued writing. He died in 1893.

== Works ==
His songbooks included over 1000 sacred and secular songs in German and Estonian. In 1846, he published a catechism. Over 300 000 copies were printed. He published a three-volume history of Saaremaa in German, called Oesel Einst und Jetzt (Saaremaa, then and now) between 1887 and 1915.

== See also ==
- Culture of Estonia
