= Nätti-Jussi =

Finnish forest laborer

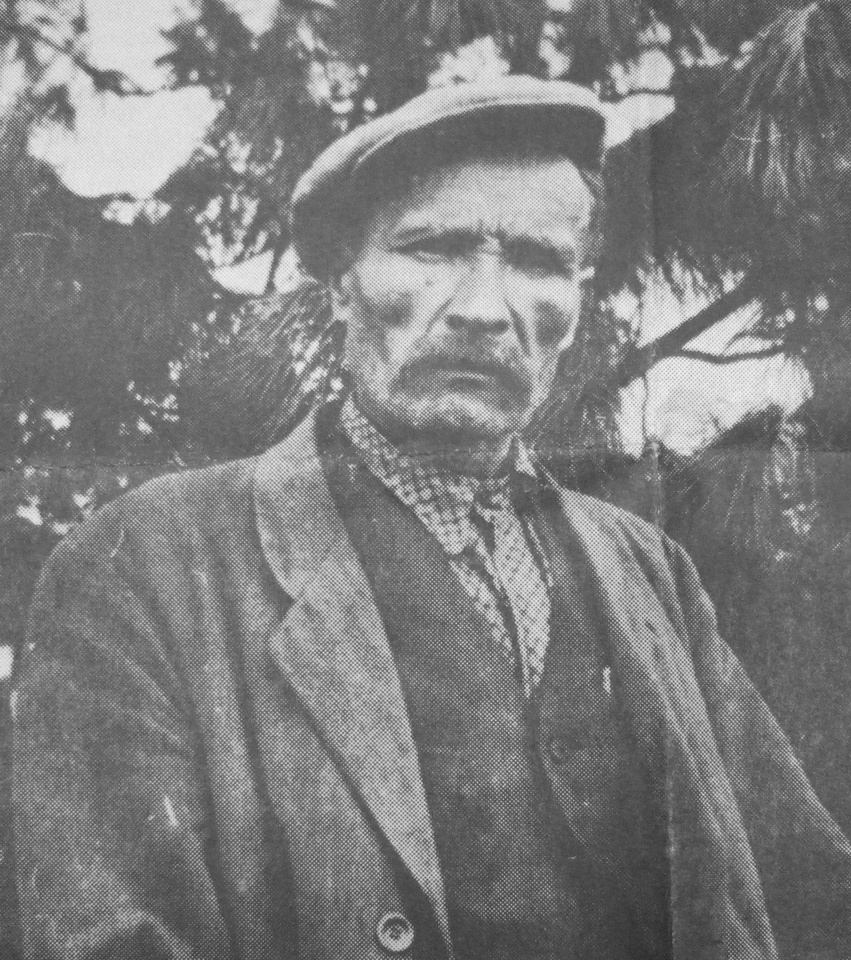
- Nätti-Jussi
- Born: Johan Viktor Nätti; 31 August 1890; Karstula, Grand Duchy of Finland
- Died: 4 August 1964 (aged 73); Rovaniemi, Finland
- Occupation: Forest laborer

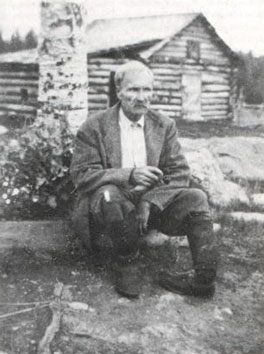
Nätti-Jussi and his clubfoot

Juho Vihtori (Johan Viktor) Nätti (31 August 1890 – 4 August 1964), known as "Nätti-Jussi" (Finnish pronunciation: [ˈnætːi ˈjusːi]; English: "Pretty-John") was a Finnish forest laborer. The stories told by Nätti made him a legendary figure, particularly in Lapland. Nätti was born to a six-member family in Karstula, Central Finland, in August 1890. His parents were log driver Juho Nätti and hostess Maija Nätti. He had three sisters. Nätti migrated with other members of his family to the Northern logging sites, and worked there for most of his life. He was a well-known lumberjack who was known in Tervola, Pisa, Muurola and Rovaniemi.

== Life ==
Nätti was also known for his clubfoot: his left foot had turned backwards. From the 1950s on, Nätti was paralysed and was admitted into the Rautiosaari nursing home in Rovaniemi. Nätti died in the Palosalmi nursing home for lumberjacks on 4 August 1964. He was buried in the Rovaniemi Viirinkangas cemetery in a common burial plot reserved for the Palosalmi residents.

Nätti got his own grave marker at the cemetery in the summer of 2006; the unveiling took place on 25 August 2006. The grave marker has a quote from Nätti-Jussi himself: "Over there, I was. Spoke with St. Peter about the sights for the coming winter, and agreed to work with him on a contractual basis, going about lighting the Northern Lights."

== Nätti-Jussi name used for other purposes ==
The first pizzeria in Rovaniemi was named "Il Bel Giovanni", Italian for Nätti-Jussi. In the late 1990s the Nätti room Muurola restaurant was established in former rural municipality of Rovaniemi. In 2003, Karstula founded the Nätti-Jussi restaurant. Vaasan & Vaasan bakery also manufactures Lapland Pakari Nätti-Jussi called rye bread.

== Publications ==
In the 1970s, journalist and writer Pentti Harjumaa published two thin books of Nätti-Jussi stories which have also been published as a single volume. A CD-album about his life called Tarua ja totta was released in March 2008. The album includes interviews of people who were involved with Nätti and four songs performed by Souvarit. In addition, the album begins with a song about Nätti-Jussi, the first and last verses of which are sung. The verses in the middle are recited. The interviews released on the album have been collected for the C-cassette released in 1994. Yhdentoista virran maa, a song by Mikko Alatalo, mentions Nätti-Jussi as one of the Northern Finnish legends.

== Bibliography ==
- Lehtinen, Lasse: Nätti-Jussi. Finnish adventurer biography. Espoo: Paasilinna, 2012. ISBN 978-952-5856-65-1.
