= Karstula =

- Municipality
- Karstulan kunta Karstula kommun
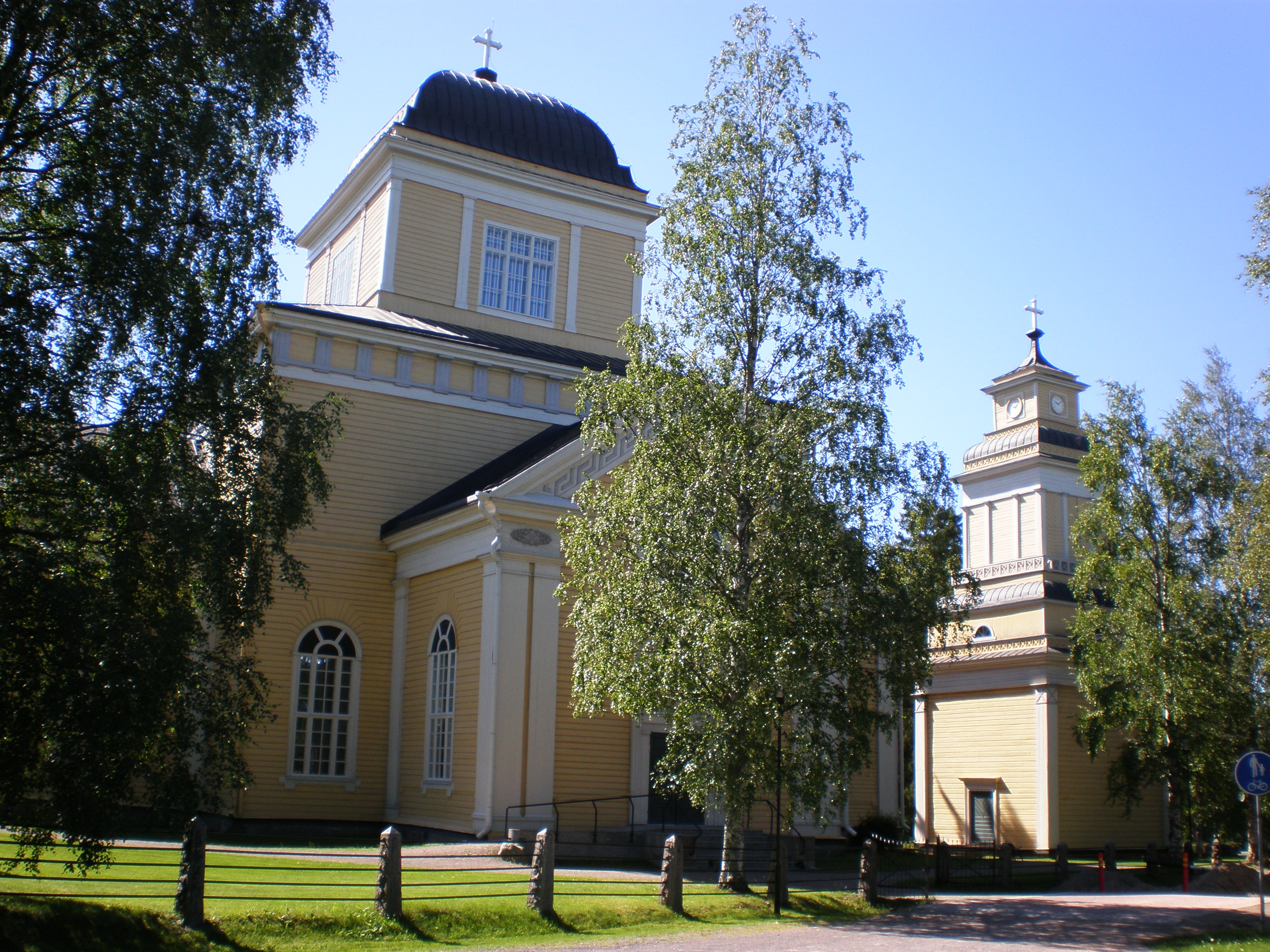
- Karstula Church

- Coat of arms

- Location of Karstula in Finland
- Interactive map of Karstula
- Coordinates: 62°52.5′N 024°48′E
- Country: Finland
- Region: Central Finland
- Sub-region: Saarijärvi–Viitasaari sub-region
- Charter: 1867

Government
  - Municipal manager: Eino Nissinen

Area (2018-01-01)
  - Total: 963.19 km^{2} (371.89 sq mi)
  - Land: 887.06 km^{2} (342.50 sq mi)
  - Water: 76.22 km^{2} (29.43 sq mi)
  - Rank: 86th largest in Finland

Population (2025-12-31)
  - Total: 3,514
  - Rank: 201st largest in Finland
  - Density: 3.96/km^{2} (10.3/sq mi)

Population by native language
  - Finnish: 97.2% (official)
  - Others: 2.8%

Population by age
  - 0 to 14: 12.3%
  - 15 to 64: 52.8%
  - 65 or older: 34.9%
- Time zone: UTC+02:00 (EET)
  - Summer (DST): UTC+03:00 (EEST)
- Website: karstula.fi/briefly-in-english/

Karstula is a municipality of Finland founded in 1867. It is located in the Central Finland region. The municipality has a population of 3,514 (31 December 2025) and covers an area of 963.19 square kilometres (371.89 sq mi) of which 76.22 km^{2} (29.43 sq mi) is water. The population density is 3.96 inhabitants per square kilometre (10.3/sq mi).

Neighbouring municipalities are Kannonkoski, Kivijärvi, Kyyjärvi, Saarijärvi, and Soini. There are all together 159 lakes in Karstula, the biggest lakes being Pääjärvi, Enonjärvi and Vahanka.

The subject of the coat of arms refers to Karstula's position as the "gateway to Ostrobothnia", as the inland routes to Ostrobothnia have passed through Karstula in ancient times and still do today. The coat of arms was designed by Ahti Hammar, and the Karstula municipal council approved it at its meeting on 9 March 1953. The Ministry of the Interior confirmed the coat of arms for use on 16 July of the same year.

== History ==
The name of Karstula is likely derived from the Savonian surname Karstunen, encountered around Ristiina since 1541. First records of the surname in Northern Tavastia (modern Central Finland) are from the 18th century. Karstula was initially a part of the Saarijärvi parish, acquiring chapel rights in 1775 under it. Karstula was allowed to become a separate parish and municipality in 1858, but separated later in 1887. Kyyjärvi was a part of Karstula until 1929, though it only acquired a separate parish in 1944.

=== Suomenselkä municipality ===
Kannonkoski, Karstula, Kivijärvi and Kyyjärvi had planned to merge into the Suomenselkä municipality from January 1, 2022. Karstula, Kivijärvi and Kyyjärvi accepted the merger proposal, but Kannonkoski did not. After Kannonkoski opted out of the planned merger, Kivijärvi also left out. The merger project of the remaining Karstula and Kyyjärvi failed at the Kyyjärvi municipal council meeting held on May 17, 2021, and the Ministry of Finance did not propose a forced merger either.

== Architecture ==
- A number of historical buildings (from the beginning of the 20th century) has been preserved in the village centre, representing the original countryside buildings of the region.
- There's also a cottage designed by Alvar Aalto, though it is not listed in most Aalto's biographies.

== Transport ==
Highway 13 between Kokkola and Lappeenranta, main road 58 between Kangasala and Kärsämäki and main road 77 between Kyyjärvi and Siilinjärvi pass through the Karstula municipality.

Karstula is served by OnniBus.com route Helsinki—Jyväskylä—Kokkola.

== Notable people ==
- Artturi Koskinen (1904–1981), Member of Parliament
- Jarmo Mäkinen (born 1958), actor
- Nätti-Jussi (1890–1964), legendary lumberjack
- Harri Koskinen (born 1970), designer

== Culture ==
=== Events ===
- The International Shooting Week

=== Food ===
In the 1980s, flour-potato porridge and piimävelli—a gruel of soured milk sweetened with syrup and including dough-raisin clumps and/or pieces of leipäjuusto—were named Karstula's traditional parish dishes.

== Twin cities ==
- Broby Municipality, Denmark
- Ragunda, Sweden
- Stjørdal, Norway

== Gallery ==
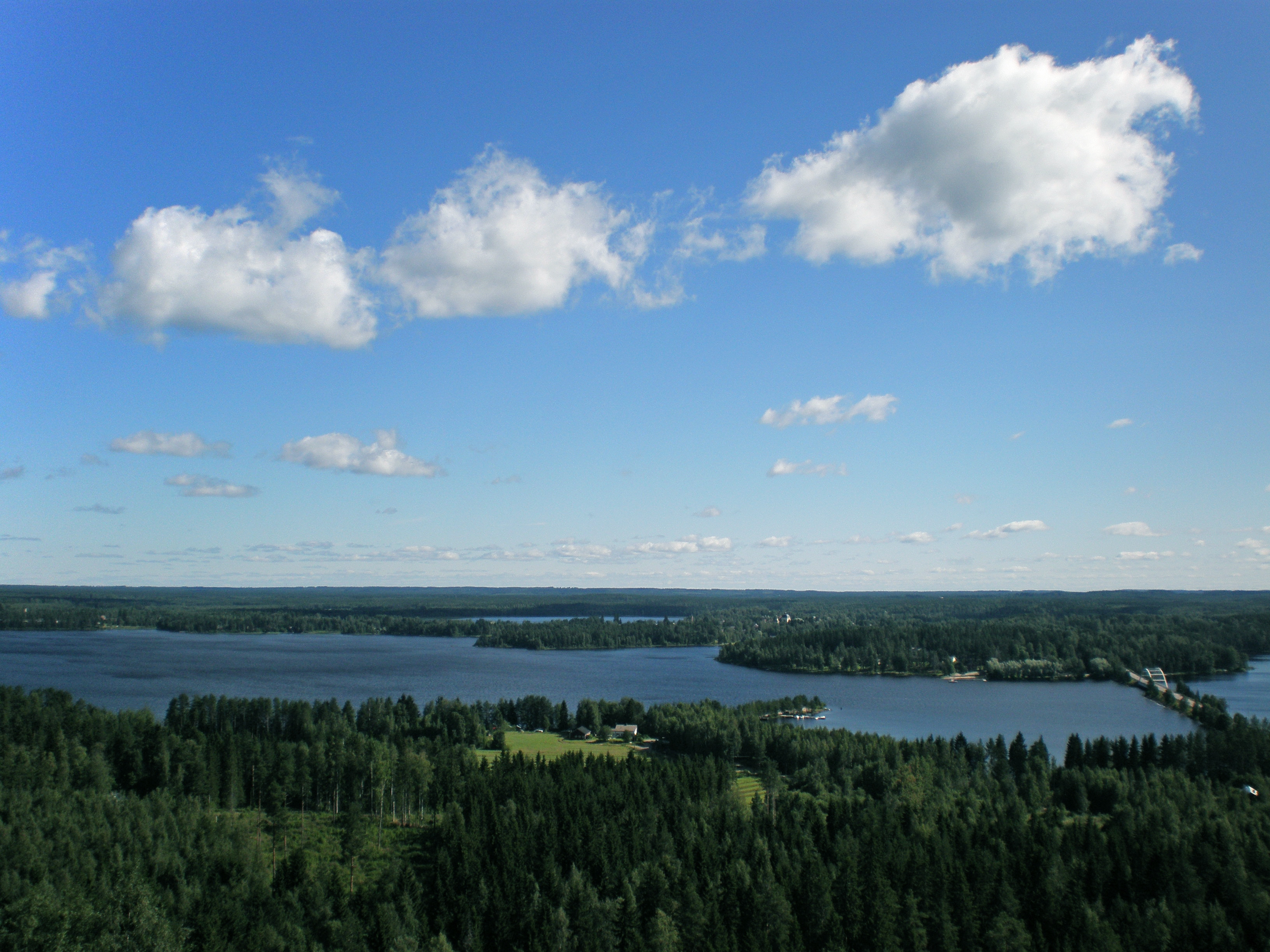
Pääjärvi is the largest lake in Karstula.

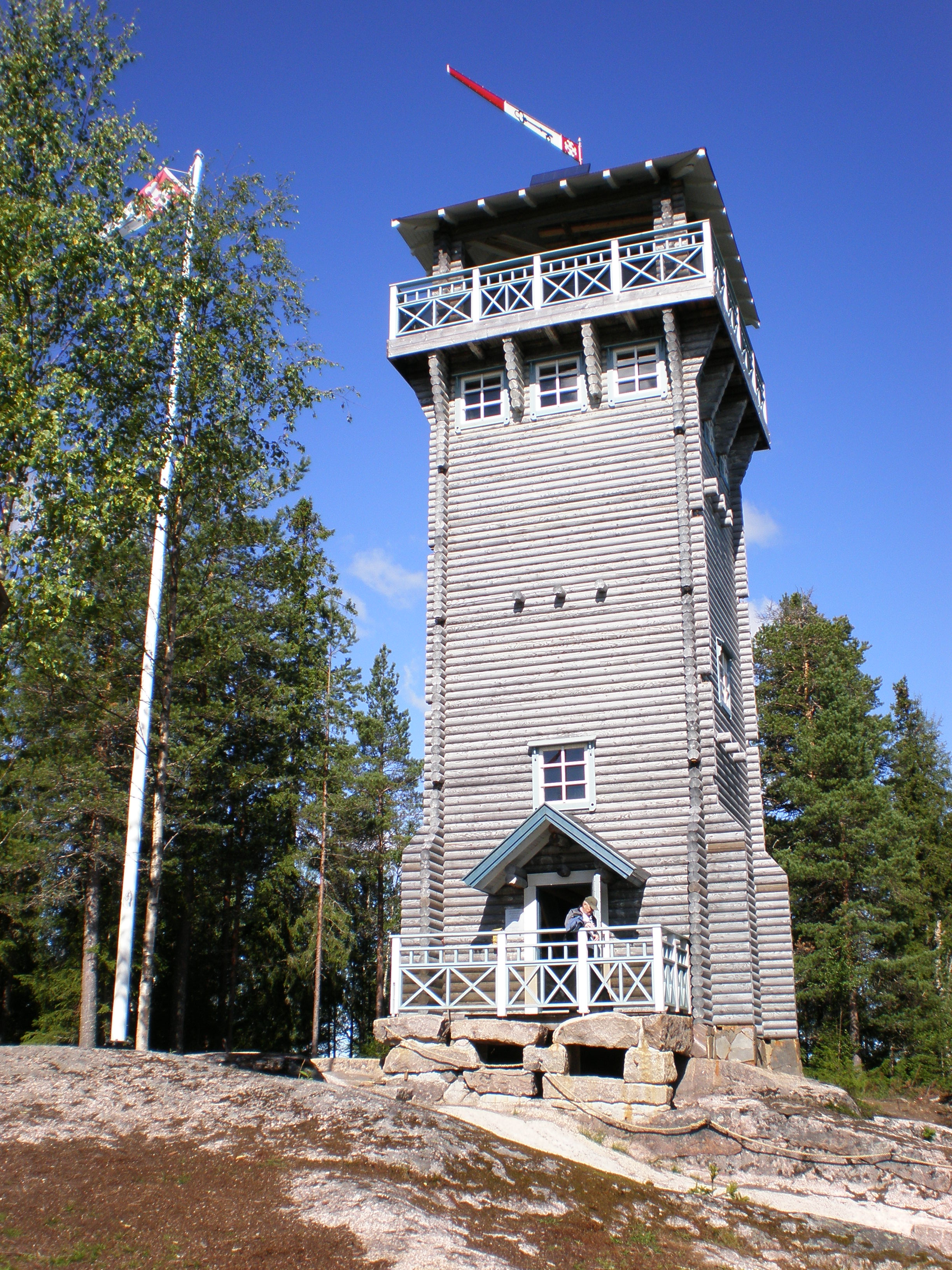
Kirkkovuori observation tower.

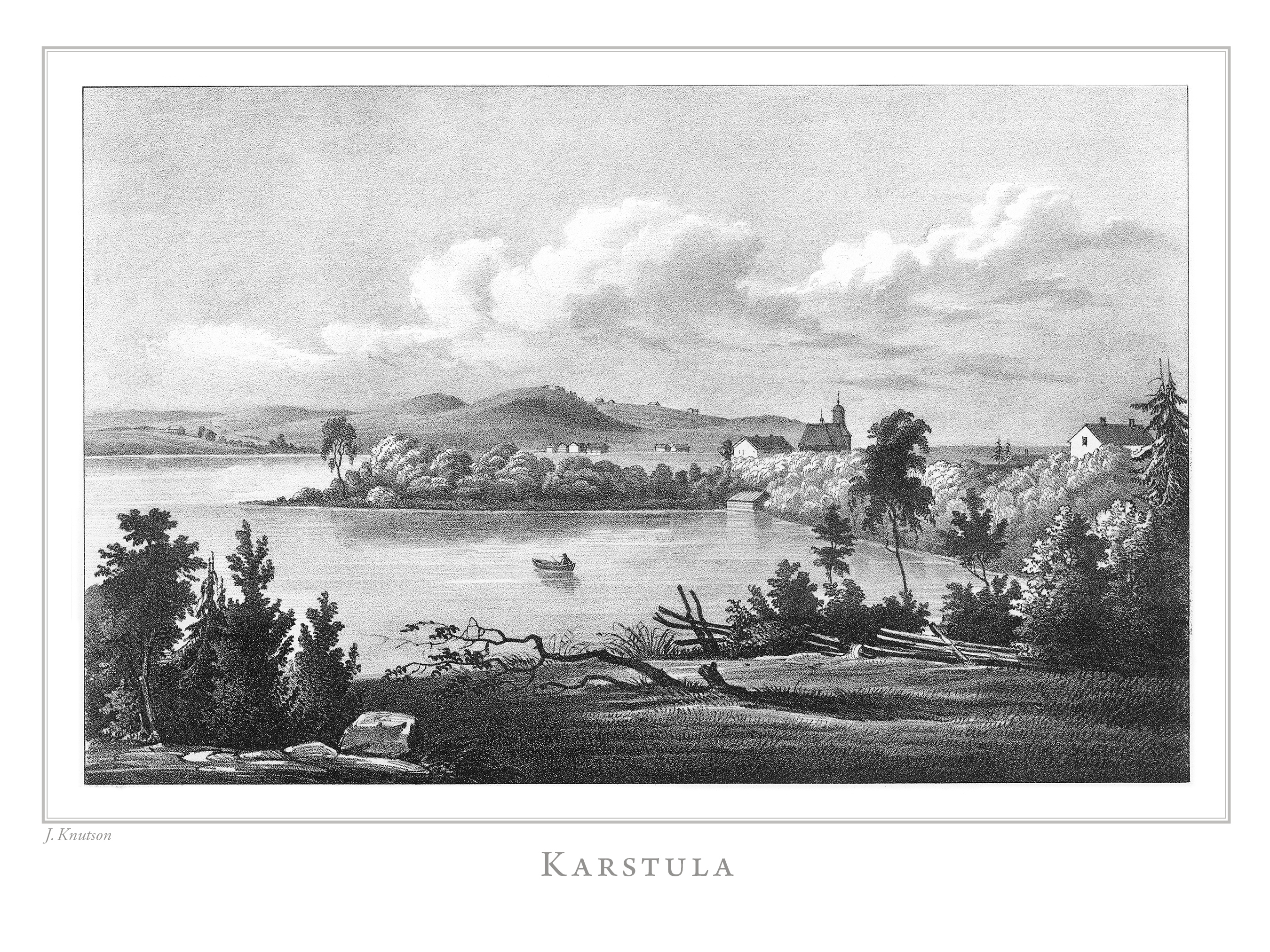
Illustration of Karstula in Finland framstäldt i teckningar edited by Zacharias Topelius and published 1845-1852.
