= Enonjärvi =

Lake in Finland

- Location within Finland
- Location: Karstula, Kannonkoski
- Coordinates: 62°55′N 25°11′E
- Lake type: Natural
- Primary outflows: Pajusalmi
- Catchment area: Kymijoki
- Basin countries: Finland
- Surface area: 8.43 km^{2} (3.25 sq mi)
- Average depth: 6.29 m (20.6 ft)
- Max. depth: 18.78 m (61.6 ft)
- Water volume: 0.053 km^{3} (43,000 acre⋅ft)
- Shore length^{1}: 37.87 km (23.53 mi)
- Surface elevation: 140.8 m (462 ft)
- Frozen: December–April
- Islands: Enonsaari
- ^{1} Shore length is not a well-defined measure.

Enonjärvi is a rather small lake of Finland in northern Central Finland, in Karstula and Kannonkoski municipalities. It belongs to Kymijoki main catchment area. The outflow of water is via Pajusalmi to lake Kannonselkä.

== See also ==
- List of lakes in Finland
