= Liispõllu =

Village in Estonia

- village
- Location in Estonia
- Coordinates: 58°16′11″N 27°15′56″E
- Country: Estonia
- County: Tartu County
- Municipality: Kastre Parish

Population (01.01.2000)
  - Total: 13

Liispõllu is a village in Kastre Parish, Tartu County, Estonia. It's located about 12 km (7 mi) east of Võnnu and about 33 km (21 mi) southeast of the city of Tartu. In 2000 Liispõllu had a population of 13.
