= Vehkaperä =

Village in Finland

Coordinates: 62.999°N 24.341°E

Vehkaperä is a village located within the municipality of Kyyjärvi, Finland. The village is located about fifteen kilometers from the center of the municipality. The village is known for, among other things, Central Finland's largest peat production area, ranging from four municipalities within the region.
