= Cyrillus Kreek =

Estonian composer (1889–1962)

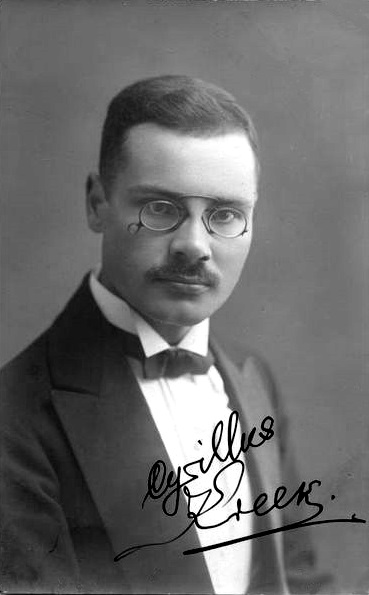
- Born: Karl Ustav Kreek; 3 December 1889; Võnnu, Governorate of Estonia, Russian Empire
- Died: 26 March 1962 (aged 72); Haapsalu, then part of Estonian SSR, Soviet Union
- Education: Saint Petersburg Conservatory
- Occupation: Composer
- Years active: 1911–1962

Cyrillus Kreek (born Karl Ustav Kreek; 3 December [O.S. 21 November] 1889 in Võnnu, Lääne county – 26 March 1962 in Haapsalu) was an Estonian composer.

Kreek studied trombone and composition at the Saint Petersburg Conservatory from 1908 to 1916 in the years immediately prior to the Russian Revolution, then worked as music teacher first in his native Haapsalu (in western Estonia), at the Tartu Higher Music College and later at the Tallinn Conservatory.

Kreek started collecting religious folksongs in 1911 in the Haapsalu region. He systematically collected the folk music of his native country, and many of his folk melody arrangements have since become part of the permanent repertoire of Estonian choral societies. He was the first Estonian collector to use the phonograph for this purpose and the harmonisations he made became a lifelong preoccupation. His beautiful psalm settings have an unmistakable folk tinge, and yet they are much more than simple folksong arrangements, with their carefully graded choral colouring and passing use of imitation. Kreek's magnum opus was his Requiem, using an Estonian translation of the text of Mozart's Requiem, but his essence is perfectly expressed in these choral miniatures. Cyrillus Kreek also achieved renown as an instrumental composer with his Musica sacra, a Humoreske for orchestra, and a Suite for zithers and orchestra.

== Compositions ==
- Reekviem (1927)
- Musica sacra (for orchestra, 1943)
- Armastuslaul 13. sajandist (for orchestra, 1943)
- Kalevipoeg nõiakoopas (cantata, 1953)
- Setu sümfoonia (for orchestra, 1953)
