= Aino Thauvón-Suits =

Finnish author

Aino Emilia Thauvón-Suits (9 November 1884 in Haapajärvi – 8 August 1969 in Gothenburg) was a Finnish author and translator, best known for her novels Tuntemani Eino Leino – kärsivä ihminen (1958) and Gustav Suitsu noorus: kirjade, luuletuste ja mälestuste põhjal (1997). She was married to Gustav Suits.
