= Kyyjärvi =

- Municipality
- Kyyjärven kunta Kyyjärvi kommun
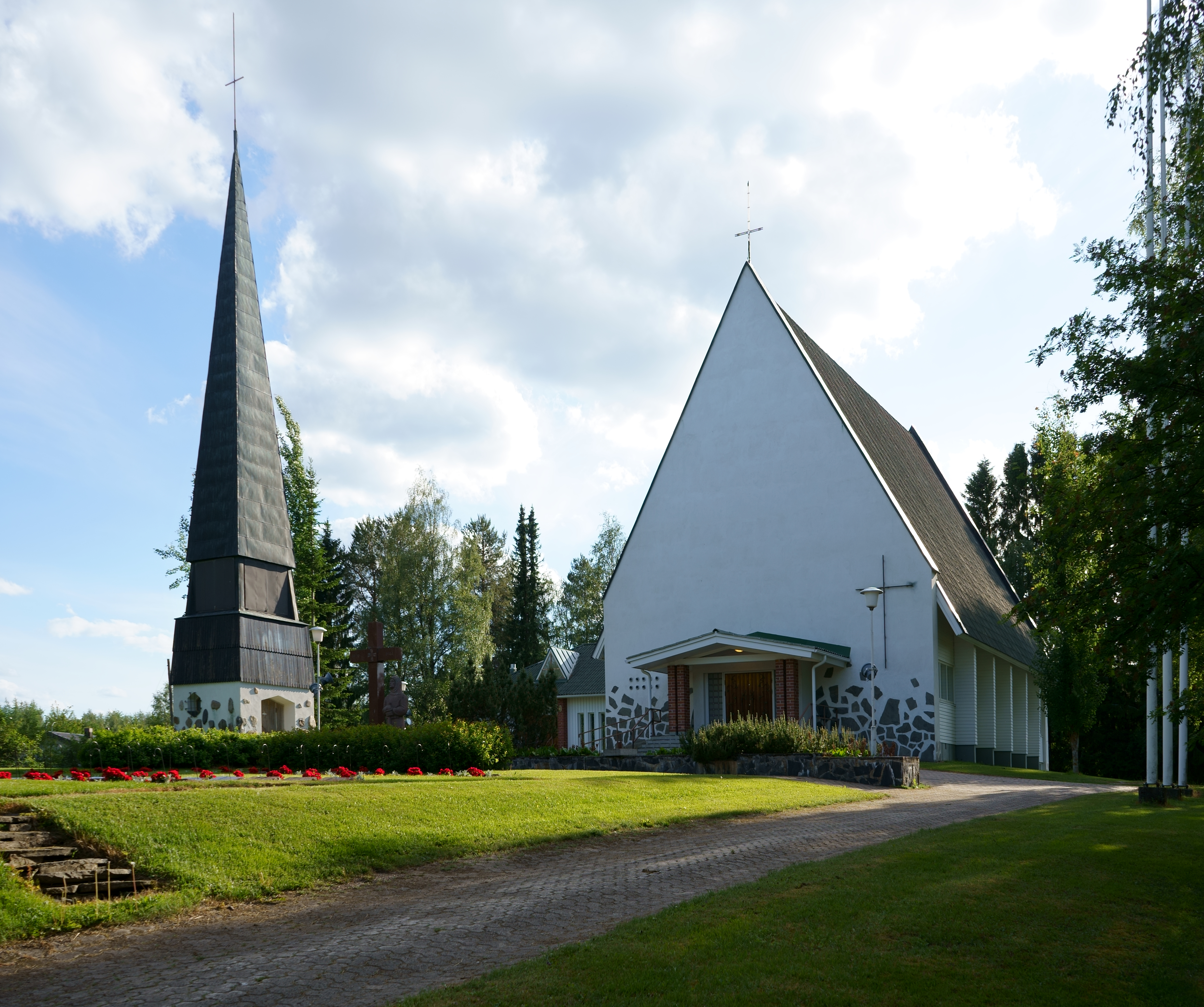
- Kyyjärvi church

- Coat of arms
- Nickname: Kyy York
- Location of Kyyjärvi in Finland
- Interactive map of Kyyjärvi
- Coordinates: 63°03′N 024°33.8′E
- Country: Finland
- Region: Central Finland
- Sub-region: Saarijärvi–Viitasaari sub-region
- Charter: 1929
- Seat: Nopola

Government
  - Municipal manager: Raisa Kinnunen

Area (2018-01-01)
  - Total: 469.61 km^{2} (181.32 sq mi)
  - Land: 448.22 km^{2} (173.06 sq mi)
  - Water: 21.39 km^{2} (8.26 sq mi)
  - Rank: 193rd largest in Finland

Population (2025-12-31)
  - Total: 1,129
  - Rank: 288th largest in Finland
  - Density: 2.52/km^{2} (6.5/sq mi)

Population by native language
  - Finnish: 97.3% (official)
  - Others: 2.7%

Population by age
  - 0 to 14: 15.4%
  - 15 to 64: 50.2%
  - 65 or older: 34.4%
- Time zone: UTC+02:00 (EET)
  - Summer (DST): UTC+03:00 (EEST)
- Website: www.kyyjarvi.fi

Kyyjärvi (Finnish pronunciation: [ˈkyːˌjærʋi]; lit. 'adder lake') is a municipality of Finland. It is located in the Central Finland region, about 120 kilometres (75 mi) northwest of Jyväskylä. The municipality has a population of 1,129 (31 December 2025) and covers an area of 469.61 square kilometres (181.32 sq mi) of which 21.39 km^{2} (8.26 sq mi) is water. The population density is 2.52 inhabitants per square kilometre (6.5/sq mi). The municipality is unilingually Finnish.

Neighbouring municipalities are Alajärvi, Karstula, Kivijärvi, Perho and Soini. The municipality centre is located on the shores of Lake Kyyjärvi. Little villages Hokkala, Koskimäki-Huhtala, Kumpula, Noposenaho, Hokkasenaho, Nurmijoki, Oikari, Peuralinna, Pölkki, Saunakylä and Vehkaperä are living mostly from primary production (farming and forestry). Due to its location on the crossroads of two main Finnish roads (Valtatie 13 and 16) the municipality has also a remarkable number of services and little companies compared to its size.

== Etymology ==
The origin of the name of Kyyjärvi is unknown but there are few theories of it. The first part of the name, "kyy", is Finnish word for adder (Vipera berus), a venomous snake. Järvi is Finnish word for lake. Adders can be found in Kyyjärvi, as everywhere in Finland. Another theory is that the first citizens moved to the area from the lake Kyyvesi and gave the name Kyyjärvi for their new home area and lake.

Among the locals, the municipality is playfully nicknamed "Kyy York", which is a reference to New York. Because of this, the municipality has adopted the following slogan: Kyy York – pieni kylä, suuri sydän ("small village, big heart").

== History ==
The area of modern Kyyjärvi was originally hunting grounds for Tavastian people. The village of Kyyjärvi was first mentioned in 1565 as Kÿierffuj, when it was a part of the parish of Rautalampi. In 1628, the parish of Laukaa, including Kyyjärvi, was split off from Rautalampi while in 1639, Kyyjärvi became a part of the new Saarijärvi parish established during this year.

In 1775, Kyyjärvi became one of the villages in the new chapel community of Karstula, which became its own parish in 1858. In 1913, it was decided that the territory of the Kyyjärvi school district should become its own municipality and parish. The municipality was established in 1929 while the parish was established in 1944.

=== Proposed Suomenselkä municipality ===
Kannonkoski, Karstula, Kivijärvi and Kyyjärvi planned to merge into the Suomenselkä municipality from January 1, 2022. Karstula, Kivijärvi and Kyyjärvi accepted the merger proposal, but Kannonkoski did not. After Kannonkoski left out of the planned merger, Kivijärvi also left out. The merger project of the remaining Karstula and Kyyjärvi failed at the Kyyjärvi municipal council meeting held on May 17, 2021, and the Ministry of Finance does not propose a forced merger either.

== Nature ==
There are all together 46 lakes in Kyyjärvi. Biggest lakes in Kyyjärvi are Lake Kyyjärvi, Heinuanjärvi and Kirvesjärvi.

== Transport ==
Kyyjärvi is served by Onnibus route Helsinki—Jyväskylä—Kokkola.

== Culture ==
=== Events ===
Every year in August, Kyyjärvi Camping organizes the Nopola Pop Festival, which features many Finnish music artists.

=== Food ===
In the 1980s, the local traditional dishes of Kyyjärvi were ryynirokka, a meat soup seasoned with pearled barley, and a blodpalt called lepikäs.

== Notable individuals ==
- Aila Paloniemi, Member of the Parliament of Finland

== Twin towns ==
- Sorsele, Sweden
- Võnnu Parish, Estonia
