= Kurista, Tartu County =

Village in Estonia

Kurista
- village
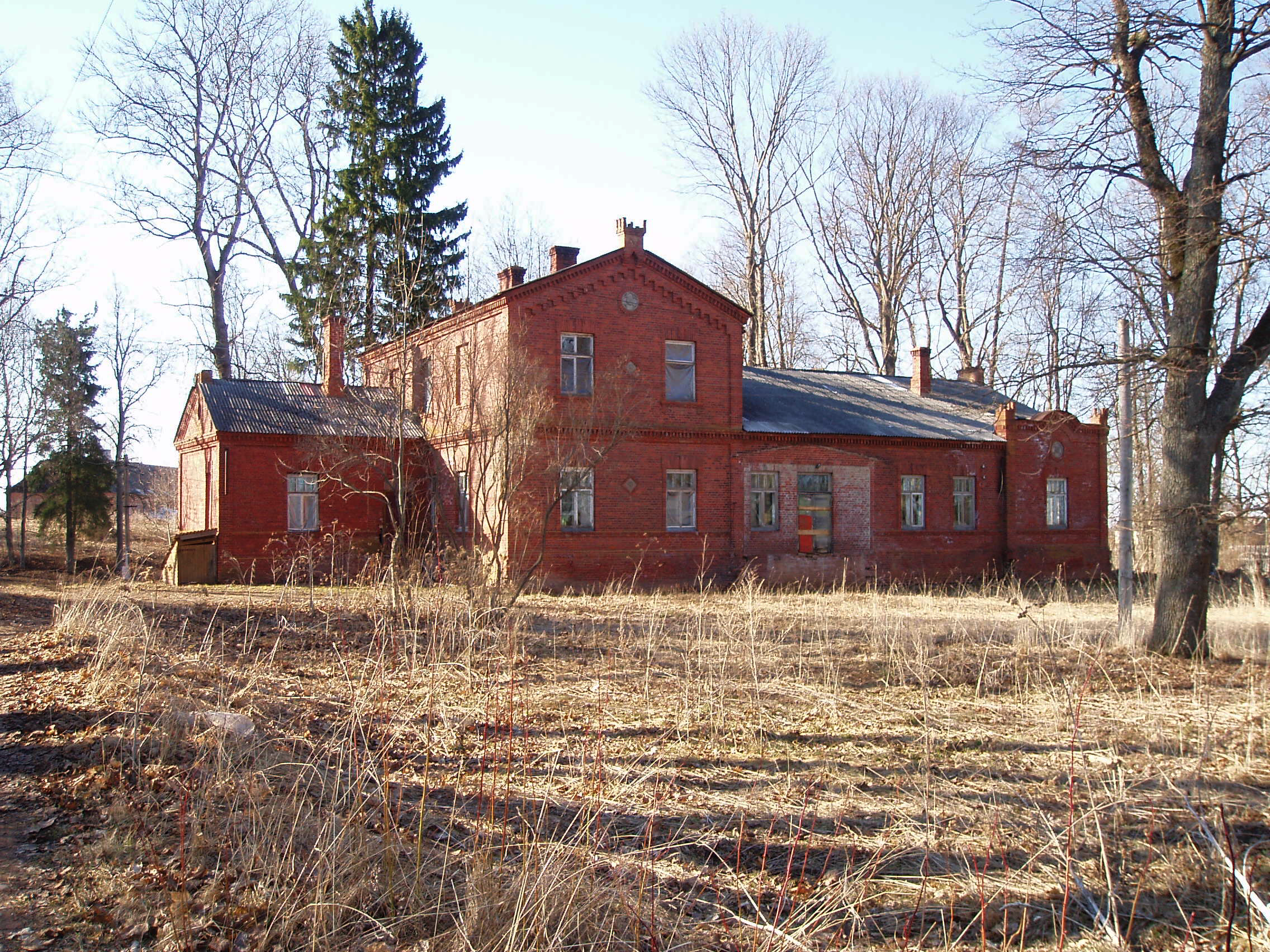
- Kurista Manor

- Location in Estonia
- Coordinates: 58°15′36″N 27°00′14″E
- Country: Estonia
- County: Tartu County
- Municipality: Kastre Parish

Population (01.01.2000)
  - Total: 135

Kurista is a village in Kastre Parish, Tartu County, Estonia. It is located just southwest of Võnnu. The city of Tartu is located about 21 km (13 mi) northwest. In 2000 Kurista had a population of 135. Prior to the administrative reform of Estonian local governments in 2017, the village belonged to Võnnu Parish.

Kurista Manor (Kurrista) was established after the Great Northern War by detaching the land from Ahja Manor. Until 1902 it belonged to the Villebois. The small flush joint eclectic main building was constructed of bricks in the second half of the 19th century. A large park is surrounding the manorhouse. In the western end of the park there's the family cemetery of de Villebois'.
