= Finnish national road 13 =

Road in Finland

National Road 13
- Valtatie 13 (Finnish); Riksväg 13 (Swedish)
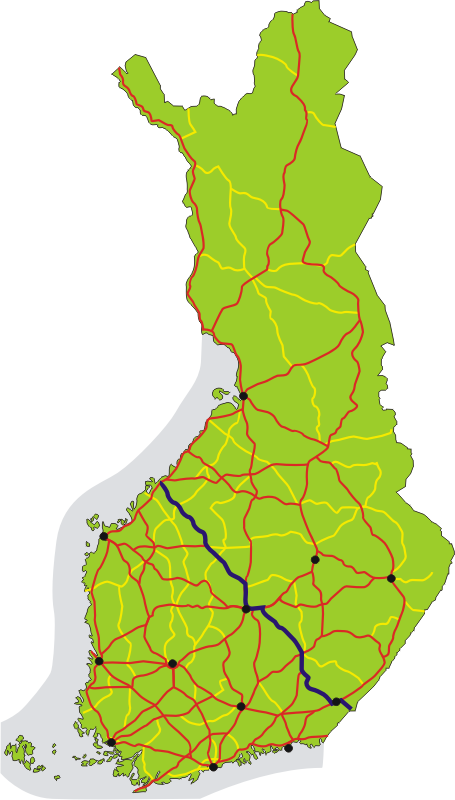

Route information
- Maintained by the Finnish Road Administration
- Length: 499 km (310 mi)
- Existed: 1938–present

Major junctions
- From: Kokkola
- To: Lappeenranta

Location
- Country: Finland
- Major cities: Kokkola, Kronoby, Kaustinen, Veteli, Perho, Kyyjärvi, Karstula, Saarijärvi, Äänekoski, Uurainen, Laukaa, Jyväskylä, Toivakka, Kangasniemi, Mikkeli, Savitaipale, Lemi, Taipalsaari and Lappeenranta.

Highway system
- Highways in Finland
← Vt 12	→ Vt 14

The Finnish national road 13 (Finnish: Valtatie 13, Swedish: Riksväg 13) is a highway in Finland. The highway connects the communities of Kokkola and Lappeenranta via Jyväskylä. From Nuijamaa, which is now part of Lappeenranta, the road continues after the Russian border all the way to Vyborg.

== History ==
In the 1938 numbering system, national road 13 ran from Vyborg (then Viipuri) to Kokkola via Mikkeli and Jyväskylä. It was one of three highways that fanned out from Vyborg. When Karelia was ceded to the Soviet Union after WWII, the route was cut off at Lappeenranta.

The road was built between the 1950s and 1980s to mainly follow the 1938 routing. The most significant differences are as follows:

- The route between Jyväskylä and Saarijärvi originally ran through Uurainen along current roads 630 and 6304.
- The section between Kangasniemi and Jyväskylä originally ran through Toivakka along current roads 4421 and 618 to-then main road 59 (now national road 4).
- As late as 1933, the route between Mikkeli and Jyväskylä ran through Leivonmäki along current regional road 431.
- Between Suomenniemi and Savitaipale, the route originally ran on the east side of Lake Kuolimo via Partakoski along current regional road 409. Main road 13 now runs on the west side of the lake.

Regional road 392 between Lauritsala and Nuijamaa in Lappeenranta was renumbered as a portion of national road 13 in the 1990s following the collapse of the Soviet Union, when national road 13 returned to being the main road leading to Vyborg.
