= Pääjärvi (Karstula) =

Lake in Karstula, Finland

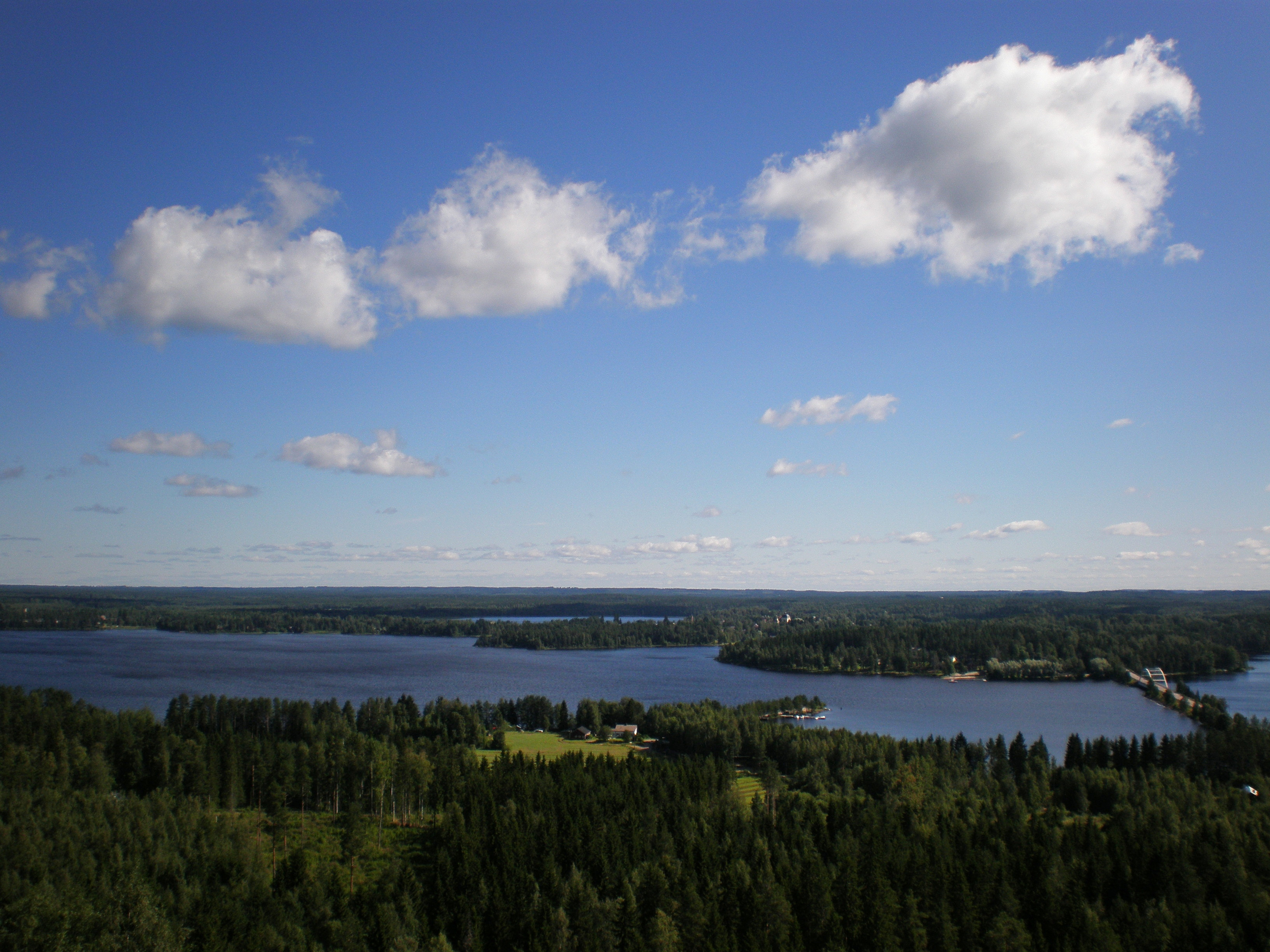

- Location within Finland
- Coordinates: 62°53′N 24°44′E
- Lake type: Natural
- Catchment area: Kymijoki
- Basin countries: Finland
- Surface area: 29.5 km^{2} (11.4 sq mi)
- Average depth: 3.81 m (12.5 ft)
- Max. depth: 14.9 m (49 ft)
- Water volume: 0.112 km^{3} (0.027 cu mi)
- Surface elevation: 144.4 m (474 ft)
- Islands: Kirkkosaari, Vuohisaari, Niittysaari, Männikkösaari

Pääjärvi is a medium-sized lake of Finland. It belongs to the Kymijoki main catchment area. It is located in Karstula in the region of Keski-Suomi. All named islands inside are Kirkkosaari, Vuohisaari, Unikonsaari, Niittysaari, Karjasaari, Hermanninsaari, Sikosaari, Korpisaari, Kivikonsaari, Parkinluoto, Kertosaari, Ellunsaari, Tuomaansaari, Taikinasaari, Nuttura and Männikkösaari.

The north part of the lake belongs to the Natura 2000 environment protection program (number FI0900141).

== See also ==
- List of lakes in Finland
