= Kannu, Võru County =

Village in Estonia

Kannu
- village
- Location in Estonia
- Coordinates: 57°54′20″N 27°07′44″E
- Country: Estonia
- County: Võru County
- Municipality: Võru Parish

Government
  - Village elder: Enn Järvpõld

Area
  - Total: 4.4 km^{2} (1.7 sq mi)

Population
  - Total: 29
  - Density: 6.6/km^{2} (17/sq mi)

Kannu is a village in Võru Parish, Võru County in southeastern Estonia. It is located about 10 km (6 mi) northeast of the town of Võru. Kannu has a population of 29 and an area of 4.4 km².

The village has a bus stop and a lake called Jõrõssuu järv.
