= Ahijärv (Ahunapalu) =

Lake in Tartu County, Estonia

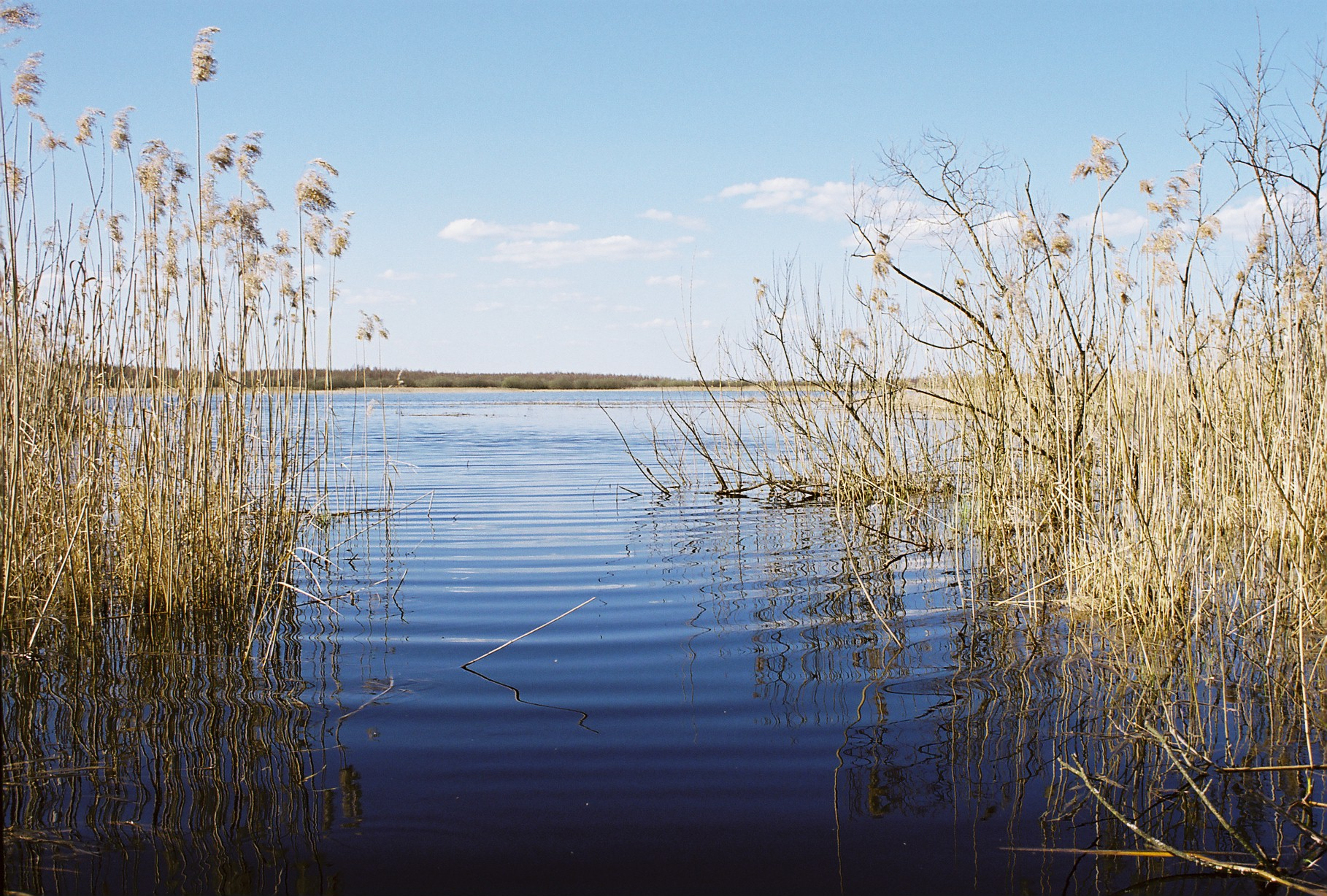

- Location within Estonia
- Location: Kastre Parish, Tartu County, Estonia
- Coordinates: 58.303612°N 27.175556°E
- Basin countries: Estonia
- Max. length: 1,530 meters (5,020 ft)
- Surface area: 32.5 hectares (80 acres)
- Average depth: 1.5 meters (4 ft 11 in)
- Max. depth: 2.0 meters (6 ft 7 in)
- Shore length^{1}: 4,520 meters (14,830 ft)
- Surface elevation: 31.0 meters (101.7 ft)
- Islands: 1
- ^{1} Shore length is not a well-defined measure.

Ahijärv (also known as Lääniste Ahijärv) is a lake in Estonia. It is located in the village of Ahunapalu in Kastre Parish, Tartu County, Estonia.

== Physical description ==
The lake has an area of 32.5 hectares (80 acres), and it has an island with an area of 0.04 hectares (0.099 acres). The lake has an average depth of 1.5 meters (4 ft 11 in) and a maximum depth of 2.0 meters (6 ft 7 in). It is 1,530 meters (5,020 ft) long, and its shoreline measures 4,520 meters (14,830 ft).

== See also ==
- List of lakes of Estonia
