= Lake Kyyjärvi =

Lake in Finland

- Location within Finland
- Location: Finland
- Coordinates: 63.05°N 24.59°E
- Primary outflows: Oikarinjoki
- Basin countries: Finland
- Max. length: 11.5 km (7.1 mi)
- Max. width: 3.5 km (2.2 mi)
- Surface area: 16.34 km^{2} (6.31 sq mi)
- Average depth: 1.6 m (5.2 ft)
- Max. depth: 15.7 m (52 ft)
- Water volume: 25,816.73 m^{3} (911,709 cu ft)
- Residence time: 77 days
- Shore length^{1}: 51.4 km (31.9 mi)
- Surface elevation: 150.5 m (494 ft)
- Frozen: January - April
- Islands: 31 islands
- Settlements: Kyyjärvi
- ^{1} Shore length is not a well-defined measure.

Lake Kyyjärvi is a medium-sized lake in Kyyjärvi municipality, Finland. It is a starting point of the Saarijärvi Whitewater Route, a continuous watercourse in Central Finland.

== See also ==
- List of lakes in Finland
