= Kurista, Jõgeva County =

Village in Estonia

Coordinates: 58°44′N 26°19′E

Kurista
- Village
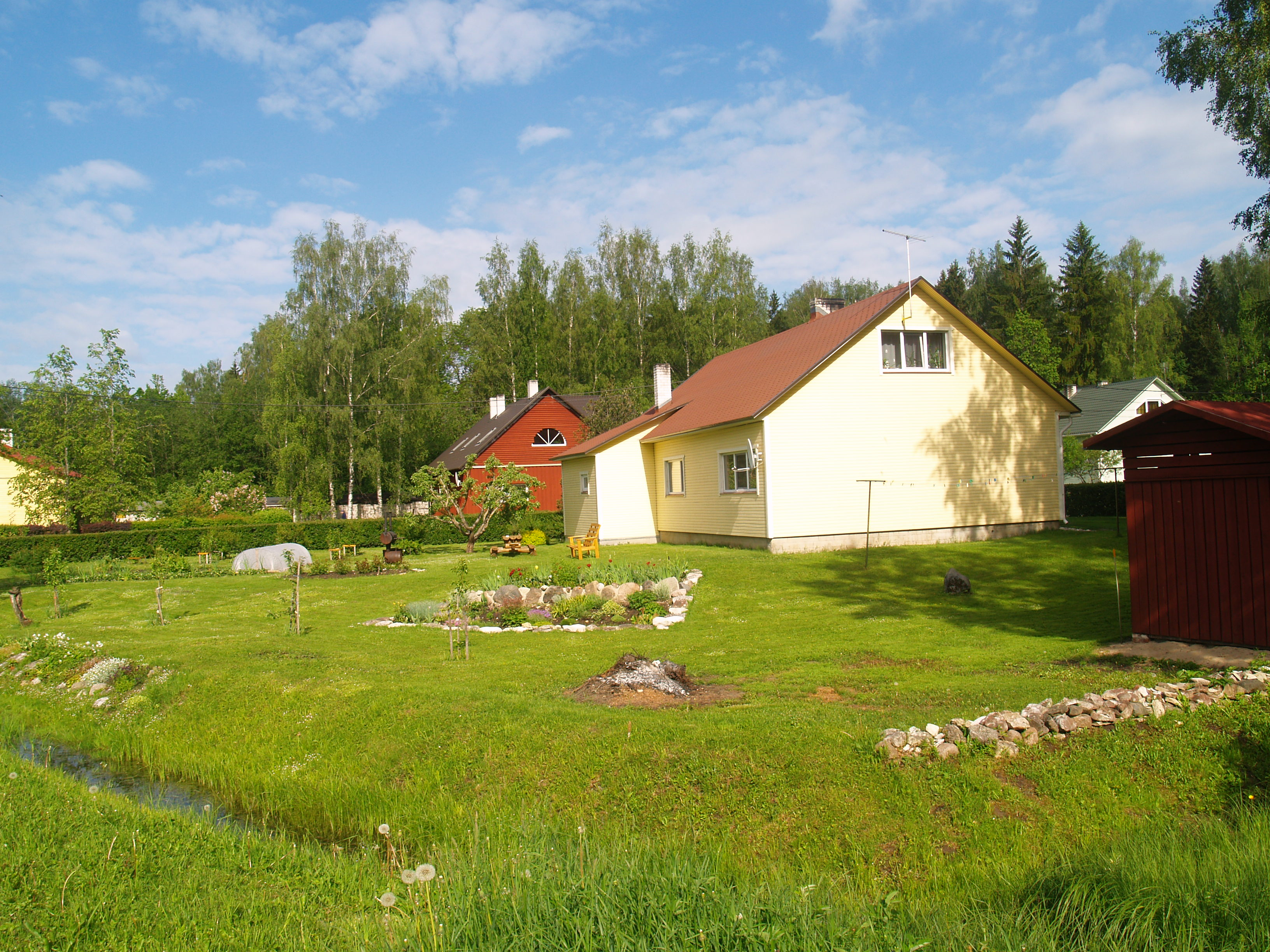
- Houses in Kurista
- Interactive map of Kurista
- Country: Estonia
- County: Jõgeva County
- Parish: Jõgeva Parish
- Time zone: UTC+2 (EET)
  - Summer (DST): UTC+3 (EEST)

Kurista (German: Kurrista) is a village in Jõgeva Parish, Jõgeva County in eastern Estonia.
