= Kannu, Tartu County =

Village in Estonia

Kannu
- village
- Location in Estonia
- Coordinates: 58°18′53″N 27°02′50″E
- Country: Estonia
- County: Tartu County
- Municipality: Kastre Parish

Population (01.01.2000)
  - Total: 18

Kannu is a village in Kastre Parish, Tartu County, Estonia. It is located just north of Võnnu. The city of Tartu is located about 20 km (12 mi) northwest. In 2000 Kannu had a population of 18.
