= Võnnu, Lääne County =

Village in Estonia

Coordinates: 58°54′N 23°41′E

Võnnu
- Village
- Interactive map of Võnnu
- Country: Estonia
- County: Lääne County
- Municipality: Haapsalu
- Time zone: UTC+2 (EET)
  - Summer (DST): UTC+3 (EEST)

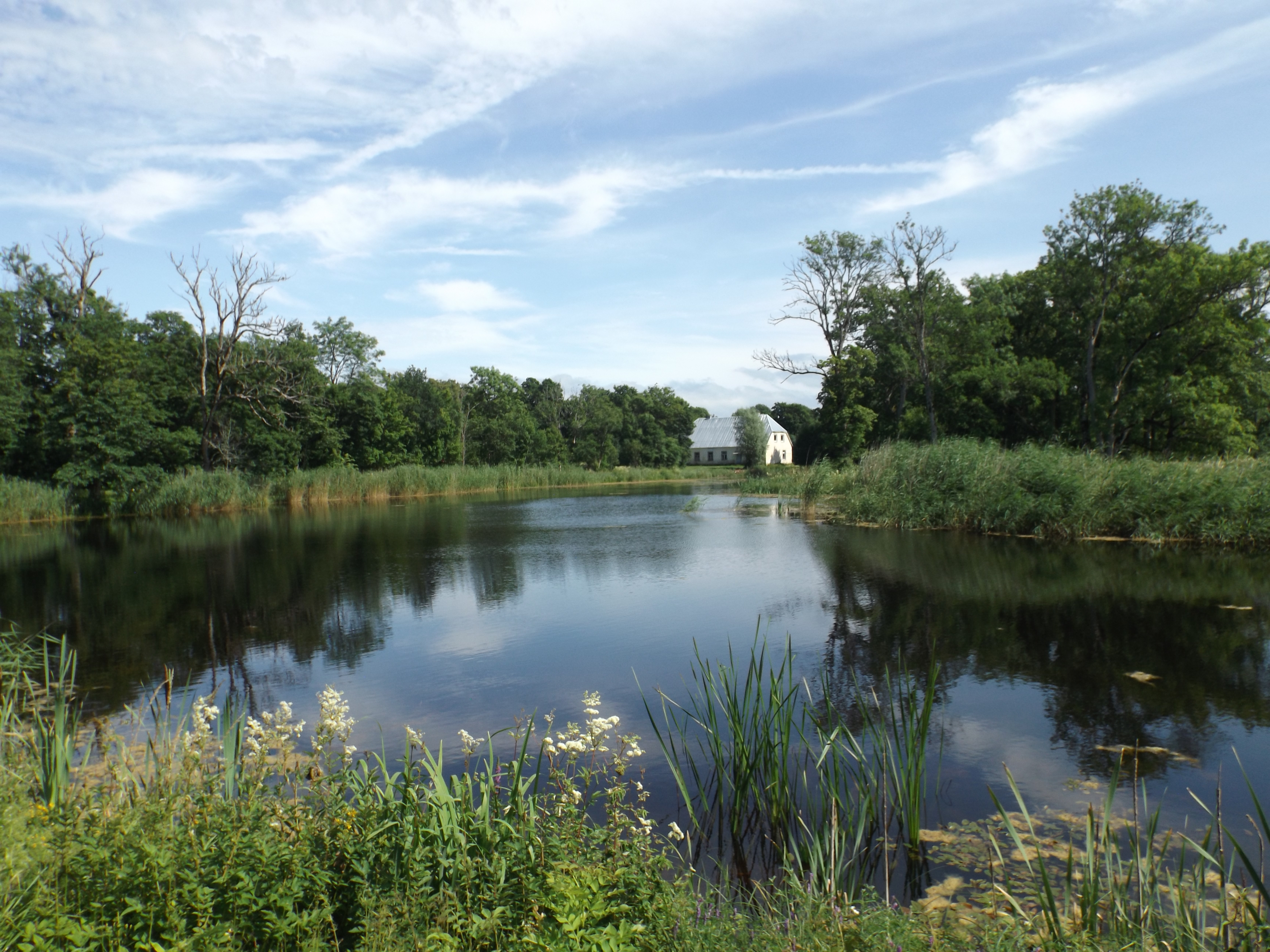
Võnnu pond

Võnnu (German: Wenden) is a village in Haapsalu municipality, Lääne County, in western Estonia. Prior to the 2017 administrative reform of local governments, it was located in Ridala Parish.

Composer Cyrillus Kreek was born in Võnnu in 1889.
