= Ähijärv =

Lake in Estonia

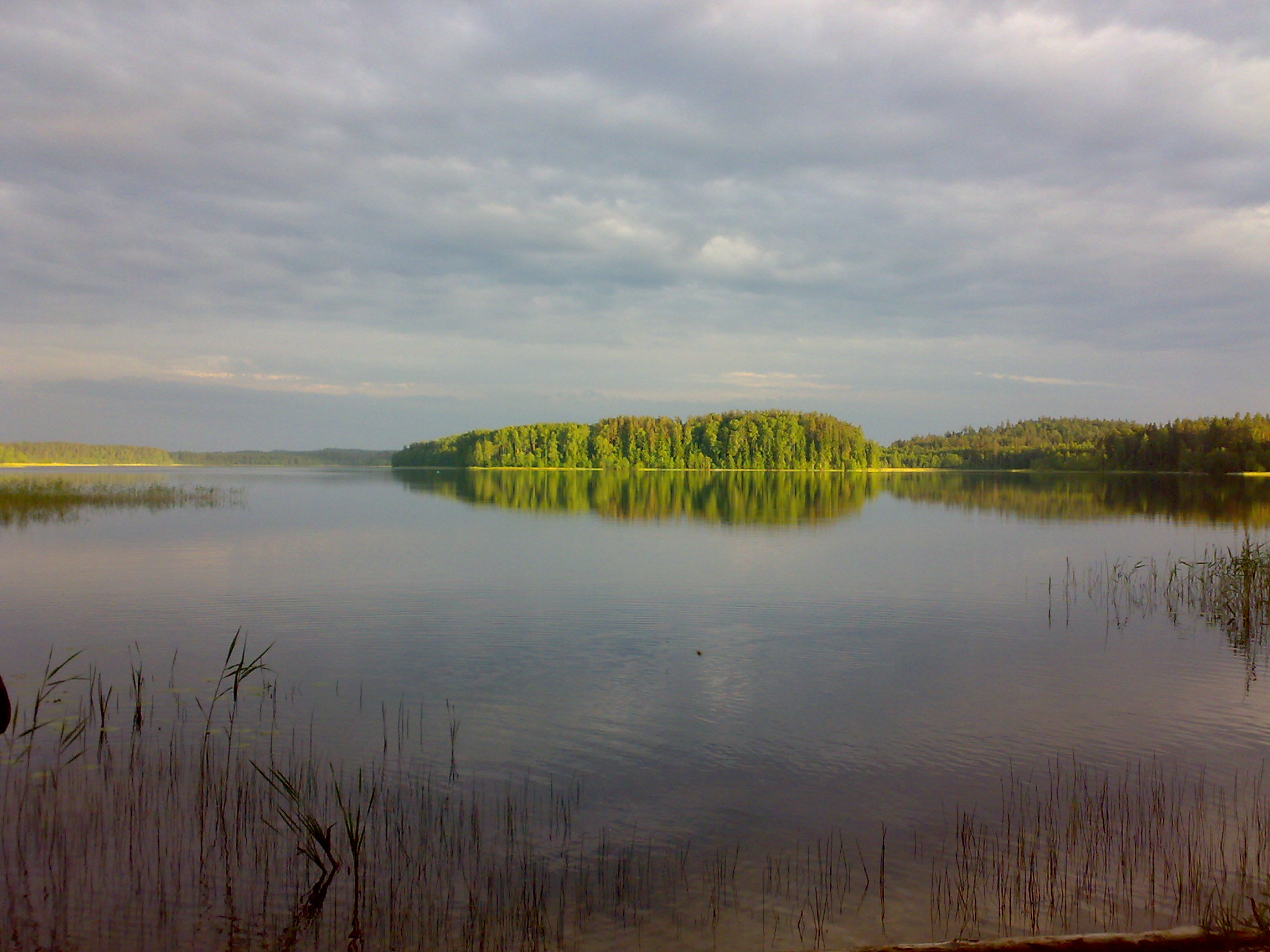

- Location within Estonia
- Coordinates: 57.71108°N 26.4970°E
- Basin countries: Estonia
- Max. length: 2,730 meters (8,960 ft)
- Surface area: 182.9 hectares (452 acres)
- Average depth: 3.9 meters (13 ft)
- Max. depth: 6.3 meters (21 ft)
- Water volume: 7,402,000 cubic meters (261,400,000 cu ft)
- Shore length^{1}: 9,910 meters (32,510 ft)
- Surface elevation: 77.6 meters (255 ft)
- Islands: 2
- ^{1} Shore length is not a well-defined measure.

Ähijärv (also known as Ahijärv) is a lake in Estonia. It is part of the village of Ähijärve in Antsla Parish, Võru County.

== Physical description ==
The lake has an area of 182.9 hectares (452 acres), and it has two islands with a combined area of 0.3 hectares (0.74 acres). The lake has an average depth of 3.9 meters (13 ft) and a maximum depth of 6.3 meters (21 ft). It is 2,730 meters (8,960 ft) long, and its shoreline measures 9,910 meters (32,510 ft). It has a volume of 7,402,000 cubic meters (261,400,000 cu ft).

== See also ==
- List of lakes of Estonia
