= Terikeste =

Village in Estonia

- Village
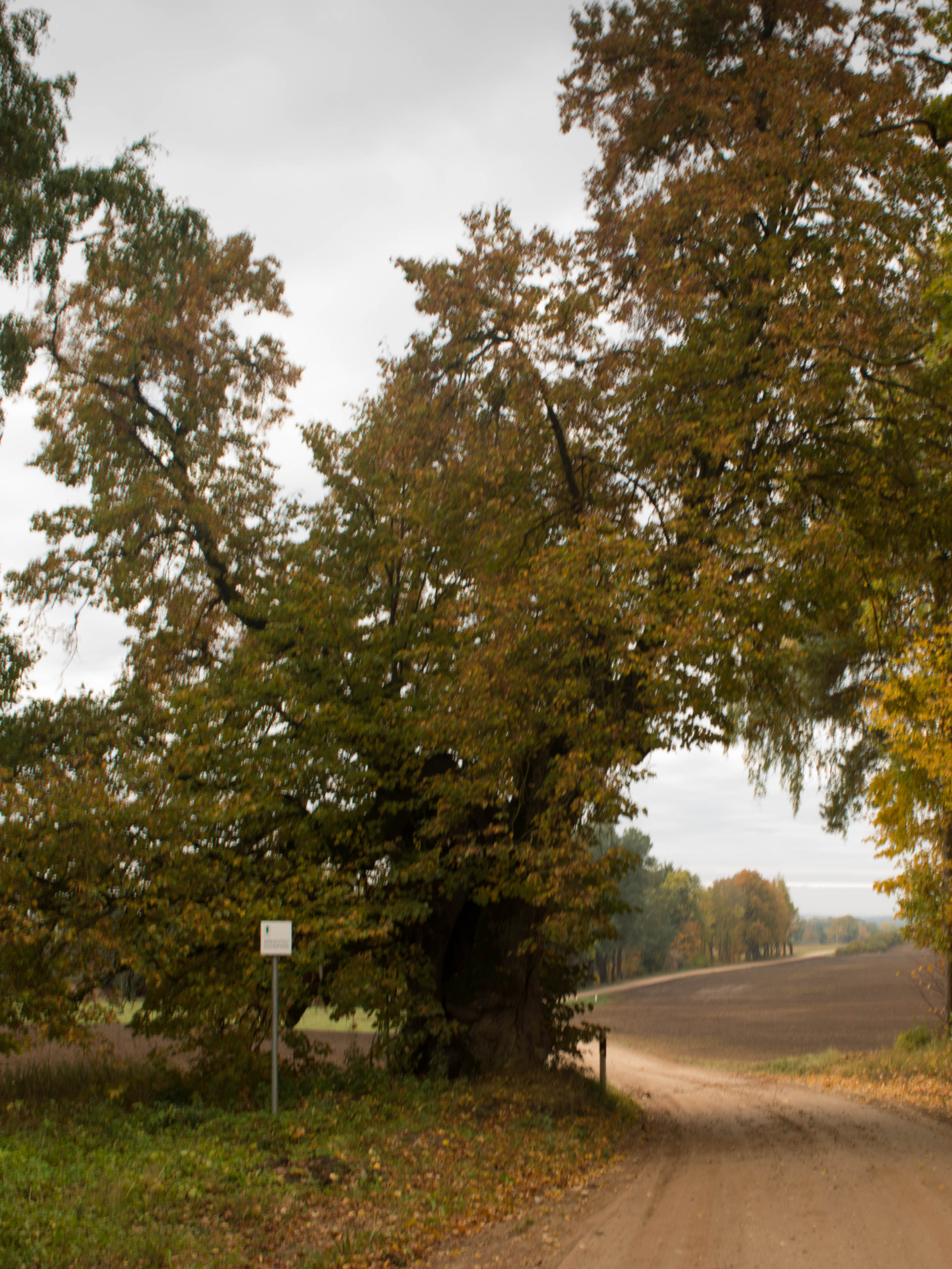

- Location within Estonia
- Coordinates: 58.301944444444°N 27.107777777778°E
- Country: Estonia
- County: Tartu County
- Parish: Kastre Parish
- Time zone: UTC+2 (EET)
  - Summer (DST): UTC+3 (EEST)

Terikeste is a village in Kastre Parish, Tartu County in Estonia.
