= Souvarit =

Finnish schlager band

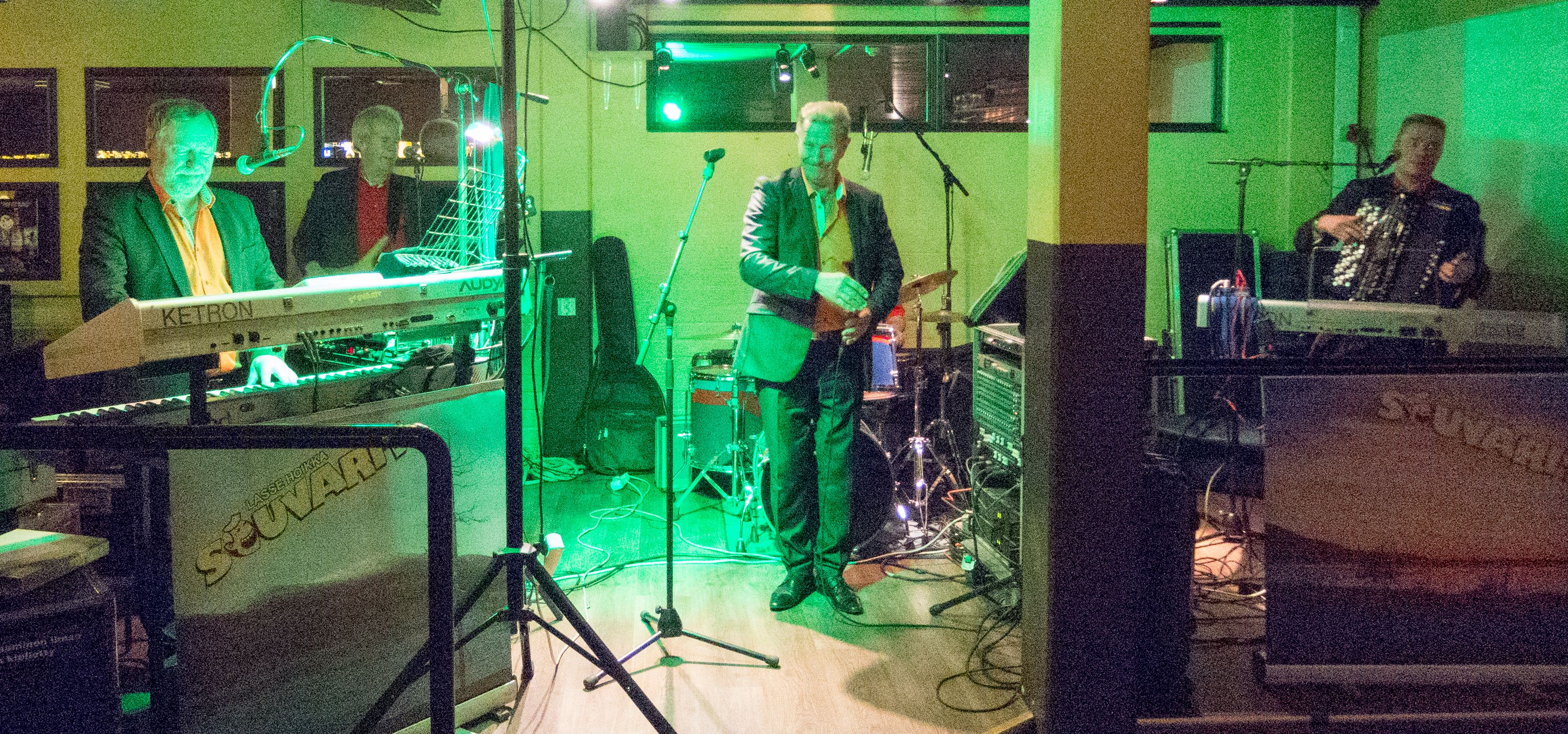
Souvarit

Souvarit is a Finnish song and dance music ensemble founded in 1978, a schlager pop band that plays mainly Lapland-themed dance music.

The founding members included Lasse Hoikka on lead vocals, Tapani Peura and Juha Salmivuori. It has seen many line-up changes since then, but always highlighted the vocals of its founding member.

== Lasse Hoikka ==
Lasse Hoikka (born Tervola), is a famous Finnish singer and musician and lead singer of Souvarit since 1978. Hoikka has also developed a solo career releasing albums of his own.

== Members ==
The set-up of Souvarit has varied over time. Members were:

Vocals

- Lasse Hoikka (1978–)

Keyboards

- Jouni Ruokamo (1990–)

Accordion

- Tapani Peura (1978–1979)
- Jorma Kyrö (1979–1983)
- Martti Honkanen (1983–1986)
- Jukka Lampela (1986–2013)
- Mikko Keskimaunu (2014–2019)
- Marko Jolkkonen (2019–)

Bass

- Juha Salmivuori (1978–1980)
- Pauli Ruuskanen (1980–1983, 2015–)
- Juha Torvinen (1983–1985)
- Jorma Hietala (1985–2015)

Drums

- Lasse Hoikka (1978–2011)
- Timo Salmela (2011–2017)
- Pasi Alakurtti (2017–)

== Discography ==
=== Souvarit ===
(peak position in Finnish charts wherever applicable)

- 1980: Lapinkävijän laulut
- 1982: Kotijärvi
- 1983: Jätkän oma kulta
- 1984: Nuoruuden tie
- 1998: Kultamailla
- 1989: Parhaat
- 1990: Tukkipojat
- 1990: Suosituimmat Souvarit
- 1990: Neljän tuulen tie
- 1991: Laulajan tie
- 1993: Lapin luonto luo outoa taikaa...
- 1993: Sinisenä lintuna haluaisin lentää
- 1994: Hallayön kukka
- 1995: Tuntureiden tunnelmaa
- 1995: Lapin Kaipuu
- 1996: Kultakuume
- 1998: Lapin luonto luo outoa taikaa
- 1998: Tähtiyö ja Kuutamo
- 1999: Rakkaus Lappiin - 20-vuotis juhlalevy!
- 2000: Tunturituuli
- 2001: Kuukkelin suosituimmat
- 2001: Amore Mio (FIN #33)
- 2003: Souvarit Tunnelmoiden
- 2004: 25-vuotis juhlalevy (FIN #35)
- 2005: Kaupunki kahden virran
- 2007: Pohjolan yö
- 2008: 30-vuotis juhlalevy
- 2009: Kultamaan lauluja
- 2009: Toivotuimmat joululaulut
- 2010: Leksan muistosoitot

Various rereleases and compilations

- 1991: Parhaat (plus 6 new tracks)
- 1997: 20 suosikkia - Jätkän oma kulta
- 1997: Neljän tuulen tie (plus 6 new + 6 new tracks)
- 1997: Tukkipojat (plus 6 new tracks)
- 2002: 10 uutta & 10 suosituinta
- 2003: Suosituimmat Souvarit 80-luvulta
- 2004: 40 tuttua & toivotuinta
- 2007: 40 tuttua & toivotuinta 2
- 2007: 40 unohtumatonta laulua

Joint albums

- 2003: Souvarit ja Lasse Hoikka parhaat 80-luvulta
- 2004: Souvarit ja Lasse Hoikka sekä Ilpo Karisen Orkesteri
- 2010: Lasse Hoikka ja Rautukopla

=== Lasse Hoikka (solo) ===
(peak position in Finnish charts wherever applicable)

- 2014: Taas kutsuu tie (FIN #26)
- 2007: Kun aika on (FIN #39)
- 2006: Maankiertäjät (FIN #10)
