= Ahunapalu =

Village in Estonia

- Village
- Location within Estonia
- Coordinates: 58.325°N 27.285555555556°E
- Country: Estonia
- County: Tartu County
- Parish: Kastre Parish
- Time zone: UTC+2 (EET)
  - Summer (DST): UTC+3 (EEST)

Ahunapalu is a village in Kastre Parish, Tartu County in Estonia.
