= Carl Eduard Körber =

Baltic German clergyman and writer

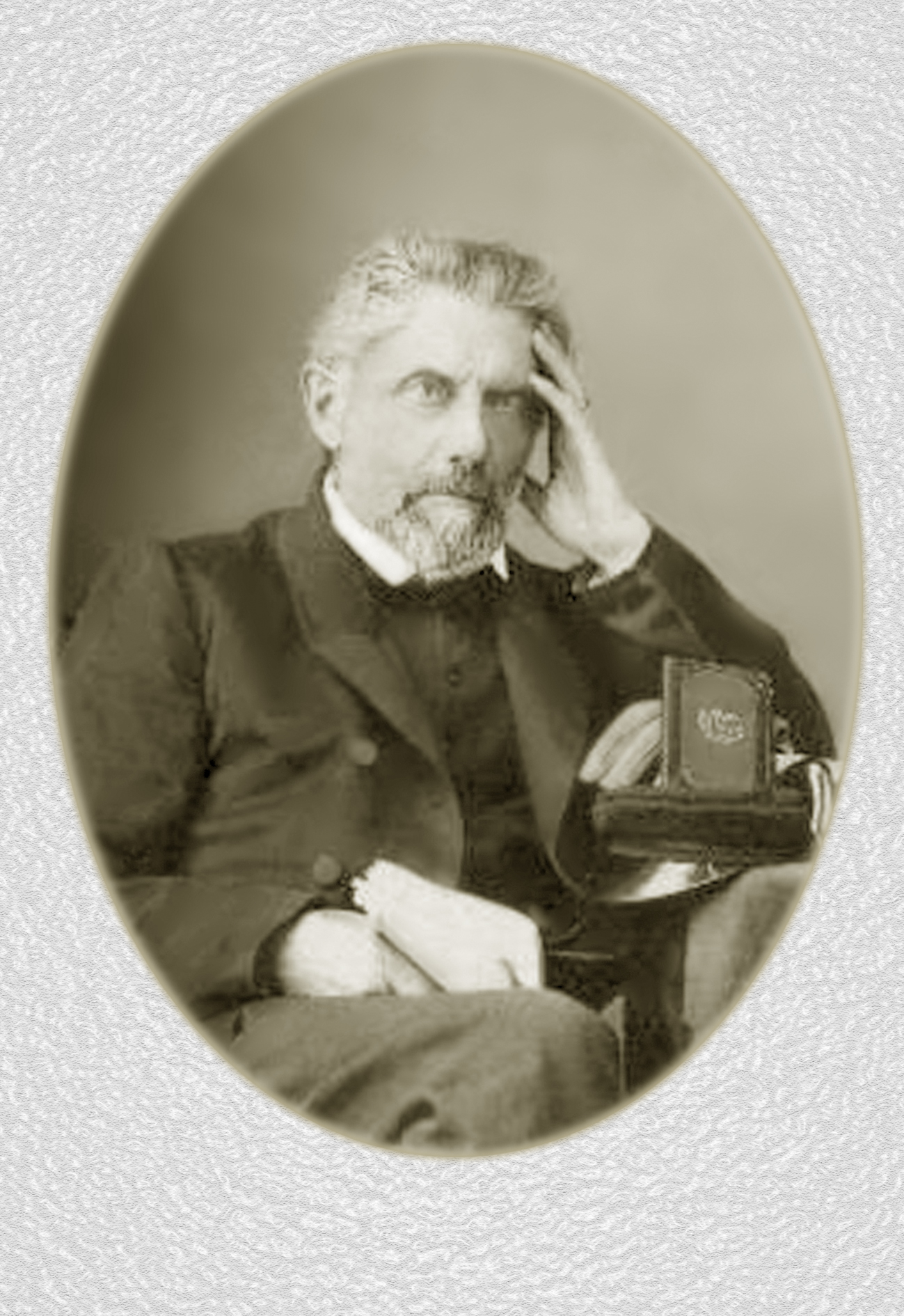
Carl Eduard Körber

Carl Eduard Anton Körber (4 June 1802 Tartu County – 4 May 1883) was an Estonian pastor of Baltic German ancestry and writer.

From 1820 to 1823 he studied theology at Imperial University of Dorpat. From 1841 to 1859 he was a pastor of Vändra Congregation. He subsequently graduated from the Imperial University of Dorpat in 1834, and briefly became a private tutor before training to become a pastor two years afterwards. Following his retirement he moved to Tartu, served as the Tallorahwa Postimees newspaper editor and returned as a private tutor to receive a salary.

He was a member of Learned Estonian Society.

== Works ==
In addition to his religious writings, Körber was a prolific contributor to Estonian-language educational and literary materials. He authored several primers, textbooks, and dictionaries, and translated a number of children's books to support early education and literacy in Estonia.

- Joosepi elloramat (1850) – A religious biography intended for spiritual instruction.
- Lomisse ramat (1851) – A popular primer used in elementary education.
- Koli-ramat series (1854) – A set of school textbooks covering various subjects, widely used in Estonian schools.
