= Võnnu =

Borough in Estonia

- Small borough
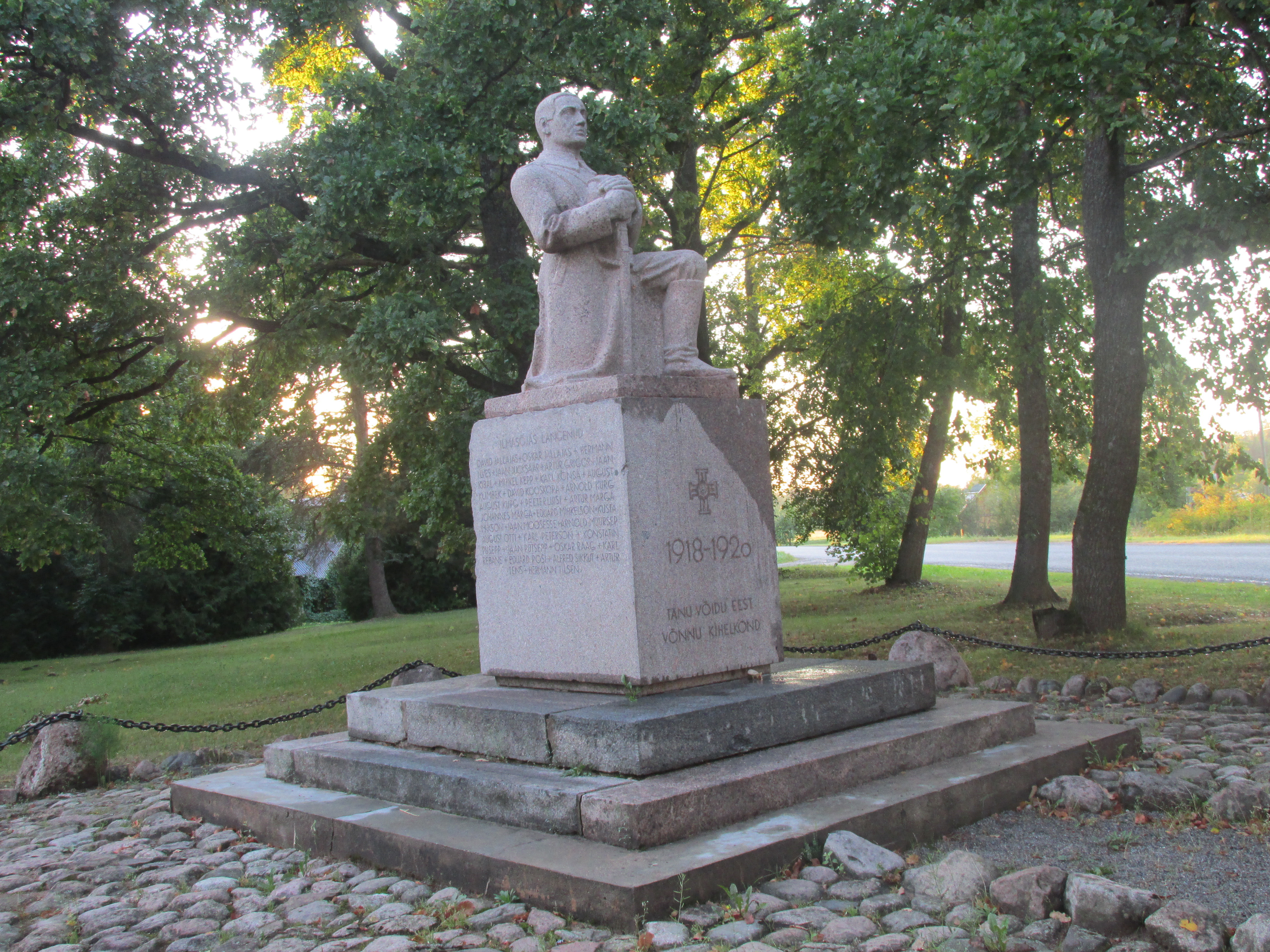
- Estonian War of Independence memorial in Võnnu

- Location in Estonia
- Coordinates: 58°16′57″N 27°03′01″E
- Country: Estonia
- County: Tartu County
- Municipality: Kastre Parish
- First mentioned: 1341

Population (2011 Census)
  - Total: 552

Võnnu (German: Wenden) is a small borough (Estonian: alevik) in Tartu County, in Kastre Parish, Estonia. It is located about 21 km (13 mi) southeast of the city of Tartu. Võnnu has a population of 552 (2011).

Võnnu was the administrative centre of Võnnu Parish.

== Name ==
Võnnu was attested in historical sources as Wenden in 1582, Wendehof in 1630, Wendo Kÿlla in 1638, and Wendohof in 1740. There are several hypotheses about the origin of the name Võnnu. The linguist Lauri Kettunen compared the name to võnnuvõõras 'unfamiliar, unknown'. The linguist Julius Mägiste compared the name to Finnish vieno 'gentle, quiet (also referring to running water)', relating it to a swampy place. This view was also endorsed by the folklorist Matthias Johann Eisen.

== Notable sites ==
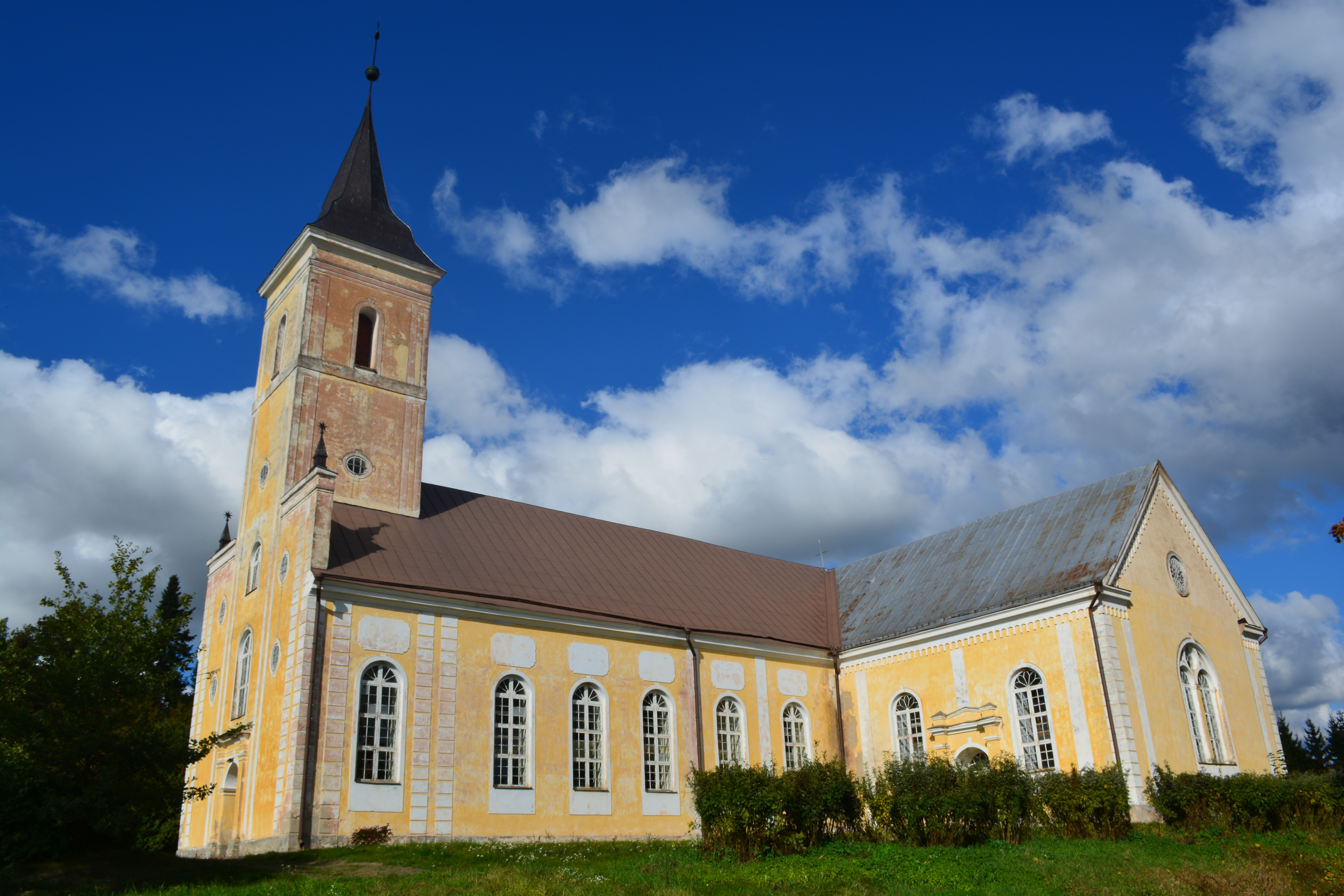
Võnnu Church

Saint James's Church of the Estonian Evangelical Lutheran Church (originally constructed, 1232–1236) has been rebuilt several times, and is one of the largest churches in the Estonian countryside.

== Notable people ==
- Carl Eduard Körber (1802–1883), pastor and writer
- Martin Körber (1817–1893), pastor, composer, writer and choir leader
- Gustav Suits (1883–1956), poet; was born in Võnnu
