= Joni (given name) =

Joni is a unisex given name. Notable people with the name include:

- Joni Adamson, American literary theorist
- Joni Albrecht, American politician
- Joni Aho (born 1986), Finnish football right-back
- Joni Anwar (born 1981), Thai singer and actor
- Joni Ayton-Kent, British actress
- Joni Brandão (born 1989), Portuguese cyclist
- Joni Cotten (born 1953), American curler
- Joni Craighead, American politician
- Joni Cutler, American politician
- Joni Eareckson Tada (born 1949), American author and Christian ministry founder
- Joni Evans, American book publisher
- Joni Ernst (born 1970), American senator from Iowa
- Joni Fuller, English musician
- Joni Van Ryck De Groot (born 1955), Jamaican tennis player
- Joni Gutierrez, American politician
- Joni Harms, American country music singer-songwriter
- Joni Haverinen (born 1987), Finnish professional ice hockey player
- Joni Hendrawan, Indonesian terrorist
- Joni Henson, Canadian operatic soprano
- Joni Huntley (born 1956), American high jumper
- Joni Ikonen (born 1999), Finnish ice hockey forward
- Joni Isomäki (born 1985), Finnish ice hockey player
- Joni Jaako (born 1986), Swedish sprinter
- Joni James (1930-2022), American singer of traditional pop music
- Joni Jenkins, American politician
- Joni T. Johnson (1934–1988), American painter
- Joni E. Johnston, American psychologist, investigator, and author
- Joni Karjalainen (born 1991), Finnish ice hockey forward
- Joni Kauko (born 1990), Finnish football midfielder
- Joni Khetsuriani (born 1998), Georgian Greco-Roman wrestler
- Joni Korhonen (born 1987), Finnish football winger
- Joni Lamb (died 2026), American television evangelist
- Joni Lee, American country music singer
- Joni Lehto (born 1970), ice hockey defenceman
- Joni Lehtonen, Finnish football manager
- Joni Liljeblad (born 1989), Finnish ice hockey player
- Joni Lius (born 1971), Finnish ice hockey center
- Joni Lovenduski, professor at the University of London
- Joni Mabe, American book artist
- Joni Madraiwiwi (1957–2016), Fijian lawyer
- Joni Madraiwiwi I, Fijian chief
- Joni Mäkelä (born 1993), Finnish football right winger
- Joni Mäki (born 1995), Finnish cross-country skier
- Joni Mataitini, Fijian civil servant
- Joni Mitchell (born 1943), Canadian musician, songwriter, and painter
- Joni Montiel (born 1998), Spanish footballer
- Joni Myllykoski (born 1984), Finnish ice hockey player
- Joni Nikko (born 1994), Finnish ice hockey left wing
- Joni Nissinen (born 1991), Finnish footballer
- Joni Nyman (born 1962), Finnish boxer
- Joni Ortio (born 1991), Finnish ice hockey goaltender
- Joni Pitkänen (born 1983), Finnish hockey player
- Joni Pirtskhalaishvili, Georgian lieutenant-general
- Joni Puurula (born 1982), Finnish ice hockey goaltender
- Joni Remesaho (born 1993), Finnish football left winger
- Joni Robbins (born Joan Eva Rothman), American voice actress
- Joni L. Rutter, American geneticist
- Joni Ruuskanen (born 1988), Finnish football coach
- Joni Savaste (born 2004), Finnish mountain biker
- Joni Savimäki (born 1991), Finnish volleyball player
- Joni Seinelä (born 1993), Finnish ice hockey right wing
- Joni Sledge (1956–2017), American singer-songwriter
- Joni Sternbach, American photographer
- Joni Taylor (born 1979), American basketball coach
- Joni Töykkälä (born 1984), Finnish ice hockey assistant coach and former ice hockey forward
- Joni Tuominen (born 1982), Finnish ice hockey defenceman
- Joni Turunen (born 1976), Finnish boxer
- Joni Tuulola (born 1996), Finnish ice hockey defenceman
- Joni Wallis, American cognitive neurophysiologist
- Joni Wiman (born 1993), Finnish rallycross driver
- Joni Yli-Torkko (born 1982), Finnish ice hockey forward
- Joni A. Yoswein (born 1955), American politician
- Joni J. Young, American accounting professor
