= Nissinen =

Nissinen is a Finnish surname. Notable people with the surname include:

- Oskar Nissinen (1864–1937), Finnish politician
- Tatu Nissinen (1883–1966), Finnish agronomist and politician
- Lauri Nissinen (1918–1944), World War II flying ace in the Finnish Air Force
- Martti Nissinen (born 1959), Finnish theologian and professor
- Mikko Nissinen (born 1962), Finnish ballet dancer
- Joni Nissinen (born 1991), Finnish football player
