= List of Finnish MPs imprisoned in Russia =

This is a list of Finnish MPs who were imprisoned for political reasons in Russia.

== Jägers ==
Future MPs from the Jäger Movement were imprisoned or deported to Siberia for the crime of Lese Majesty during the period of the Grand Duchy of Finland.

Future MPs imprisoned or deported (to Siberia) for the crime of Lese Majesty during the period of the Grand Duchy of Finland.
MP	Party	MP period	Crime	Sourch
Aarne Sihvo	National Progressive Party	1919–1920	Imprisoned in St. Petersburg 1916–1917	
Artturi Leinonen	Agrarian League	1936–1939, 1944–1945	Deported to the Urals 1916–1917	

== Stalin's Purges ==
Imprisoned during Stalin's Purges
MP	Party	MP period	Exiled or Deported	Crime	Source
Matti Airola	Social Democratic Party	1908–1918,	exiled to Russia 1918	Imprisoned 1938	
Toivo Alavirta	Social Democratic Party	1917–1918	exiled to Russia 1918	Imprisoned 1937	
Aino Forsten	Social Democratic Party	1917–1918	exiled to Russia 1918	Imprisoned 1937	
Edvard Gylling	Social Democratic Party	1908–1910, 1911–1918	exiled to Russia 1920	Imprisoned 1937	
Herman Hurmevaara	Social Democratic Party	1917–1919	exiled to the Soviet Union 1930	Imprisoned 1937	
Oskari Ikonen	Social Democratic Party	1914–1917,	exiled to the Soviet Union 1927	Imprisoned 1938	
Väinö Kallio	Socialist Workers' Party	1929–1930	exiled to the Soviet Union 1933	Imprisoned 1938	
Hanna Karhinen	Social Democratic Party	1914–1917,	exiled to the Soviet Union 1926	Imprisoned 1938	
Feliks Kellosalmi	Social Democratic Party	1909–1911 and 1917–1918	exiled to Russia 1918	Imprisoned 1935	
Jalmari Kirjarinta	Social Democratic Party	1908–1910	exiled to Russia 1918	Imprisoned 1937	
Hanna Kohonen	Social Democratic Party	1917–1918	exiled to Russia 1918	Imprisoned 1937	
Jalo Kohonen	Social Democratic Party	1917–1918	exiled to Russia 1918	Imprisoned 1936	
Kalle Korhonen	Social Democratic Party	1917–1918	exiled to Russia 1918	Imprisoned 1937	
Kalle Kyhälä	Social Democratic Party	1929–1930	deported to the Soviet Union 1930	Imprisoned 1938	
Toivo Latva	Socialist Workers' Party	1927–1928	exiled to the Soviet Union 1931	Imprisoned 1936	
Jussi Lehtinen	Social Democratic Party	1917–1917	exiled to Russia 1918	Imprisoned 1937	
Jukka Lehtosaari	Social Democratic Party	1917–1918	exiled to Russia 1918	Imprisoned in Finland 1921-1926, Imprisoned 1937	
Kalle Lepola	Social Democratic Party	1917–1918	exiled to Russia 1918	Imprisoned in Finland 1922–1926, Imprisoned 1937	
Maikki Letonmäki	Social Democratic Party	1917	exiled to Russia 1918	Imprisoned 1937	
Jussi Lumivuokko	Social Democratic Party	1914–1917	exiled to Russia 1918	Imprisoned 1938	
Kullervo Manner	Social Democratic Party	1910–1014, 1917	exiled to Russia 1918	Imprisoned 1935	
Kalle Meriläinen	Socialist Workers' Party	1929–1930	deported to the Soviet Union 1930	Imprisoned 1937	
Jaakko Mäki	Social Democratic Party	1908–1918	exiled to Russia 1918	Imprisoned 1937	
Antti Nahkala	Socialist Workers' Party	1922–1924	exiled to the Soviet Union 1932	Imprisoned 1938	
Juho Perälä	Socialist Workers' Party	1928–1930	exiled to the Soviet Union 1930	Imprisoned 1937	
Hannes Pulkkinen	Socialist Workers' Party	1922–1924	exiled to the Soviet Union 1924	Imprisoned 1937	
Anni Rytkönen	Social Democratic Party	1919–1922	exiled to the Soviet Union 1927	Imprisoned 1937	
Asser Salo	Socialist Workers' Party	1929–1930	exiled to Sweden and later to the Soviet Union 1930	Imprisoned 1938	
Tyyne Salomaa	Social Democratic Party	1917	exiled to Russia 1918	Imprisoned 1938	
Emil Tabell	Socialist Workers' Party	1924–1930	deported to the Soviet Union 1930	Imprisoned 1937	
William Tanner	Socialist Workers' Party	1927–1930	exiled to the Soviet Union 1930	Imprisoned 1935	
Kalle Toppinen	Socialist Workers' Party	1922–1924	exiled to the Soviet Union	Imprisoned 1937	
Siina Urpilainen	Socialist Workers' Party	1927–1930	exiled to the Soviet Union 1931	Imprisoned 1938	
Arthur Usenius	Social Democratic Party	1917–1918	exiled to Russia 1920	Imprisoned 1937	
Jalmari Virta	Socialist Workers' Party	1924–1930	exiled to the Soviet Union 1930	Imprisoned 1937	
