= Rainio =

Rainio is a surname of Finnish origin. Notable people with the surname include:

- Aino Forsten (1885–1937), born Aina Rainio, Finnish politician and educator
- Jussi Rainio (1878–1918), Finnish journalist and politician
- Selma Rainio (1873–1939), Finnish missionary
- Väinö Rainio (1896–1979), Finnish athlete
