= Joni L. Rutter =

American geneticist

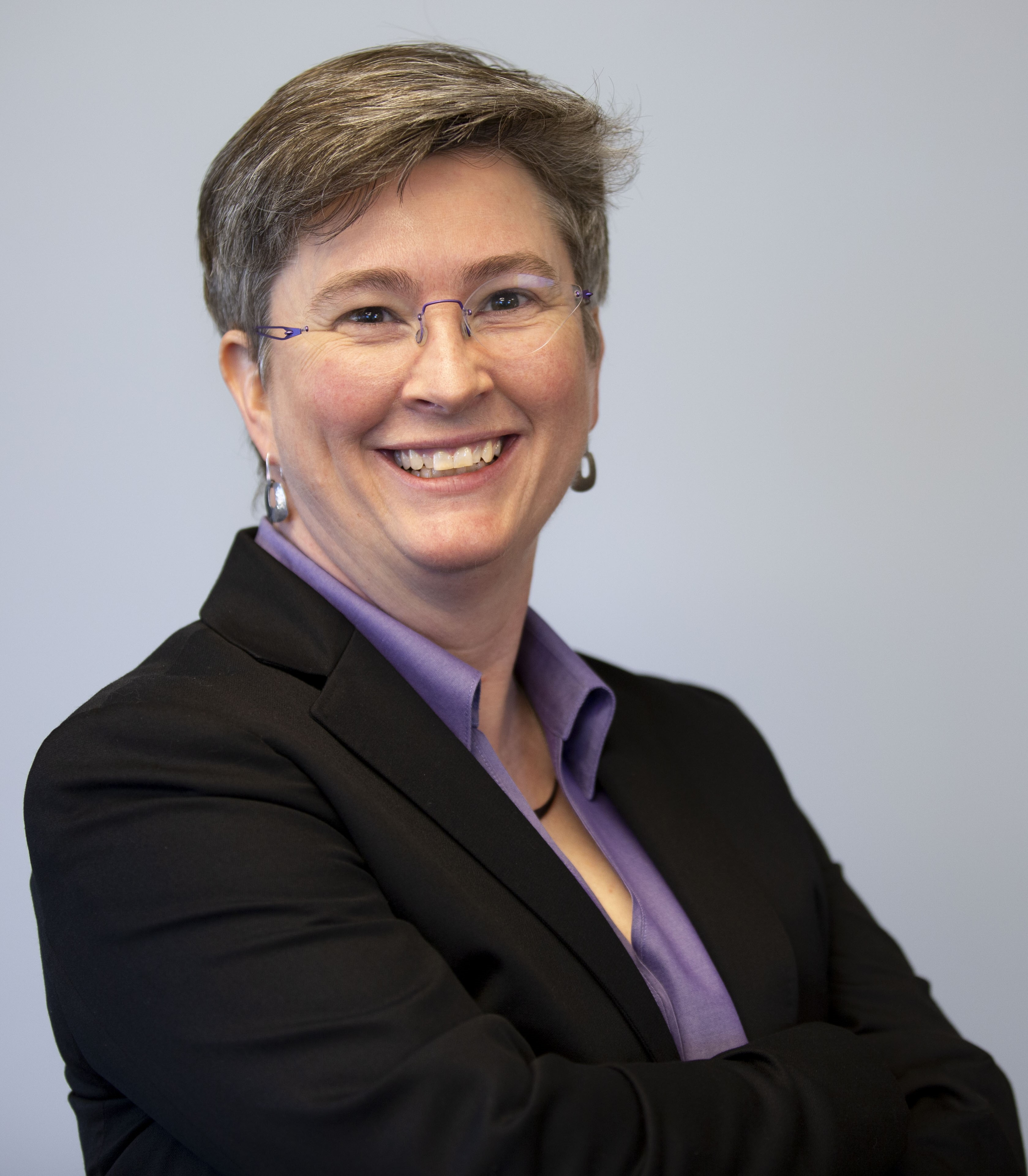
- Education: Dartmouth Medical School
- Scientific career
- Fields: Human genetics
- Workplaces: National Institutes of Health
- Doctoral advisor: Constance E. Brinckerhoff

Joni L. Rutter is an American geneticist and director of the National Center for Advancing Translational Sciences (NCATS). Rutter was previously director of the scientific programs in the All of Us initiative and served as the neuroscience and behavior division director at the National Institute on Drug Abuse. Her scientific experience includes clinical research in human genetics and environmental risk factors focusing on the fields of cancer and addiction.

== Education ==
Rutter earned her Ph.D. from Dartmouth Medical School in 1999. Her dissertation was titled, Cell-Type Specific Expression of Matrix Metalloproteinase-1 (MMP-1). Rutter's doctoral advisor was Constance E. Brinckerhoff. Rutter remained at Dartmouth Medical School as a research associate for a short period of time. She then accepted a fellowship at the National Cancer Institute within the division of cancer epidemiology and genetics to research human genetics.

== Career ==
In 2003, she joined the National Institute on Drug Abuse (NIDA). Rutter became the neuroscience and behavior division director in 2014 after serving as the acting director for three years. In this role, she developed and coordinated research on basic and clinical neuroscience, brain and behavioral development, genetics, epigenetics, computational neuroscience, bioinformatics, and drug discovery. Rutter also coordinated the NIDA Genetics Consortium and biospecimen repository.

Rutter served as the director of scientific programs within the All of Us Research Program, where she led the scientific programmatic development and implementation efforts to build a national research cohort of 1 million or more U.S. participants to advance precision medicine.

Rutter joined the National Center for Advancing Translational Sciences (NCATS) as the deputy director. In this role, she oversees the planning, executing and assessing the center's complex and multifaceted preclinical and clinical programs. She is a national spokesperson for translational science. Rutter helps guide the NCATS' Advisory Council and Cures Acceleration Network Review Board activities, and serves as the center's scientific liaison to All of Us. Upon the retirement of NCATS director Christopher P. Austin on April 15, 2021, Rutter became the acting director.

=== Research ===
Rutter is internationally recognized for her work in basic and clinical research in human genetics and in the study of genetic and environmental risk factors focusing on the fields of cancer and addiction. In 2015, Rutter stated that risk for addiction is approximately 50 percent genetic. Her primary scientific objective is to integrate genetic principles with environmental influences to more deeply inform understanding of how individual and societal factors impact health and disease.

== Selected works ==
- Rutter, Joni L.; Benbow, Ulrike; Coon, Charles I.; Brinckerhoff, Constance E. (1997). "Cell-type specific regulation of human interstitial collagenase-1 gene expression by interleukin-1β (IL-1β) in human fibroblasts and BC-8701 breast cancer cells". Journal of Cellular Biochemistry. 66 (3): 322–336. doi:10.1002/(SICI)1097-4644(19970901)66:3<322::AID-JCB5>3.0.CO;2-R. ISSN 1097-4644. PMID 9257189. S2CID 84974619.
- Rutter, Joni L.; Mitchell, Teresa I.; Butticè, Giovanna; Meyers, Jennifer; Gusella, James F.; Ozelius, Laurie J.; Brinckerhoff, Constance E. (December 1998). "A Single Nucleotide Polymorphism in the Matrix Metalloproteinase-1 Promoter Creates an Ets Binding Site and Augments Transcription". Cancer Research. 58 (23): 5321–5325. ISSN 0008-5472. PMID 9850057.
- Rutter, J. L.; Wacholder, S.; Chetrit, A.; Lubin, F.; Menczer, J.; Ebbers, S.; Tucker, M. A.; Struewing, J. P.; Hartge, P. (July 2003). "Gynecologic Surgeries and Risk of Ovarian Cancer in Women With BRCA1 and BRCA2 Ashkenazi Founder Mutations: An Israeli Population-Based Case-Control Study". Journal of the National Cancer Institute. 95 (14): 1072–1078. doi:10.1093/jnci/95.14.1072. ISSN 0027-8874. PMID 12865453.
