= Perttilä =

Perttilä is a surname originating in Finland. Notable people with the surname include:

- Emil Perttilä (1875–1933), Finnish politician
- Janne Perttilä, Finnish musician playing with Barren Earth and Rytmihäiriö bands
- Matti Perttilä (1896–1968), Finnish wrestler
- Valfrid Perttilä (1878–1953), Finnish politician
