= Savolainen =

Savolainen is a Finnish surname. Notable people with the surname include:

- Heikki Savolainen (1922–1975), Finnish actor
- Jarmo Savolainen (1961–2009), Finnish jazz keyboardist
- Salomo Savolainen (1883–1964), Finnish salesperson, warehouse manager and politician
- Vincent Savolainen (born 1966), Swiss-British-French biologist
- Vesa Savolainen (born 1944), Finnish professor of information systems science

In sports:

- Antti Savolainen (born 1988), Finnish ice hockey player
- Arto Savolainen (born 1941), Finnish wrestler
- Arvi Savolainen (born 1998), Finnish Greco-Roman wrestler
- Erkki Olavi Savolainen (1917–1993), Finnish boxer
- Heikki Savolainen (1907–1997), Finnish Olympic gymnast
- Jaana Savolainen (born 1964), Finnish cross-country skier
- Jani Savolainen (born 1988), Finnish professional ice hockey right winger
- Juska Savolainen (born 1983), Finnish footballer
- Jussi-Pekka Savolainen (born 1986), Finnish footballer
- Kimmo Savolainen (born 1974), Finnish ski jumper
- Marko Savolainen (born 1973), Finnish heavy-weight IFBB bodybuilder
- Mykola Savolaynen (born 1980), Ukrainian triple jumper
- Ronja Savolainen (born 1997), Finnish ice hockey player
- Saku Savolainen (born 1996), Finnish footballer
- Sanna Savolainen, Finnish ski-orienteering competitor
- Vili Savolainen (born 1985), Finnish footballer
