= Letonmäki =

Letonmäki is a Finnish surname. Notable people with the name include:

- Lauri Letonmäki (1886–1935), Finnish journalist, teacher, and politician
- Maria Letonmäki (1882–1937), Finnish politician, and wife of Lauri Letonmäki
