= Pekkarinen =

Pekkarinen is a Finnish surname. Notable people with the surname include:

- Pentti Pekkarinen (1917–1975), Finnish farmer and politician
- Mauri Pekkarinen (born 1947), Finnish politician
- Sannamaija Pekkarinen (born 1980), Finnish actress
- Veli-Pekka Pekkarinen (born 1969), Finnish ice hockey player
