= Liljeblad =

Liljeblad is a Swedish and Finnish surname. Notable people with the surname include:

- Emil Liljeblad (1876–1937), Finnish missionary and folkloristics researcher
- Joni Liljeblad (born 1989), Finnish ice hockey player
- Samuel Liljeblad (1761–1815), Swedish botanist and mycologist
