= Unique Ingredient Identifier =

FDA identifier in the Global Substance Registration System

The Unique Ingredient Identifier (UNII) is an alphanumeric identifier linked to a substance's molecular structure or descriptive information and is generated by the Global Substance Registration System (GSRS) of the Food and Drug Administration (FDA). It classifies substances as chemical, protein, nucleic acid, polymer, structurally diverse, or mixture according to the standards outlined by the International Organization for Standardization in ISO 11238 and ISO DTS 19844. UNIIs are non-proprietary, unique, unambiguous, and free to generate and use. A UNII can be generated for substances at any level of complexity, being broad enough to include "any substance, from an atom to an organism."

The GSRS is used to generate permanent, unique identifiers for substances in regulated products, such as ingredients in drug and biological products. The GSRS uses molecular structure, protein and nucleic sequences and descriptive information to generate the UNII. The preferred means for defining a chemical substance is by its two-dimensional molecular structure since it is pertinent to a substance's identity and information regarding a substance's stereochemistry is readily available. Nucleic acids are defined by their sequences and by any modifications that may be present. In the case of proteins only end-group modifications will be uniquely identified, along with any other modifications that are essential for activity. This is because of the inherently heterogenous nature of proteins. Therefore, two different protein substances can share the same UNII and yet have no biosimilarity or therapeutic equivalence. Polymers are defined by their structural repeating units and physical properties such as molecular weight or properties related to molecular weight (e.g. viscosity). Structurally diverse materials are inherently heterogenous preparations from natural materials such as plant extract and vaccines.

The GSRS is a freely distributable software system provided through a collaboration between the FDA, the National Center for Advancing Translational Sciences (NCATS) and the European Medicines Agency (EMA). The GSRS was developed to implement the ISO 11238 standard which is one of the core ISO Identification of Medicinal Product (IDMP) standards. The GSRS Board which governs the GSRS includes experts from FDA, European Regulatory Agencies, and the United States Pharmacopoeia (USP).

== Examples ==
Preferred Term	UNII
Methadone	UC6VBE7V1Z
Methadone hydrochloride	229809935B
Oxygen	S88TT14065
Hydrogen	7YNJ3PO35Z
Water	059QF0KO0R
