= Maikki =

Maikki is a Finnish feminine given name, which is one of the variations of the name Maria. Notable people with the name include:

- Maikki Friberg (1861–1927), Finnish educator, journal editor, suffragist and peace activist
- Maikki Järnefelt (1871–1929), Finnish operatic soprano, wife of Armas Järnefelt, and later of Selim Palmgren
- Maikki Letonmäki (1882–1937), a.k.a. Maria Letonmäki, Finnish politician
- Maikki Uotila (born 1977), Finnish ice dancer
