= Matti Airola =

Finnish politician and journalist (1882–1939)

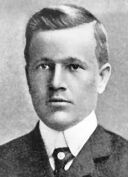
- Born: Mats Alexander Bruus; 18 March 1882; Ruokolahti
- Died: 12 October 1939; Leningrad
- Other names: Матвей Матвеевич Айрола (as a Soviet citizen)

Matti Aleksanteri Ariel (18 March 1882 – 12 October 1939) was a Finnish journalist, attorney and politician. He was a member of the Parliament of Finland from 1908 to 1918, representing the Social Democratic Party of Finland (SDP).

In 1918, during the Finnish Civil War, Airola served as a member of the Finnish People's Delegation, the government of the Finnish Socialist Workers' Republic. He was also a member of the Central Workers' Council. When the Red side lost the war, Airola fled to Soviet Russia, where he worked as a teacher in Gatchina and in Leningrad. He became a Soviet citizen in 1927.

In 1938, during the Great Purge, Airola was arrested by the NKVD and sentenced to five years in prison. He died in detention on 12 October 1939. He was posthumously rehabilitated by Soviet authorities in 1957.

== Early years and political activism ==
Matti Airola's parents were Matti Bruus (1845–1892), a laborer born in Ruokolahti, and Anna Kälviäinen (born 1846), who came from Lappeenranta Pitajä. He grew up in the suburbs of Vyborg in the poor working class district of Tiiliruukki. After his father's death, Airola worked from the age of ten, financing his schooling, among other things, as a newspaper boy. Airola graduated from Vyborg classical high school in 1902, after which he worked as a teacher.

Airola started organizing activities after finishing school. He wrote for the social-democratic newspaper Työ published in Vyborg since its founding in 1904. During the wave of strikes that began at the Putilov Ironworks then spread through a series of sympathy strikes, Airola and Hilja Pärssinen edited a duplicated newspaper called Lakkolehti. In January 1906, Airola was elected editor-in-chief of Työ.

He was elected as a Member of Parliament in 1908. The 26-year-old Airola was the youngest of the Social Democrats' 83 MPs. As an MP, Airola represented the western constituency of Vyborg until 1917, when he was elected to his last parliamentary term from the southern constituency of Häme.

In September 1911, Airola organized a demonstration at the Punaisenlähte Square, which defied the ban of Governor Frans von Pfaler, opposing the regional unification plan approved by Emperor Nicholas II. Airola was prevented from speaking at the square, so he arranged to give his fiery speech from the roof of the office building of the rural municipality of Viipur, which was located on the edge of the square. The demonstration eventually escalated into a riot, which required military personnel to suppress it. As a result of the incident, police chief Vilho Pekonen expelled Airola from Viipuri Province, after which Airola settled in Lahti.

Airola initially worked as a reporter for Raivaaja and from 1912 as a sales manager. In 1912, Airola was imprisoned for lèse-majesté and defamation for his newspaper writings. In the latter, Airola was considered to have insulted the honor of the Russian military in his article "The captains of the coffins swam in a row". In addition, he was fined for blasphemy for his article "Ukko Jehovah's ignorance".

== Activities during the Russian Civil War ==
In the fall of 1917, Airola was elected to the General Staff of the Workers' Order Guard. After the start of the civil war, Airola was elected to the SDP's new party council.

Airola gave the only speech criticizing the armed revolution at the first meeting of the council. According to Airola, the bourgeoisie could have been pressured into compromises even without violence, and he also feared that the revolution would eventually lead to a military dictatorship. In spite of his negative attitude, Airola accepted the position of Home Affairs Commissioner of the People's Delegation, i.e. Minister of the Interior, which he held together with Hanna Karhinen. Due to his legal knowledge, Airola was also elected chairman of the Constitutional Law Committee of the Main Council of Labor.

== In the Soviet Union ==
At the beginning of April, the people's delegation was evacuated to Vyborg, from where Airola fled to Soviet Russia. He worked as a teacher at the Finnish seminary in Hatsina from 1921 to 1925 and as a Finnish language teacher at the Finnish Technical University in Leningrad from 1925 to 1936. In addition to his teaching work, Airola translated textbooks and information books into Finnish and published two Finnish language textbooks.

In 1927, he received Soviet citizenship. During Stalin's persecutions, Airola was dismissed from his post and sentenced in July 1939 to five years in prison. Airola died in a prison hospital in October 1939. He was rehabilitated at his son's request in 1957.

== Personal life ==
Airola married Hilja Siviä Korhonen (1881–1947), who was born in Vyborg, in 1906. Their sons were journalist Eino Airola (1907–1984) and writer Veikko Airola. Eino, who served in the air force, was expelled from Leningrad in 1942 and he and his family settled in Uzbekistan.

== See also ==
- List of Finnish MPs imprisoned in Russia
- List of MPs in Finland imprisoned for political reasons
