= Catherine M. Cahill =

American neuroscientist

Catherine Marie Cahill is a Canadian neuropharmacologist who is a professor in the Department of Psychiatry and Biobehavioral Sciences at the University of California, Los Angeles. Her research focuses on how chronic pain states modulate reward circuitry and change dopaminergic transmission responsible for motivated behavior.

== Life ==
Cahill received a Bachelor of Science in chemistry from Mount Allison University (1987) and then completed her Masters of Science and PhD in the Department of Pharmacology from Dalhousie University (1996) under Jana Sawynok.

Cahill's research investigates how chronic pain can alter specific brain regions associated with emotion, fear, and motivation, and neural plasticity that occurs due to persistent pain and opioid use. Her research is a part of a National Institutes of Health Funded Center of Excellence on Opioid Research and Drug Addiction (CSORDA). In addition, her research is funded by the National Center for Advancing Translational Sciences, the National Institute of Aging, the National Institute of Dental and Craniofacial Research, the Department of Defense and the Shirley and Stefan Hatos Foundation.
