= NCATS =

NCATS may refer to:

- National Center for Advancing Translational Sciences
- NASCAR Canadian Tire Series
