= Maaninka =

Former municipality in the region of North Savo, Finland

- Former municipality
- Maaningan kunta Maaninka kommun
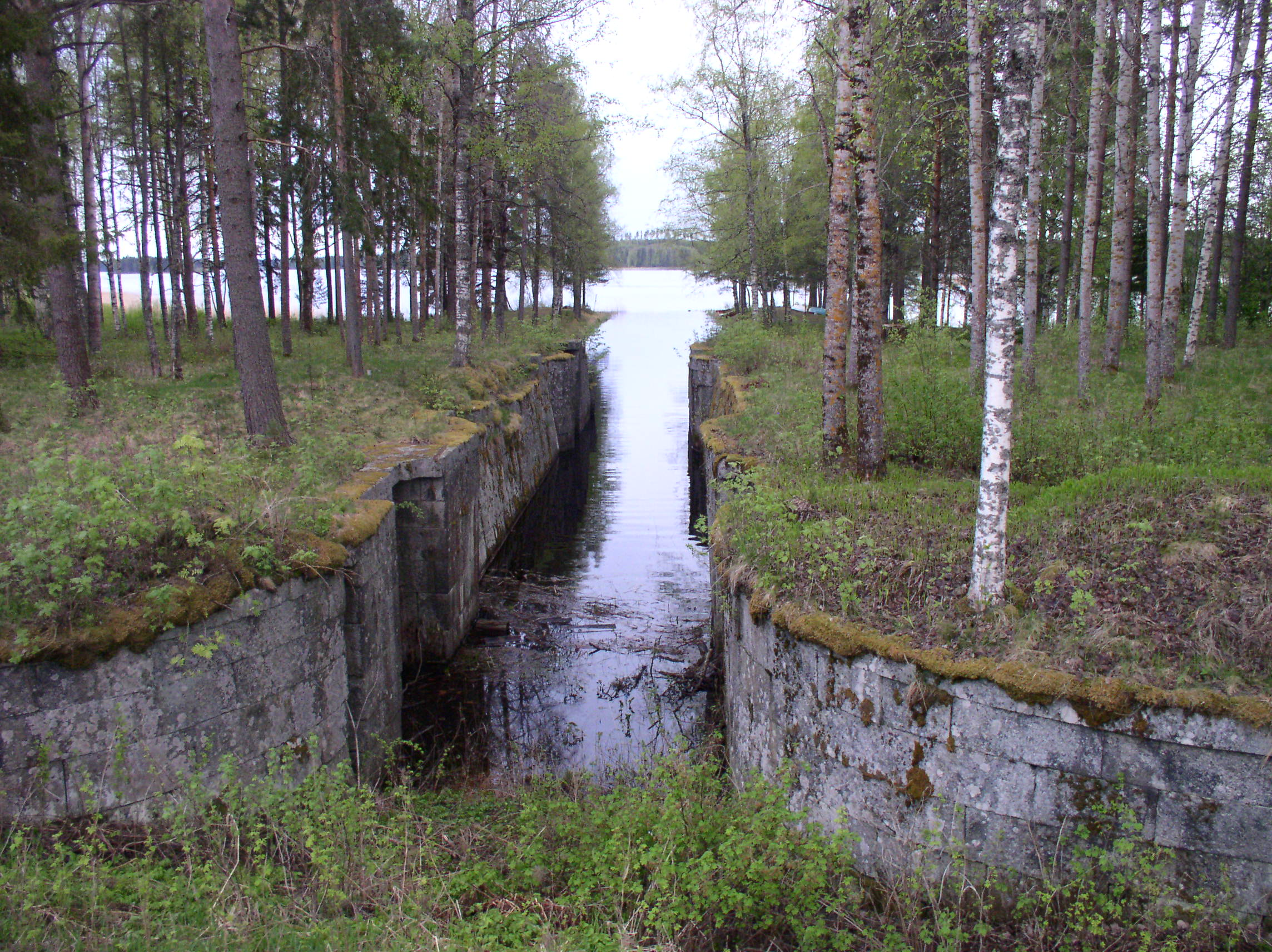
- Old Vianta channel in Maaninka

- Coat of arms

- Location of Maaninka in Finland
- Coordinates: 63°09.5′N 027°18′E
- Country: Finland
- Region: North Savo
- Sub-region: Kuopio sub-region
- Charter: 1872
- Merged: 2015

Government
  - Municipal manager: Soile Lahti

Area
  - Total: 575.13 km^{2} (222.06 sq mi)
  - Land: 466.51 km^{2} (180.12 sq mi)
  - Water: 108.62 km^{2} (41.94 sq mi)

Population (2014-11-30)
  - Total: 3,747
  - Density: 8.032/km^{2} (20.80/sq mi)
- Time zone: UTC+2 (EET)
  - Summer (DST): UTC+3 (EEST)
- Website: www.maaninka.fi

Maaninka (Swedish: Maaninka, also Maninga) is a former municipality in the region of North Savo, Finland. It was merged with the city of Kuopio on 1 January 2015.

The municipality had a population of 3,747 people as of the 30th of November 2014, and it covered an area of 575.13 square kilometres (222.06 sq mi), of which 108.62 square kilometres (41.94 sq mi) was water. The population density was 8.03 inhabitants per square kilometre (20.8/sq mi).

The municipality is mostly rugged forestland. The tallest waterfall in Finland, at 36 metres (118 ft) high, is located in Maaninka. The site, called Korkeakoski, has been a tourist site since the 19th century.

The municipality was unilingually Finnish.

== People born in Maaninka ==
- Taavetti Lapveteläinen (1860–1919)
- Nestor Väänänen (1877–1930)
- Tahvo Hiekkaranta (1879–1947)
- Tatu Nissinen (1883–1966)
- Salomo Savolainen (1883–1964)
- Pentti Pekkarinen (1917–1975)
- Olavi Kuronen (1923–1989)
- Tuula Väätäinen (1955–)
- Jari Räsänen (1966–)

== Gallery ==
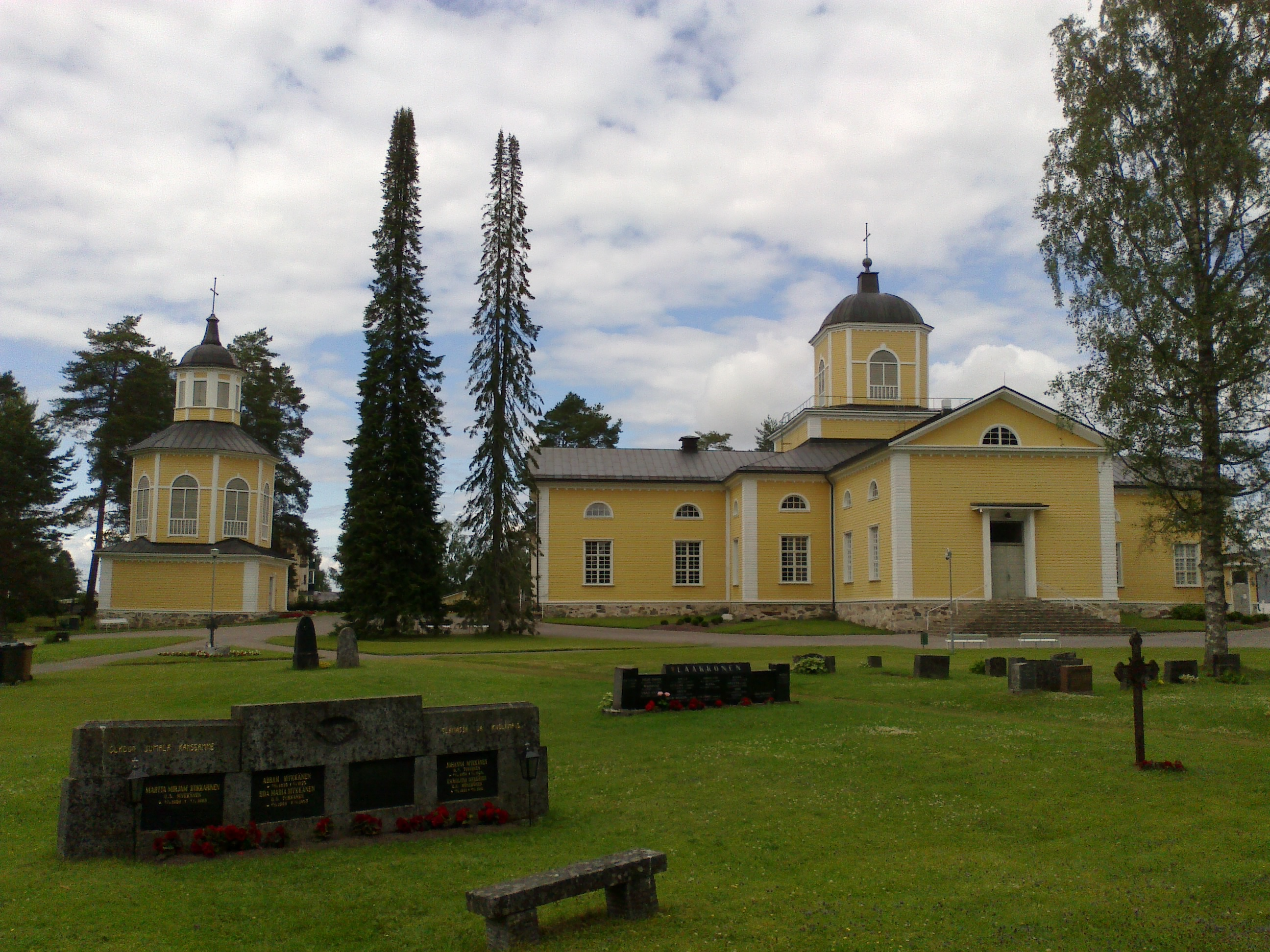
The Lutheran Church of Maaninka

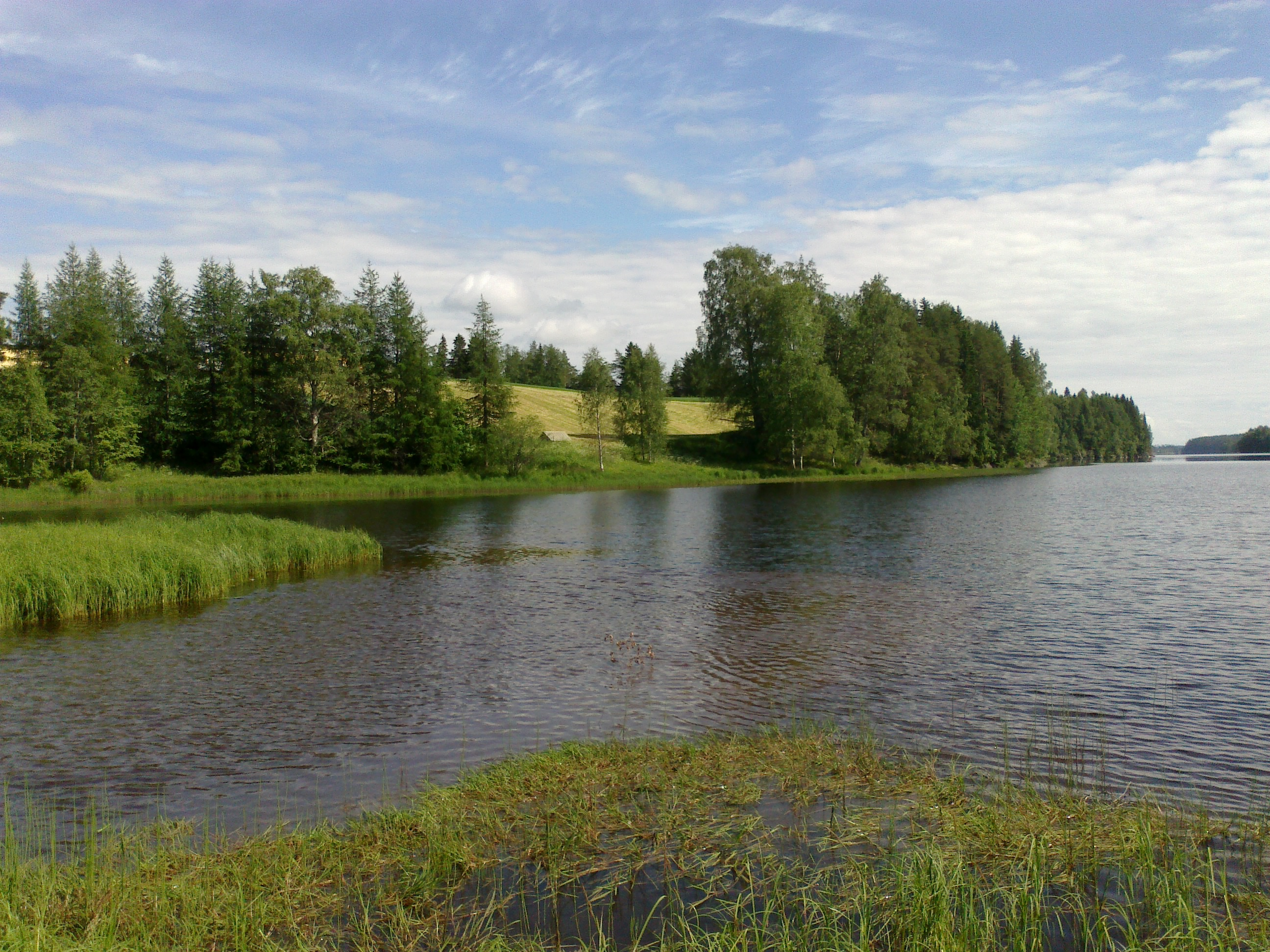
The Lake Maaninkajärvi in the village of Tuovilanlahti, Maaninka.

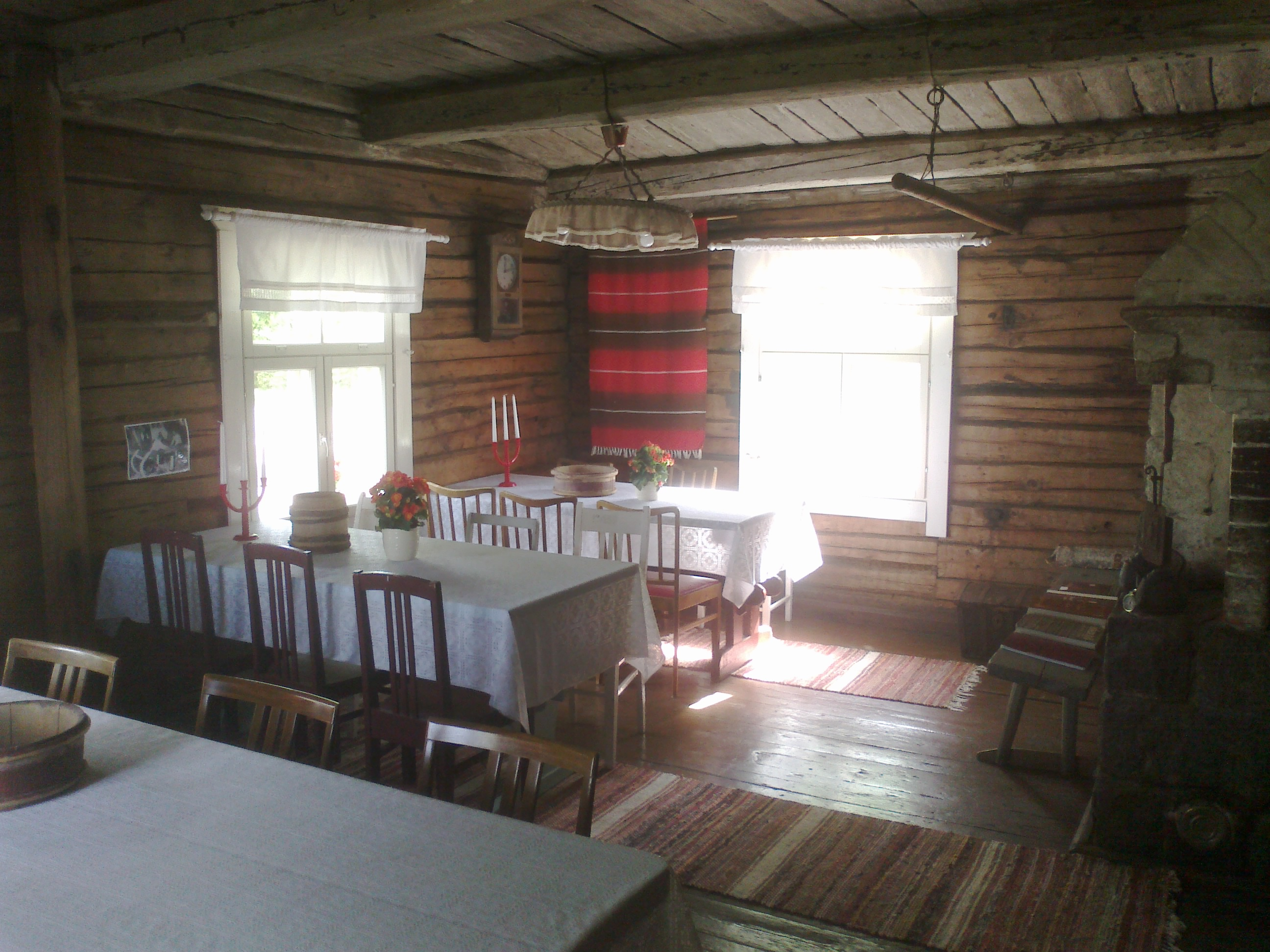
The Kalapuro House serves as museum, Tuovilanlahti, Maaninka

== See also ==
- Finnish national road 77
