= Tahvo Hiekkaranta =

Finnish tailor and politician

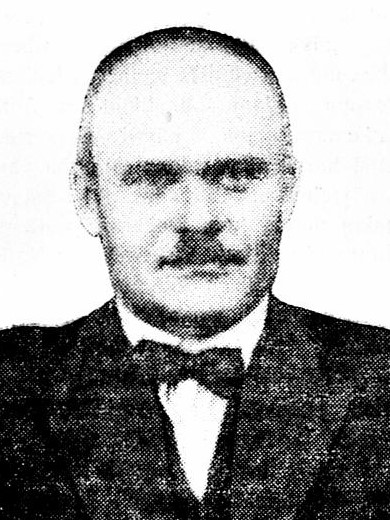
Image of Tahvo Hiekkaranta

Staffan (Tahvo) Hiekkaranta (26 December 1879, Maaninka - 11 September 1947; surname until 1906 Hoffrén) was a Finnish tailor and politician. He was a member of the Parliament of Finland from 1916 to 1917, representing the Social Democratic Party of Finland (SDP). He was imprisoned from 1918 to 1919 for having sided with the Reds during the Finnish Civil War.
