= Aatto Sirén =

Finnish and politician (1873–1955)

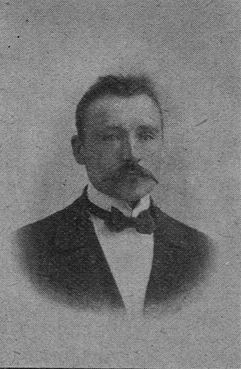
- Aatto Sirén in 1907
- Born: December 23, 1873
- Died: March 14, 1955 (aged 81)
- Known for: Finnish smallholder and politician

Adolf Johan (Aatto) Sirén (23 December 1873 – 14 March 1955) was a Finnish smallholder and politician, born in Orimattila. He was a member of the Parliament of Finland from 1907 to 1913, from 1916 to 1918, from 1929 to 1930 and from 1933 to 1936, representing the Social Democratic Party of Finland (SDP). He was a presidential elector in the 1931 and 1943 presidential elections. During the Finnish Civil War of 1918, Sirén was a member of the Central Workers' Council of Finland, the legislature of the Finnish Socialist Workers' Republic. After the defeat of the Red side, he went into exile in Soviet Russia. He returned to Finland in the summer of 1921. In September 1921, he was given a prison sentence of nine years for his role in the Civil War. However, in October 1922 he was pardoned.
