= Olavi Kuronen =

Finnish ski jumper (1923–1989)

Eino Olavi Kuronen (22 January 1923 in Maaninka – 8 January 1989) was a Finnish ski jumper who competed in the 1950s. He finished tied for 12th in the individual large hill event at the 1952 Winter Olympics in Oslo.
