= Nestor Väänänen =

Finnish politician (1877–1930)

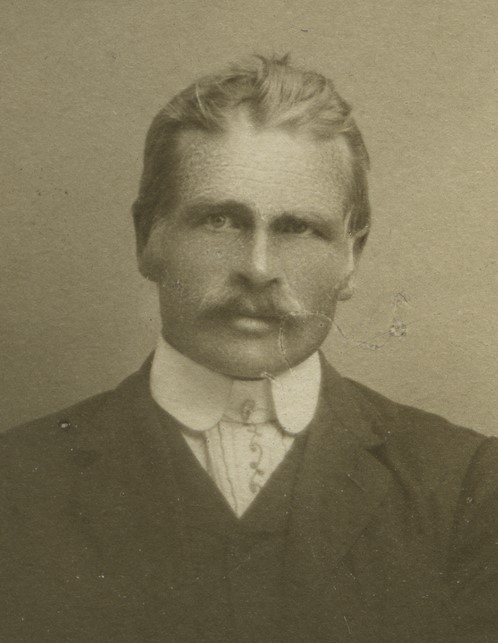
Nestor Väänänen (1887-1930)

Nestor Väänänen (1 July 1877, Maaninka - 13 April 1930) was a Finnish farmer and politician. He was a member of the Parliament of Finland from 1911 to 1916, representing the Social Democratic Party of Finland (SDP).
