= Central Workers' Council of Finland =

Parliamentary body during the civil war era

History
- Established: 14 February 1918
- Disbanded: 10 April 1918

Leadership
- Chairman: Valfrid Perttilä

Central Workers' Council of Finland (Finnish: Työväen pääneuvosto, Swedish: Arbetarnas centralråd) was the legislature of the Red side of the 1918 Civil War of Finland. It was appointed by the Workers' Council of People's Representatives to serve as a parliamentary body and supervise the Finnish People's Delegation.

Central Workers' Council was composed of 40 members who represented the Social Democratic Party of Finland (SDP), the Finnish Trade Union Federation (SAJ), the Red Guards and the Helsinki Workers' Council. SDP had 15 representatives, SAJ and the Red Guards 10 each and the Helsinki Workers' Council 5. The chairman was Valfrid Perttilä, a former member of the Parliament of Finland. Central Workers' Council had 5 standing committees; the Constitution Committee, Legal Affairs Committee, Finance Committee, War and Economy Committee and the Foreign Affairs Committee.

The Central Workers' Council was active from 14 February to 10 April 1918. Sessions took place at the House of Estates in Helsinki, and in April in Vyborg where the Red administration was evacuated prior to the Battle of Helsinki. Likewise the People's Delegation, the Central Workers' Council was planned as a contemporary body as the constitution was to be passed on a referendum. However, the Red power collapsed in late April and most of the leading Reds fled to the Soviet Russia.

== Selected representatives ==
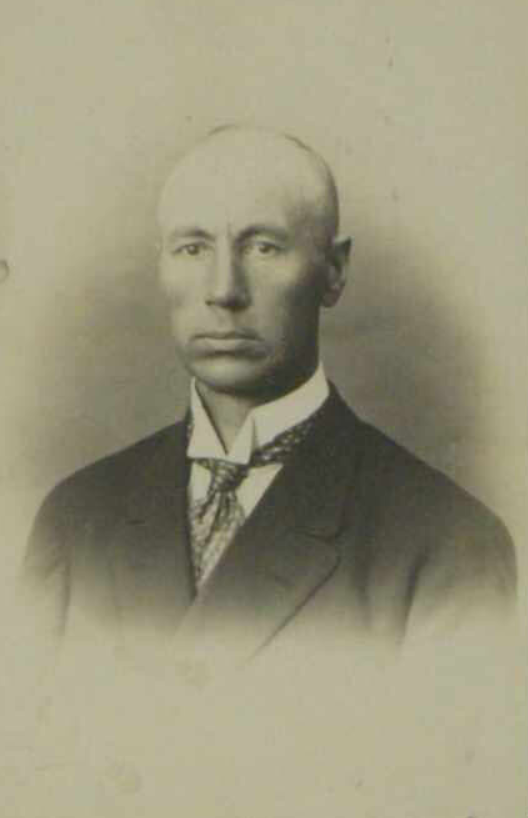
Chairman Valfrid Perttilä

The complete list of members of the Central Workers' Council is unknown as the documents are missing or destroyed. According to the historian Osmo Rinta-Tassi, at least 48 persons, including the deputy representatives, took part on the sessions. The full assemblies of Finance and Foreign Affairs Committees are also missing.

Leadership

- Valfrid Perttilä (chairman)
- August Lehto (1st vice chairman)
- Kaarlo Tuominen (2nd vice chairman)
- Väinö Jokinen (secretary)

Constitution Committee

- Matti Airola (chairman), Erkki Härmä, Ida Aalle-Teljo, Väinö Jokivirta, Väinö Toikka

Legal Affairs Committee

- Aura Kiiskinen (chairman), Taavetti Lapveteläinen, Anni Savolainen, Mikko Aaltio, A. Veijola

Finance Committee

- Heikki Jalonen (chairman), Aino Forsten, Juho Komu, E. Karhunen

War and Economy Committee

- Valter Vihriä (chairman), Emil Peltonen (chairman), Hanna Malm, Akseli Kokkola, Karl Emil Hypén, Erik J. Salo

Foreign Affairs Committee

- Aatto Sirén (chairman), Anton Huotari

Other

- Kustaa Ahmala, Aapo Harjula, Hilda Herrala, Hanna Karhinen, Adam Laakkonen, Onni Tuomi
