= Aapo Harjula =

Finnish politician

Member of Parliament for Finland
- In office 1917–1918

Personal details
- Born: Abraham (Aapo) Harjula; 18 December 1880 Laukaa, Finland
- Died: 7 September 1961 (aged 80)
- Citizenship: Finnish
- Party: Social Democratic Party
- Occupation: Cooperative inspector, politician

Abraham (Aapo) Harjula (18 December 1880, in Laukaa – 7 September 1961) was a Finnish cooperative inspector and politician. He was a member of the Parliament of Finland from 1917 to 1918, representing the Social Democratic Party of Finland (SDP). During the 1918 Finnish Civil War Harjula was a member of the Central Workers' Council of Finland. After the war he was in prison until 1921.
