= Taavetti Lapveteläinen =

Finnish politician

Daavid Taavetti Lapveteläinen (1860-1919)

Daavid (Taavetti) Latveteläinen (19 November 1860 – 1 July 1919) was a Finnish construction worker and politician. He was born in Maaninka and was a member of the Parliament of Finland from 1911 to 1918, representing the Social Democratic Party of Finland (SDP). During the Finnish Civil War Lapveteläinen was a member of the Central Workers' Council. He was imprisoned after the war and died in detention in 1919. He died in Helsinki.
