= Veli-Pekka Pekkarinen =

Finnish ice hockey defenceman

- Born: August 24, 1969 (age 55); Kuopio, Finland
- Height: 5 ft 10 in (178 cm)
- Weight: 187 lb (85 kg; 13 st 5 lb)
- Position: Defence
- Shot: Left
- Played for: KalPa
- Playing career: 1987–2003

Veli-Pekka-Pekkarinen (born August 24, 1969) is a Finnish former professional ice hockey defenceman.

Pekkarinen played most of his career with KalPa, playing a total of 391 games for the team over twelve seasons, including 295 games in the SM-liiga.

== Career statistics ==
			Regular season					Playoffs
Season	Team	League	GP	G	A	Pts	PIM	GP	G	A	Pts	PIM
1986–87	KalPa U20	Jr. A I-divisioona	26	9	9	18	20	—	—	—	—	—
1986–87	KalPa	SM-liiga	3	0	0	0	0	—	—	—	—	—
1987–88	KalPa U20	Jr. A I-divisioona	27	15	19	34	32	—	—	—	—	—
1987–88	KalPa	SM-liiga	18	1	2	3	4	—	—	—	—	—
1988–89	KalPa U20	Jr. A SM-sarja	9	1	7	8	10	—	—	—	—	—
1988–89	KalPa	SM-liiga	11	1	2	3	2	—	—	—	—	—
1989–90	KalPa	SM-liiga	44	5	3	8	14	6	0	3	3	2
1990–91	KalPa	SM-liiga	43	10	8	18	19	6	0	0	0	4
1991–92	KalPa	SM-liiga	44	2	16	18	34	—	—	—	—	—
1992–93	TUTO Hockey	I-Divisioona	44	3	16	19	26	6	1	0	1	2
1993–94	KalPa	SM-liiga	39	4	3	7	18	—	—	—	—	—
1994–95	KalPa	SM-liiga	50	1	8	9	26	3	0	0	0	0
1995–96	KalPa	SM-liiga	28	0	2	2	6	—	—	—	—	—
1996–97	SiiHT	III-divisioona	—	4	19	23	—	—	—	—	—	—
1997–98	KJK	II-divisioona	11	3	7	10	8	—	—	—	—	—
1998–99	Iisalmen Peli-Karhut	II-divisioona	11	1	7	8	6	—	—	—	—	—
1999–00	KalPa	Suomi-sarja	27	5	14	19	20	—	—	—	—	—
2000–01	KalPa	Suomi-sarja	29	7	16	23	16	10	3	6	9	2
2002–03	KalPa	Mestis	26	7	9	16	6	4	0	1	1	2
SM-liiga totals			280	24	44	68	123	15	0	3	3	6
