= Joni Tuominen =

Finnish ice hockey defenceman

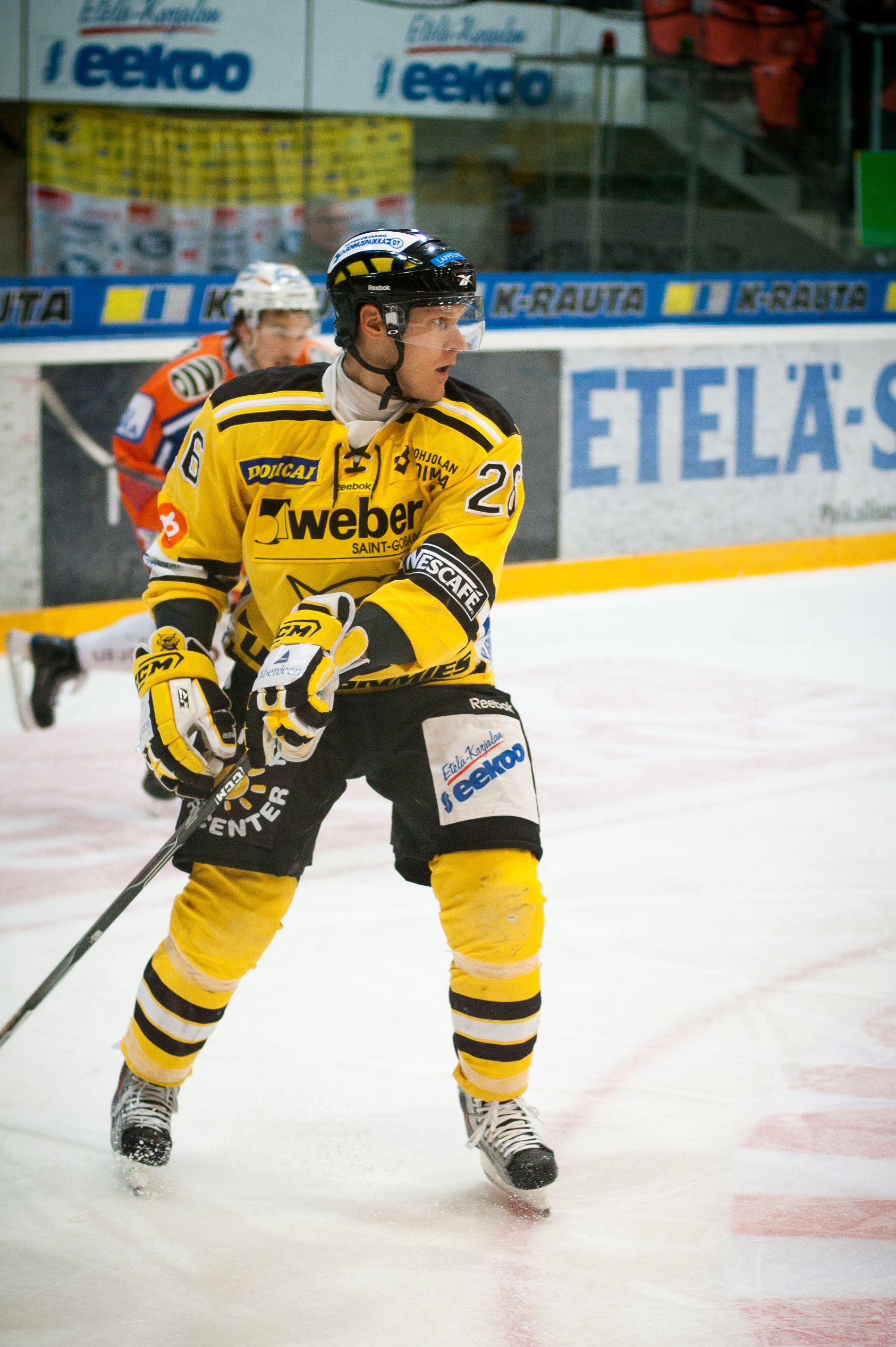
- Born: September 4, 1982 (age 43) Espoo, Finland
- Height: 5 ft 9 in (175 cm)
- Weight: 187 lb (85 kg; 13 st 5 lb)
- Position: Defence
- Shoots: Right
- team Former teams: Free agent Espoo Blues; Lahti Pelicans; SaiPa; TPS; HPK; Dresdner Eislöwen; STS Sanok; Manchester Phoenix; DVTK Jegesmedvék; Ferencváros
- NHL draft: Undrafted
- Playing career: 2003–present

Joni Tuominen (born September 4, 1982) is a Finnish professional ice hockey defenceman who is currently a free agent having last played for Ferencváros in the Erste Liga.

He previously played in Finland for Espoo Blues of the Liiga. As a free agent, Tuominen opened up to the possibility of playing abroad after ten seasons in Finland, when he accepted an (unsuccessful) try-out with Czech club, HC Olomouc on August 11, 2014. Instead, he spent the 2014–15 season playing in Germany's DEL2 with Dresdner Eislöwen. He moved to Poland's STS Sanok for the 2015–16 season, and spent the 2016–17 season with the EIHL's Manchester Phoenix and DVTK Jegesmedvék of the Erste Liga.
