= Constance Brinckerhoff =

American microbiologist

- Born: Constance Elizabeth Laurence; 1942 (age 83–84)
- Education: Smith College; University at Buffalo
- Spouse: Robert Brinckerhoff (m. 1963)
- Children: 3
- Scientific career
- Fields: Microbiology
- Workplaces: Geisel School of Medicine

Constance Elizabeth Brinckerhoff (née Laurence; born 1942) is an American microbiologist and an emeritus professor of medicine at the Geisel School of Medicine.

== Life ==
The eldest of five children born to social worker Elizabeth E. (Zimmerman) Laurence (died 1982) and physician Dr. Maurice K. Laurence (originally Maurice Kamm Lurensky; died 2000), Constance Laurence Brinckerhoff earned a B.A. in biology, cum laude, in 1963 at Smith College. She completed a M.A. (1966) and Ph.D. (1968) in microbiology and immunology at the University at Buffalo.

Brinckerhoff was the director of bacteriology at Brattleboro Memorial Hospital from 1969 to 1971. In 1972, she joined the Geisel School of Medicine as a research associate and postdoc with rheumatologist Edward Harris. She became the Nathan Smith Professor of Medicine and Biochemistry in 1993. She was the acting provost of Dartmouth College from 1998 to 1999. She is emeritus professor of medicine at Dartmouth.

In 1999, Brinckerhoff was awarded a MERIT grant (Method to Extend Research in Time) from the National Institute of Arthritis and Musculoskeletal and Skin Diseases.

== Personal life ==
A breast cancer survivor, Constance Brinckerhoff and husband, Dr. Robert Brinckerhoff, have three children.
