= Emil Perttilä =

Finnish politician

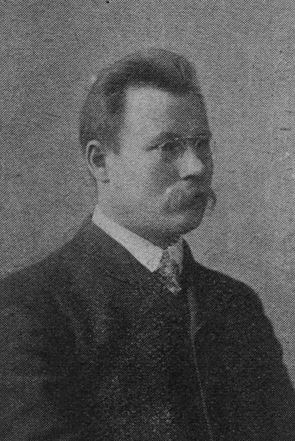

Member of the Finnish Parliament for Uusimaa
- In office 22 May 1907 – 31 July 1908

Personal details
- Born: 18 February 1875 Isokyrö, Grand Duchy of Finland
- Died: 21 August 1933 (aged 58) Seattle, Washington
- Party: Social Democratic

Jacob Emil Perttilä (born Ahlberg, since 1909 Palander, 18 February 1875 – 21 August 1933) was a Finnish politician and trade unionist. He was a Member of the Parliament of Finland for the Social Democratic Party in 1907-1908. Perttilä was also known as a playwright who wrote comedy scripts.

== Life ==
Emil Perttilä was born in Isokyrö, Ostrobothnia as an illegitimate child of a housemaid. He worked as a carpenter in 1890s in Helsinki before becoming the treasurer of the Social Democratic Party in 1904. Perttilä was the chairman of the Finnish Carpenters Union 1899, the chairman of the Central Committee of the Finnish general strike of 1905 and the chairman of the Social Democratic Party 1905-1906. He was also a founder of the Finnish Trade Union Federation, established 1907.

In March 1909, Perttilä quit his post and took a small sum of money from the party treasury. He sailed to Cape Town where he was arrested and sent back to Finland. According to Perttilä, he fled because irregularities had been discovered in the party accounts and his life had been threatened. Perttilä was sentenced a year in prison later that year, but he left the country again. In December 1909, Perttilä arrived in New York with a Swedish passport under the alias Emil Palander, eventually settling in Seattle in 1914. He died there in 1933.

Emil Perttilä was the stepbrother of the politician Valfrid Perttilä.
