= Pentti Pekkarinen =

Finnish politician

Pentti August Pekkarinen (20 September 1917 in Maaninka – 20 January 1975) was a Finnish farmer and politician. He served as Deputy Minister of Social Affairs from 4 September 1972 until his death on 20 January 1975. He was a member of the Parliament of Finland from 1958 until his death in 1975, representing the Agrarian League (which changed its name to Centre Party in 1965).
