= Joni Mabe =

American book artist

Joni Mabe (born 1957) is an American book artist. A native of Georgia, she has lived in Athens, Georgia and Cornelia, Georgia. She is the creator of the Everything Elvis Museum, which is housed in her greatgrandparents' restored boardinghouse in Cornelia, Georgia. The building is on the National Register of Historic Places and contains both her own family memorabilia and 30,000 items related to Elvis Presley. She is a Master of Fine Arts recipient from the University of Georgia.

== Exhibitions ==
Joni Mabe's exhibitions include: a selection of her original, one-of-a kind artist's books shown in an international book art exhibition, Art ex Libris at Artspace Gallery in Richmond, Virginia in 1994.; The American South Everything Elvis, Royal Festival Hall Galleries; The Alternative Page, Hastings-en-Hudson: The Gallery at Hastings, 1996; Art of Concourse E., Atlanta: Hartsfield Atlanta International Airport; 50 Days of Elvis. Melbourne, Florida: Brevard Art Center & Museum; I Could Have Saved Elvis if I had Been Born Earlier, but I Was Born in 1957, Atlanta: Sandler Hudson Gallery, 1989; Vital Signs, Atlanta: Nexus Contemporary Art Center, 1991; Joni Mabe's Traveling Tribute to Legends of Country Music, New York: Center for Book Arts in 1992; Joni Mabe and Her World Famous Traveling Panoramic Encyclopedia of Everything Elvis, in Los Angeles at The Ernie Wolf Gallery in 1993; and Elvis + Marilyn in 1997 at the Honolulu Academy of Arts. She was featured in No Outsiders: The 2019 Atlanta Biennial at Atlanta Contemporary, with a piece from the BURNAWAY in 2019.

Mabe's exhibition Hollywood of The Southeastern Artists in the Atlanta Biennial was reviewed in the 2019 article "The Artists in the Atlanta Biennial May Not Be Mainstream—But Don’t Call Them Outsiders" by Maura Callahan, who concluded that "The curators of this year's biennial refuse the impossible task of defining Southern art." Mabe has three objects in the permanent collection of the Museum of Contemporary Art of Georgia. Mabe conducts tours of The Loudermilk Boarding House which contains the Everything Elvis collection. In 2020 she was one of three women artists featured in the exhibition Southern Values. Her exhibition "Dead Southern Icons of 20th Century" can be found in Hartsfield-Jackson International Airport, Concourse E, Gate 30.

In fall 2026, she was the subject of a full-length documentary, "Everything Elvis: The Art (and Obsessions!) of Joni Mabe," by Atlanta filmmaker Hal Jacobs.

== Books ==
In 1993 she published the paperback Joni Mabe's classic postcard book: From her museum of obsessions, personalities, & oddities. In 1994 she participated in Art ex Libris, an international exhibition of original book art at Artspace Gallery in Richmond, Virginia. Published in 1988, Joni Mabe's museum book : the first museum in book form is an artist's book in the Gunst Collection of Special Collections at Stanford University. Her Elvis Presley Scrapbook, one of only four copies made and signed by the artist, was sold by Swann Galleries.

== Awards ==
She was the recipient of a Ford Foundation grant in 2018 and became a fellow of the Southeastern Center of Contemporary Art /RJ Reynolds in 1987.
