= Hanna Karhinen =

Finnish politician, member of parliament

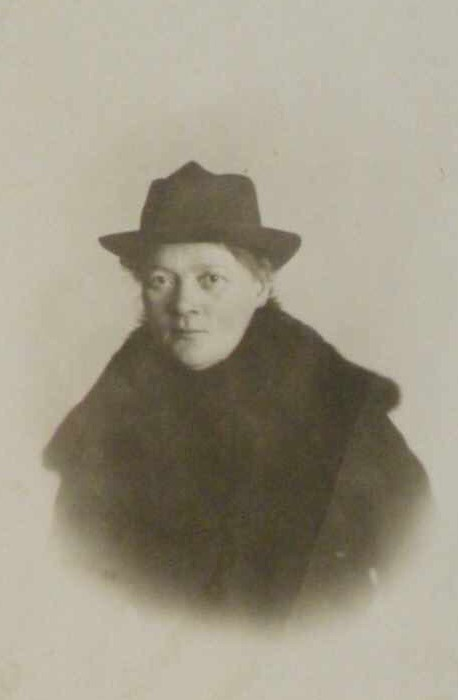
- Karhinen in 1919
- Born: Johanna Sofia Andelin; 16 June 1878; Vyborg, Russian Empire
- Died: 27 September 1938 (aged 60); Aunus, Russian SFSR
- Other name: Anna Leppänen
- Occupations: Politician, member of parliament

Hanna Karhinen (née Johanna Sofia Andelin) (16 June 1878 – 27 September 1938) was a Finnish Social Democratic Party and later Communist Party politician and activist. She served in the Parliament of Finland from 1913 to 1916. During the 1918 Finnish Civil War Karhinen was a member of the Central Workers' Council of Finland and commissioner of interior in the Finnish People's Delegation. She was executed in 1938.

== Life ==
=== Early years ===
Karhinen was born 16 June 1878 in Vyborg, now Russia to Johan Fredrik Andelin (1851–1878), a shoemaker born in Joensuu, now Finland, and Johanna Natalia Malmström (1839–1923), a native of Heinola, Finland. Karen's father died just a week before his daughter was born. Not much is known about Karhinen's early years, but she attended elementary and church school in St. Petersburg while learning Russian. In 1899, Karhinen married and moved to Terijoki, Russia.

=== Activism ===
Karhinen, who was a housewife, joined the SDP in 1902, and a year later she was elected chairman of the women's section of the Terijoki Workers' Association. Karhinen was also a member of the Federal Council of the Social Democratic Women 's Union and assisted in the publication Worker 's Woman. In addition, Karhinen wrote educational booklets for women, in which she presented her modern views on raising children and advised working women to get involved in municipal politics. Karhinen was elected Member of Parliament in the 1913 parliamentary elections and renewed her seat in 1916 but dropped out of parliament in the October 1917 election.

=== Finnish Civil War ===
With the Civil War, which started in 1918, Karhinen worked in Helsinki as the secretary and interpreter of the Interior Department of the People's Delegation. She was also elected to the General Council of Labor and became chairman of the General Affairs Committee of the General Council. Karhinen was appointed a member of the People's Delegation in connection with the reorganization on 11 March, when she became the second Home Affairs Commissioner alongside Matti Airola.

After the People's Delegation moved to Vyborg in early April, Karhinen continued with eight delegates to Soviet Russia, from which she returned on April 20. The purpose of the trip remains unclear, but according to some information, Karhinen and her friend Hilja Pärssinen would have taken a large amount of the Bank of Finland's funds to St. Petersburg. After her return, Karhinen resigned from the People's Delegation because she did not accept the decision to send conscripts to the front.

=== In Sweden and the United States ===
At the end of the Battle of Vyborg, April 1918, Karhinen fled again to Russia, where she joined the Finnish Communist Party in Moscow in the autumn. In December 1918, Karhinen fled to Sweden and lived there as a political refugee for two years.

In 1920, on the initiative of Finnish politician Yrjö Sirola, Karhinen was sent to the United States as a representative of the Comintern to carry out educational work among American Finns. Karhinen, who used the pseudonym “Anna Leppänen,” first worked for the Forward magazine on the East Coast and later for the magazine Toveritar in Astoria, Oregon. In addition, she was a speaker for the American Socialist Organization before it dissolved in 1921. She lived in the United States until 1926.

=== In the Soviet Union ===
Karhinen settled in the Soviet Union in 1926 and was active as a state and party functionary in the Karelian ASSR.

In 1936, Karhinen was expelled from NKP membership on charges of links to enemies. The background was apparently Karhinen's correspondence with her daughter, who had moved to Stockholm, Sweden in 1934. Karhinen was arrested in June 1938, during the Great Purge, and charged with being involved in underground counter-revolutionary activities. She was executed on 27 September 1938, on the outskirts of the town called Aunus, Russia.

Karhinen's reputation was restored by the Supreme Soviet of the Soviet Union in 1989.

== Family ==
In 1899, Hannah married Tuomas Tuomaanpoika Karhinen (b. 1867), a train police officer from Räisälä. The couple had one daughter, Veera Muberg. The marriage ended in 1913.

== Sources ==
- Hanna Karhinen. Edustajamatrikkeli. Kansanedustajat 1907 –. Eduskunta (Parliament of Finland). (in Finnish)
- KASNTn NKVDn vuosina 1937 - 1938 rankaisemien Suomen Eduskunnan entisten jäsenten luettelo
