= Lauri Letonmäki =

Finnish politician (1886–1935)

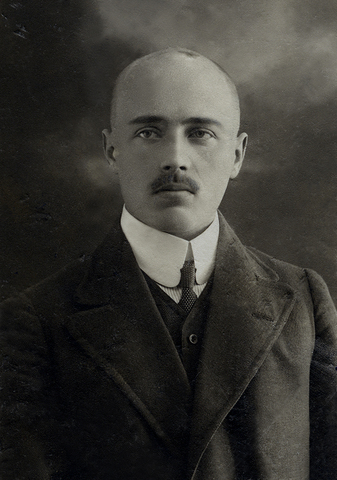
- Letonmäki in the 1910s

Commissioner for Justice of the Finnish People's Delegation of the Finnish Socialist Workers' Republic
- In office 29 January 1918 – 12 April 1918 Serving with Antti Kiviranta

Commissioner for Maintenance of the Finnish People's Delegation of the Finnish Socialist Workers' Republic
- In office 13 April 1918 – 5 May 1918

Member of the Finnish Parliament
- In office 2 February 1914 – 3 April 1917
- Constituency: Vaasa Province East

Personal details
- Born: Lauri Aukusti Helin; 22 December 1886 Tampere, Grand Duchy of Finland
- Died: 22 November 1935 (aged 48) Petrozavodsk, Karelian ASSR, USSR
- Party: SDP (1905-1918); SKP (1918-1935)
- Spouse: Maria Kurkela (m. 1910)
- Children: 2

Lauri Aukusti Letonmäki (22 December 1886 – 20 November 1935) was a Finnish journalist, teacher, and politician. Born in Tampere, he was a member of the Parliament of Finland from 1914 to 1916. In 1918, during the Finnish Civil War, Letonmäki was Commissioner for Justice in the Finnish People's Delegation, the government of the Finnish Socialist Workers' Republic. After the Red side lost the war, Letonmäki fled to Soviet Russia, where he was among the founders of the Communist Party of Finland (SKP). He committed suicide by hanging in 1935.
