= Salomo Savolainen =

Finnish politician (1883–1964)

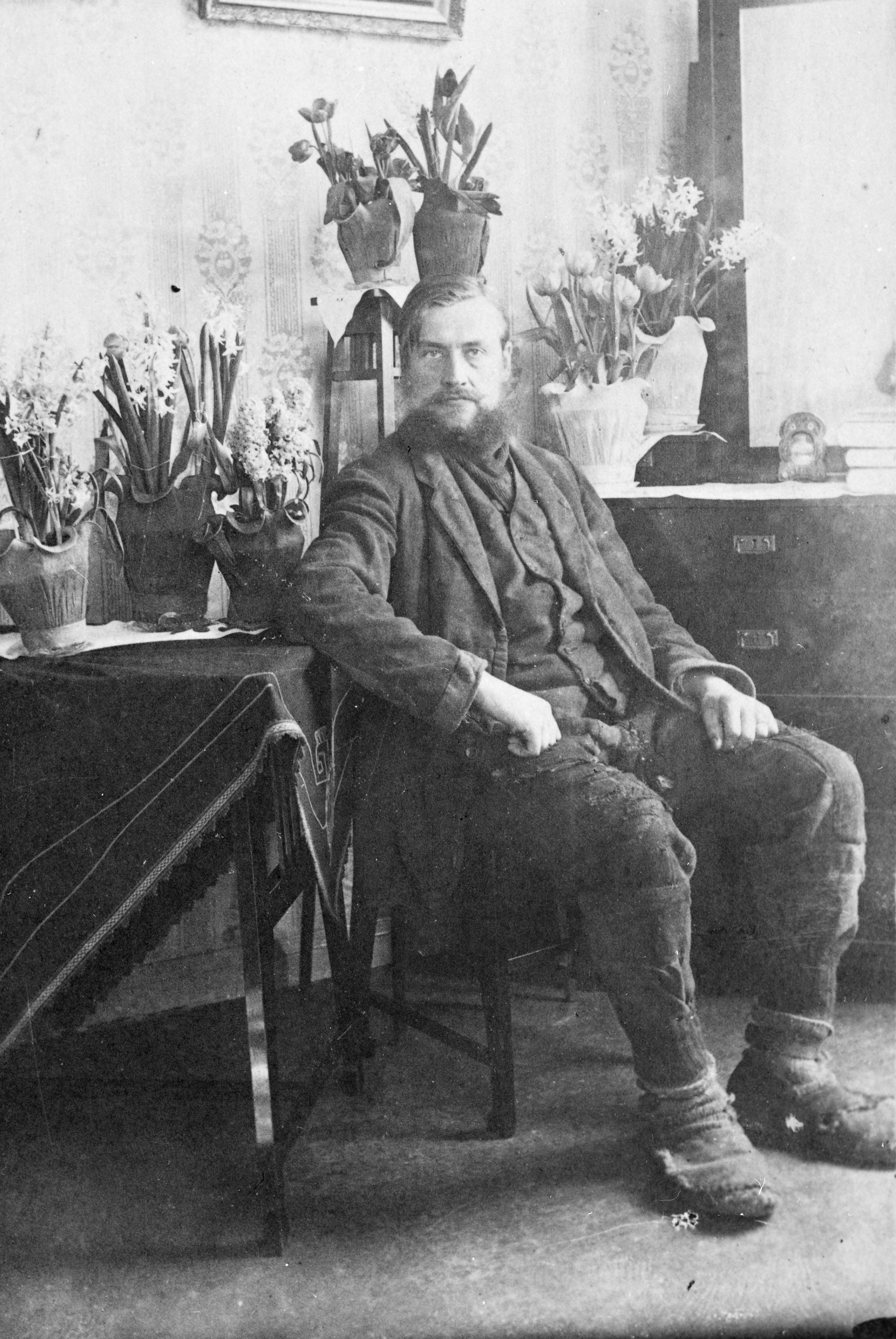
Salomo Savolainen after release from imprisonment in 1918.

Salomo Savolainen (30 September 1883, Maaninka - 9 June 1964) was a Finnish salesperson, warehouse manager and politician. He was imprisoned from 1918 to 1921 for having sided with the Reds during the Finnish Civil War. He was a member of the Parliament of Finland from 1927 to 1929, representing the Socialist Electoral Organisation of Workers and Smallholders (STPV).
