= Journal of Cellular Biochemistry =

- Discipline: Cell biology, biochemistry
- Language: English

Publication details
- History: Journal of Supramolecular Structure (1972–1980); Journal of Supramolecular Structure and Cellular Biochemistry (1981), Journal of Cellular Biochemistry (1982–present)
- Publisher: Wiley-Liss (United States)
- Frequency: 18/year
- Impact factor: 4.48 (2021)

Standard abbreviations
- ISO 4: J. Cell. Biochem.

Indexing
- CODEN: JCEBD5
- ISSN: 0730-2312 (print); 1097-4644 (web)
- LCCN: 82643293
- OCLC no.: 7980584
- ISSN: 0733-1959

Links
- Journal homepage; RSS

The Journal of Cellular Biochemistry publishes descriptions of original research in which complex cellular, pathogenic, clinical, or animal model systems are studied by biochemical, molecular, genetic, epigenetic, or quantitative ultrastructural approaches.

== History ==
The journal was previously called the Journal of Supramolecular Structure (1972–1980) and the Journal of Supramolecular Structure and Cellular Biochemistry (1981).

== Abstracting and indexing ==
The Journal of Cellular Biochemistry is indexed and/or abstracted in the following databases: BIOBASE, Biochemistry and Biophysics Citation Index, Biological Abstracts, BIOSIS Previews, CAB Abstracts, Cambridge Scientific Abstracts, Chemical Abstracts Service/SciFinder, CSA Biological Sciences Database, Current Awareness in Biological Sciences, Current Contents/Life Sciences, EMBASE, EORTC Database, Index Medicus/MEDLINE/PubMed, Reference Update, Science Citation Index, and Scopus.
