= Hatsina =

Village in the Southern Region of Eritrea

- Village
- Location in Eritrea
- Coordinates: 14°54′05″N 38°37′05″E

Hatsina is a village in the Southern Region of Eritrea and has an elevation of 1,958 metres. Hatsina is situated east of Adi Beyani.
