= Antti Savolainen =

Finnish ice hockey defenceman

- Born: February 26, 1988 (age 37); Tampere, Finland
- Height: 5 ft 10 in (178 cm)
- Weight: 190 lb (86 kg; 13 st 8 lb)
- Position: Defence
- Shot: Left
- Played for: Ilves
- Playing career: 2007–2012

Antti Savolainen (born February 26, 1988) is a Finnish former ice hockey defenceman.

Savolainen began his career at Ilves, making his debut for the senior team during the 2006–07 SM-liiga season. He played nine games that season and scored one goal and one assist. He then played in two playoff games during the 2007–08 SM-liiga season.

On April 30, 2009, Savolainen signed with Hokki of Mestis and played with the team until 2012.
