= Oskar Nissinen =

Finnish land surveyor, farmer and politician

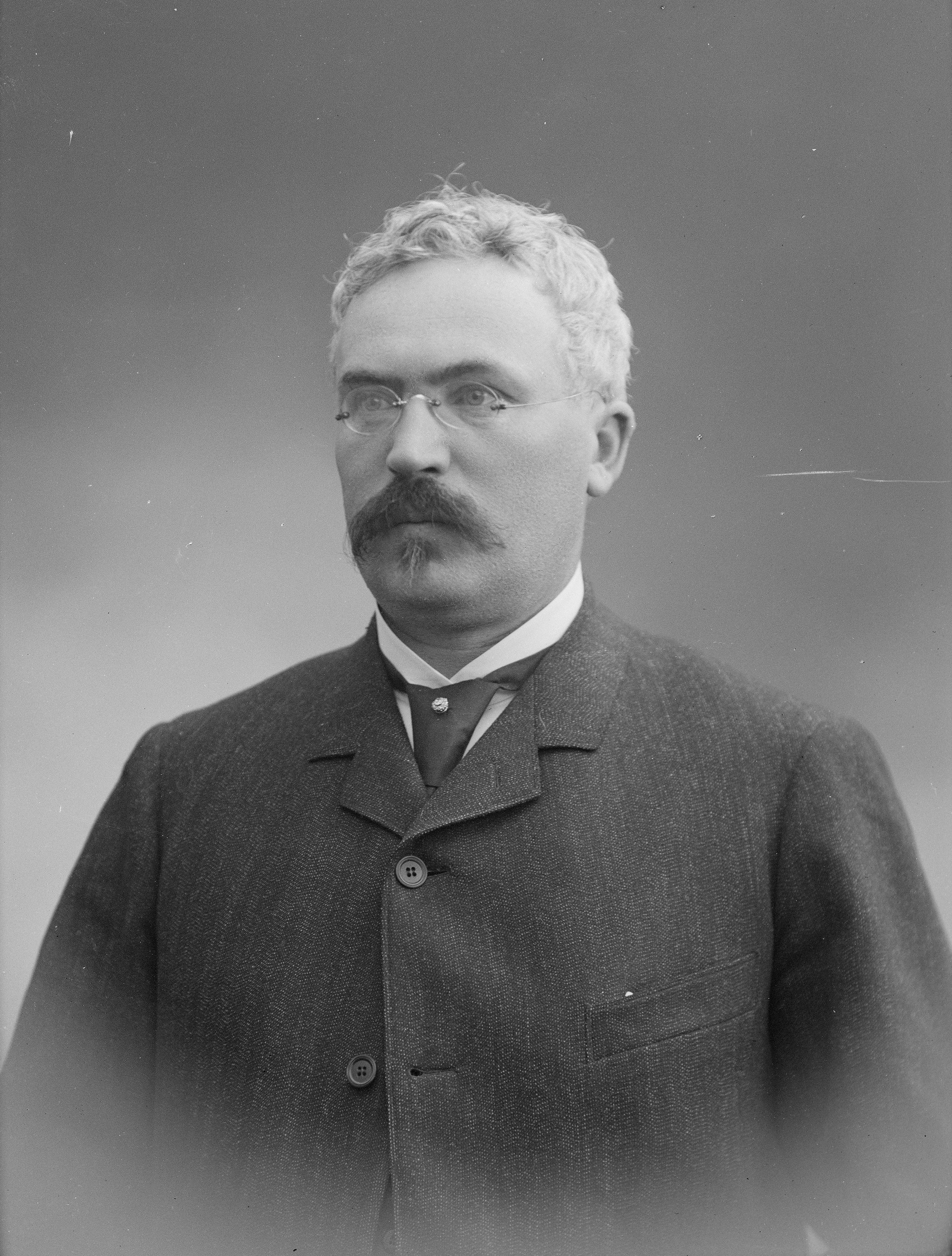

Oskar Petrus Nissinen (26 July 1864, Sortavala – 27 March 1937) was a Finnish land surveyor, farmer and politician. He was a Member of the Diet of Finland from 1900 to 1906 and a Member of the Parliament of Finland from 1917 to 1919, representing the Young Finnish Party until 1918 and the National Coalition Party from 1918 to 1919.
