= Farah Lubin =

American neuroscientist

Farah D. Lubin
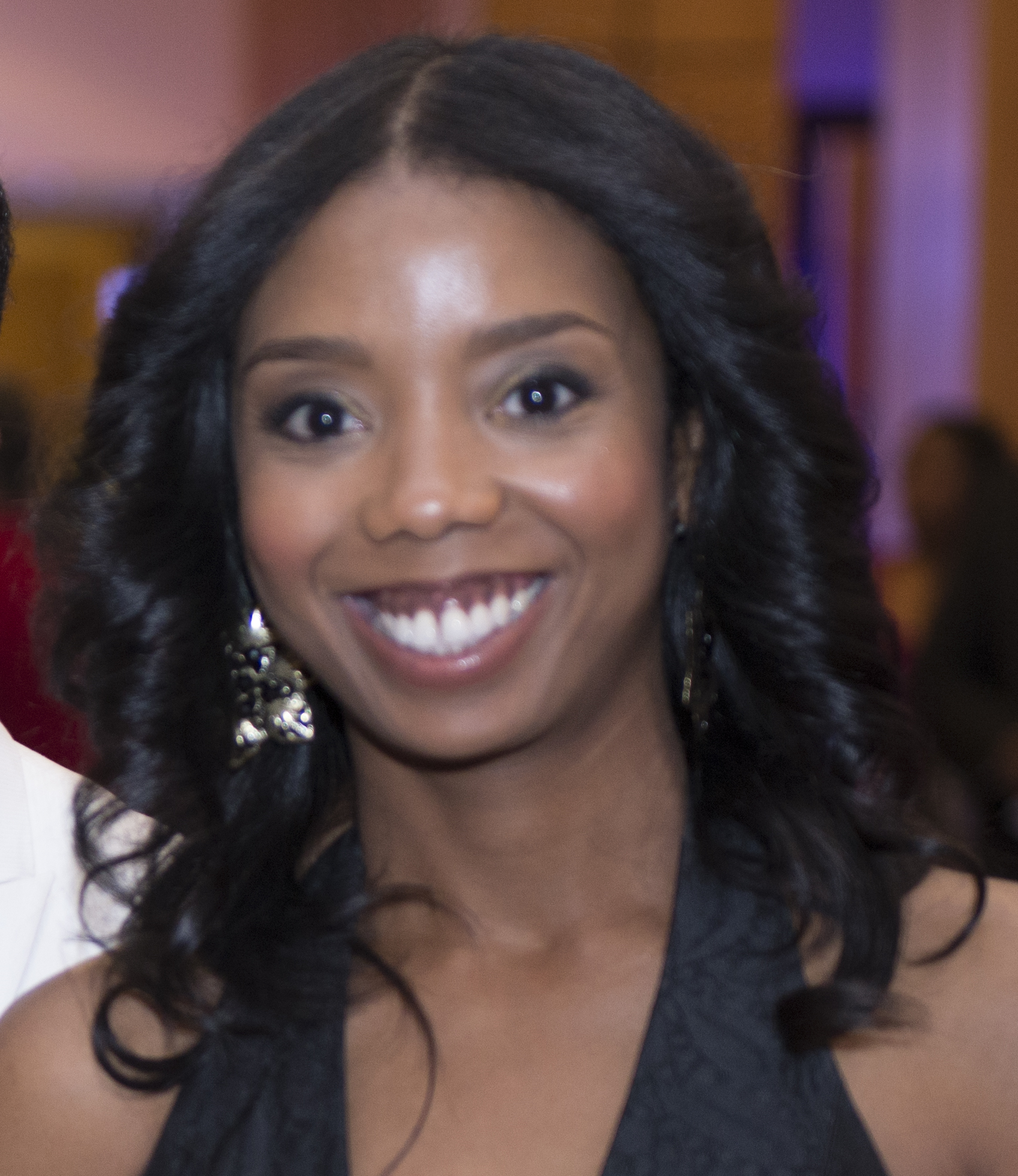
- Born: Haiti
- Education: Alabama State University; Binghamton University; Baylor College of Medicine
- Known for: Role of epigenetic modifications in memory
- Awards: 2025 Heersink School of Medicine Dean's Excellence Award for Mentorship, 2022 Commission on the Status of Women Padma Award, Becky Trigg Outstanding UAB Faculty Member, 2020 Dean's Excellence Award Winner in Diversity, 2020 President's Champion Award for Diversity, 2017 Dean’s Excellence in Mentorship Award, 2008 FASEB Professional Development and Enrichment Award
- Scientific career
- Fields: Neuroscience, epigenetics
- Workplaces: University of Alabama Birmingham

Farah D. Lubin is an American neuroscientist and Professor of Neurobiology and Cell, Developmental, and Integrative Biology at the University of Alabama at Birmingham within the Heersink School of Medicine. Lubin is the Principal Investigator of the Lubin Lab which explores the epigenetic mechanisms underlying cognition and how these mechanisms are altered in disease states such as epilepsy and neurodegeneration. Lubin discovered the role of NF-κB in fear memory reconsolidation and also uncovered a novel role for epigenetic regulation of BDNF during long-term memory formation and in epilepsy leading to memory loss. Lubin is a champion for diversity at UAB as the Director of the Roadmap Scholar Program and as a faculty mentor for several institutional and national programs to increase retention of underrepresented minorities in STEM.

== Early life and education ==
Lubin grew up in New York and attended high school in New York City. While in high school, she worked as a nursing assistant in New York City during the height of the HIV/AIDS epidemic. At the time she had a desire to pursue a career in medicine, but her experience in the clinic showed her that academia and science are where cures are discovered. Before completing high school, Lubin toured many American Historically Black Colleges and Universities and became acutely aware of the barriers to career success due to her identity as a Black woman in science. Motivated to overcome these barriers, Lubin pursued her undergraduate degree at Alabama State University in 1992. She received a full scholarship and participated in the National Institutes of Health sponsored Minority Biomedical Research Support Program. Her summer research experience at the Memorial Sloan Kettering Cancer Center in New York City highlighted her passion for scientific discovery and she chose to pursue a career and academia.

In 1996, Lubin obtained her Bachelors of Science in biology with a Minor in Chemistry from Alabama State University, graduating summa cum laude with honors for her senior research thesis in the lab of Eddie Moore. Lubin then returned to New York State to join the Cell and Molecular Biology Graduate Program at Binghamton University (SUNY). She trained under the mentorship of Dennis W. McGee exploring cytokine signalling in epithelial cells. Lubin inhibited integrin signalling in epithelial cells and exposed them to proinflammatory cytokines. She found that a3B1 integrin signalling may be responsible for suppression of cytokine responses in epithelial cells during inflammation and wound healing.

After completing her graduate training in 2001, Lubin pursued postdoctoral training at Baylor College of Medicine in the Texas Children's Hospital under the mentorship of Anne E. Anderson. Lubin explored how glutamate signalling is coupled to nuclear factor-kappa B expression and transcriptional regulation in the hippocampus. She found that kainate, a glutamate analog, elicited activation of NF-κB via the classical IkB kinase pathway and both ERK and PI3K were implicated in regulation of transcription via NF-κB in hippocampal area CA3.

In 2006, Lubin pursued further postdoctoral training in the lab of David Sweatt at Baylor College of Medicine. Lubin moved with the lab to the University of Alabama at Birmingham and continued her postdoctoral training there. During this second phase of her postdoctoral training, Lubin explored epigenetic transcriptional regulation of fear memory reconsolidation. She found that fear memory retrieval activates the NK-kB signalling pathway and leads to epigenetic modifications of the gene promoters in the hippocampus via IKKa-mediated mechanisms. Lubin then discovered a role for epigenetic modifications of the bdnf gene in fear memory consolidation. She found that bdnf DNA methylation altered bdnf transcription and that blocking BDNF expression in the hippocampus resulted in impaired fear memory consolidation. Upon completion of her postdoctoral fellowship, Lubin became one of the first UAB scientists to obtain a K99 NIH grant to support her transition into her independent career.

== Career and research ==
In 2009, Lubin became an Assistant Professor of Neurobiology at the University of Alabama at Birmingham as well as an Investigator in the Evelyn McKnight Brain Institute and an assistant professor in the Department of Cell Biology. She was then promoted to Associate Professor and now holds appointments in the Comprehensive Center for Healthy Aging, the Comprehensive Neuroscience Center, the Center for Glial Biology and Medicine, the Center for Neurodegeneration and Experimental Therapeutics, the Civitan International Research Center, and the Center for Craniofacial, Oral, and Dental Disorders. Lubin is also actively involved in recruitment as well as continued support of the academic and medical trainees at UAB. In 2017, Lubin became co-director of Research Training for the NIH/NINDS Mentored Experiences in Research Instruction, and Teaching (MERIT) Program which supports postdoctoral fellows at UAB in achieving their career goals. Lubin also serves on the admissions committee for the graduate program in Neuroscience and is a member of the advisory board for the Medical Scientists Training Program.

Lubin is also the Principal Investigator of the Lubin Lab where she leads a research program centered around exploring the molecular and cellular mechanisms of epigenetic modifications that mediate cognition and that become aberrant in disease processes such as epilepsy and memory disorders. She has found that transcription implicated in memory formation is tightly regulated by DNA methylation in the hippocampus.

=== Histone methylation in memory consolidation ===
Lubin is a pioneer in the study of histone modifications in cognition. Early in her independent career she explored the role of histone methylation in memory formation. She found that histone methylation is actively regulated in the adult hippocampus and that methylation is required for the long-term consolidation of fear memories. In 2012, Lubin and her team discovered the critical role for GLP lysine dimethyltransferase complex mediated lysination and methylation in both the hippocampus and the entorhinal cortex during memory consolidation.

=== Histone hydroxymethylation in memory consolidation ===
Lubin and her group then explored the role of epigenetic methylation in the retrieval of memories. She found that retrieval of fear memories increased the levels of H3K4me and 5hmC methylation in the dorsal hippocampus. Her findings supported the link between methylation and hydroxymethylation in gene transcription associated with memory retrieval in the hippocampus.

=== Memory loss in epilepsy ===
In 2015, Lubin and her team discovered a role for DNA methylation in the memory loss associated with epilepsy. They detected aberrant DNA methylation patterns at the bdnf gene in rat models of epilepsy and investigated how these might be impacting memory formation. They found that epilepsy decreased DNA methylation of the bdnf gene leading to increased levels of BDNF which impaired memory consolidation. When they artificially increased the methylation at the bdnf gene, this led to improvements in memory in epileptic animals.

=== Advocacy ===
Lubin is a fervent advocate for diversity in STEM and has dedicated herself to enhancing diversity and opportunities for underrepresented minority students to excel in STEM at the University of Alabama. In 2014, Lubin helped to establish the NIH/NINDS Roadmap Scholar Program for graduate students in neuroscience at UAB. Lubin is now the co-director of the program. In this role, Lubin oversees and coordinates graduate student mentoring, social and networking events, workshops and other initiatives to support underrepresented graduate students in neuroscience. She serves as a faculty mentor in the program to guide students to career success in neuroscience and she also co-organizes the yearly NEURAL Conference to bring together underrepresented minority students from across the country to share their research and scientific accomplishments. Lubin is also a mentor for the UAB Society for Advancement of Chicanos/Hispanics and Native Americans in Science Chapter. Her support of underrepresented junior faculty and postdoctoral fellows at UAB is felt through her involvement in the Health Disparities Research Education Program as a Grant Reviewer.

== Awards and honors ==
- 2020 Dean's Excellence Award Winner in Diversity
- 2020 UAB President's Champion Award Winner in Diversity
- 2017 Dean's Excellence in Mentorship Award
- 2012 Health Services Foundation Award
- 2010-2011 McNulty Civitan Scientist
- 2008 FASEB Professional Development and Enrichment Award
- 2004 American Epilepsy Society and Milken Family Foundation Announce Epilepsy Award Recipient

== Select publications ==
- Sint Jago SC, Lubin FD. 2020 Epigenetic Therapeutic Intervention for a Rare Epilepsy Disorder. Epilepsy Currents. 1535759720904162. PMID 32064921 DOI: 10.1177/1535759720904162
- Webb WM, Irwin AB, Pepin ME, Henderson BW, Huang V, Butler AA, Herskowitz JH, Wende AR, Cash AE, Lubin FD. 2019. The SETD6 Methyltransferase Plays an Essential Role in Hippocampus-Dependent Memory Formation. Biological Psychiatry. PMID 31378303 DOI: 10.1016/j.biopsych.2019.05.022
- Huang V, Butler AA, Lubin FD. 2019. Telencephalon transcriptome analysis of chronically stressed adult zebrafish. Scientific Reports. 9: 1379. PMID 30718621 DOI: 10.1038/s41598-018-37761-7
- Jarome TJ, Perez GA, Hauser RM, Hatch KM, Lubin FD. 2018. EZH2 Methyltransferase Activity Controls Pten Expression and mTOR Signaling During Fear Memory Reconsolidation. The Journal of Neuroscience : the Official Journal of the Society For Neuroscience. PMID 30030400 DOI: 10.1523/JNEUROSCI.0538-18.2018
- Webb WM, Sanchez RG, Perez G, Butler AA, Hauser RM, Rich MC, O'Bierne AL, Jarome TJ, Lubin FD. 2017. Dynamic association of epigenetic H3K4me3 and DNA 5hmC marks in the dorsal hippocampus and anterior cingulate cortex following reactivation of a fear memory. Neurobiology of Learning and Memory. PMID 28232238 DOI: 10.1016/j.nlm.2017.02.010
- Jarome TJ, Butler AA, Nichols JN, Pacheco NL, Lubin FD. 2015. NF-κB mediates Gadd45β expression and DNA demethylation in the hippocampus during fear memory formation. Frontiers in Molecular Neuroscience. 8: 54. PMID 26441517 DOI: 10.3389/fnmol.2015.00054
- Parrish RR, Buckingham SC, Mascia KL, Johnson JJ, Matyjasik MM, Lockhart RM, Lubin FD. 2015. Methionine increases BDNF DNA methylation and improves memory in epilepsy. Annals of Clinical and Translational Neurology. 2: 401–16. PMID 25909085 DOI: 10.1002/acn3.183
- Ryley Parrish R, Albertson AJ, Buckingham SC, Hablitz JJ, Mascia KL, Davis Haselden W, Lubin FD. 2013. Status epilepticus triggers early and late alterations in brain-derived neurotrophic factor and NMDA glutamate receptor Grin2b DNA methylation levels in the hippocampus. Neuroscience. 248: 602–19. PMID 23811393 DOI: 10.1016/j.neuroscience.2013.06.029
- Lubin FD, Gupta S, Parrish RR, Grissom NM, Davis RL. 2011. Epigenetic Mechanisms: Critical Contributors to Long-Term Memory Formation. The Neuroscientist : a Review Journal Bringing Neurobiology, Neurology and Psychiatry. PMID 21460188 DOI: 10.1177/1073858410386967
- Lubin FD, Roth TL, Sweatt JD. 2008. Epigenetic regulation of BDNF gene transcription in the consolidation of fear memory. The Journal of Neuroscience : the Official Journal of the Society For Neuroscience. 28: 10576–86. PMID 18923034 DOI: 10.1523/JNEUROSCI.1786-08.2008
- Lubin FD, Sweatt JD. 2007. The IkappaB kinase regulates chromatin structure during reconsolidation of conditioned fear memories. Neuron. 55: 942–57. PMID 17880897 DOI: 10.1016/j.neuron.2007.07.039
- Lubin FD, Segal M, McGee DW. 2003. Regulation of epithelial cell cytokine responses by the alpha3beta1 integrin. Immunology. 108: 204–10. PMID 12562329 DOI: 10.1046/j.1365-2567.2003.01577.x
