= Jussi Rainio =

Finnish politician and journalist (1878–1918)

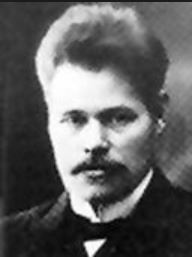
Jussi Rainio

Jussi Rainio (5 April 1878, Maaria – 10 May 1918, Pori) was a Finnish journalist and politician. He was a member of the Parliament of Finland from 1911 to 1913, representing the Social Democratic Party of Finland. After the 1918 Finnish Civil War, he was arrested by the Whites and murdered in the jail cell of the Pori Old Town Hall in May 1918.

His sister Aino Forsten was also a member of the Parliament of Finland. She was later executed in the Soviet Union in 1937.
