= Tatu Nissinen =

Finnish politician

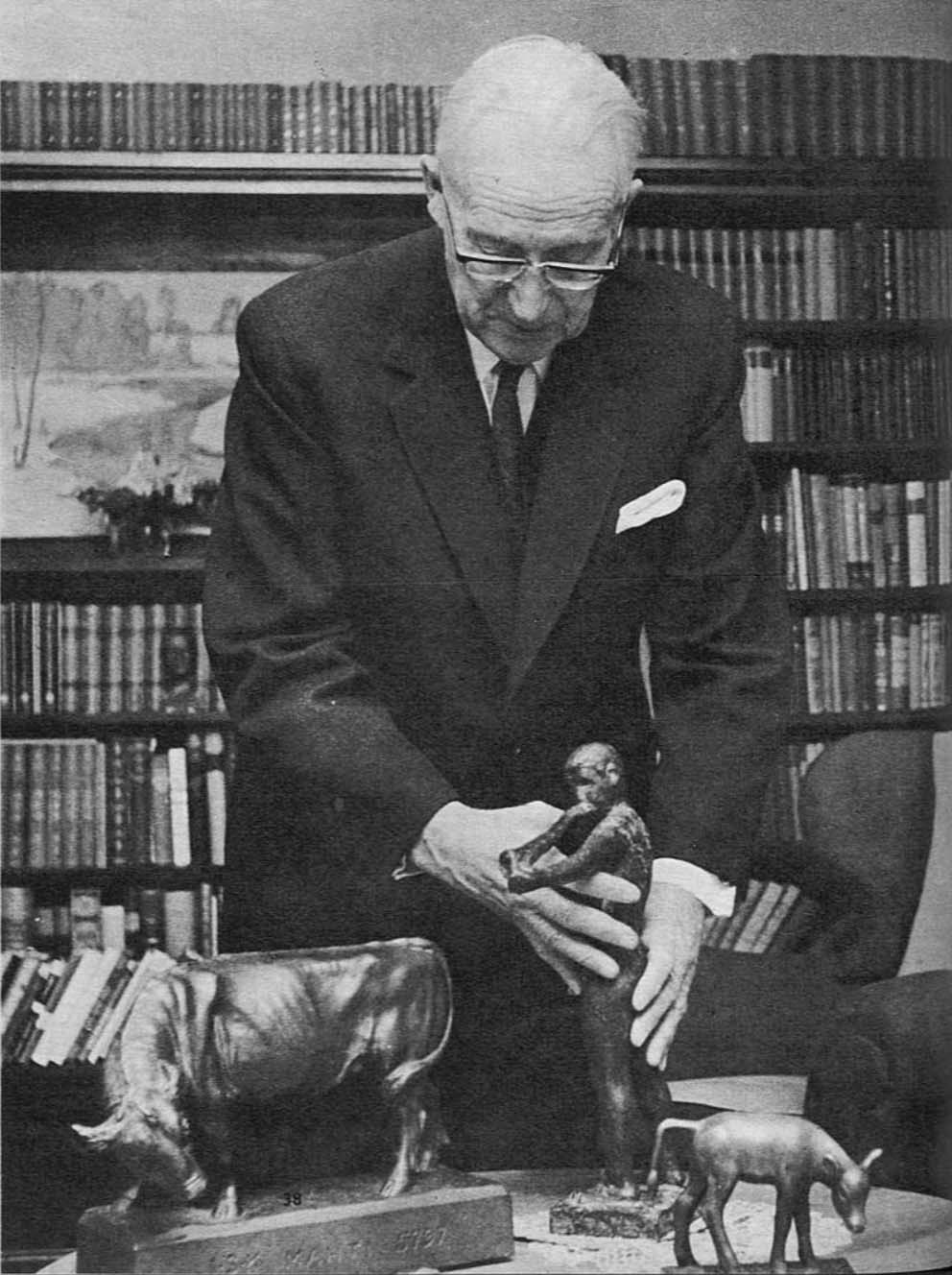
Tatu Nissinen, 1963

David (Tatu) Nissinen (22 August 1883 – 2 February 1966) was a Finnish agronomist and politician, born in Maaninka. He was a member of the Parliament of Finland from 1920 to 1922, representing the National Progressive Party.
