= Joni Seinelä =

Finnish ice hockey player

- Born: March 23, 1993 (age 32) Turku, Finland
- Height: 6 ft 0 in (183 cm)
- Weight: 174 lb (79 kg; 12 st 6 lb)
- Position: Right wing
- Shoots: Left
- SM-liiga team: HC TPS
- Playing career: 2012–present

Joni Seinelä (born March 23, 1993) is a Finnish ice hockey player. His is currently playing with HC TPS in the Finnish SM-liiga.

Seinelä made his SM-liiga debut playing with HC TPS during the 2011–12 SM-liiga season.
