= Valfrid Perttilä =

Finnish politician (1878–1953)

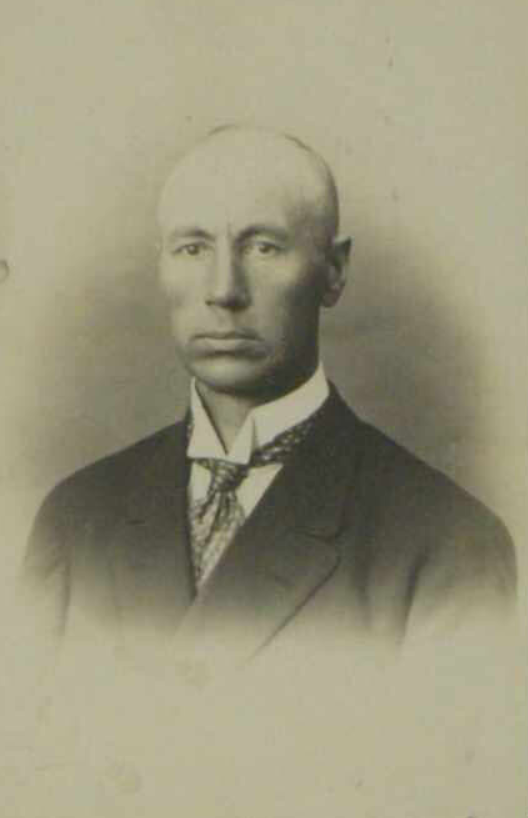
- Valfrid Perttilä in Sweden 1918

Member of the Finnish Parliament for Uusimaa, Häme
- In office 22 May 1907 – 31 May 1909
- In office 1 March 1910 – 1 February 1914
- In office 4 April 1917 – 31 October 1917

Personal details
- Born: 23 September 1878 Isokyrö, Grand Duchy of Finland
- Died: 17 August 1953 (aged 74) Kondopoga, Soviet Union
- Party: Social Democratic

Valfrid Perttilä (23 September 1878 – 17 August 1953) was a Finnish politician and trade unionist. He was a member of the Parliament of Finland 1907–1914 and 1917 representing the Social Democratic Party. During the 1918 Civil War of Finland, Perttilä was the chairman of the Central Workers' Council of Finland.

== Life ==
Perttilä lived in Helsinki as a factory worker since 1893 and joined the Social Democratic Party in 1899. During the 1905 General Strike, Perttilä was a member of the Helsinki General Strike Committee. In 1907, he was elected to the Parliament of Finland. In 1916, Perttilä was one of the founders of the Finnish Seafarers' Union.

During the 1918 Civil War, Perttilä was the chairman of the Central Workers' Council, the legislature of the Red Finland. As the Red power collapsed, Perttilä fled to the Soviet Russia. In August 1918, he took part on the founding congress of the exile Communist Party of Finland in Moscow. In December 1918, Perttilä moved to Sweden as a political refugee. He stayed in Stockholm until 1920 working as a representative of the Communist Party of Finland.

After returning Russia, Perttilä lived in Leningrad and worked for the publishing company Kirja and the Finnish-language newspaper Vapaus (″Freedom″). His wife Augusta Påhlsson (1887–1937) and son Yrjö Mauno Perttilä (1910–1938), who served as an officer in the Baltic Fleet, were killed in the Great Purge. Perttilä spent his last years in Soviet Karelia in Kondopoga where he died in 1953.

Valfrid Perttilä was the stepbrother of the politician Emil Perttilä.
