= Aino Forsten =

Finnish politician and educator (1885–1937)

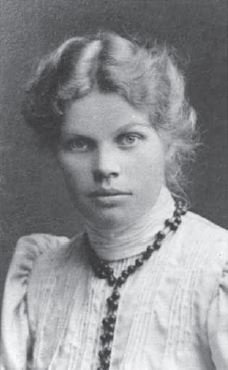
- Aino Forsten during the 1910s

Member of Finnish Parliament
- In office 4 April 1917 – 16 May 1918
- Constituency: Turku Province North

Personal details
- Born: 2 April 1885 Maaria, Grand Duchy of Finland, Russian Empire
- Died: 27 November 1937 (aged 52) Petrozavodsk, Karelian ASSR, USSR
- Party: Social Democratic Party
- Occupation: politician, educator

Aina "Aino" Aleksandra Forsten, née Rainio (2 April 1885 – 27 November 1937), was a Finnish politician and educator. She was a member of the Parliament of Finland for the Social Democratic Party from 1916 to 1918. After the 1918 Finnish Civil War, Forsten fled to the Soviet Union where she was executed during the Great Purge in 1937.

== Life ==
=== Early years ===
Forsten was born in a poor peasant family in the Southwest Finland municipality of Maaria. After primary school, she lived in Turku and joined the Social Democratic Party in 1904. Two years later Forsten moved to Pori, where her brother Jussi Rainio was a newspaperman for the local labour press. Forsten first worked as a saleswoman, but was soon hired as an agitator for the Social Democrats. She became one of the leading socialists in the Pori area, and was best known of her work for the labour women and their families. In 1909 Forsten married the mail carrier Kaarlo Verner Forsten (1885–1956), who was also a member of the Social Democratic Party.

=== The Civil War and life in the Soviet Union ===
Forsten was elected to the Parliament of Finland in the 1917 election from the electoral district of Satakunta. During the 1918 Civil War, Forsten was a member of the Central Workers' Council of Finland. Her husband stayed in Pori as one of the local Red Guard leaders. After the war, the Whites started executing the Red leaders and the Forsten family decided to flee to Soviet Russia. In July 1918, they settled in Saint Petersburg, where Forsten worked as an accountant for the Communist Party of Finland. The party was established by the Red refugees in Moscow in August 1918.

In 1920 Aino and Verner Forsten moved to Soviet Karelia. Aino Forsten worked as an adult educator in Petrozavodsk and Kalevala and later as the head of the Petrozavodsk Finnish school for girls in 1930–1936. Verner Forsten was the Vice-Minister of Economy of the Karelian Autonomous Soviet Socialist Republic and the chairman of the Kalevala County Council.

== Death ==
Aino and Verner Forsten were arrested during the Great Purge in July 1937, accused of counter-revolutionary nationalist action. Verner Forsten was sentenced to 8 years of forced labour, but Aino Forsten received a death sentence in November 1937 and was immediately executed. Her husband survived the Siberian labour camps and was released from Krasnoyarsk in 1946. Verner Forsten was rehabilitated after Stalin's death in 1955.
