= Joni Liljeblad =

Finnish ice hockey player

- Born: 17 September 1989 (age 35); Oulu, Finland
- Height: 6 ft 0 in (183 cm)
- Weight: 176 lb (80 kg; 12 st 8 lb)
- Position: Defence
- Shoots: Left
- SM-liiga team: Kärpät
- NHL draft: Undrafted
- Playing career: 2010–present

Joni Liljeblad (born 17 September 1989) is a Finnish professional ice hockey player who played with Kärpät in the SM-liiga during the 2010–11 season.
