= Joni Nissinen =

Finnish footballer (born 1991)

Personal information
- Date of birth: 21 April 1991 (age 35)
- Place of birth: Kuopio, Finland
- Height: 1.79 m (5 ft 10 1/2 in)
- Position: Defender

Youth career
- KuPS

Senior career*
Years	Team	Apps	(Gls)
2008–	KuPS	26	(0)

International career^{‡}
	Finland U-17	9	(?)
	Finland U-18	16	(?)
	Finland U-19	5	(?)
- * Club domestic league appearances and goals as of 4 August 2012 ‡ National team caps and goals as of 22 September 2011

Joni Nissinen (born 21 April 1991) is a Finnish footballer currently playing for the Finnish Veikkausliiga club KuPS. He primarily played as a right-back, standing 178 cm tall and weighing 68 kg.

== Club career and statistics ==
Nissinen played for KuPS from 2009 to 2013, featuring in numerous matches, and was a key figure in the defensive line. He was mainly noted for his defensive contributions rather than scoring goals. He featured regularly in Veikkausliiga and had brief international experience via European competitions.
