= National Center for Advancing Translational Sciences =

U.S. health institute

National Center for Advancing Translational Sciences (NCATS)
- Abbreviation: NCATS
- Formation: December 23, 2011
- Type: U.S. government agency
- Legal status: Active
- Headquarters: Bethesda, Maryland, US
- Director: Joni L. Rutter
- Parent organization: National Institutes of Health
- Affiliations: United States Public Health Service
- Website: ncats.nih.gov

The National Center for Advancing Translational Sciences (NCATS) was established on December 23, 2011 and is located in Bethesda, Maryland. NCATS is one of 27 institutes and centers of the U.S. National Institutes of Health (NIH), an agency of the U.S. Department of Health and Human Services. The mission of NCATS is to transform scientific discoveries into new treatments and cures for disease that can be delivered faster to patients. The budget provided to NCATS for fiscal year 2018 is $557,373,000.

== History ==
NCATS was created on December 23, 2011 by the Consolidated Appropriations Act, 2012.

The center was created from a number of existing NIH programs:

- Clinical and Translational Science Award program
- Components of the Molecular Libraries Program
- Therapeutics for Rare and Neglected Diseases
- RAID renamed Bridging Interventional Development Gaps
- Office of Rare Diseases Research
- NIH–FDA Regulatory Science Initiative
- Cures Acceleration Network (CAN)

== Directors ==
Past directors 2011 – present

No.	Portrait	Director	Took office	Left office	Refs.
acting		Thomas R. Insel	December 23, 2011	September 22, 2012	
1		Christopher P. Austin	September 23, 2012	April 15, 2021	
acting		Joni L. Rutter	April 16, 2021	November 5, 2022	
2		Joni L. Rutter	November 6, 2022	Present	

== Divisions ==
NCATS is organized into a number of divisions:

- Division of Clinical Innovation
- Division of Pre-Clinical Innovation
- Office of Administrative Management
- Office of Grants Management and Scientific Review
- Office of Rare Diseases Research: Oversees the Rare Diseases Clinical Research Network and Genetic and Rare Diseases Information Center (GARD)
- Office of Strategic Alliances: Works with businesses in the biotech and pharmaceutical industry to speed the development of new drugs

== Programs and initiatives ==
=== Overview ===
The stated goal of NCATS is to promote research in both existing and new areas of medicine and science, in order to promote public health and to overcome high failure rates in clinical trials. To accomplish this, NCATS supports 31 programs and initiatives that relate to translational research and improving the speed of therapeutic development. The 31 programs and initiatives involve a range of STEM-related fields including biology, biochemistry, chemistry, bioengineering, virology, genetics, and data science. Within the realm of translational science, issues that NCATS is particularly focused on addressing using its programs, initiatives, and partnerships include increasing the success and de-risking the costs associated with therapeutic development, incentivizing more collaborative work, and addressing data transparency issues.

=== COVID response ===
During the COVID-19 pandemic, NCATS launched an open data initiative to promote collaborative sharing of COVID-related drug data. An additional data sharing partnership with several other government institutes resulted in a study detailing the COVID-related risks for patients with chronic obstructive pulmonary disease.

== See also ==
- Translational research
