= Maria Letonmäki =

Finnish politician (1882–1937)

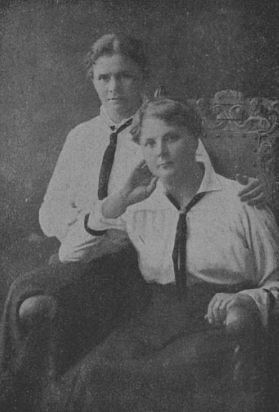
Maria Letonmäki (left) with Aino Takala in 1917

Maria (Maikki) Alina Letonmäki (2 November 1882 – 15 November 1937; née Kurkela; name as Soviet citizen Мария Эммануиловна Летонмяки) was a Finnish politician, born in Keuruu. She was a member of the Parliament of Finland from 1916 to 1917, representing the Social Democratic Party of Finland (SDP). During the Finnish Civil War of 1918, she worked in the administration of the Finnish Socialist Workers' Republic. After the defeat of the Red side, she went into exile in Soviet Russia. She joined the Communist Party of Finland (SKP) and the Communist Party of the Soviet Union. On 2 July 1937, during the Great Purge, she was arrested as suspected of counterrevolutionary activities, sentenced to death and shot in Petrozavodsk on 15 November 1937. Posthumously rehabilitated on 9 August 1956.

Letonmäki was married to Finnish journalist, teacher, and politician Lauri Letonmäki.
