= Embassy of Finland, Lima =

Diplomatic mission of Finland (and formerly Sweden) in Peru

Embassy of Finland in Peru
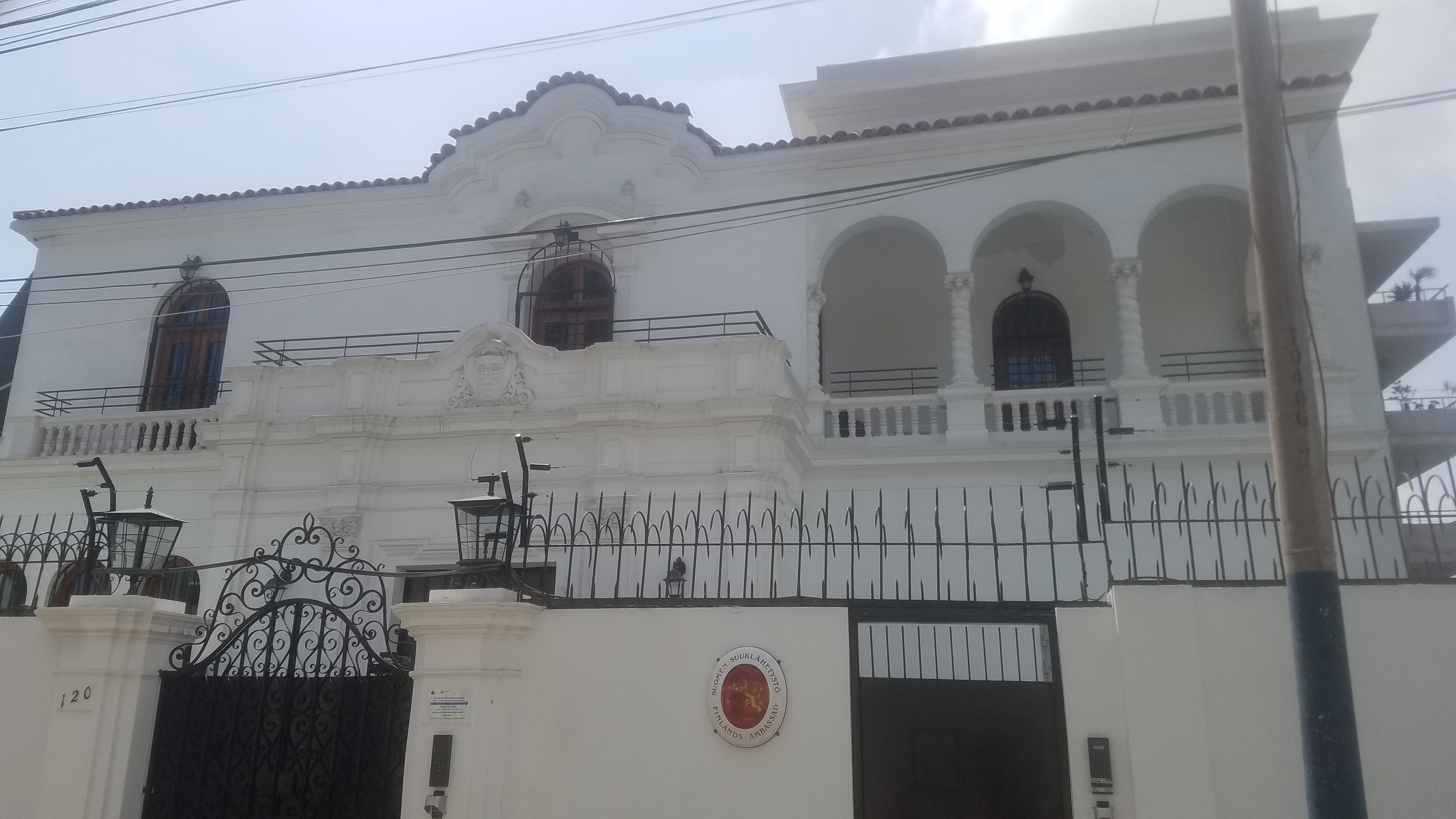
- The embassy in 2023
- Location: San Isidro, Lima, Peru
- Address: Calle La Santa María 120 (Cdra. 6 Av. Conquistadores)
- Opened: 1982
- Jurisdiction: Peru; Bolivia; Ecuador
- Website: Website (in Finnish)

Cultural Heritage of Peru
- Designated: December 2, 1998
- Part of: El Olivar Monumental Zone
- Legal basis: R.D.N. Nº 410/INC

The Embassy of Finland in Lima (Finnish: Suomen suurlähetystö, Lima, Spanish: Embajada de Finlandia en Lima) is Finland's diplomatic mission in Peru, located in the country's capital, Lima, and also accredited to Bolivia and Ecuador.

Until August 2022, it also housed the Embassy of Sweden in Lima, also accredited to Bolivia from 1940 to 2001.

Besides the embassy, Finland also operates honorary consulates in Lima, Arequipa, Cuzco and Piura.

== History ==
=== Embassy of Sweden (1940–2022) ===
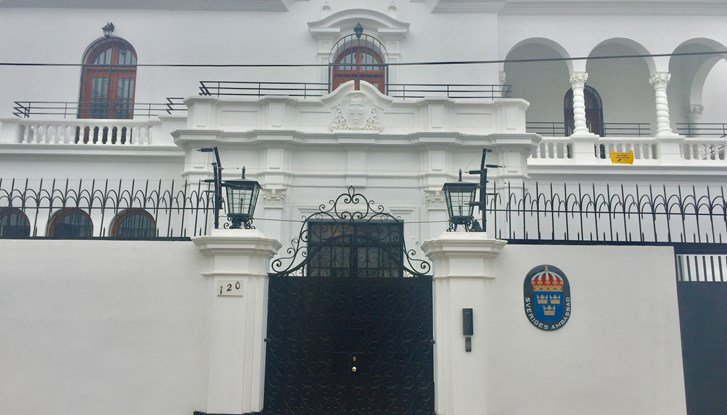
The then Swedish embassy in 2019

The Embassy of Sweden, Lima (Swedish: Sveriges ambassad i Lima, Spanish: Embajada de Suecia en Lima) was Sweden's diplomatic mission in Peru, being the original occupant of the building that currently houses the Finnish embassy. The final resident ambassador was Maria Cramér.

Diplomatic relations between Peru and Sweden were established in 1930. A palace-like villa built in 1938 was bought by the then National Swedish Board of Public Building (Byggnadsstyrelsen) in 1940 as an ambassador's residence. The embassy was closed in 2001, and the Swedish ambassador in Santiago de Chile became accredited to Lima from 2001 to 2016.

Following a government decision on 11 December 2015, the embassy reopened in 2016. The embassy was inaugurated on 22 November 2016 by EU and Trade Minister Ann Linde together with a Team Sweden delegation. The embassy closed again in August 2022.

=== Embassy of Finland (1963–present) ===
The Finnish embassy in Lima was opened for the first time on July 1, 1963. However, it was closed on September 1, 1991 due to the economic depression affecting the country at the time, as well as the Internal conflict in Peru. The embassy was reopened on February 1, 1998.

The former Swedish embassy now solely houses the diplomatic mission of Finland since 2022. In addition to the embassy, an ambassadorial residence was formerly operated in San Isidro, located at the address of Guillermo Marconi 270, between the embassies of North and South Korea.

== List of representatives ==
Appointment Accreditation	Name	Notes	Appointed by	Head of state of Peru	Term end
1963	Heikki Juhani Hannikainen	Resident in Caracas	Urho Kekkonen	Nicolás Lindley López	1967
1967	Karl Torsten Tikanvaara	Resident in Caracas	Urho Kekkonen	Nicolás Lindley López	1976
1976	Klaus Kristian Snellman	Resident in Caracas	Urho Kekkonen	Francisco Morales Bermúdez	1980
1980	Seppo Taito Pietinen		Urho Kekkonen	Fernando Belaúnde Terry	1983
1983	Brita Johanna Riitta Örö		Mauno Koivisto	Fernando Belaúnde Terry	1986
1986	Esko Antero Lipponen		Mauno Koivisto	Alán García Pérez	1991
1991	Pertti A.O. Kärkkäinen	Resident in Buenos Aires	Mauno Koivisto	Alberto Fujimori	1993
1993	Pekka J. Korvenheimo	Resident in Buenos Aires	Mauno Koivisto	Alberto Fujimori	1993
1993	Maija Lähteenmäki	Resident in Santiago de Chile	Mauno Koivisto	Alberto Fujimori	1995
1995	Risto Kauppi	Resident in Santiago de Chile	Martti Ahtisaari	Alberto Fujimori	1998
1998	Mikko Pyhälä		Martti Ahtisaari	Alberto Fujimori	2002
2002	Kimmo Pulkkinen		Tarja Halonen	Alejandro Toledo Manrique	2007
2007	Pekka Orpana		Tarja Halonen	Alan García	2011
2011	Juha Virtanen		Tarja Halonen	Ollanta Humala	2016
2016	Mika Koskinen		Sauli Niinistö	Ollanta Humala	2019
2019	Jukka Pietikäinen		Sauli Niinistö	Martín Vizcarra	2022
2022	Antti Rytövuori		Sauli Niinistö	Pedro Castillo	Incumbent

== See also ==
- Finland–Peru relations
- Embassy of Peru, Stockholm
- List of ambassadors of Peru to Finland
