= Alliance of Sahel States =

Confederation in West Africa

Alliance of Sahel States Alliance des États du Sahel (French)
- Flag Seal
- Anthem: Sahel Benkan
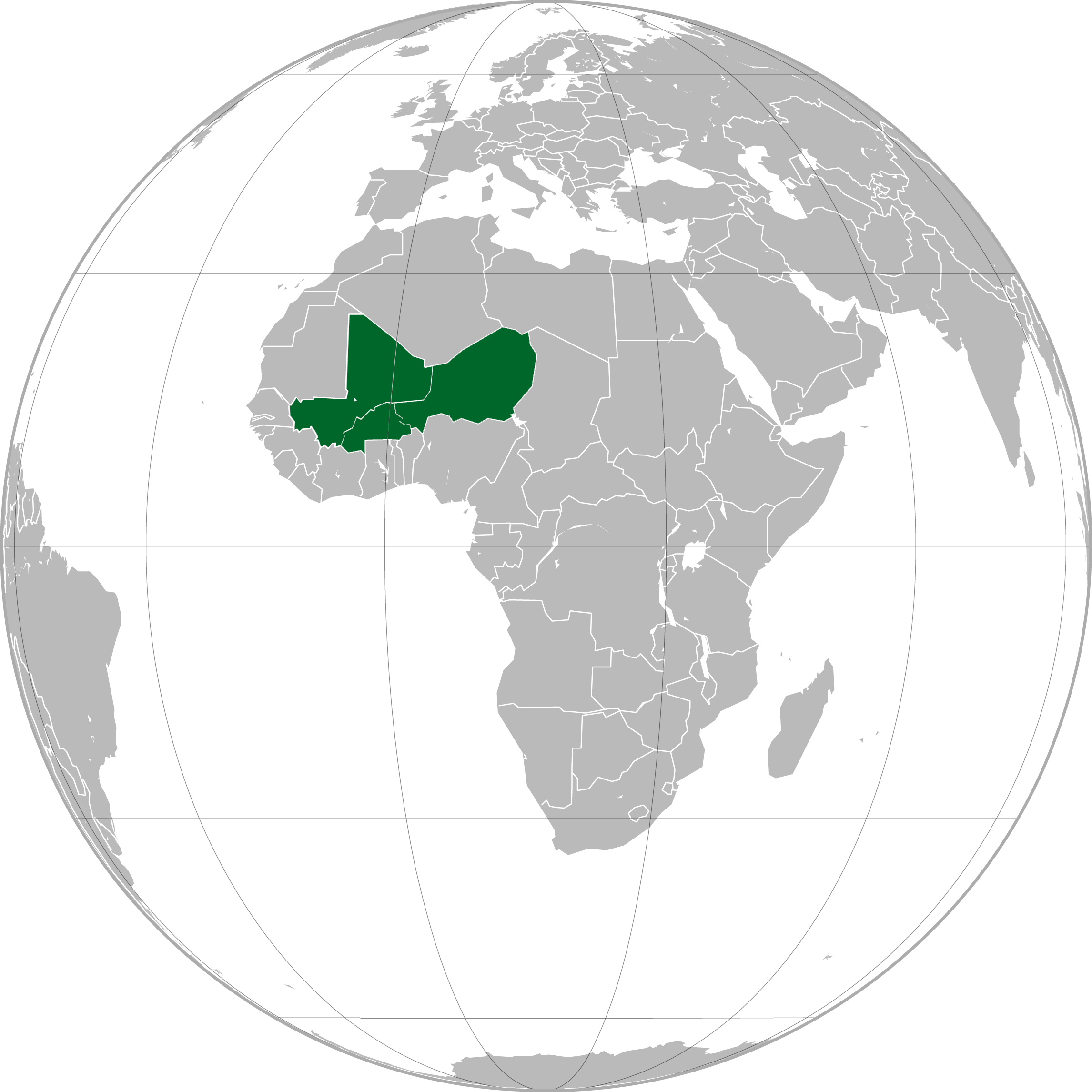
- Capital: Bamako, Mali
- Lingua franca: French
- Demonym: Sahelian
- Type: Confederation
- Member states: Burkina Faso; Mali; Niger

Leaders
  - President: Ibrahim Traoré
- Establishment: 16 September 2023

Area
  - Total: 2,781,392 km^{2} (1,073,901 sq mi)
  - Water (%): 0.74

Population
  - 2024 estimate: 71,375,590
  - Density: 25.7/km^{2} (66.6/sq mi)
- GDP (PPP): 2026 estimate
  - Total: ▲$242.31 billion
  - Per capita: ▲$3,054
- GDP (nominal): 2026 estimate
  - Total: ▲$91.17 billion
  - Per capita: ▲$1,149
- Currency: West African CFA franc (XOF)
- Time zone: UTC+0 / +1 (GMT / WAT)

The Alliance of Sahel States (French: Alliance des États du Sahel; AES) (Note: Also known as the Confederation of Sahel States (French: Confédération des États du Sahel) or AES Confederation) is a political and economic union in the Sahel region of Africa comprising Burkina Faso, Mali and Niger. It originated as a mutual defense pact in 2023. All three member states are under the control of military juntas following a string of successful coups. The confederation's stated goal is the pooling of resources to build energy and communications infrastructure, establish a common market, implement a monetary union under a proposed currency, allow free movement of persons, enable industrialization, and invest in agriculture, mines and the energy sector, with the end goal of federalizing into a single sovereign state.

The confederation is against neo-colonialism and ongoing French influence in their countries, and its members have demonstrated this with acts such as downgrading the status of the French language, renaming of colonial street names, and removal of the French Revolution from school curricula. The AES is against many policies of the French government and the Economic Community of West African States (ECOWAS), which all three member countries left in 2025. In 2024, the AES cut off military relations with Western powers and replaced Western troops on their territory with Russian forces. It has also cut diplomatic ties and expelled ambassadors from some Western countries following critical statements regarding its rapprochement with Russia.

The bloc's economic growth is high, with GDP growing by 6.51% in 2024 and Niger achieving one of the fastest growing economies in the world and in Africa in 2024, though nations of the AES are among the least developed in the world as measured by the Human Development Index.

The region faces numerous challenges, including prolonged periods of ineffective governance, external geopolitical interference, jihadist groups and insurgencies, and imbalanced trade agreements. Amnesty International has accused AES governments of engaging in routine human rights violations including arbitrary detentions, forced disappearances, and massacres of civilians. AES states have all pledged to suspend military rule and return to civilian rule, but these plans have been delayed in each of these countries as the governments work towards increased integration.

== Member states ==
Demographic and development overview of AES member states
| Country | Capital | Official language | Area (km^{2}) | Population (thousands) | | Population density (per km^{2}) | | Human Development Index (HDI) | |
| Country | Capital | Official language | Area (km^{2}) | 2010 | 2025 | 2010 | 2025 | 2010 | 2025 |
|---|---|---|---|---|---|---|---|---|---|
| Burkina Faso | Ouagadougou | Mooré, Dyula | 274,200 | 17,114 | 24,451 | 62.4 | 89.1 | 0.388 | 0.451 |
| Mali | Bamako | Bambara | 1,240,192 | 16,515 | 24,790 | 13.3 | 20.0 | 0.399 | 0.467 |
| Niger | Niamey | Hausa | 1,267,000 | 18,504 | 29,126 | 14.6 | 23.0 | 0.377 | 0.439 |

Economic overview of AES member states
| Country | Nominal GDP (billions USD) | | PPP GDP (billions Intl$.) | | Nominal GDP per capita (USD) | | PPP GDP per capita (Intl$.) | |
| Country | 2010 | 2026 | 2010 | 2026 | 2010 | 2026 | 2010 | 2026 |
|---|---|---|---|---|---|---|---|---|
| Burkina Faso | $10.12 | $32.51 | $24.84 | $79.54 | $625 | $1,319 | $1,536 | $3,227 |
| Mali | $12.44 | $33.85 | $34.33 | $95.36 | $780 | $1,301 | $2,153 | $3,665 |
| Niger | $7.84 | $24.81 | $15.76 | $69.42 | $476 | $822 | $957 | $2,232 |

== History ==
=== Regional insurgencies and successive coups ===
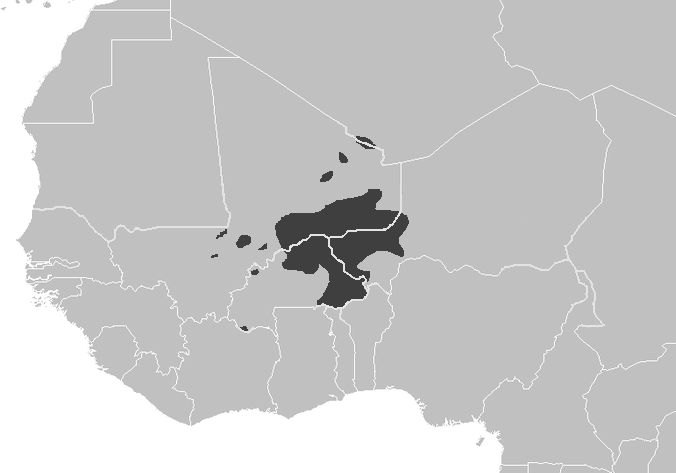
Areas where the Islamic State – Sahel Province operates, July 2021

The Sahel has been the site of an ongoing jihadist insurgency since 2003, which has led to many conflicts in the region, such as the Mali War and the Boko Haram insurgency. These have caused instability and dissatisfaction with governments in the region.

In the 2020 Malian coup d'état, Assimi Goïta and the National Committee for the Salvation of the People seized power in Mali after overthrowing the elected president, Ibrahim Boubacar Keïta. Goïta later led a second coup in 2021, deposing interim president Bah Ndaw who had been nominated to lead a transitional military government.

A few months later, in the 2021 Guinean coup d'état, the National Committee of Reconciliation and Development removed elected president Alpha Condé and installed Mamady Doumbouya as transitional president. Guinea is not a member of the AES, but has been offering diplomatic support to the confederation.

In 2022, Mali withdrew from the internationally backed G5 Sahel alliance. Niger and Burkina Faso did so in 2023, leading to announcement of the dissolution of the framework by its last two members Chad and Mauritania three days later.

A faction of Burkina Faso's military overthrew their existing military government in the September 2022 coup d'état, installing Ibrahim Traoré over Paul-Henri Sandaogo Damiba, who had come to power in the January 2022 coup d'état which toppled the France-aligned government of president Roch Marc Christian Kaboré.

In July 2023, the National Council for the Safeguard of the Homeland removed the elected government of Niger's Mohamed Bazoum, installing Omar Tiani and a new junta in the 2023 coup d'état.

=== Withdrawal of Western forces ===
In 2022, Mali's military government terminated defense agreements with France and accused French troops of failing to contain Islamist insurgencies and interfering in domestic politics. In January 2023, Burkina Faso's military government formally ended its military agreement with France and demanded the withdrawal of 400 French special forces from their country within a month. This was the result of growing nationalist and anti-colonial sentiment in addition to anti-French protests in the country. In July 2023, Niger's military government demanded France withdraw its 1,500 troops. French President Emmanuel Macron initially resisted but eventually announced a full withdrawal by the end of 2023. France's ambassador was also expelled, signaling a complete diplomatic breakdown.

While the U.S. presence in Niger was more counterterrorism-focused, it was also pushed out. Niger had been a key U.S. ally and hosted drone bases with over 1,000 troops and special forces. Niger revoked its military agreement with the United States in March 2024 and ordered the withdrawal of all U.S. forces. This led to the closure of Air Base 101 in Niamey and the $110‑million Air Base 201 drone facility in Agadez. The withdrawal was completed later that year. Mali and Burkina Faso, which had previously expelled French forces and deepened ties with Russia, similarly ended U.S. military cooperation, leaving no American presence in any AES state. The loss of the Niger drone bases was a major setback for U.S. power projection and surveillance capabilities in the Sahel.

The United States has since been working to reset relations and to create new military partnerships with the AES countries.

=== Nigerien crisis and departure from ECOWAS ===
All three of the alliance's member states were suspended by ECOWAS shortly after the ousting of their elected governments. After the coup in Niger, ECOWAS threatened to intervene militarily and restore president Bazoum's government, resulting in a regional crisis. The juntas of Mali and Burkina Faso promised military aid to Niger in the event of an intervention, while Guinea's provided diplomatic support. The promises of military aid resulted in the creation of the Alliance of Sahel States as a mutual defense bloc for the three nations, averting an ECOWAS intervention. The West Africa Peoples Organisation denounced the proposed intervention, calling it a "pretext to carry out imperialist plans to keep Niger (rich in mineral resources, notably uranium and hydrocarbons) continually in the imperialist fold."

On 28 January 2024, the three countries announced in a joint statement their intention to withdraw from ECOWAS. ECOWAS appointed three mediators to begin dialogues with the three countries. On 15 December 2024, ECOWAS heads of state adopted an exit transition period for Niger, Burkina Faso and Mali, which was to begin 29 January 2025 and end on 29 July 2025. The AES rejected the timetable extension proposed by ECOWAS and said it would adhere to its January 2025 withdrawal timeline.

On 29 January 2025, Burkina Faso, Mali, and Niger formally withdrew from ECOWAS after having provided the required 1-year notice. To consolidate their exit from ECOWAS and strengthen their alliance, the three countries began circulating new AES passports and announced a joint 5,000-strong military unit.

AES countries were all founding members of ECOWAS in May 1975. The withdrawal has resulted in ECOWAS losing 76 million of its 446 million people and a significant portion of its total geographical land area. The AES is now geographically larger than ECOWAS, covering 2,781,392 km^{2} compared to ECOWAS's adjusted 2,087,596 km^{2}.

=== Formalization of the Confederation ===
In May 2024 at a meeting in Niamey, representatives of Burkina Faso, Mali and Niger finalized a draft text for the creation of the AES. In July 2024, at a summit in Niamey, the AES heads of state signed a confederation treaty to strengthen the existing mutual defense pact and released a 25-point communique. This included agreement on a one-year rotating presidency, with Assimi Goïta, junta leader and interim president of Mali, commencing his term on the same day. It was agreed that the first joint AES parliamentary summit would be hosted in Burkina Faso.

On 22 February 2025, AES ministers officially launched the flag of the AES after its validation by the heads of state of the member countries.

Goïta handed over to Ibrahim Traoré as President of the AES on December 24, 2025.

Beginning on January 2025, AES ministers began working on the creation of a joint parliament. On 24 August 2026, Confederal Parliament of AES was formally installed in Niamey. A total of 45 lawmakers comprise the parliament, namely 15 from each AES country.

=== Relations with the West African Economic and Monetary Union ===
AES countries have not shown their readiness to break ties with the West African Economic and Monetary Union (WAEMU, also known by its French acronym UEMOA), which is headquartered in Burkina Faso. Leaving UEMOA is a more complex decision than leaving ECOWAS. UEMOA member countries share a single currency, the CFA franc, which is based on a convertibility guarantee by the French Treasury. If a country leaves UEMOA, it will have to recover its foreign exchange reserves, currently divided between the UEMOA Central Bank in Abidjan (50%) and the French Treasury (50%). Nonetheless, proposals have been made for a joint AES central bank and a new currency to replace the CFA franc.

The AES adopted a confederal levy on imports originating outside the UEMOA to support operations of the newly created AES regional development bank.

== Initiatives ==
The Confederation of Sahel States has announced various measures towards its stated goals of regional stability, economic independence, and self reliance.

=== Economic integration ===
Proposals have been made regarding a common central bank jointly with the introduction of a new currency to replace the CFA franc. In an effort to boost agricultural and energy self-reliance, joint infrastructure programs are envisioned, and export controls on grain towards the rest of ECOWAS have been implemented. Energy regulators from Burkina Faso, Mali, and Niger met in Bamako in May 2025 to harmonise their policies on energy security and promote renewable energy.

=== Investment bank ===
Plans for an AES bank were first announced in May 2025. In December 2025, the AES formally established the Confederal Investment and Development Bank (BCID-AES) as its financial arm. The bank was created following the signing of its founding charter in Bamako under AES President Assimi Goïta. The announcement was made by Burkina Faso's Minister of Economy and Finance, Aboubacar Nacanabo.

The BCID-AES was launched with an initial capital of 500 billion CFA francs (approximately US$895 million) and is financed through contributions from the three member states. Each country is expected to allocate around 5% of annual tax revenues to the bank, supplemented by a confederal levy to strengthen its resources. The bank's mandate is to mobilize resources for priority projects in infrastructure (particularly road networks), agriculture and food security, energy and regional interconnections, and private-sector initiatives aligned with national development priorities. The bank follows the model of regional development institutions like the West African Development Bank (BOAD) and the Development Bank of Central African States (BDEAC), which finance public and private investments across their member states. The creation of the BCID-AES is a step toward financial sovereignty, one of the four pillars guiding the AES along with collective security, economic integration, and cultural and educational identity.

=== Joint military force ===
A joint AES military force was first announced when Mali, Niger and Burkina Faso left ECOWAS in January 2025. In December 2025, the AES launched a new 5,000 member military force to combat Islamist insurgencies and transnational crime across the Sahel. The United Force of the Alliance of Sahel States (FU‑AES) was formally inaugurated at an air force base in Bamako on December 20, 2025, with AES President Goïta overseeing the ceremony. The force unites troops from all three countries and integrates air, intelligence, and ground coordination to conduct operations against extremist groups in the tri‑border region. Malian general Daouda Traoré was appointed commander. The headquarters is based in Niamey.

=== AES TV Channel ===
On 22 December 2025, the AES officially launched AES TV, the dedicated regional television channel of the AES. The inauguration, in Bamako was marked by a ceremony attended by the leaders of all three AES countries. The channel's stated mission is to promote communication and unity among AES member states, as well as highlight national achievements and public policies. Beyond news, AES TV showcases cultural, political, and social content about the region.

AES TV is carried on multiple satellites, including Intelsat 37e @ 18°W and Intelsat 35e @ 34.5°W.

=== Common culture ===
On 5 February 2025, the AES states established a "common cultural policy".

=== Judicial cooperation and regional court ===
AES ministers met in May 2025 to establish judicial cooperation within the AES. The meeting, chaired by Malian Prime Minister Abdoulaye Maïga, focused on creating a common legal framework to address transnational challenges, including insecurity, arms proliferation, and money laundering. The goal was to enhance judicial convergence without unifying laws and to make systems interoperable while improving governance, legal protections, and institutional stability. Participants proposed the establishment of a regional criminal court aimed at addressing terrorism, violent extremism, and human rights violations in the Sahel region. This initiative shows a commitment to unified judicial responses against security and governance challenges in the region. A decision has not yet been made on the location of the proposed court. A high-security prison of "international standards" will also be built to house convicted prisoners.

=== Withdrawal from the ICC ===
In September 2025, the AES criticized the International Criminal Court as "a neo-colonial imperialist tool" and announced plans to withdraw from it in favor of "indigenous mechanisms for the consolidation of peace and justice". Burundi, the first African country to leave the ICC in October 2017 citing the Court's alleged bias against African leaders, expressed support for the decision of the AES. In July 2026, the ICC confirmed that the AES states had initiated the one-year withdrawal process.

=== Food security ===
The AES has created the Alliance of Agricultural Seed Producers of the Sahel (APSA-Sahel) to strengthen regional food sovereignty and promote seed systems locally adapted to the Sahelian climate. The initiative is designed to reduce dependence on foreign seed imports, promote indigenous seed varieties, and increase seed research, production, and distribution in the Sahel. The AES is also developing a confederation‑wide joint purchasing agency to better regulate cereal markets, build a shared grain reserve, and strengthen food security across the region. AES President Assimi Goïta announced the initiative in December 2025.

=== AES Games ===
From 21 to 28 June 2025, Mali hosted the first Alliance of Sahel States Games. More than 500 professional athletes from AES states competed in soccer, traditional wrestling, archery, and other events. The games are part of an effort by the AES to build solidarity under their confederation.

=== AES Airline ===
In May 2026 AES authorities announced plans to create an airline for the confederation to serve its member states. The goal of the airline is to enhance regional connectivity and support economic exchanges within the confederation. The airline is expected to launch after the end of 2026.

=== Other measures ===
Roaming charges for telephone communications between the three countries have been abolished. A joint biometric passport for AES citizens was introduced in January 2025. At the end of March 2025, AES countries introduced a common customs duty of 0.5% on imports from outside the AES. In May 2025, AES culture ministers validated the adoption of the official anthem of the confederation. Experts from the road authorities of Mali, Burkina Faso and Niger met in May 2025 to define a common approach to road safety.

== Resources ==
The AES countries are resource rich. For example, Niger is among the world's biggest uranium exporters and for many years has been a major uranium exporter to the EU. Some major known resources in AES territory include:

| Country | Natural Resources | Other Resources |
|---|---|---|
| Niger | uranium, coal, iron ore, tin, phosphates, gold, molybdenum, gypsum, salt, petroleum, copper, lithium | |
| Burkina Faso | gold, manganese, zinc, limestone, marble, phosphates, pumice, salt, lithium, copper | cotton |
| Mali (Note: Bauxite, iron ore, manganese, tin, and copper deposits are known but not exploited.) | gold, phosphates, kaolin, salt, limestone, uranium, gypsum, granite, hydropower, lithium | cotton |

The AES is renegotiating relationships with Western and Chinese companies to assert greater control over resources and operations. In 2025, some mining assets within the AES were nationalized to increase government ownership in industrial mines operated by foreign entities and to boost earnings from mineral wealth.

Niger has withdrawn French nuclear company Orano's license to mine uranium after 50 years of operation in the country. French oil giant TotalEnergies sold its assets in Mali and Burkina Faso. Canadian company GoviEX has had its uranium licenses revoked in Niger. Barrick Gold paid $430 million to Mali to regain access to the Loulo-Gounkoto gold mine after a two-year dispute.

In March 2025, Niger requested top local officials of China National Petroleum Corporation, Zinder Refining Company and the West African Gas Pipeline Company (responsible for the construction and operation of the Niger–Benin Oil Pipeline) depart the country due to contract issues.

== Foreign relations ==
=== France ===
Air France has been barred from operating flights to AES countries.

After having expelled French troops in 2022 and 2023, AES states in March 2025 further distanced themselves from France by announcing their decisions to withdraw from the Organisation Internationale de la Francophonie (OIF), an international organization established in 1970 in Niamey, Niger, to promote the French language and encourage cooperation among French-speaking nations. Although the three AES countries are founding members of the OIF, they were suspended from the organization following the coups that brought military leadership to power, and consider the organization "a politically manipulated instrument". Anti-French in outlook, the countries removed French as an official language in favour of native tongues, and renamed colonial street names. Mali also suspended teaching of the French Revolution in schools.

=== United States ===
On 16 December 2025, the United States announced an expanded travel ban affecting several countries, including the AES nations. The ban, starting on 1 January 2026, was justified on the grounds of national security, terrorism risks, visa overstays, and concerns about information sharing. In response, the AES countries invoked the principle of reciprocity and imposed their own travel restrictions on U.S. citizens.

On 8 January 2026, the AES strongly condemned and denounced the United States's "act of aggression" against Venezuela and the illegal abduction of Venezuelan President Nicolás Maduro and his wife.

In July 2026, U.S. Assistant Secretary of State for African Affairs Frank Garcia travelled to Mali to discuss security cooperation.

=== Relations with neighbors ===
==== ECOWAS ====
Details of how ECOWAS will treat AES citizens are to be worked out, but until further notice ECOWAS continues to recognize passports and identity cards bearing the ECOWAS logo held by citizens from Mali, Niger and Burkina Faso. AES citizens continue to enjoy the right of visa-free movement, residence, and establishment in accordance with ECOWAS protocols and goods and services from the three countries will be treated under the ECOWAS Trade Liberalisation Scheme (ETLS) and investment policy until further notice.

==== Chad ====
Chad has been working to strengthen relationships with AES countries to enhance regional security and counter-terrorism efforts. Like the AES countries, Chad has ended its defense cooperation agreement with France. In May 2025, the Chadian Minister of Communications and government spokesperson stated: "I think it would be a good thing for Chad to join the Alliance of Sahel States."

==== Guinea ====
Mamady Doumbouya's government in Guinea, like those of the AES states, is a military junta that seized power in a coup d'état. Guinea has ignored border restrictions imposed by ECOWAS and given the AES access to its ports, which allowed Mali to import Russian grain and fertilizer. The port of Conakry is also an important logistics node for Russian Africa Corps forces stationed in the AES.

==== Senegal ====
Senegal's President Bassirou Diomaye Faye has been urging both ECOWAS and the AES states to engage in dialogue and work together to address common challenges such as terrorism, climate change, and poverty.

==== Togo ====
Togo has been actively collaborating with AES member countries on security and economic initiatives. In January 2025, Togo's Foreign Minister Robert Dussey announced that the Togolese government had not ruled out joining the AES, calling it "not impossible." In March 2025, Dussey reaffirmed that Togo was considering joining the AES. This coincided with a poll published in March 2025 stating the majority of Togolese favor their country joining the AES.

The AES and Togo are working to establish an interconnected customs area. This would allow the landlocked AES countries to use Togo's Lomé port without large tariffs. Use of ports has been a source of tension between the AES and the coastal countries in ECOWAS.

Togo and Burkina Faso signed an agreement to eliminate roaming charges for incoming calls between the two countries starting 30 May 2025.

In July 2026, supplies for Africa Corps troops in the AES were unloaded at the port of Lomé for the first time. They were then transported in a convoy through Togo and Burkina Faso to Mali.

==== Ghana ====
In December 2024, president John Dramani Mahama proposed an initiative to support the AES in combating terrorism. He urged neighboring countries and international organizations, including ECOWAS, to address the crisis in the Sahel. Mahama stated that the instability threatens not only the Sahel but all of West Africa. He called on countries like Ghana, Senegal, Côte d'Ivoire, and Benin to play a more active role in supporting the region. On 21 January 2025, Ghana appointed a special envoy to the Confederation of Sahel States, Larry Gbevlo-Lartey, who was tasked with bridging Ghana's relations with AES states.

==== Algeria ====
The Algerian government has previously played a role as mediator in Mali's internal conflicts, especially with Tuareg rebel groups in northern Mali, but recent developments have distanced the two sides. A Malian drone was shot down near the Algerian border on 31 March 2025. Mali's Prime Minister denied Algerian claims that the drone had violated Algerian airspace, adding that Mali would file a complaint with international bodies. The AES called the act a violation of international law and "proof" of state-sponsored terrorism by Algeria. Mali withdrew its ambassador to Algeria over the issue, stating: "The destruction of the drone has the effect, if not the aim of hindering the neutralization of armed groups that have claimed responsibility for terrorist acts."

=== Foreign partners ===
The AES has been working to diminish the influence and control of former colonial power France over its resources, territory, diplomatic relations, and trade. As part of this realignment, AES states have been seeking new partnerships to fill the vacuum left by France's exit. This has resulted in an intention to increase economic and security cooperation with Russia, Belarus, Myanmar, Turkey, China, Iran, Azerbaijan, North Korea, and Afghanistan.

Russian involvement notably includes a joint satellite program with Roscosmos, and military assistance from Wagner Group mercenaries and later the Russian Africa Corps. In June 2025, Russia signed nuclear cooperation agreements with Burkina Faso and Mali for the peaceful use of atomic energy, infrastructure development, and energy security. The Burkina Faso–Russia Agreement, finalized during the St. Petersburg International Economic Forum, includes the construction of a nuclear power plant, developing regulations, and training specialists. Rosatom also pledged scholarships and technical support, aiming to address Burkina Faso's severe electricity shortage. The Mali–Russia Agreement, signed during Assimi Goïta's visit to Russia, includes nuclear infrastructure, safety regulations, training, and applications in medicine, agriculture, and industry. The agreement is expected to boost Mali's energy autonomy and reduce reliance on imports.

Turkey's foreign, defense, and energy ministers met with their counterparts in Niger to discuss new deals in the areas of security and defense, trade, energy, and mining on 17 July 2024. Turkish Sadat military contractors operate in Niger as of January 2025.

Iran and Niger signed a joint cooperation agreement during the third meeting of their Joint Economic Committee on the sidelines of the Iran Expo 2025 in April 2025.

=== Accusations of destabilization ===
The leaders of the AES have publicly accused Western countries (especially France) of actions to undermine their security, sovereignty, and political stability. These allegations have become more prominent since the three states expelled French military forces from their territory and withdrew from ECOWAS. Their accusations include claims that Western actors have:

- Supported or facilitated the activities of armed groups in the region
- Interfered with regional security initiatives
- Engaged in covert actions aimed at weakening AES governments
- Sought to maintain influence in the Sahel through political or economic pressure
- Supported networks involved in political or security-related destabilization

These allegations form part of the AES governments’ stated rationale for distancing themselves from Western military partnerships and pursuing alternative security and diplomatic arrangements. Western governments, including France, have consistently denied these accusations.

The AES has expressed strong opposition to Ukrainian support of rebels in the Sahel after comments by Ukrainian officials in August 2024 stating they had supported Jihadists in an ambush that killed Malian soldiers. Mali and Niger subsequently cut diplomatic ties with Ukraine. The AES has called on the United Nations to take action against Ukraine and accused Ukraine of supporting terrorism in the Sahel. Amid the dispute between Mali and Ukraine, Sweden's ambassador to Mali accused the Malian government of supporting an "illegal Russian war" in Ukraine, and Sweden halted planned financial assistance to Mali. Mali responded by expelling the Swedish ambassador and ending their diplomatic engagement.

==== Destabilization‑related detentions ====
AES authorities have announced several arrests in recent years involving individuals they accuse of involvement in destabilization efforts. Notable cases include:

- Yann Vezilier, an agent of French foreign intelligence service DGSE, was detained by Malian authorities in August 2025 and accused of involvement in espionage and destabilization activities. French officials rejected the allegations. He remained in custody throughout the following year and, on 6 June 2026, was sentenced to 20 years in prison for espionage and attempting to undermine state security. He was pardoned and returned to France in August 2026.
- Paul‑Henri Sandaogo Damiba, former transitional president of Burkina Faso, was extradited from Togo to Burkina Faso in January 2026. He faces accusations from Burkinabè authorities of involvement in attempted coups following his removal from power in 2022. The case remains subject to ongoing legal and political processes, and the individuals involved deny wrongdoing.
- The country director of the International NGO Safety Organisation (INSO) was arrested in Burkina Faso in July 2025 and accused (along with his team) of espionage and using NGO activities as a cover for intelligence gathering. The incident intensified government suspicion toward foreign NGOs operating in the Sahel. Burkina Faso had suspended INSO's operations, alleging the organization collected sensitive data without authorization and labeling the detained staff an "espionage network," a claim INSO rejected. After several months in detention, the Burkinabè authorities released all eight INSO staff members, including the director. Their release appears to have resulted from quiet diplomatic negotiations rather than a formal prosecution. INSO has denied that the organisation or its staff have been involved in espionage.

== Symbols ==
The flag of the AES was officially approved by AES heads of state prior to its unveiling on 22 February 2025, in Bamako. The flag features the logo of the AES, which includes an orange sun above a baobab tree. Below the tree, a group of silhouetted figures is depicted standing together. The design includes an outline of the three member territories, shown without internal borders, set against a green background. The color green symbolizes hope, prosperity, and renewal, and also represents the region's vast natural resources, which are seen as a foundation for future shared prosperity. The silhouetted figures symbolize unity between Mali, Niger, and Burkina Faso.

== Leadership ==
President of the Alliance of Sahel States

| Officeholder | Country | Term |
|---|---|---|
| Assimi Goïta | Mali | 6 July 2024 - 24 December 2025 |
| Ibrahim Traoré | Burkina Faso | 24 December 2025 - Incumbent |

Current Heads of State

| Country | Officeholder | Office | Since | Term End |
|---|---|---|---|---|
| Burkina Faso | Ibrahim Traoré | President of Burkina Faso | 2 July 2024 | 2 July 2029 |
| Mali | Assimi Goïta | President of Mali | 8 July 2025 | 8 July 2030 |
| Niger | Abdourahamane Tiani | President of Niger | 26 March 2025 | 26 March 2030 |

Current Heads of Government

| Country | Officeholder | Office | Since |
|---|---|---|---|
| Burkina Faso | Jean Emmanuel Ouédraogo | Prime Minister | 7 December 2024 |
| Mali | Abdoulaye Maïga | Prime Minister | 21 November 2024 |
| Niger | Ali Lamine Zeine | Prime Minister | 8 August 2023 |

Former Transitional Offices

Burkina Faso

| Officeholder | Office | Term |
|---|---|---|
| Ibrahim Traoré | President of Burkina Faso | 30 September 2022 - 2 July 2024 |
| Apollinaire J. Kyélem de Tambèla | Prime Minister | 21 October 2022 - 6 December 2024 |

Mali

| Officeholder | Office | Term |
|---|---|---|
| Assimi Goïta | Interim President of Mali | 28 May 2021 - 8 July 2025 |
| Choguel Kokalla Maïga | Prime Minister | 6 June 2021 - 20 November 2024 |

Niger

| Officeholder | Office | Term |
|---|---|---|
| Abdourahamane Tiani | President of the National Council for the Safeguard of the Homeland | 28 July 2023 - 26 March 2025 |
| Salifou Modi | Vice President of the National Council for the Safeguard of the Homeland | 27 July 2023 - present |

== See also ==
- Anti-French sentiment
- Decolonization
- Liptako–Gourma Authority
