= List of ambassadors of Sweden to Peru =

Ambassador of Sweden to Peru
- Lesser coat of arms of the Kingdom of Sweden
- Incumbent; Johanna Teague since August 2026
- Ministry for Foreign Affairs; Swedish Embassy, Lima
- Style: His or Her Excellency (formal); Mr. or Madam Ambassador (informal)
- Reports to: Minister for Foreign Affairs
- Residence: Calle La Santa María 120-130 (Note: The address of the residence and chancery in Lima that the Swedish state still owns.)
- Seat: Lima, Peru
- Appointer: Government of Sweden
- Term length: No fixed term
- Inaugural holder: Einar Modig
- Formation: 1931

The Ambassador of Sweden to Peru (known formally as the Ambassador of the Kingdom of Sweden to the Republic of Peru) is the official representative of the government of Sweden to the president of Peru and government of Peru.

== History ==
Both countries established diplomatic relations in the 1930s and maintained diplomatic missions in both Lima and Stockholm.

In November 1956, an agreement was reached between the Swedish and Peruvian governments on the mutual elevation of the respective countries' legations to embassies. The diplomatic rank was thereafter changed to ambassador instead of envoy extraordinary and minister plenipotentiary.

In 1983, after Ambassador Cai Melin expressed support for Amnesty International during a private event in Peru—which had criticized the Peruvian regime in a letter for torture and arbitrary executions, including of Indigenous people during the Peruvian Civil War—he faced criticism from the Peruvian Ministry of Foreign Affairs. They conveyed their dissatisfaction with Melin to the Swedish Ministry for Foreign Affairs. The regime in Peru, under President Fernando Belaúnde, had been displeased with Amnesty's criticism. Melin was recalled, even though he had not been officially declared persona non grata by the Peruvian government.

The Swedish embassy in Lima was closed in 2001 but reopened in 2016 and the embassy of Peru in Stockholm was closed in 2010 but reopened in 2012. The Swedish embassy closed again in 2022. From 2025 to 2026, the Swedish ambassador to Peru was resident in Stockholm.

In December 2025, the Swedish government decided to reopen a Swedish embassy in Lima in the fall of 2026. In June 2026, a new resident ambassador of Sweden to Lima was appointed, assuming office in August of the same year.

== List of representatives ==
Name	Period	Resident/Non resident	Title	Notes	Presented credentials	Ref
Einar Modig	1 January 1931 (Note: Appointed on 30 July 1930.) – 28 April 1933	Resident	Acting envoy	Also accredited to Bogotá, Caracas, La Paz, and Quito.		
Einar Modig	28 April 1933 – 1934	Resident	Envoy	Also accredited to Bogotá, Caracas, La Paz, and Quito.		
Vilhelm Assarsson	1935–1937	Resident	Envoy	Also accredited to Bogotá, Caracas, La Paz, and Quito.		
Gunnar Reuterskiöld	1937–1945	Resident	Envoy	Also accredited to Bogotá, Caracas (until 1938), La Paz, and Quito.		
Martin Kastengren	1945–1951	Resident	Envoy	Also accredited to La Paz and Quito.		
Harry Eriksson	1951–1952	Resident	Envoy	Also accredited to La Paz.		
Claes Westring	1952 – November 1956	Resident	Envoy	Also accredited to La Paz (until 1956).		
Claes Westring	November 1956 – 31 January 1959	Resident	Ambassador		10 January 1957	
Malte Pripp	1959–1962	Resident	Ambassador			
Carl Henrik Petersén	1962–1966	Resident	Ambassador	Also accredited to La Paz.		
Torsten Björck	1966–1974	Resident	Ambassador	Also accredited to La Paz.		
Göran Engblom	1975–1978	Resident	Ambassador	Also accredited to La Paz.		
Ulf Norström	1979–1982	Resident	Ambassador	Also accredited to La Paz.		
Cai Melin	1982–1983	Resident	Ambassador	Also accredited to La Paz.		
Hans Linton	1984–1989	Resident	Ambassador	Also accredited to La Paz.		
Carl-Erhard Lindahl	1989–1992	Resident	Ambassador	Also accredited to La Paz.		
Lars Schönander	1992–1996	Resident	Ambassador	Also accredited to La Paz.		
Ulf Lewin	1996–2000	Resident	Ambassador	Also accredited to La Paz.		
Mikael Dahl	2000–2001	Resident	Ambassador	Also accredited to La Paz.		
Arne Rodin	2001–2005	Non-resident	Ambassador	Resident in Santiago.		
Martin Wilkens	2005–2006	Non-resident	Chargé d'affaires ad interim	Resident in Santiago.		
Maria Christina Lundqvist	2006–2008	Non-resident	Ambassador	Resident in Santiago.		
Eva Zetterberg	2009–2014	Non-resident	Ambassador	Resident in Santiago.		
Jakob Kiefer	2015–2016	Non-resident	Ambassador	Resident in Santiago.		
Anna Ferry	September 2016 – 2019	Resident	Ambassador			
Cecilia Ekholm	1 September 2019 – 2021	Resident	Ambassador			
Maria Cramér	August 2021 – 2022	Resident	Ambassador			
Tomas Wiklund	18 April 2023 – 2025	Non-resident	Ambassador	Resident in Santiago.		
Peter Svensson Kemeny	2025–2026	Non-resident	Ambassador	Resident in Stockholm.		
Johanna Teague	August 2026 – present	Resident	Ambassador			

== Gallery ==
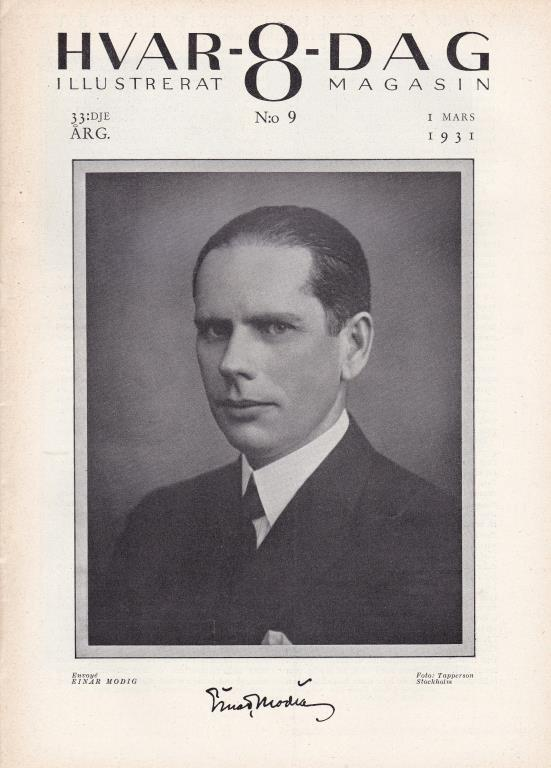
Einar Modig (1931–1934)

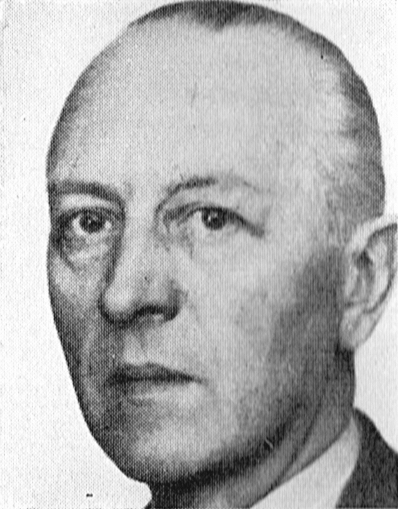
Vilhelm Assarsson (1935–1937)

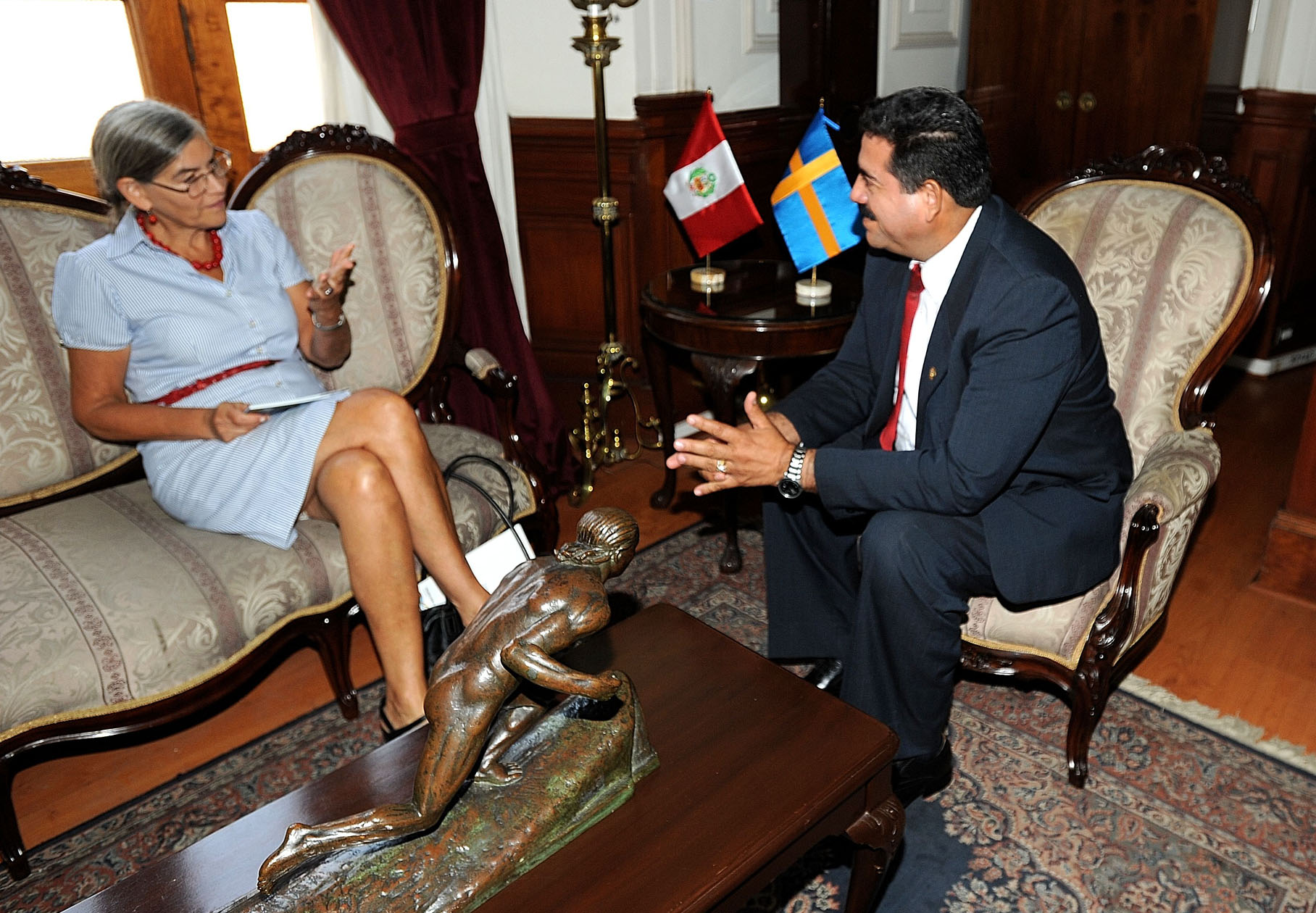
Eva Zetterberg (2009–2014)

== See also ==
- Peru–Sweden relations
- Embassy of Sweden, Lima
- List of ambassadors of Peru to Sweden
