= Support Committees for the Peruvian Revolution =

- Comités de Apoyo a la Revolución Peruana
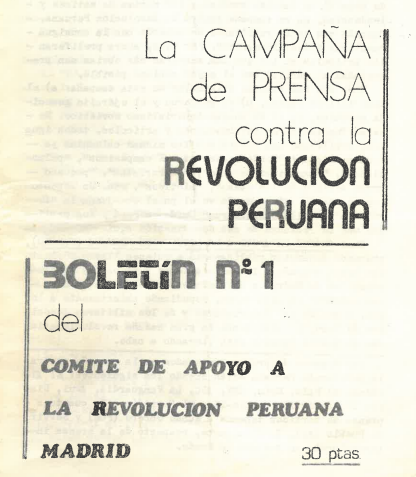
- Bulletin cover for the Madrid branch of CARP
- Other name: CARP
- Dates active: 1980s–2000s
- Allegiance: Shining Path
- Ideology: Marxism-Leninism-Maoism; Anti-imperialism; Gonzalo Thought
- Political position: far-left
- Status: Defunct
- Part of: Peru People's Movement
- Wars: Internal conflict in Peru

Support Committees for the Peruvian Revolution (Spanish: Comités de Apoyo a la Revolución Peruana, CARP) were a series of associations intended to rally support for the Communist Party of Peru-Shining Path, as part of the party's international arm of outreach.

== Places ==
Support committees were established in Sweden, France, Spain, United States, Netherlands, Denmark, Germany, Mexico, and Bolivia.

== Activities ==
=== Propaganda ===
Objectives include performing proselytism, collecting funds, making propaganda, and spreading a positive image of the Shining Path.

The committee's financial support for the Shining Path was raised through cultural and artistic events such as the Musical Guerrilla Army, conferences, and selling brochures such as El Diario, the official newspaper of the group.

In 1992, after Abimael Guzmán's arrest, the "Committee to Support the Revolution in Peru" placed ads in The Nation, The Village Voice and La Opinión criticizing the Peruvian government. These ads were signed by Ramsey Clark, Noam Chomsky, Philip Berrigan, and other activists. Some of the signatories (including Berrigan) told The Nation after the fact that they had not agreed to sign or had been misled as to the group behind the ads. After the ads were published, the Peru Peace Network (PPN), a group of American religious and human rights organizations working in Peru, launched a counter-campaign, approaching signers of the ad individually and giving them a flier.

=== Terrorism ===
The support committees were also involved in the Shining Path's clandestine terrorism, such as the 1988 assassination of Peruvian captain Juan Vega Llona and the 1992 Peruvian embassy attack in Stockholm.

In 1988, Peruvian captain Juan Vega Llona was shot to death during a trip to La Paz, Bolivia by a hit squad of Shining Path assassins supported by CARP-Bolivia. The Central Committee had ordered for Llona's annihilation in retribution for his involvement in the 1986 Peruvian prison riots, in which 224 Shining Path prisoners were killed during an uprising.

CARP's branches were also used to vandalize and threaten numerous Peruvian embassies, a tactic mainly inspired by the 1992 attempted assassination of Peruvian ambassador Gustavo Silva Aranda in Stockholm, Sweden.

== Opposition ==
Due to the brutal nature of Shining Path, these Committees often faced opposition.

When Alberto Fujimori visited San Francisco, Amnesty International picketed both the hotel where he spoke and a Berkeley bookstore selling Shining Path propaganda.

The Peruvian government published a booklet listing the atrocities of the groups and asked the European host countries to withdraw political asylum status from Peruvians who propagandize for the guerrillas.

== See also ==
- Peru–Sweden relations
- List of ambassadors of Peru to Sweden
- 1986 Soviet embassy attack in Lima
- 1987 North Korean embassy attack in Lima
