= List of ambassadors of Denmark to Peru =

Danish Ambassador to Peru
- Coat of arms of Denmark
- Incumbent; Henrik Bramsen Hahn since 2023
- Inaugural holder: Viggo Jensen
- Formation: 1956

The ambassador extraordinary and plenipotentiary of the Kingdom of Denmark of the Republic of Peru is the foremost representative of the Kingdom of Denmark to the government of Peru. The ambassador, formerly resident in Lima, is currently accredited from the Embassy of Denmark in Santiago de Chile. In the past, the ambassador in La Paz was accredited to Peru instead.

Both countries established diplomatic relations on May 18, 1848. Relations were elevated to embassy level in 1956, with King Frederik IX issuing a decree on November 26, 1956, that elevated the legation in Lima to an embassy.

On the other hand, Peru maintained an embassy in Copenhagen from 1957 until its closure in 1988. It was reopened in 1999, but closed permanently in 2003. The Peruvian ambassador in Stockholm has been accredited to Denmark during the 1990s and since 2003, with a brief exception from 2011 to 2012, where the Peruvian ambassador in Berlin was accredited instead.

== List of representatives ==
Name	Term begin	Term end	Monarch	Notes
Viggo Jensen	1956	1962	Frederik IX	First ambassador to Peru after being elevated from minister plenipotentiary. Accredited to Bolivia, Colombia, Ecuador and Venezuela.
Børge Vagner Blond	December 1, 1962		Frederik IX	
Vagn Hoffmeyer Hoelgaard	January 1963		Frederik IX	Hoffmeyer presented his credentials on January 11, 1963.
Johan Frederik Andreas Holck Colding	1968		Frederik IX	
Nonny Wright	1976	1979	Margrethe II	
Embassy in Lima closed
Bent Kiilerich	2003	2008	Margrethe II	Travelling ambassador.
Morten Elkjær	January 15, 2010	2013	Margrethe II	Resident in Bolivia.
Jens Godtfredsen	2018	2022	Margrethe II	Resident in Chile.
Andreas Høj Fierro	December 4, 2022	2022	Margrethe II	Chargé d'affaires, resident in Lima.
Henrik Bramsen Hahn	April 2023	Incumbent	Margrethe II	Resident in Chile.

== See also ==
- List of ambassadors of Peru to Denmark
