= 1992 Peruvian embassy attack in Stockholm =

Terrorist attack in Stockholm, Sweden

1992 Peruvian embassy attack
- Part of the Internal conflict in Peru
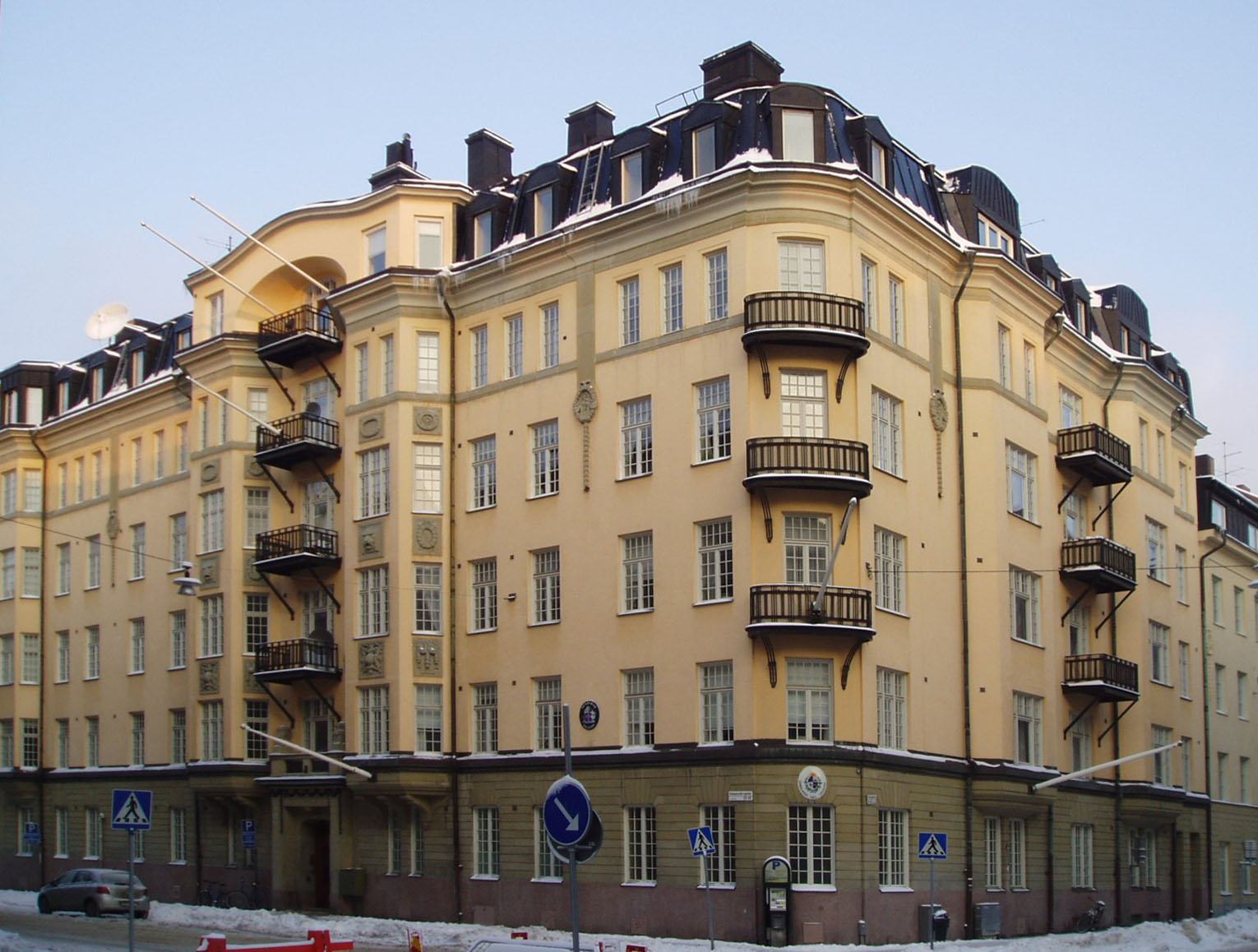
- The current embassy in 2010
- Location: Embassy of Peru, Stockholm, Sweden
- Date: c. August 1992
- Target: Gustavo Adolfo Silva Aranda
- Attack type: Shooting; Communist terrorism
- Deaths: 0
- Injuries: 0
- Perpetrator: Shining Path

The 1992 Peruvian embassy attack in Stockholm was a terrorist attack and assassination attempt carried out by the Shining Path on the Peruvian embassy in the city of Stockholm, Sweden. It unsuccessfully targeted the Peruvian ambassador Gustavo Adolfo Silva Aranda.

The attack was the first of its type, with other Peruvian embassies being targeted in a similar fashion soon after.

== Background ==
During the internal conflict in Peru, the left-wing terror group Shining Path established foreign branches, such as the Support Committees for the Peruvian Revolution (CARP), who worked overseas to finance the group. By the early 1990s, Peruvian embassies in Europe had become "accustomed to periodically receiving threats" from the group.

Stockholm had become a particular stronghold of the group in Europe as the family of Augusta La Torre, Abimael Guzmán's first wife, had moved there from Peru in the 1980s. Consequently, a pro-Shining Path community cemented itself in the area, being led by a man in his fifties already known to the embassy, described as the eminence grise of the community. Nevertheless, members of La Torre's family had become polarised regarding their relative and the group's activities, with some members bitterly opposing the group and others actively supporting it. The latter began its support when La Torre's brother-in-law, Javier Esparza, contacted Guzmán successfully proposing the establishment of the Ayacucho Studies Circle, a family-run group that organised protests and distributed propaganda flyers, among other activities. Members of the group were arrested in 1986 after painting pro-Shining Path graffiti on the walls of the embassy. La Torre died in 1988, but the family's support for the group continued far beyond her death.

== Attack ==
The embassy was first painted over with "blood-red" slogans, followed by a shooting and an assassination attempt that targeted ambassador Gustavo Adolfo Silva Aranda. The attempt ultimately failed due to the arrival of the Swedish police to the scene.

After the attack, the same pattern began affecting other Peruvian embassies in Europe, starting with the embassy in London in early August. Embassies in Spain, Belgium, Germany, Sweden, Switzerland, France, Denmark and Mexico (which also had a dog hanged on top of it, similar to an incident that took place in Lima 12 years prior), already used to death threats over the phone, were also being splashed with red paint by the group. The events caused the Peruvian government to increase its spending in security.

An investigation launched by the embassy later revealed that a sister of Abimael Guzmán had been operating in Malmö.

== See also ==
- Japanese embassy hostage crisis
- 1986 Soviet embassy attack in Lima
- 1987 North Korean embassy attack in Lima

== Bibliography ==
- Gao, Jian (2021). "Causing Troubles Elsewhere: The Shining Path and Its International Networks, 1980–1993". Asian Journal of Latin American Studies. 34 (1). The University of Texas at Austin / Shanghai University: 49–75. doi:10.22945/ajlas.2021.34.1.49.
- Heilman, Jaymie Patricia (2010-04-01). "Family Ties: The Political Genealogy of Shining Path's Comrade Norah". Bulletin of Latin American Research. 29 (2): 155–169. doi:10.1111/j.1470-9856.2009.00321.x. JSTOR 27805111.
