= Finland–Peru relations =

- Finland: Peru

Diplomatic mission
- Embassy of Finland, Lima: Embassy of Peru, Helsinki

Finland–Peru relations are foreign relations between Finland and Peru. Peru recognized Finland on June 23, 1919, and both countries established relations on March 26, 1963.

Peru has an embassy in Helsinki. Finland has an embassy in Lima which is also accredited to Bolivia and Ecuador.

== History ==
Peru recognized Finland after its independence from Russia on June 23, 1919, and both countries established relations on March 26, 1963.

Finland opened an embassy in Lima on July 1, 1963. However, it was closed on September 1, 1991, due to the economic depression affecting the country at the time, as well as the Internal conflict in Peru. The embassy was reopened on February 1, 1998. The former Swedish embassy now solely houses the diplomatic mission of Finland since 2022. In addition to the embassy, an ambassadorial residence was formerly operated in San Isidro, located at the address of Guillermo Marconi 270, between the embassies of North and South Korea.

== Resident diplomatic missions ==
- Finland has an embassy in Lima.
- Peru has an embassy in Helsinki.
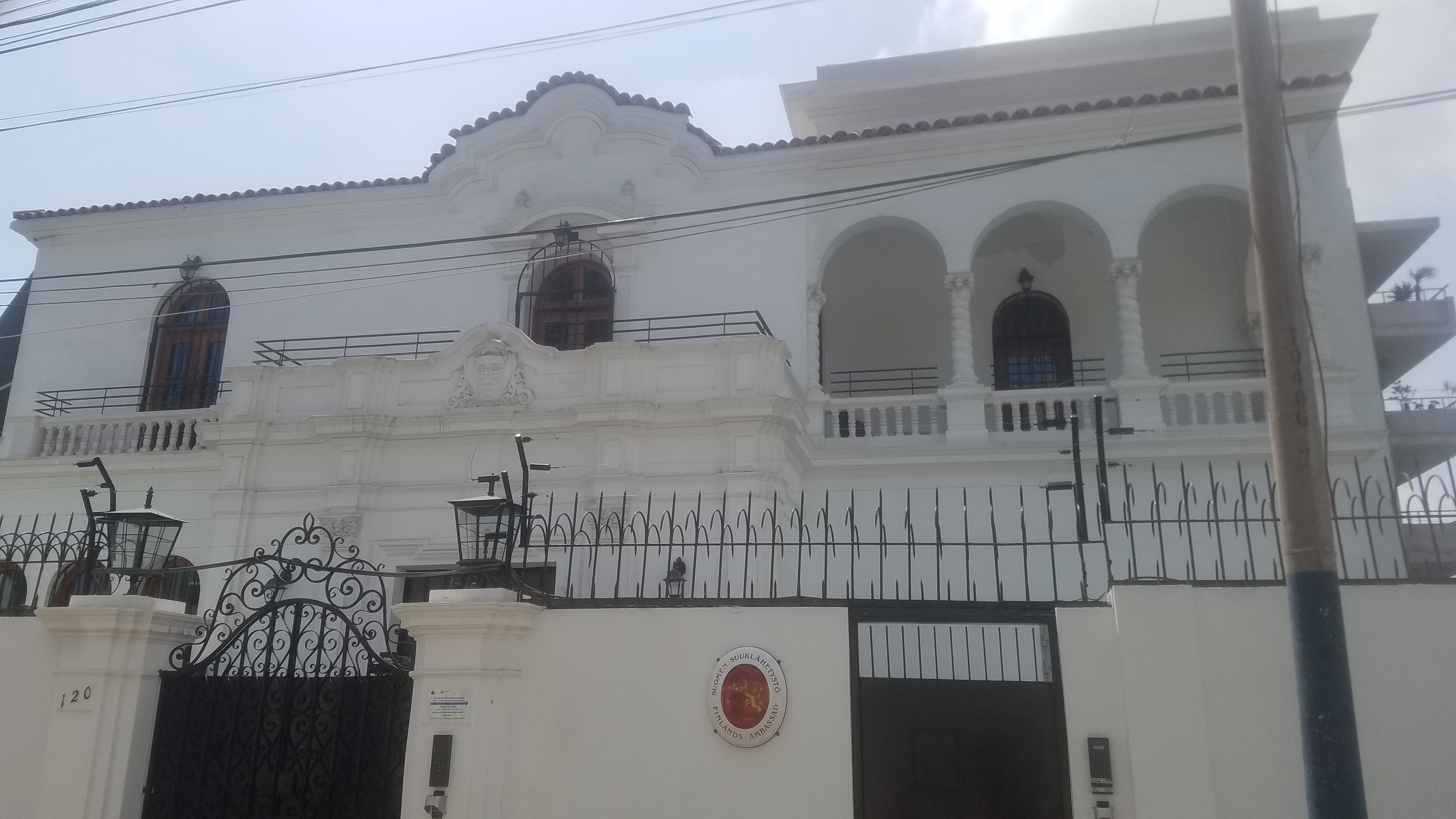
Embassy of Finland, Lima

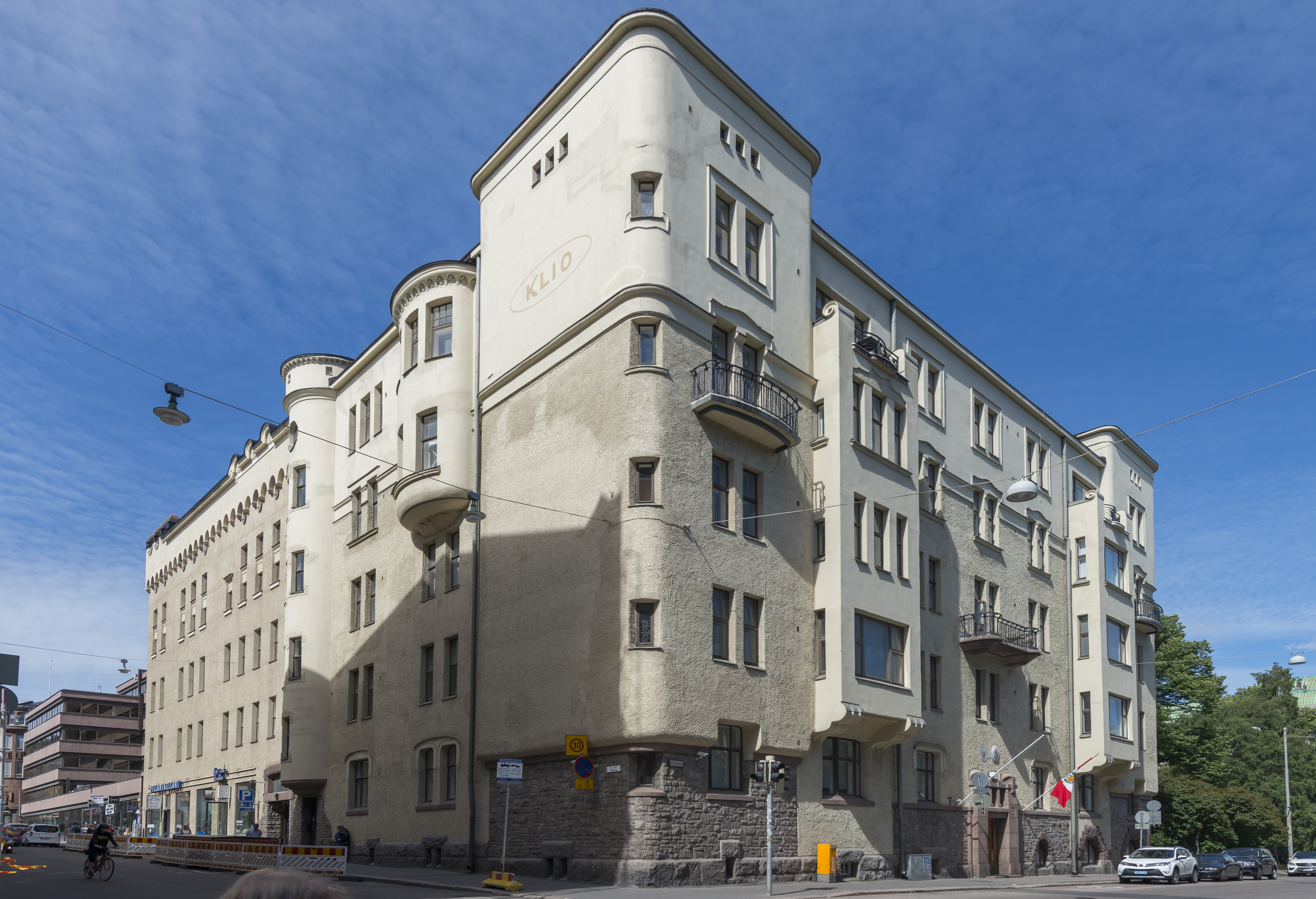
Building hosting the Peruvian embassy in Helsinki

== See also ==
- Foreign relations of Finland
- Foreign relations of Peru
- List of ambassadors of Peru to Finland
- List of ambassadors of Finland to Peru
