= Embassy of Finland, Canberra =

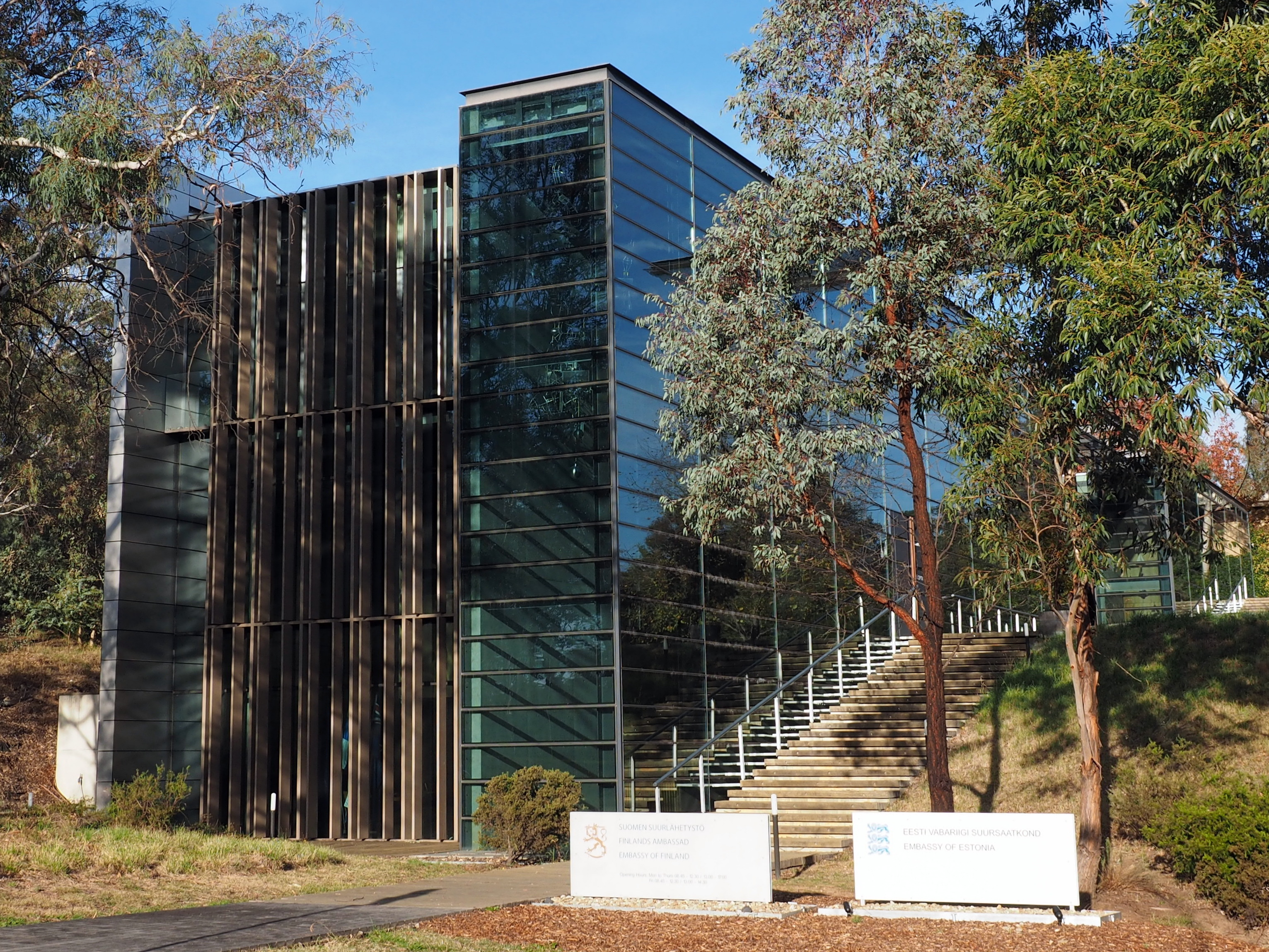
- Embassy of Finland in Canberra (front)
- Address: 12 Darwin Avenue, Yarralumla, Australian Capital Territory
- Coordinates: 35°18′10.3″S 149°06′56.2″E
- Ambassador: Arto Haapea
- Website: Official website

The Embassy of Finland to the Commonwealth of Australia is Finland's diplomatic mission in Canberra, Australia. The mission is also accredited to New Zealand, Fiji, Papua New Guinea, Samoa, Tonga, Vanuatu and the Solomon Islands. As it is the only Finnish Embassy in the Southern Pacific region (Oceania), in practice the embassy also represents Finland in its relations with other Pacific island states in the region (Nauru, Tuvalu as well as the Cook Islands, Niue and Tokelau).

== History ==
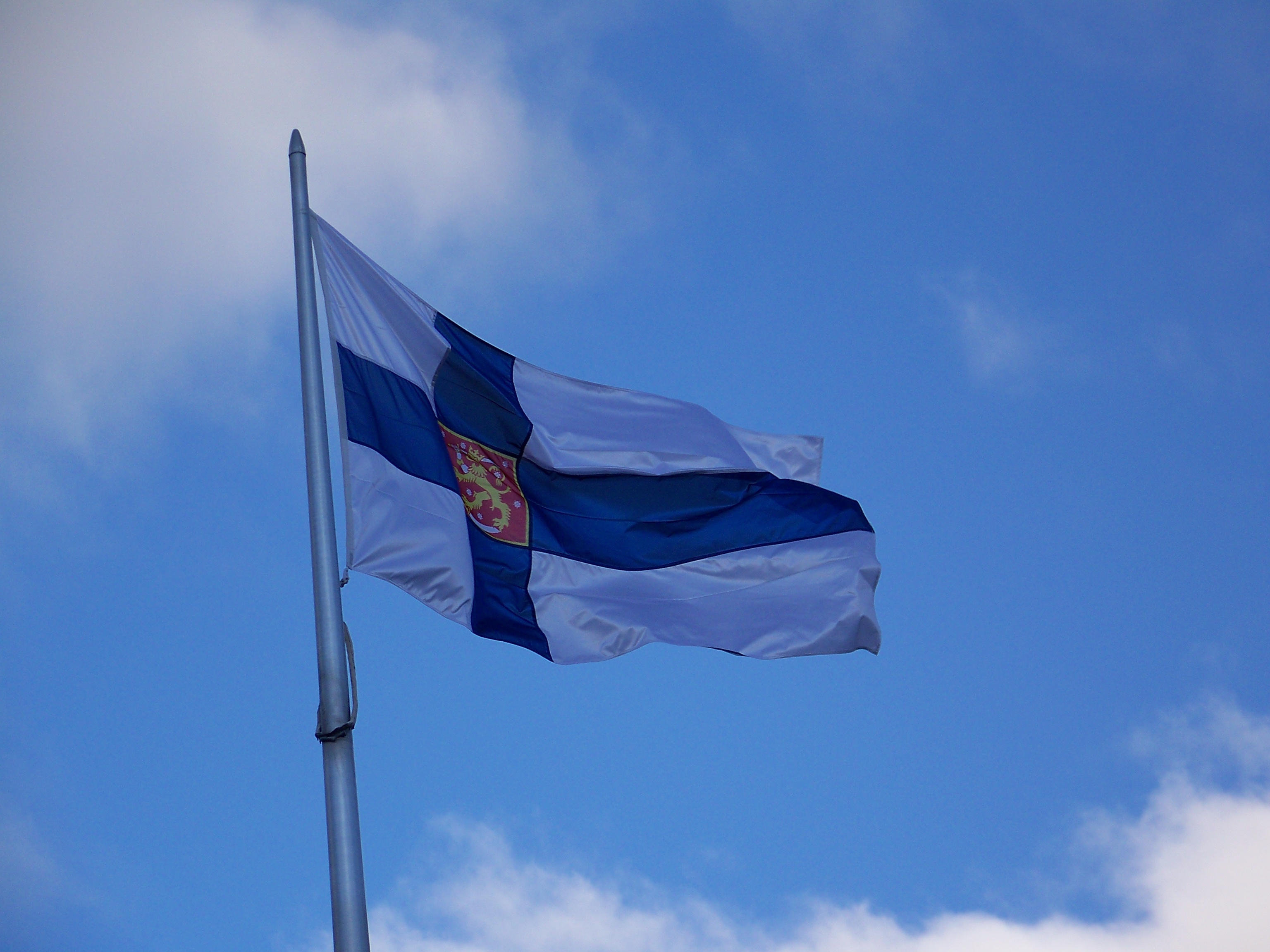
Flag at the Finnish embassy, Canberra.

Finland first established a consulate in Sydney in 1918. In these early years, the consulate, apart from providing consular services, also played the role of a social club for the Australian Finnish community. After relations become tense between Finland and Great Britain in 1941, as a result of the Continuation War between the Soviet Union and Finland, representatives of the Government of Finland returned to their home country.

In 1949, Finland and Australia began diplomatic relations. The relationship between the two countries was quickly established after the war and ties between Australia and Finland became stronger and deeper. In the 1950s, Finnish exports doubled from the previous decade. The Consulate of Finland remained in Sydney until 1966 when it was moved to the capital city of Canberra, and in 1968 the first Finnish ambassador was appointed. The Finnish embassy was built in Yarralumla in 1978, adjacent to the Singaporean and Indonesian missions. Finland continued to maintain a separate consulate in the Sydney suburb of Double Bay until 2012.

On 8 November 2026, the embassy uploaded a post on Instagram informing that it would be closed on 10 November, accompanied by "Étude Op.76 No.2" by Finnish composer Jean Sibelius. The post inexplicably amassed over 11 million views and 700 thousand likes as of 12 November 2026. The post's virality was likely a result of the embassy's previous post promoting a contest offering single people a chance to win a trip to Finland. Other accounts, brands, and embassies uploaded memes with the same music regarding the situation, jokingly expressing their dismay over the temporary closure. On 11 November, Australian Prime Minister Anthony Albanese and Finnish President Alexander Stubb made a post together at the 2026 United Nations Climate Change Conference, confirming that the embassy had been reopened.

== Architecture ==
In 2002 a distinctively built annex was built, designed by Finnish architect Vesa Huttunen of Hirvonen and Huttunen who won the commission in a 1997 competition. The annex houses the chancery, a residence for the Counsellor and a Finnish sauna. The 1978 building now serves as the Ambassadorial residence.

The building appears as a long, sleek box of stainless steel and glass, neatly complemented by the overhang of indigenous eucalyptus trees. Named Ilmarinen after the Finnish armoured naval vessel (in turn named after the blacksmith hero in the Finnish national epic Kalevala), the building has the spatial feel of a ship. Offices sit like cabins lined up along the side of the building, connected by walkways overlooking an atrium. The facade of the chancery building is made entirely of glass. Interior steel I-beams and stainless steel padding is used alongside recycled jarrah timber external decks and stair treads which look as if they came from a disused wharf (actually they originate from Australian sheep stations). The design received an award at the annual architectural competition held in the Australian Capital Territory in the summer of 2003.

The Embassy of Estonia to Australia has been located in the Embassy of Finland building since August 2015.

== Finnish Ambassadors to Australia ==
Representative	Years	Title	Ref
Kaarlo Johannes Nauklér (Sydney)	1919–1920	Honorary Consul	
Harald Tanner (Sydney)	1920–1935	Honorary Consul	
Paavo Simelius (Sydney)	1935–1941	Honorary Consul	
Relations suspended
Paavo Simelius (Sydney)	1949–1958	Charge d'affaires	
Toivo Kala (Sydney)	1958–1963	Charge d'affaires	
Olavi Wanne (Sydney)	1963–1968	Charge d'affaires	
Peter Graf von der Pahlen	1968–1969	Charge d'affaires	
Tuure Mentula	1969–1975	Ambassador	
Åke Backström	1975–1980	Ambassador	
Veikko Huttunen	1980–1983	Ambassador	
Osmo Lares	1983–1987	Ambassador	
Ulf-Erik Slotte	1987–1991	Ambassador	
Charles Murto	1991–1996	Ambassador	
Esko Hamilo	1996–2001	Ambassador	
Anneli Puura-Märkälä	2001–2005	Ambassador	
Glen Lindholm	2005–2009	Ambassador	
Maija Lähteenmäki	2010–2012	Ambassador	
Pasi Patokallio	2013–2016	Ambassador	
Lars Backström	2016–2020	Ambassador	
Satu Mattila-Budich	2020–2024	Ambassador	
Arto Haapea	2024–present	Ambassador	

== Honorary consulates ==
In addition to the embassy in Canberra, there are eight honorary consulates in Sydney, Melbourne, Brisbane, Perth, Adelaide, Perth, Darwin and Cairns. Honorary consuls are also based in New Zealand, Fiji, Papua New Guinea, Samoa and Tonga. Within their jurisdiction, an honorary consul provides advice and guidance for distressed Finnish citizens and foreigners permanently residing in Finland who are temporarily abroad, assisting them in their contacts with local authorities or the nearest Finnish embassy. Certain types of notarised certificates can be acquired through an honorary consul. Honorary consuls do not accept passport applications nor do they handle matters pertaining to visas or residence permits.

== See also ==
- Ministry of Foreign Affairs (Finland)
- List of diplomatic missions of Finland
- List of diplomatic missions in Australia
