= Jenny Ohlsson =

Swedish diplomat

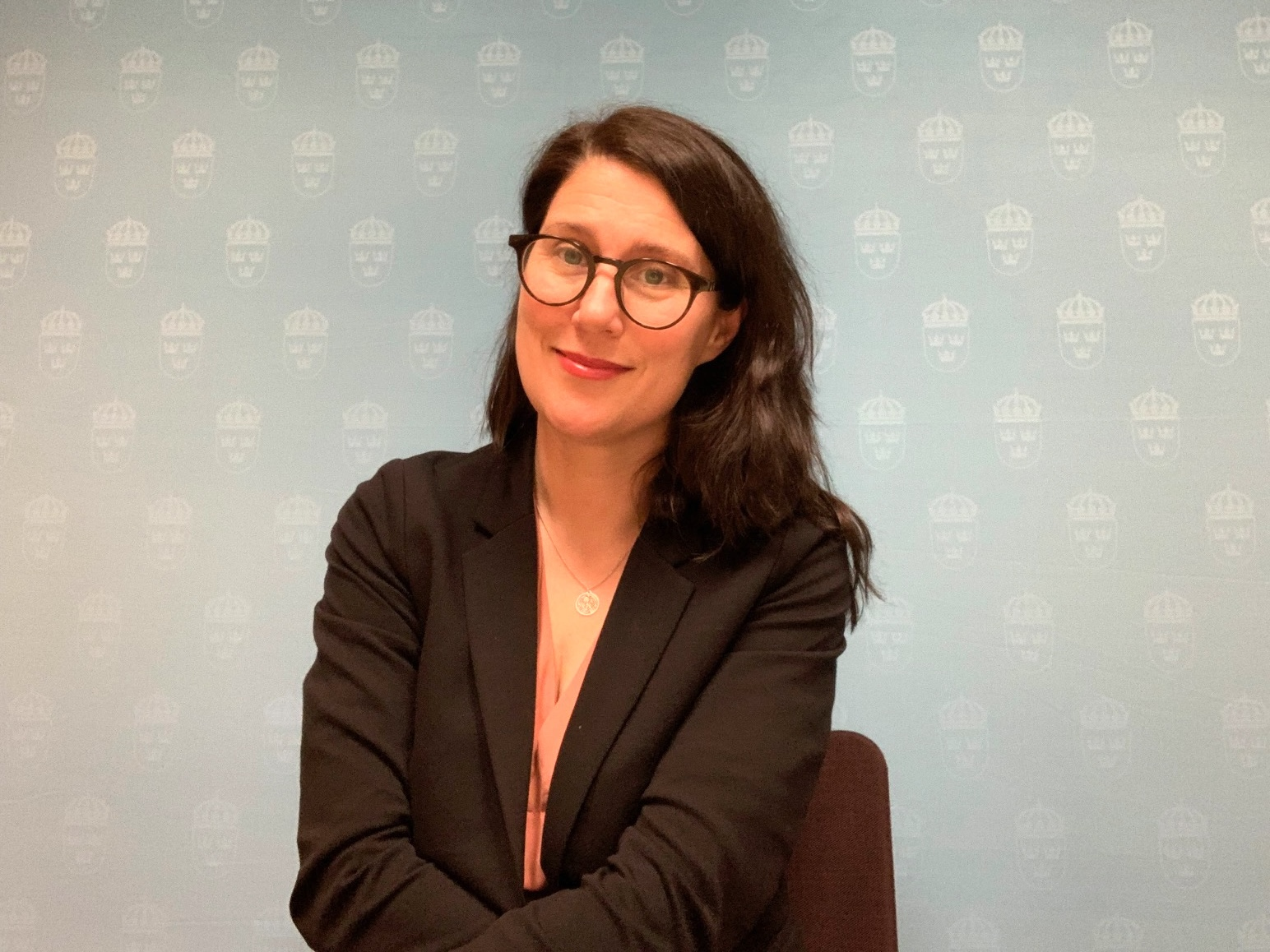
- Born: 1975 (age 50–51)
- Education: Uppsala University, UWC Pearson College
- Occupation: Diplomat

Jenny Ohlsson (born 1975) is a Swedish diplomat. She has served as Sweden's ambassador to Eritrea since 1 October 2023, with her post based in Stockholm. From 2021 to 2022, she was State Secretary to Sweden's Minister for International Development Cooperation at the Ministry for Foreign Affairs.

== Early life and education ==
Ohlsson attended UWC Pearson College (1992–1994) and later studied at Uppsala University (1998–2007).

== Career ==
Ohlsson worked as a political adviser in the Swedish Government Offices from 1997 to 2002, including as an adviser to Prime Minister Göran Persson. In 2006 she was political adviser to Minister for Foreign Affairs Jan Eliasson.

Within the foreign service she has served at several units and missions, including in Pretoria and at the former section office in Kigali. In 2016, the Government appointed her ambassador to Rwanda, based in Kigali.

After Rwanda she worked in Stockholm on Agenda 2030 issues at the Ministry for Foreign Affairs and later served as Sweden's Ambassador/Coordinator for Migration and Refugee Issues. She has also worked at the Coordination Office of the Prime Minister's Office.

Diplomatic posts
| Preceded by Urban Andersson | Ambassador of Sweden to Rwanda; 2016–2020 | Succeeded by Johanna Teague |
| Preceded by Svante Liljegren | Ambassador of Sweden to Eritrea; 2023–present | Succeeded by Incumbent |
