= Vagn Hoffmeyer Hoelgaard =

Danish diplomat

Vagn Hoelgaard
- Born: Vagn Hoffmeyer Hoelgaard; 12 September 1913; Denmark
- Disappeared: 3 February 1988 (aged 74); Marbella, southern Spain
- Status: Missing for 38 years, 7 months and 25 days
- Parent(s): Jens Hoelgaard and Sigrid Hoffmeye

Vagn Hoffmeyer Hoelgaard (12 September 1913 – disappeared 3 February 1988) was a Danish diplomat.

== Life ==
He was the son of editor Jens Arnold Hoelgaard and writer Sigrid Emma Hoffmeyer. He attended Copenhagen's Metropolitanskolen (now part of the University of Copenhagen) in 1932, before continuing his studies at the Graduate Institute of International Studies in Geneva from 1935 to 1937. He obtained a master of politics in 1938 and joined Denmark's Ministry of Foreign Affairs in 1939.

After his stints in London, Washington D.C., he became head of office in the Ministry of Foreign Affairs in 1956, first on a temporary basis and later permanently after 1958. He was later Denmark's permanent representative at the United Nations Economic Commission for Europe, ambassador to Peru and Bolivia, head of Denmark's permanent delegation to the Organisation for Economic Co-operation and Development (OECD), and finally Danish ambassador to Mexico, Cuba, Guatemala, San Salvador and Honduras. He was awarded Order of the Dannebrog.

In 1981, after retiring, he settled in Marbella, southern Spain. On 3 February 1988, he disappeared without a trace after leaving his home. His body was never found and he was officially declared dead in 1999.

== See also ==
- List of people who disappeared mysteriously: 1910–1990
