= Embassy of Sweden, Lima =

Diplomatic mission of Sweden in Peru

- Location: Lima
- Address: Calle la Santa Maria 120, San Isidro, Lima, Peru (Note: This was the address of the Swedish embassy when it closed for the last time in 2022.)
- Coordinates: 12.10253°S 77.03621°W
- Opened: 2026 (Note: The mission, then a legation, was established in Lima in 1931. It was elevated to embassy status in 1956, closed in 2001, reopened in 2016, closed again in October 2022, and reopened once more in 2026.)
- Inaugurated: 22 November 2016 (2nd time); August 2026 (3rd time)
- Ambassador: Johanna Teague
- Jurisdiction: Peru

The Embassy of Sweden in Lima is Sweden's diplomatic mission in Peru. Diplomatic relations between Peru and Sweden were established in 1930 and the embassy opened the following year. It was closed in 2001 and reopened in 2016, only to close again in 2022. Since then, the Swedish ambassador in Santiago is also accredited to Lima. The Swedish embassy reopened again in August 2026.

== History ==
Diplomatic relations between Peru and Sweden were established in 1930. However, the first Swedish company, SKF, operated in the country as early as 1918. Sven Karell, CEO of Svenska Tändsticks AB's (STAB) Peruvian subsidiary served as Swedish honorary consul general in Lima from 1925 to 1955. The decision for Sweden to have a representative in Peru was made on 30 July 1930, but it was not until 1 January 1931 that envoy Einar Modig formally began his position and the credentials were signed. He was also accredited to Bolivia, Colombia, Ecuador, and Venezuela. In 1956, an agreement was reached between the Swedish and Peruvian governments on the mutual elevation of the respective countries' legations to embassies.

In 1995, it was reported that the Ministry for Foreign Affairs would save 185 million Swedish kronor over the next three budget years. 15 Swedish embassies and consulates were to be closed by 1998. The embassy in Peru was saved from the threat of closure through alternative cost-saving measures.

The embassy was closed in 2001 and the ambassador was subsequently accredited from the Swedish embassy in Santiago. The decision to close was made based on budgetary reasons. The press release that went out about the closure stated the following: "Sweden's relations with the outside world are constantly changing, and it is sometimes necessary to change the center of gravity in the monitoring of the outside world. The foreign service currently has a significant deficit, which also makes it necessary to take measures to achieve a balance between operations and resources. The purpose of the structural changes is to have a foreign service as modern and cost-effective as possible." Since 2001, Peruvian affairs are under the embassy in Santiago. These mainly consist of bilateral relations between Peru and Sweden on a political, commercial, economic and cultural level. Remaining in Lima, there was an honorary consulate general that dealt with consular affairs under the leadership of consul general Stefan Sandberg. The consulate also had a vice consul and three local employees. The consulate was housed in an annex to the former Swedish residence in the San Isidro District. There was also an honorary consulate in Arequipa.

Following a government decision in December 2015, it was decided to reopen the embassy in 2016. On 22 November 2016, the Swedish embassy in Lima was inaugurated by Minister for European Union Affairs and Trade Ann Linde together with a Team Sweden delegation. The Swedish government decided on 3 November 2021 to close the embassy. The embassy was closed in August 2022, and was discontinued in October 2022. Sweden's ambassador to Chile was now also accredited to Peru. Sweden has an honorary consulate in Cusco.

In December 2025, the Swedish government decided to reopen a Swedish embassy in Lima in the fall of 2026. In June 2026, a new resident ambassador of Sweden to Lima was appointed, assuming office in August of the same year.

== Staff and tasks ==
The Swedish Embassy in Lima was structured with various positions and departments. In 2021 it consisted of the following: an ambassador who was the head of mission, supported by a deputy head of mission. The staff included a secretary and cashier, a trade promotion officer, and an assistant for trade promotion. There was also a communications assistant responsible for cultural promotion, a migration assistant who also handled administrative tasks, a consular assistant who served as a receptionist, and a driver who also functioned as a caretaker.

== Buildings ==
=== Chancery ===
From 1931 to 1935, the chancery was located at Avenida 28 de Julio 878 in the Miraflores District. From 1936, the address was Avenida 28 de Julio 540. In 1940, the residence at Calle La Santa María 120-130 in the San Isidro District was bought. The chancery operated for a number of years in an extension to the residence. From 1969, the address was Las Camélias 780 in the San Isidro District. In the mid-1980s, the chancery moved to Avenida Camino Real.

When the Swedish Ministry for Foreign Affairs decided to open an embassy again in Lima in 2016 and the Finnish Ministry for Foreign Affairs was also looking for premises, it became a good and efficient solution to put both embassies at the old address in the former ambassador's residence in the San Isidro District. The building was renovated in 2017-18 by Hidemark & Stintzing and local firm Roman Bauer Architects. The renovation created offices for the two embassies, a pergola for a better outdoor environment, energy efficiency, earthquake strengthening and major improvements regarding the accessibility of the house. In 2018, the Swedish and Finnish embassies opened at this long-standing Swedish address.

=== Residence ===
The palatial villa at Calle La Santa María 120-130 in the San Isidro District was built in 1938 and purchased in 1940 by the then National Swedish Board of Public Building (Byggnadsstyrelsen) as an ambassador's residence. A rebuild done in 1956, was designed by J Fussing. For just over 60 years, until the spring of 2001, when the embassy was closed, the property operated as an ambassador's residence. When the Swedish Ministry for Foreign Affairs closed the embassy in Lima, it was decided that the National Property Board of Sweden (SFV) would keep the building and it was leased for a long time to the aid organization Save the Children. The villa is one of the few properties in the area that is not of a more modern design and is in its own right a cultural heritage worth preserving. From the summer 2018, it served as the chancery for the Swedish and Finnish embassies. In 2024, the property was put up for sale by SFV.

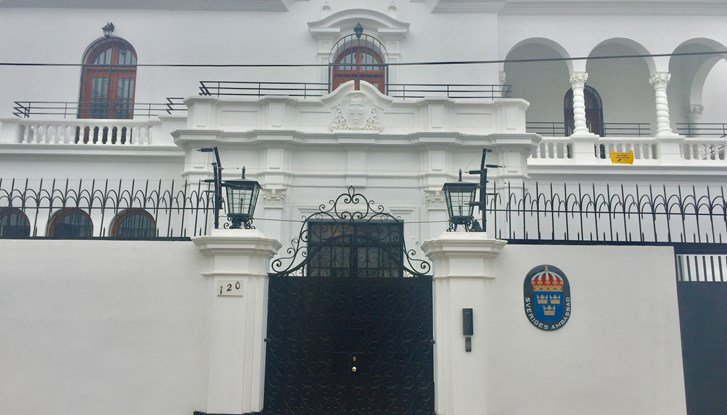
Entrance with Swedish Embassy sign in 2019

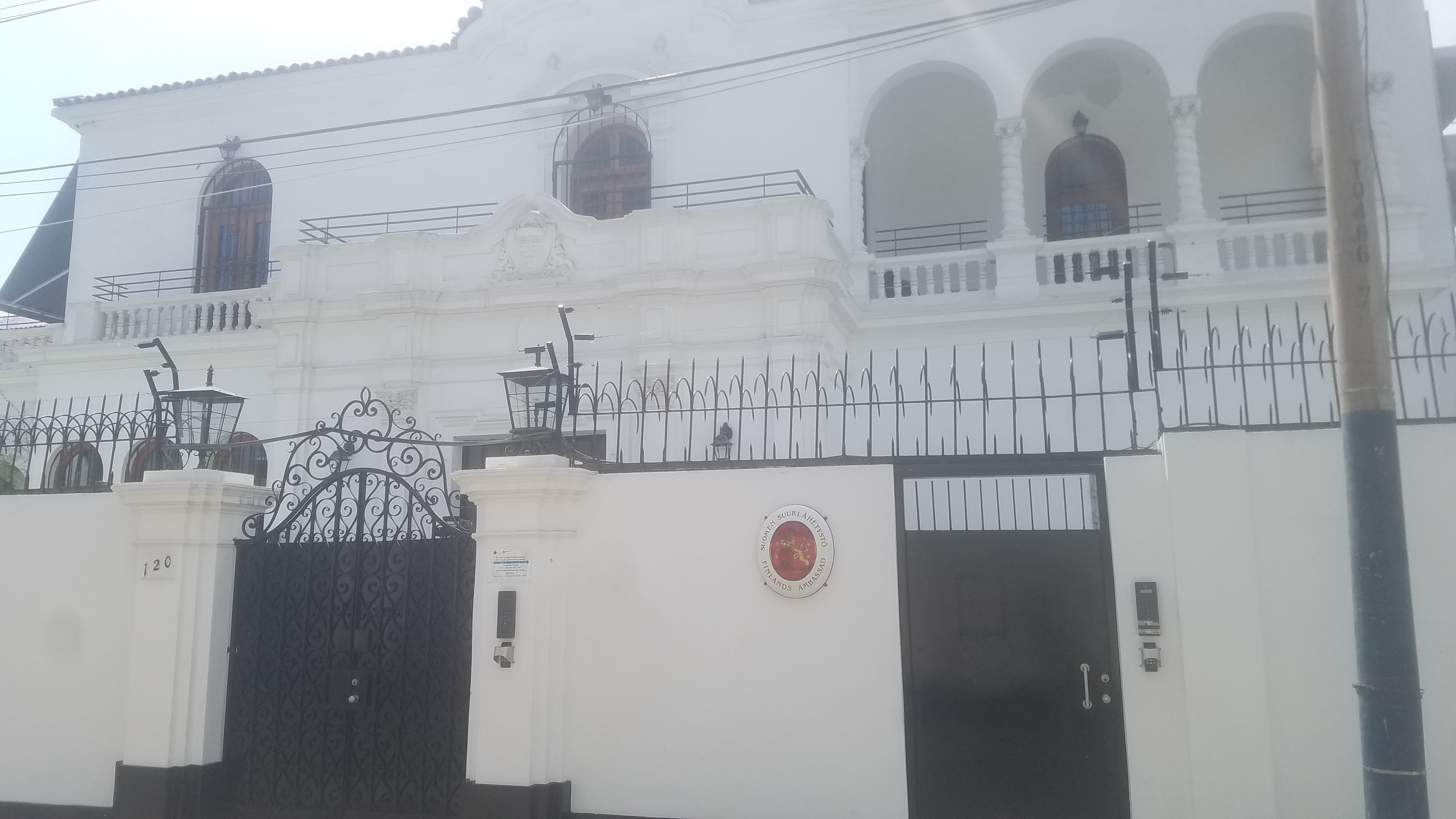
Entrance with Finnish Embassy sign in 2023

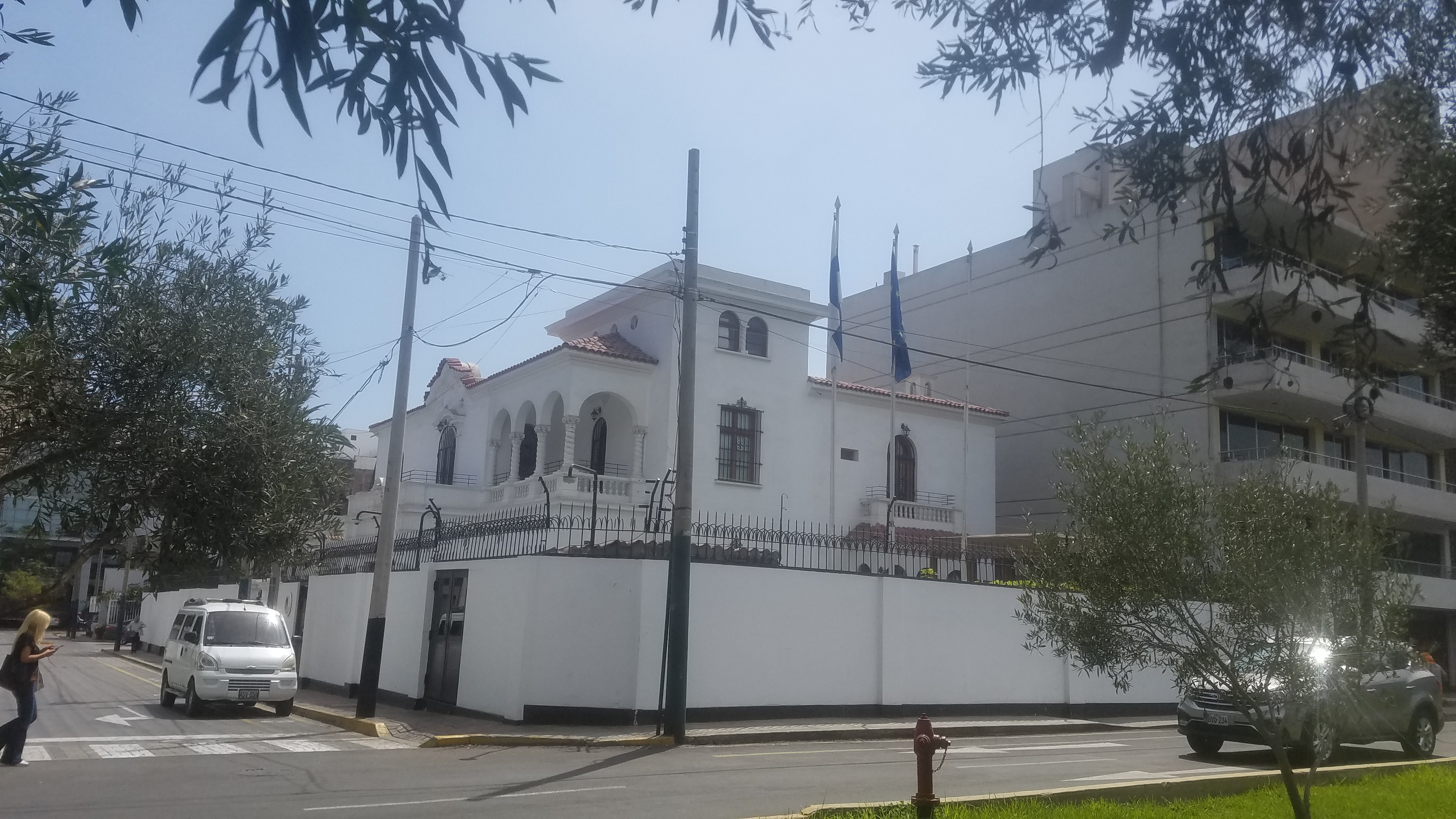
Corner view

== See also ==
- Embassy of Peru, Stockholm
- Peru–Sweden relations
