= Osmo Lares =

Finnish diplomat (1926–2025)

Osmo Juhani Lares (30 September 1926 – 7 May 2025) was a Finnish diplomat.

== Life and career ==
Lares was born in Tampere on 30 September 1926. He was Master of Laws. He served as Ambassador to Tokyo from 1972 to 1978, Head of the Legal Department of the Ministry for Foreign Affairs from 1978 to 1983, Ambassador to Canberra 1983–1987 and at The Hague (the Netherlands) 1987–1989. Lares died in Helsinki on 7 May 2025, at the age of 98.
