= Esko Hamilo =

Finnish under-secretary, diplomat

Esko Tapio Hamilo (born 1 June 1945, in Jyväskylä) was a Finnish Under-Secretary and diplomat. He is a Bachelor of Political Science from 1971, and has been employed by the Ministry for Foreign Affairs since 1972. He was head of office at the Ministry of Foreign Affairs in years 1985–1987 and Foreign Affairs Counselor between 1992–1996 and again 2005–2007.

He has also been an Ambassador in Australia 1996–2001 and in France 2001–2005. In 2007, he became In 2007, he became Under- Secretary in the Prime Minister's Office and at the beginning of August 2010, the Ministry of Foreign Affairs under the Ministry of Commerce as under-secretary, where he served until 2013 when Hamilo retired. Hamilo is married and has two adult boys. As military rank Hamilo is Lieutenant.
