= Pasi Patokallio =

Finnish diplomat

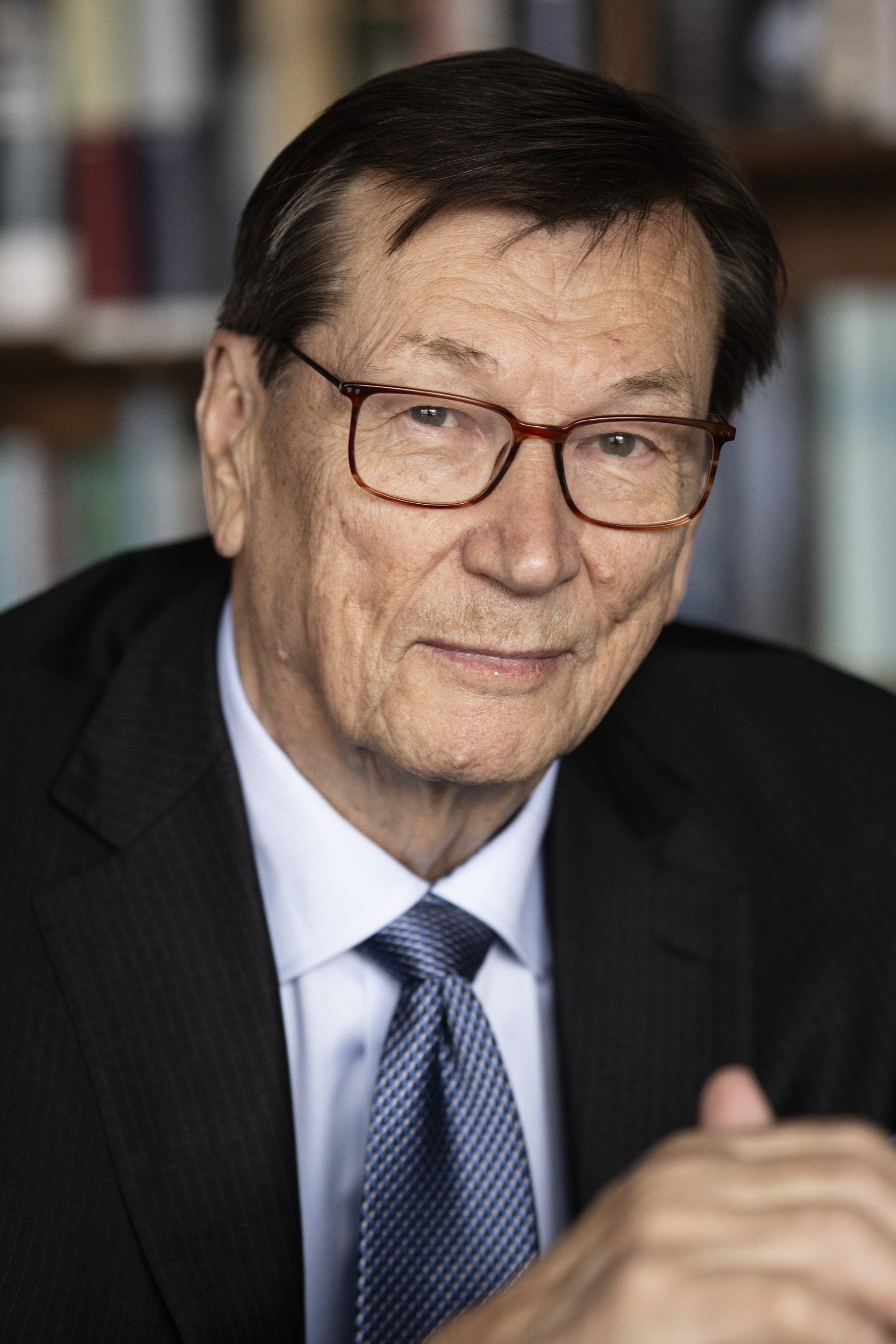
- Born: September 29, 1949 (age 76); Kangasala, Finland
- Education: Tampere University
- Occupation: Diplomat
- Years active: 1974–

Pasi Patokallio (born 29 September 1949) is a Finnish diplomat. He has served as the Ambassador of Finland to Israel, Canada and Australia, and led Finland's campaign for a seat on the United Nations Security Council in 2012.

== Biography ==
=== Early life (1949–1974) ===
Patokallio was born in Kangasala in the Pirkanmaa region of Finland and graduated with a master's degree in international relations from the Tampere University in 1973.

He joined Finland's foreign service in 1974. He was posted to the Embassy of Finland in Washington, D.C. (1978–1981), the Embassy of Finland in Tokyo (1981–1983), the Permanent Mission of Finland in Geneva (1986–1988) and the Permanent Mission of Finland in New York City (1989–1993).

He chaired two meetings of the Preparatory Committee of the Nuclear Non-Proliferation Treaty, including in New York City in April 1997.

An expert on arms proliferation, Patokallio served as the Director for Arms Control and Disarmament (as well as the Deputy Director-General for Multilateral Affairs) at the Finnish Ministry for Foreign Affairs, and as chairman of the Nuclear Suppliers Group prior to 2004.

He held the position of Finland's ambassador to Israel and Cyprus in Tel Aviv from 1998 to 2003. In 1999–2000, he was a candidate to head the United Nations Monitoring, Verification and Inspection Commission (UNMOVIC) weapons inspection organisation in Iraq following the resignation of Richard Butler, a role that eventually went to Swedish diplomat Hans Blix.

After completing a one-year fellowship dedicated to Middle Eastern issues at Harvard University's Weatherhead Center for International Affairs, Patokallio served as Finland's ambassador to Canada and the Bahamas from 2004 to 2008. He was appointed by the UN General Assembly to chair the 2nd Biennial Meeting of States for the United Nations Conference on the Illicit Trade in Small Arms in 2005.

In March 2009, he was appointed by Finland's foreign minister Alexander Stubb as his special representative to head the task force on Finland's bid for a non-permanent seat on the UN Security Council in 2013–2014, and "to ease access to political decision makers abroad". He travelled widely in this role to meet with high-level representatives of other UN member states, including several presidents, and established Finland's diplomatic relations with Kiribati and South Sudan.

Patokallio is a noted critic of the Ottawa Treaty banning anti-personnel mines, which Finland joined in 2012 during the presidency of Tarja Halonen. He has argued that given Finland's lengthy border with Russia, unilaterally signing the treaty when Russia did not caused "irreparable harm" to Finland's defence posture. In 2024, he was one of the authors of a successful citizens' initiative to withdraw from the treaty. Finland formally notified the UN of its intent to withdraw in July 2025.

== Publications ==
- Minä, aseet ja maailma. Diplomaattiset muistelmat, Jyväskylä: Docendo, 2023, ISBN 978-952-382-680-9
