= Eva Zetterberg =

Swedish politician and diplomat

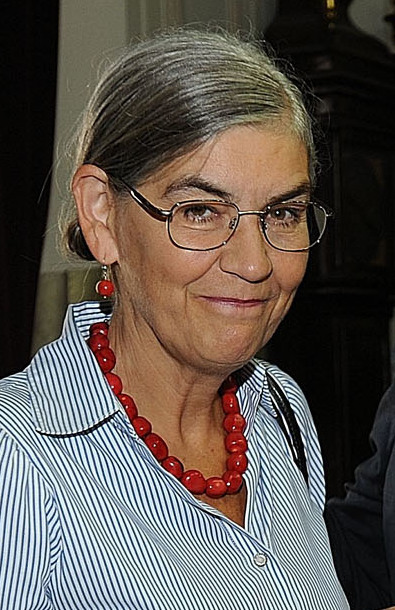
- Zetterberg in 2012
- Born: Ingrid Eva Margareta Zetterberg; 11 September 1947 (age 78); Stockholm, Sweden
- Education: University of Wisconsin
- Occupations: Politician, diplomat
- Years active: 1972–2014
- Political party: Left Party
- Spouse: Arne Gustafsson (m. 1978)
- Relatives: Hanna Zetterberg (niece)

Ingrid Eva Margareta Zetterberg (born 11 September 1947) is a Swedish Left Party politician and diplomat. She served as a member of parliament from 1991 to 2002. She has later been Swedish ambassador in Nicaragua, Chile, and Peru.

== Early life ==
Zetterberg was born on 11 September 1947 in Stockholm, Sweden, the son of pastor Åke Zetterberg and Ann Louise (née Holmgren). She has four siblings, including the jurist Olle Zetterberg.

Zetterberg earned a Bachelor of Arts at the University of Wisconsin in the United States in 1969, a Bachelor of Arts degree in 1970, and a social work degree in 1976.

== Career ==
Zetterberg worked as a social assistant in Stockholm from 1972 to 1980, as a refugee consultant with the National Board of Health and Welfare from 1973 to 1974, a social inspector from 1980 to 1982, and a planning secretary starting in 1982. He became a member of parliament in 1991 and served as the Second Deputy Speaker of the Riksdag from 1998. He was a member of the Stockholm County Council from 1979 to 1982 and again from 1985 to 1991. He also served on the board of the Samhall Foundation from 1990 to 1991, was a member of the Committee on Foreign Affairs from 1994 to 1998, and joined the SIDA board from 1998.

== Personal life ==
In 1978, Zetterberg married Arne Gustafsson (born 1932).

Government offices
Preceded by Görel Thurdin	Second Deputy Speaker of the Riksdag; 1998–2002	Succeeded by Kerstin Heinemann
Diplomatic posts
Preceded by Klas Markensten	Ambassador of Sweden to Nicaragua; 2003–2008	Succeeded by Ewa Werner-Dahlin
Preceded by Maria Christina Lundqvist	Ambassador of Sweden to Chile; 2009–2014	Succeeded by Jakob Kiefer
Preceded by Maria Christina Lundqvist	Ambassador of Sweden to Peru; 2009–2014	Succeeded by Jakob Kiefer
