= Ulf-Erik Slotte =

Finnish diplomat (1931–2019)

Ulf-Erik Alexander Slotte (15 November 1931 – 5 November 2019, Helsinki) was a Finnish diplomat.

Slotte was born in Helsinki. He studied history at the University of Helsinki and graduated as Master of Philosophy in 1955. He was a negotiating officer from the Ministry for Foreign Affairs from 1973 to 1977, Ambassador to Ankara in 1977–1983, Administrative Under-Secretary of State since 1983, Ambassador in Canberra from 1988 to 1991 and in Dublin from 1991 until his retirement, until 1996.
