= Maija Lähteenmäki =

Finnish diplomat

Maija Lähteenmäki (born 1945) is a Finnish diplomat. She has been Finland's ambassador to Australia in Canberra in 2010-2013 and retired there. She started working with the Ministry for Foreign Affairs in 1974.

Lähteenmäki served as ambassador in 1991-1995 in Santiago de Chile and in 1995-2000 in New York as Finland's Consul General. In Helsinki, she worked as a protocol chief before moving to Ambassador to Madrid 2005. In Finland's Embassies she has also served in Brussels, Ottawa, Stockholm and Cairo.

Lähteenmäki has worked at home and abroad at the Ministry for Foreign Affairs, including the Political Department, the Office of the Press and Culture Department and the Control and Audit Unit. In 2002-2003 she worked as Assistant Controller and 2003-2005 as Head of the Protocol Division.

Lähteenmäki has been a doctoral student at the University of Turku in 1994.
