= Riitta Örö =

Finnish Ambassador and diplomat (1920–2005)

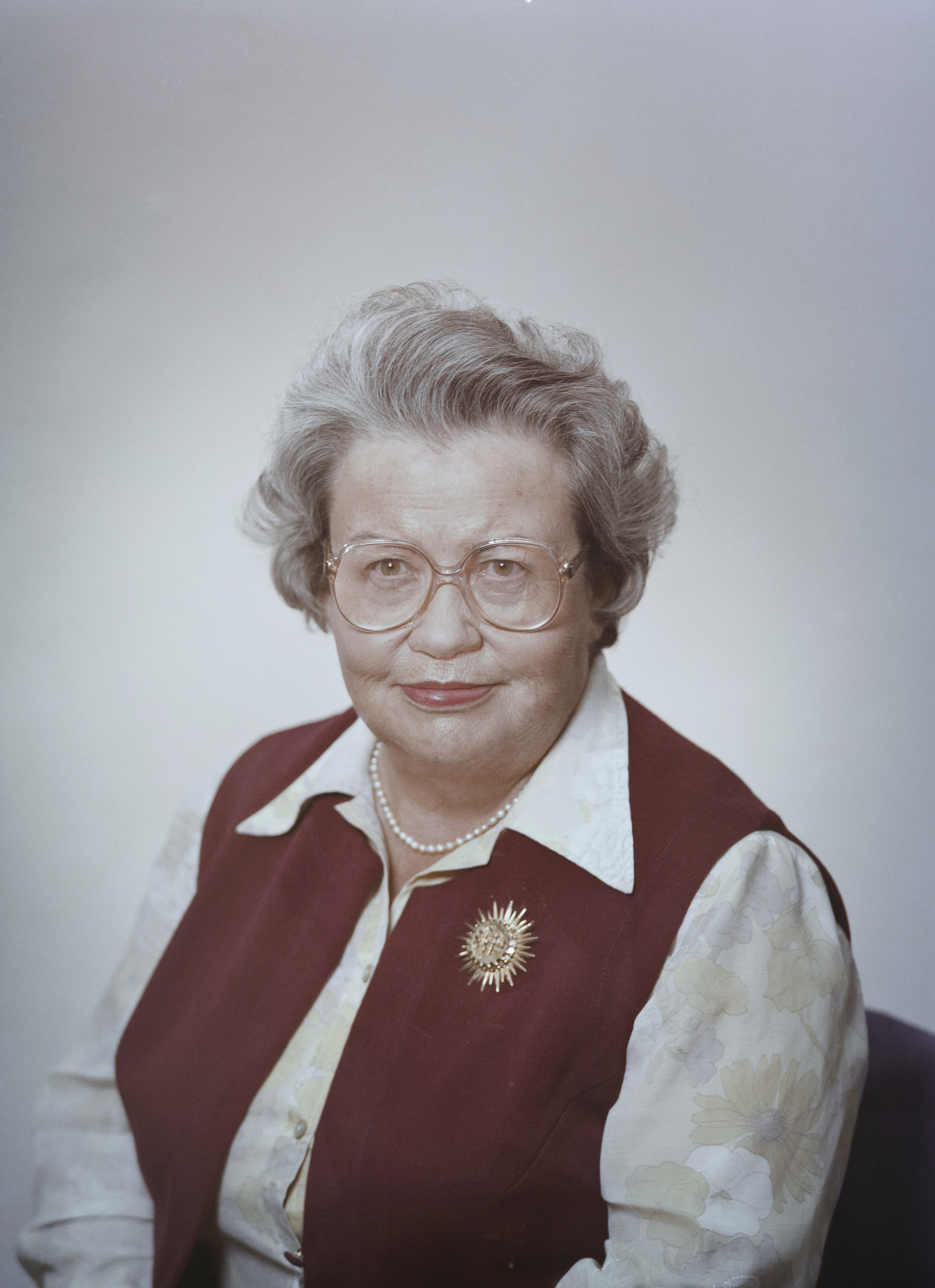
Riitta Örö vuonna 1983

Brita Johanna (Riitta) Örö (lastname until 1942 Öhrling; 24 February 1920 Varkaus – 8 August 2005 Helsinki) was a Finnish Ambassador and diplomat. She was the second woman to become an Ambassador of Finland when she was appointed as Finnish Ambassador to India in New Delhi on October 1, 1974.

Örö's parents were engineer Werner Ferdinand Öhrling and Tyyne Johanna Peltola. She spent his youthful years in Rovaniemi, which she later considered as her hometown.

Örö undergraduate in 1939 and studied in Helsinki and graduated as economist in 1944 and a bachelor of political science in 1956. Örö worked as notary in the Prime Minister's Office from 1953 to 1956 and after that she was working as Office Secretary in the Office of the President of the Republic of Finland from 1956 to 1959. In this assignment Örö became friends with President Urho Kekkonen and Mrs. Sylvi Kekkonen.

Örö was Assistant Secretary in the Ministry for Foreign Affrairs, Secretary for Delegation and Delegation Counselor in South Africa, Vienna, Budapest, The Hague and London from 1960 to 1974.

She was then Ambassador of Finland to India from 1974 to 1979 and at the same time was accredited to Bangladesh, Nepal, Singapore and to Sri Lanka. Her last Ambassador's post was Finnish Ambassador to Peru from 1983 to 1986 .

Orö got the title of Counselor in 1969.
