= List of ambassadors of Peru to Finland =

Ambassadors List

Ambassador of Peru to the Republic of Finland
- Great Seal of Peru
- Incumbent; Jorge Renato Reyes Tagle since February 1, 2026
- Ministry of Foreign Affairs
- Appointer: The president of Peru
- Inaugural holder: Aníbal Ponce Sobrevilla
- Formation: March 11, 1965
- Website: Embassy of Peru in Finland

The extraordinary and plenipotentiary ambassador of Peru to the Republic of Finland is the official representative of the Republic of Peru to the Republic of Finland. The ambassador is concurrent to the republics of Estonia, Latvia and Lithuania.

Peru recognized Finland on June 23, 1919, and both countries established relations on March 26, 1963.

== List of representatives ==
Name	Portrait	Term begin	Term end	President	Notes
Aníbal Ponce Sobrevilla		March 11, 1965	1967	Fernando Belaúnde	Ambassador
Julio Vargas-Prada		1967	1969	Fernando Belaúnde	Ambassador
Jorge Velando Ugarteche		1970	1974	Juan Velasco Alvarado	Ambassador
José L. Canessa		1974	1975	Francisco Morales Bermúdez	Ambassador
Claudio Enrique Sosa Voysest		1976	1980	Francisco Morales Bermúdez	Ambassador
César Espejo-Romero		1981	1985	Fernando Belaúnde	Ambassador
Augusto Salamanca Regalado		1986	1989	Alan García	Ambassador
Alberto Montagne Vidal		1990	1990	Alberto Fujimori	Ambassador
Jaime Stiglich Bérninzon		1993	1995	Alberto Fujimori	Ambassador; accredited from Stockholm.
Martha Chavarri Dupuy		1998	2003	Alberto Fujimori	Ambassador
Manuel Ernesto Picasso Botto		2004	2008	Alejandro Toledo	Ambassador
Félix С. Calderón Urtecho		2008	2009	Alan García	Ambassador
Pablo Hugo Portugal Rodríguez		2010	June 18, 2014	Alan García	Ambassador, concurrent with Estonia, Latvia and Lithuania. Retired in 2018.
José Eduardo Chávarri García		August 10, 2015	May 31, 2017	Ollanta Humala	Ambassador, concurrent with Estonia, Latvia and Lithuania.
Thierry Roca-Rey Deladrier		August 1, 2017	December 6, 2021	Pedro Pablo Kuczynski	Ambassador, concurrent with Estonia, Latvia and Lithuania.
Eric Edgardo Guillermo Anderson Machado		November 18, 2021	February 28, 2024	Pedro Castillo	Ambassador, concurrent with Estonia, Latvia and Lithuania.
Moisés Ernesto Pinto Bazurco Rittler		March 1, 2024	January 31, 2026	Dina Boluarte	Ambassador, concurrent with Estonia, Latvia and Lithuania.
Jorge Renato Reyes Tagle		February 1, 2026		José Balcázar	Ambassador, concurrent with Estonia, Latvia and Lithuania.

== See also ==
- List of ambassadors of Finland to Peru
- List of ambassadors of Peru to Denmark
- List of ambassadors of Peru to Norway
- List of ambassadors of Peru to Sweden
