= Torsten Tikanvaara =

Finnish diplomat and lawyer

Karl Torsten Tikanvaara until 1936 Wikman (21 June 1909 Jakobstad – 1993) was a Finnish diplomat and a lawyer. He was Finnish Permanent Representative in the UN in Geneva from 1955 to 1959, Head of the Administrative Department of the Ministry for Foreign Affairs, 1959–1961, Commercial Representative in Cologne 1961–1964, and Ambassador to Canada in Ottawa, 1964–1967. and Caracas and Lima 1967–1976.
