= Johanna Teague =

Swedish diplomat

Johanna Christina Teague (born 8 March 1973) is a Swedish diplomat who currently serves as Swedish ambassador to Peru.

== Career ==
Teague served as Group Manager at the Swedish Ministry for Foreign Affairs' International Development Cooperation Agency. Previously, she had served as an Advisor to the Minister for Development at Sida in Stockholm and Bolivia, as well as for the United Nations Population Fund (UNFPA) in La Paz. She was the second Swedish ambassador in Rwanda after opening of the embassy and replaced Jenny Ohlsson in August 2020.

Teague served as ambassador in La Paz, Bolivia from 2024 to 2026 and in Lima, Peru from 2026.

Diplomatic posts
Preceded by Jenny Ohlsson	Ambassador of Sweden to Rwanda; 2020–2024	Succeeded by Dag Sjöögren
Preceded by Nicolas Weeks	Ambassador of Sweden to Bolivia; 2024–2026	Succeeded by ?
Preceded by Peter Svensson Kemeny	Ambassador of Sweden to Peru; 2026–present	Succeeded by Incumbent
