= List of ambassadors of Peru to Denmark =

Ambassador of Peru to Denmark
- Great Seal of Peru
- Ministry of Foreign Affairs
- Appointer: The president of Peru
- Inaugural holder: 2025

The ambassador extraordinary and plenipotentiary of Peru to the Kingdom of Denmark was the official representative of the Republic of Peru to the Kingdom of Denmark, resident in Copenhagen.

Peru maintained an embassy in Copenhagen from 1957 until its closure in 1988. It was reopened in 1999, but closed permanently in 2003. The Peruvian ambassador in Stockholm has been accredited to Denmark during the 1990s and since 2003, with a brief exception from 2011 to 2012, where the Peruvian ambassador in Berlin was accredited instead.

== List of representatives ==
Name	Term begin	Term end	President	Notes
Oscar Grau Astete	1963	?	Fernando Belaúnde	As ambassador.
José Pareja Paz Soldán	before 1973	after 1973	Juan Velasco Alvarado	As ambassador.
Antonio Belaúnde Moreyra	after 1973	?	?	As ambassador.
Liliana Cino de Silva	1999	2003	Alberto Fujimori	Final resident ambassador to Denmark before the second closure.
Augusto Ernesto Salamanca Castro	2025	2026	José Jerí	Resident ambassador to Denmark after embassy reopened in 2025.

== See also ==
- List of ambassadors of Denmark to Peru
- List of ambassadors of Peru to Finland
- List of ambassadors of Peru to Norway
- List of ambassadors of Peru to Sweden
