= Klaus Snellman =

Finnish diplomat (1924–2003)

Klaus Kristian Snellman (20 March 1924 in Helsinki – 25 June 2003 in Helsinki) was a Finnish diplomat, a Bachelor of Political Science. He was an Ambassador in 1976–1980 in Lima and Manila between 1980 and 1984 and then a negotiating officer of the Ministry for Foreign Affairs until 1986 when he was appointed Ambassador to Sofia, where he remained until his retirement in 1990.
