= Iran Expo 2025 =

2025 Tehran
- Logo

Overview
- BIE-class: Universal exposition
- Category: International Registered Exhibition
- Name: Iran EXPO 2025
- Motto: A gateway to global trade
- Building(s): Permanent venue for Tehran International Exhibitions
- Visitors: 2800 (companies)
- Organized by: Majid Takbiri

Location
- Country: Iran
- City: Tehran

Timeline
- Bidding: 22 April 2017
- Awarded: 23 November 2018
- Opening: 28 April 2025
- Closure: 3 May 2025

Universal expositions
- Previous: IranExpo 2024 in Tehran

Internet
- Website: www.iranexpo.co/fa

Iran Expo 2025 is an exhibition that showcases the export goods of the Islamic Republic of Iran. It was held for the seventh time on April 28 at the International Exhibition Center in Tehran.

Mohammad Ali Dehghan Dehnavi, Head of the Trade Development Organization, considers Expo 2025 events and the Iran-Africa Cooperation Summit to be the biggest economic and political event of this year in Iran.

== History ==
According to the Deputy Director of Commissions, Assemblies, and Councils of the Iranian Chamber of Commerce, the Iran Expo (IRANEXPO) exhibition is being held in Iran for the first time since 2013. This exhibition has previously taken place during six periods: 2013, 2017, 2018, 2019, 2023, and 2024.

The presence of domestic and foreign companies in previous years' Era Expos is as follows:

History of IranExpo
Year	Participating countries	Foreign traders	Domestic companies
2013	35 companies	411 people	400 companies
2017	48 companies	573 people	250 companies
2018	54 companies	557 people	300 companies
2019	41 companies	374 people	200 companies
2023	70 companies	1300 people	600 companies
2024	94 companies	2443people	800 companies

== product categories ==
The head of the Iran Expo organizing committee is Majid Takbiri. This exhibition focuses on exports across seven product categories, including: the food industry; agriculture and fisheries; industry; handmade carpets; handicrafts and tourism; medicine, medical equipment, and chemical products; construction and technical engineering services; and the petrochemical sector.

== Participates ==
About 2,000 companies and representatives from different countries of the world and 800 Iranian companies are present in this exhibition. The exhibition hosts 2,500 businessmen from 106 countries and officials from 39 countries of the world. Among the invited guests to this trade event are the Secretary General of D8, the Secretary General of ECO, the Secretary General of IORA and Shanghai.

About 4,000 foreign applicants from 110 countries have registered to participate in this exhibition, including 41 Asian countries, 21 European countries, 39 African countries, eight countries from the American continent and one country from Oceania.
