= Embassy of Peru, Stockholm =

Embassy of Peru in Sweden
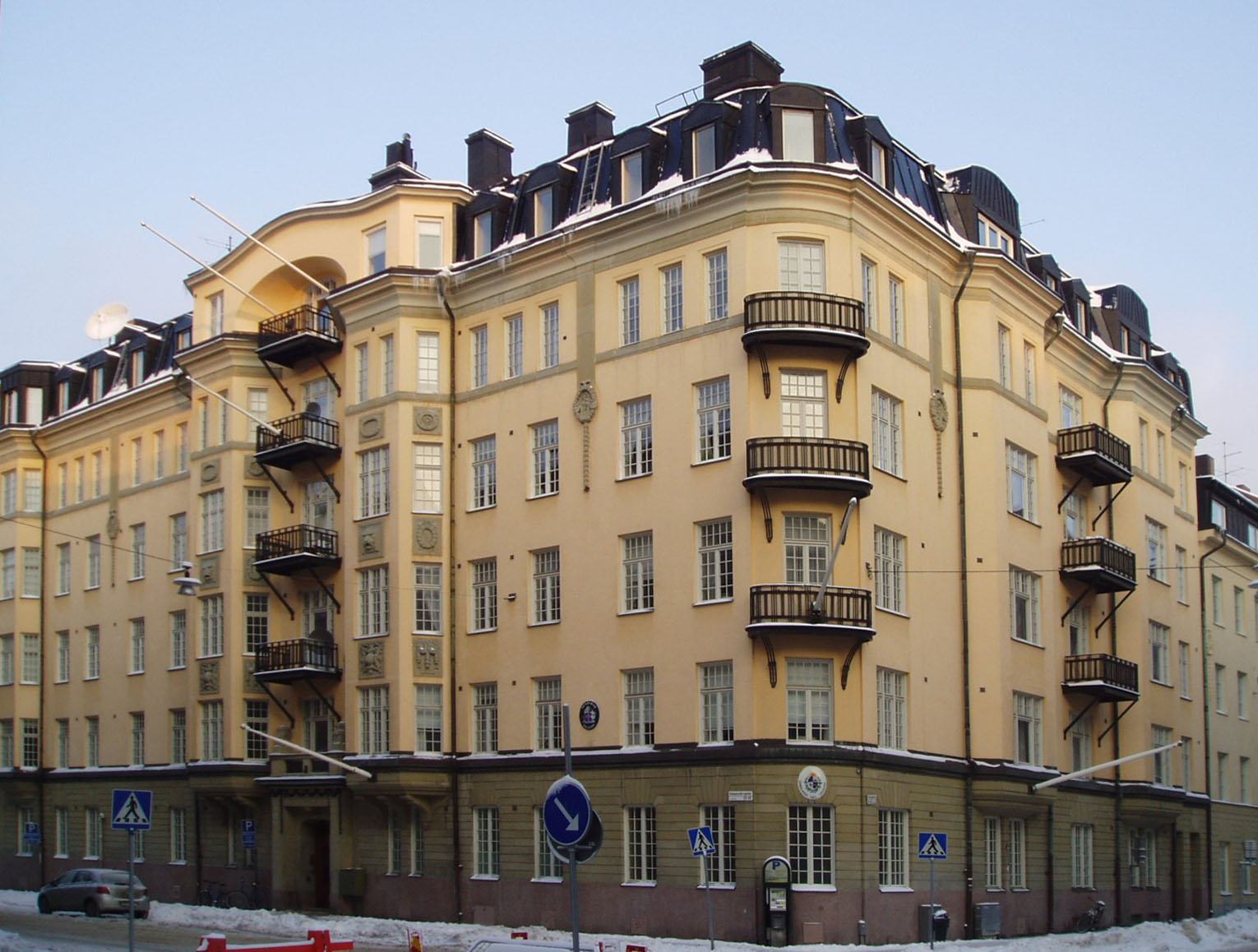
- Ambassador: Miguel Ángel Samanez Bendezú
- Website: Official website

The Embassy of Peru in Sweden (Spanish: Embajada del Perú en Suecia) is the diplomatic mission of Peru in Sweden.

The current Peruvian ambassador to Sweden is Miguel Ángel Samanez Bendezú.

== History ==
Diplomatic relations between Peru and Sweden were established in the 1930s. The embassy was closed in 2010 but reopened in 2012. The ambassador in Stockholm is also accredited to neighbouring Denmark (Note: Peru maintained an embassy from 1957 until its closure in 1988. The embassy reopened in 1999 but closed again in 2003. The ambassador in Berlin was also accredited to the Nordic state from 2011 to 2012, when the ambassador in Sweden became accredited instead.) and has also been accredited to Iceland (Note: Until 2018.) and Norway, as well as Finland.

The embassy was the target of an unsuccessful terrorist attack in 1992.

== See also ==
- Embassy of Sweden, Lima
