= Peru–Sweden relations =

- Peru: Sweden

Diplomatic mission
- Embassy of Peru, Stockholm: Embassy of Sweden, Lima

Peru–Sweden relations refers to the bilateral relations between the Republic of Peru and the Kingdom of Sweden. In November 2016, the Swedish embassy in Lima restarted its activities. However, the embassy closed again in October 2022. Sweden re-opened its embassy in Lima in 2026.

== History ==
The original Swedish embassy in Lima was established in 1940. The building was redesigned in 1956, by the architect J. Fussing.

One major issue in Peruvian-Swedish relations has been the matter of the Paracas textiles. A large collection of textile artifacts originating from the ancient Paracas culture, located in modern Peru, were illegally smuggled out by the Swedish diplomat Sven Karell in the 1930s, contravening Peruvian laws on the export of antiquities. After years of attempting to retrieve the textiles, kept in Gothenburg, in 2013 Peruvian authorities were successful in negotiating a deal for their gradual return. This exchange began in 2014, with some of the textiles put on display in Peru. The plan is to have the entire collection, consisting of 89 separate pieces, returned by 2021.

In 2025, the Swedish government announced the reopening of their embassy in the country, coinciding with the 170th anniversary of bilateral relations between both countries.

== Resident diplomatic missions ==
- Peru has an embassy in Stockholm.
- Sweden has an embassy in Lima.
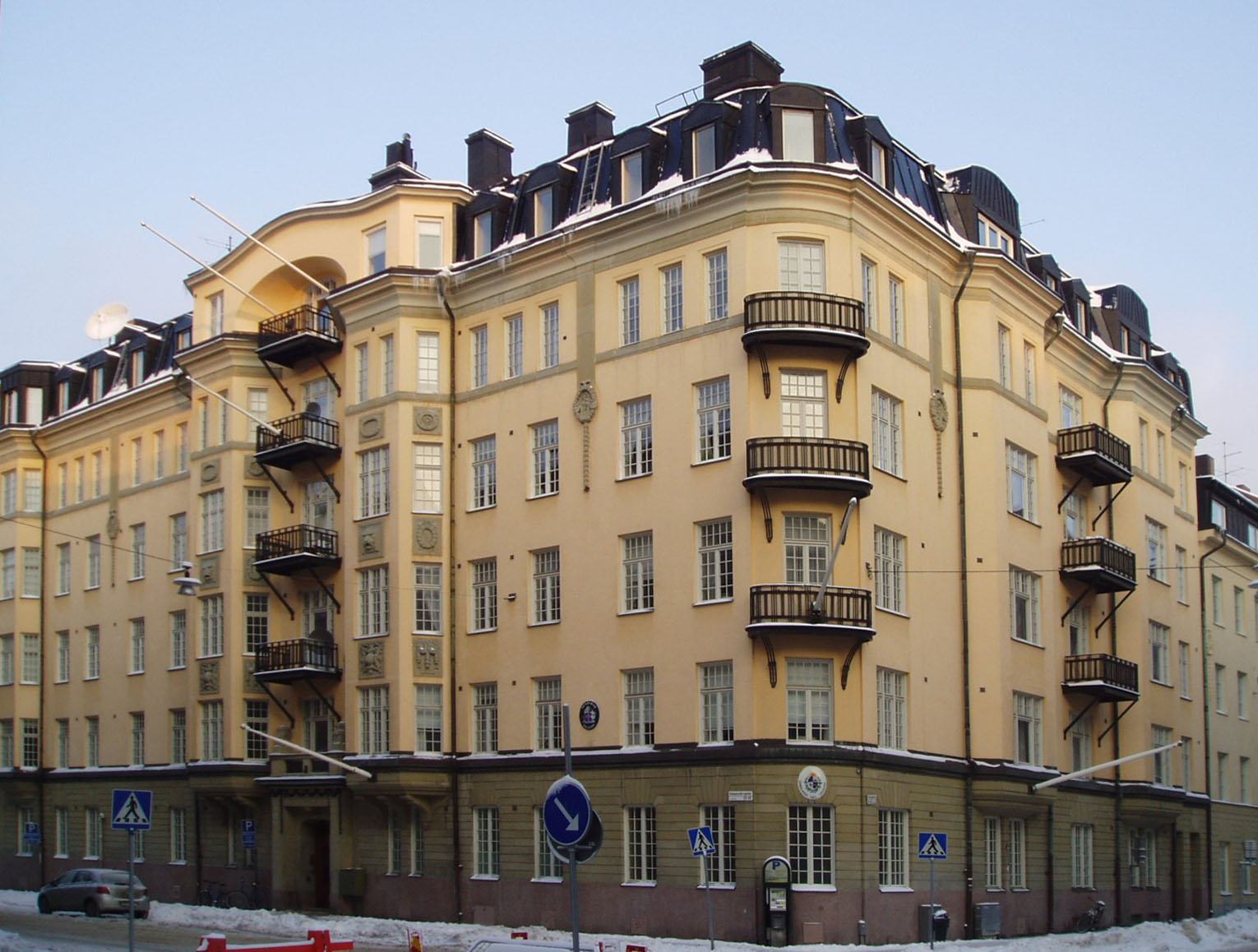
Building hosting the embassy of Peru in Stockholm.

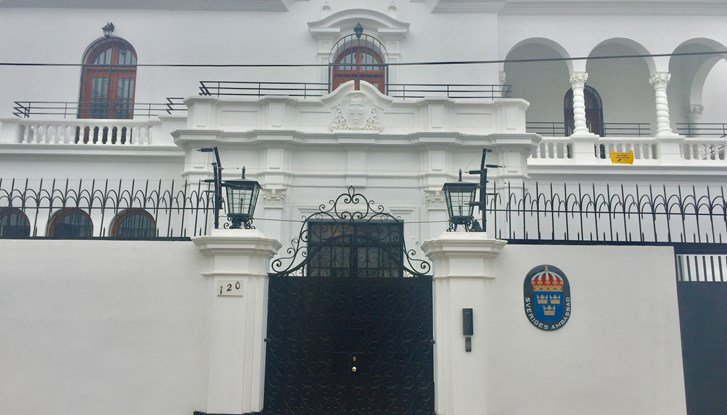
Former Swedish embassy in Lima

== See also ==
- Foreign relations of Peru
- Foreign relations of Sweden
- List of ambassadors of Peru to Sweden
- List of ambassadors of Sweden to Peru
