= Proliferation =

Proliferation may refer to:

== Weapons ==
- Nuclear proliferation, the spread of nuclear weapons, material, and technology
- Chemical weapon proliferation, the spread of chemical weapons, material, and technology
- Missile proliferation, the spread of long range heavy payload missiles
- Small arms proliferation, the spread of small weapons

== Computer science ==
- License proliferation, a problem caused by incompatible FOSS software licenses
- Data proliferation, the ever-accelerating production of data

== Medicine and biology ==
- Cell proliferation, cell growth and division
- Proliferation, a phase of wound healing
- Atypical small acinar proliferation, a concept in urologic pathology
- Intravenous atypical vascular proliferation, a skin condition
- Massive periretinal proliferation, a disease of the eye

== Music ==
- Proliferation (album), a 2008 album by Mike Reed's People, Places & Things

== Efforts against proliferation ==
- Antiproliferation or anti-proliferation: inhibiting cell multiplication; also efforts to slow, stop, or prevent the spread of weapons (nuclear, chemical, biological weapons, missiles) and technology, small arms, illicit drugs
- Counterproliferation or counter-proliferation: efforts to slow, stop, or prevent the spread of weapons (nuclear, chemical, biological weapons, missiles) and technology, small arms, illicit drugs

== Other uses ==
- Conceptual proliferation, a concept in Buddhism
- Product proliferation, an organization's marketing of many variations of the same product
