= List of ambassadors of Peru to Sweden =

Ambassador of Peru to the Kingdom of Sweden
- Great Seal of Peru
- Incumbent; Miguel Ángel Samanez Bendezú since May 1, 2023
- Ministry of Foreign Affairs; Embassy of Peru, Stockholm
- Residence: 57 Karlavägen
- Appointer: The president of Peru
- Term length: José Ortiz de Zevallos
- Inaugural holder: 1938
- Website: Embassy of Peru in Sweden

The extraordinary and plenipotentiary ambassador of Peru to the Kingdom of Sweden is the official representative of the Republic of Peru to the Kingdom of Sweden.

The ambassador in Stockholm is also accredited to neighbouring Denmark (Note: Peru maintained an embassy from 1957 until its closure in 1988. The embassy reopened in 1999 but closed again in 2003. The ambassador in Berlin was also accredited to the Nordic state from 2011 to 2012, when the ambassador in Sweden became accredited instead.) and has also been accredited to Iceland (Note: Until 2018.) and Norway, as well as Finland.

Both countries established diplomatic relations on February 11, 1938 and maintain embassies in both Stockholm and Lima. The former was closed in 2010 but reopened in 2012, and the latter was also closed in 2001 but reopened in 2015.

== List of representatives ==
Name	Portrait	Term begin	Term end	President	Notes
José Bernardo Ortiz de Zevallos y Vidaurre, 7th Marquess of Torre Tagle		1936	1945	Óscar R. Benavides	Representative at the time of the establishment of diplomatic relations.
Alejandro Freundt Rosell		December 1949	1952	Manuel A. Odría	As Envoy Extraordinary and Minister Plenipotentiary.
Carlos A. Mackehenie		1952	?	Manuel A. Odría	
Santiago Bedoya Montjoy		1957	?	Manuel A. Odría	
José Francisco Mariátegui Parodi		January 1963	?	Ricardo Pérez Godoy	
Jorge Guillermo Llosa Pautrat		1985	1987	Alan García	Also accredited to Norway.
Gustavo Silva Aranda		1990	1993	Alberto Fujimori	As ambassador; also accredited to Iceland. He was targeted in an unsuccessful assassination attempt in 1992.
Jaime Stiglich Bérninzon		March 1993	October 1995	Alberto Fujimori	As ambassador; also accredited to Denmark, Norway, Iceland and Finland.
José Emilio Romero Cevallos		1995	?	Alberto Fujimori	As ambassador. Romero presented his credentials to King Carl XVI Gustaf on December 30, 1995.
Gilbert Chauny de Porturas-Hoyle		April 1, 2008	2010	Alan García	As ambassador.
Lourdes Hilbck de Arróspide		May 28, 2012	2013	Ollanta Humala	As chargé d'affaires (a.i.)
José Rafael Eduardo Beraún Araníbar		May 1, 2013	2018	Ollanta Humala	As ambassador; also accredited to Norway, Denmark and Iceland.
José Antonio Raymundo Bellina Acevedo		May 18, 2018; May 25, 2020	May 24, 2020; 2022	Martín Vizcarra	As ambassador, concurrent with Denmark. His term was extended due to travel restrictions in 2020.
Cristina María del Rosario Ronquillo de Blödorn		May 1, 2022	?	Pedro Castillo	As ambassador; accredited to Denmark.
Miguel Ángel Samanez Bendezú		May 1, 2023	Incumbent	Dina Boluarte	As ambassador; accredited to Denmark.

== See also ==
- List of ambassadors of Peru to Denmark
- List of ambassadors of Peru to Finland
- List of ambassadors of Peru to Norway
