= List of attacks on diplomatic missions =

The following is a list of attacks on diplomatic buildings (embassies, consulates) anywhere in the world. The list does not include attacks on individuals outside or inside an embassy, such as assassinations of ambassadors, or incidents such as letter bombs to individuals.

== List ==
Year	Date	Diplomatic mission	Location country	Location city	Deaths	Injuries	Details
1829	February 11	Russia	Persia	Tehran	4+		Death of Aleksander Griboyedov
1900	June 20 – August 14	Legation Quarter (multinational): UK; France; Germany; Japan; Russia; Italy; Spain; Austria-Hungary; Belgium; Netherlands; United States	China	Beijing	68		Siege of the International Legations during the Boxer Rebellion
1918	August 31	UK	Russia	Moscow	4+		Bolshevik raid on British embassy for sake of "Lockhart Plot" prevention leaves Francis Cromie and more dead.
1924	July 18	United States	Persia	Tehran	1	0	Muslim clerics and soldiers of the Iranian military beat Robert Whitney Imbrie, United States consul in Tehran after it was incorrectly believed that he poisoned a well.
1926	May 16	United States	Argentina	Buenos Aires	0	0	Bombing following the trial and executions of Sacco and Vanzetti.
1926	June 4	United States	Uruguay	Montevideo	0	0	Bombing following the trial and executions of Sacco and Vanzetti.
1927	March 24	UK	China	Nanking			Nanking Incident
1927	March 24	Japan	China	Nanking			Nanking Incident
1927	March 24	United States	China	Nanking			Nanking Incident
1927	April 6	Soviet Union	China	Peking			On April 6, with support from other foreign diplomatic missions, Zhang Zuolin ordered policemen and gendarmeries stormed and invaded the Soviet embassy in Peking to arrest Li Dazhao and his family, as Li was accused of overthrowing government backed by Soviet Union. Li Dazhao was sentenced to death later, and his family members were released shortly after Li was executed.
1936	May 3-5	United States	Ethiopia	Addis Ababa	0	2	Attack on the United States embassy in Addis Ababa
1937		UK	Spain	Valencia			Aerial bombings by Nationalist forces during the Spanish Civil War damaged the British Embassy and destroyed the Paraguayan consulate.
1937		Paraguay	Spain	Valencia			Aerial bombings by Nationalist forces during the Spanish Civil War damaged the British Embassy and destroyed the Paraguayan consulate.
1941		United Kingdom	Spain	Madrid			On June 24, in the days following Nazi Germany's declaration of war on the Soviet Union, members of the Falange stormed the British Embassy with a truck-load of stones at their disposal. Embassy staff as well as 16 escaped POWs prevented an attempted break in by the Falangists. The Spanish dictator Francisco Franco dismissed the incident as a "trivial matter concerning young hotheads" in response to a protest by the British ambassador Sir Samuel Hoare.
1946		United Kingdom	Italy	Rome	0	2	Irgun campaign; British Embassy bombing
1947	September 27	Sweden	Mandate for Palestine	Jerusalem	0	0	A bomb exploded at the gate of the Swedish consulate in Jerusalem. The explosion caused some minor damage to the building. No people were injured. The police suspected that the bomb was placed by a Jewish or Arab individual who was angered by the proposal for the partition of Palestine developed under the chairmanship of the Swede Emil Sandström by the United Nations Special Committee on Palestine.
1951	February 19	Soviet Union	Albania	Tirana	0		Bombing led to the Massacre of 1951 in Albania
1952	January 26	Sweden	Egypt	Cairo	0	0	In what became known as the Cairo fire on January 26, 1952, the two-story Swedish consulate general in Cairo was completely destroyed after being stormed, looted, and set on fire by rebellious crowds. Consul General Erik Ekberg and an Egyptian office assistant were in the building, but no one was harmed.
1952	November 8 and December 5	Czechoslovakia	Israel	Tel Aviv	0		Perpetrated by the Tzrifin Underground in response to the persecution of Jews in Czechoslovakia.
1953	February 9	Soviet Union	Israel	Tel Aviv	0	3	Perpetrated by the Tzrifin Underground in response to the Doctors' plot and other incidents of persecution in the Eastern Bloc.
1955	February 14–16	Romania	Switzerland	Bern	0		1955 seizure of the Romanian embassy in Bern
1957	May 24	United States	Republic of China	Taipei	3	38	May 24 incident
1958	July 27	Republic of China	Turkey	Ankara	0	0	Bombs exploded at the Chinese Embassy compound and a Chinese school. The bombings caused minor damage to both places.
1961	October 1	Peru	Venezuela	Caracas			Eight Venezuelans, five of whom escaped from a military hospital at gunpoint accompanied by three armed accomplices who joined them outside, sought asylum in the embassy, being forced out of the colonial building by the local police and army, ending in a shootout that continued inside the embassy. Amid the confusion, press attaché Guillermo O'Haggen was dragged out to the embassy's garden by various officers through a broken window, while Panamanian citizen Raúl Rodríguez was detained when leaving the embassy. Peruvian ambassador Pedro Ugarteche y Tizón protested the events the following day.
1962	January 22	United States	Venezuela	Caracas	0	0	Several bombs were detonated in Caracas, including one in the United States embassy.
1962	November 28	Yugoslavia	West Germany	Bonn	1	1	Attack by Croatian Crusader Brotherhood.
1963	September 16	United Kingdom	Indonesia	Jakarta	0	0	Mob attack burnt the embassy and smashed all its windows.
1964	March 5 and 8	United States	Gabon	Libreville	0	0	1964 United States Embassy in Libreville bombings
1964	March 18	Morocco	Soviet Union	Moscow	0	0	1964 Moscow protest
1964	June 30	Philippines	South Vietnam	Saigon			Bombing
1965	March 30	United States	South Vietnam	Saigon	22	188	30 March 1965 Saigon Embassy bombing
1966	August 30	Yugoslavia	West Germany	Stuttgart	1	0	Attack by Croatian Revolutionary Brotherhood.
1966	September 22	Cuba	Canada	Ottawa	0	0	(See: Embassy of Cuba, Ottawa)
1966	September 24	Portugal	Democratic Republic of the Congo	Kinshasa	0	3	Rioters sack the embassy and assault three staff members in a 20-minute rampage.
1966	December 20	United States	Yugoslavia	Zagreb			
1967	January 1	Yugoslavia	Australia	Sydney	0	0	
1967	January 28–30	Yugoslavia	United States	San Francisco	0	0	Synchronized bombing. Explosion went off at 12:55 AM in walkway between the consulate and home of Richard Stockton Rush Jr. (father of Richard Stockton Rush III), blowing holes in the walls of both the consulate where caretaker Mihailo Simić and his wife were sleeping and the very room in which 6-year-old Catherine Rush was sleeping.
1967	January 28–30	Yugoslavia	United States	New York	0	0	Synchronized bombing. The bomb was pushed under a locked iron grillwork fence to explode in a stairway.
1967	January 28–30	Yugoslavia	United States	Chicago	0	0	Synchronized bombing. Perpetrated by Miomir Radovanović and Dragiša Kašiković. Left a crater in the backyard. In response, the FBI had Serbian flyers condemning the bombings distributed in Chicago.
1967	January 28–30	Yugoslavia	United States	Washington, D.C.	0	0	Synchronized bombing. Shattered 30 windows, blew a hole in the wall, left a three-foot crater in the ground.
1967	January 28–30	Yugoslavia	Canada	Toronto	0	0	Synchronized bombing. The front door of the consulate was nearly blown off.
1967	January 28–30	Yugoslavia	Canada	Ottawa	0	0	Synchronized bombing.
1967		Soviet Union	China	Beijing			See: Chinese Cultural Revolution
1967	August	United Kingdom	China	Beijing			See: Chinese Cultural Revolution
1967	June	United Kingdom	Libya	Benghazi			American and British embassies were attacked and burned by rioters after false rumors spread in the city that the United States had bombed Cairo. This incident occurred at the start of the Six-Day War.
1967	June	United States	Libya	Benghazi			American and British embassies were attacked and burned by rioters after false rumors spread in the city that the United States had bombed Cairo. This incident occurred at the start of the Six-Day War.
1967	September 19	Republic of China	South Vietnam	Saigon	0	12	Bombing
1967	October	China	Indonesia	Jakarta	0	0	Aftermath of the Indonesian mass killings of 1965–1966. Diplomatic relations with People's Republic of China severed.
1967	November 29	Yugoslavia	Australia	Melbourne	0	1	Bombing.
1968	January 31	United States	South Vietnam	Saigon	5		Tet offensive attack on US Embassy
1968	February 21	Soviet Union	United States	Washington D.C.	0	0	
1968	October	Singapore	Indonesia	Jakarta			Ransacked in reaction to Singapore's execution of two Indonesia marines responsible for the MacDonald House bombing.
1968		Philippines	Malaysia	Kuala Lumpur			Due to the North Borneo dispute
1969		Soviet Union	China	Beijing			Due to the Sino-Soviet border conflict
1969	June	Yugoslavia	Australia	Sydney			Bombing.
1969	November	Yugoslavia	Australia	Canberra			Gelignite bombing.
1970	October 21	Yugoslavia	Australia	Melbourne	0	0	Bombing.
1971		United States	Khmer Republic	Phnom Penh			
1971	January 17	Soviet Union	Australia	Canberra	0	0	A group of suspected Bulgarian émigrés detonated three crude homemade gelignite bombs at the Soviet Embassy in Canberra.
1971	February 10	Yugoslavia	Sweden	Gothenburg	0	0	Two Croatian emigres seized the Yugoslav consulate in demanding the release of prisoners held in Yugoslav jails, only to surrender to authorities after their demands were refused.
1971	April 7	Yugoslavia	Sweden	Stockholm	1	0	The 1971 Yugoslav Embassy shooting. Ambassador Vladimir Rolović was killed in the attack by Croatian National Resistance.
1972	February 2	UK	Ireland	Dublin	0	20	(See: Bloody Sunday (1972) and Burning of British Embassy, Dublin)
1972	February 17	Yugoslavia	Australia	Perth			Armed assault.
1972	April 4	Cuba	Canada	Montreal	1	7	Bombing of Cuban trade offices in Montreal.
1972	December 28	Israel	Thailand	Bangkok	0		Bangkok Israeli embassy hostage crisis
1972		China	Philippines	Manila	0	1	Attacked by suspected British soldiers.
1973	March 1	Saudi Arabia	Sudan	Khartoum	3		Attack on the Saudi Embassy in Khartoum
1973	December 14	Algeria	France	Marseille	4	23	Algerian consulate bombing in Marseille
1974	February 7	Japan	Kuwait	Kuwait City	0	0	1974 attack on the Japanese Embassy in Kuwait
1974	July 26	Peru	United States	San Juan	0	0	A bomb planted by a Cuban exile group destroyed two cars and damaged the consulate.
1974	August 19	United States	Cyprus	Nicosia	2	0	1974 anti-American riots in Cyprus
1974	September 13	France	Netherlands	The Hague	0	0	1974 French Embassy attack in The Hague
1975	April 24	West Germany	Sweden	Stockholm	4	14	West German Embassy siege
1975	April 29	Israel	South Africa	Johannesburg	4	82	1975 Fox Street siege: David Protter, a South African Jew, seized about 20–30 hostages at the Israeli Consulate General where he worked as a security officer. The consulate was on the 5th-floor of an office building in downtown Johannesburg. After killing two consulate employees Protter – armed with two Uzi submachine guns, eleven pistols, a .22 pellet gun and about 2 000 rounds of ammunition – opened fire on pedestrians and motorists in Fox and Von Brandis Streets, killing 2 and wounding 82. He surrendered to police early the next morning (30 April), 19 hours after taking over the consulate.
1975		Egypt	Spain	Madrid			Ambassador Mahmoud Abdul Ghaffer, as well as the consul and the press attaché of the embassy of Egypt in Madrid were held at gunpoint by unaffiliated Palestinian militants at the embassy. The group left via a plane headed to Algiers, alongside the ambassadors of Algeria (Jaled Jelladi) and Iraq (Hassan Al-Naklb), who requested to accompany Ghaffer. All hostages and perpetrators were released at Algiers–Dar El Beïda International Airport.
1975	August 4	United States	Malaysia	Kuala Lumpur	0	4	1975 AIA building hostage crisis
1975	September 27	Spain	Portugal	Lisbon			Attacked by far left activists in response to the execution of far left activists by the Spanish state.
1975	December 4–19	Indonesia	Netherlands	Amsterdam	1		1975 Indonesian consulate hostage crisis
1976	17 February	China	Venezuela	Caracas	0	0	
1976	April 22	Cuba	Portugal	Lisbon	2		Attack by far right terrorists.
1977	April 16	West Germany	Israel	Tel Aviv	0	0	Two Israelis occupied part of the West German Embassy in Tel Aviv to protest the slowness of a trial of former Nazis in Dusseldorf.
1977	August 18	Sweden	Tunisia	Tunis	0	0	The Swedish embassy in Tunis was set on fire by a Tunisian man who had previously lived in Sweden and wanted to return there. When he was not allowed to do so, he decided to retaliate by setting the embassy on fire. A few days earlier, the man had vandalized a business and was then admitted to a mental hospital. He escaped from there. The man had a knife during the attack on the embassy. When the police apprehended him, he attempted to take his own life.
1977	November 18	Egypt	Greece	Athens	1		A group of Arab students stormed the Egyptian embassy in Athens to protest Egyptian president Anwar Sadat's historic trip to Jerusalem. Embassy guards opened fire on the protesters.
1977	November 18	Egypt	Lebanon	Beirut	1	8	A rocket fired at the Egyptian Embassy killed one security guard and wounded two other guards and six soldiers from Saudi Arabia. This incident was in response to Egyptian president Anwar Sadat's historic trip to Jerusalem.
1978	July 31	Iraq	France	Paris	2	4	Two gunmen attacked the Iraqi Embassy in Paris, but one of them fled during the attack. The lone gunman was persuaded to release his eight hostages and surrender after eight hours. As he was being led away, Iraqi guards opened fire, wounding the gunman and killing one policeman. Police returned fire, killing one of the Iraqis and wounding three others.
1978	December 11	West Germany	Israel	Tel Aviv	0	0	Three Israeli gunmen seized the West German Embassy and Culture Centre in Tel Aviv. They demanded the abolition of the West German statute of limitations whereby those accused of war crimes could not be tried after 1978.
1979	February 14	United States	Iran	Tehran	0	1	Kenneth Kraus was the first of the Iran hostages
1979	May 4	Costa Rica	El Salvador	San Salvador	0	0	Four armed members of the Popular Revolutionary Bloc (BPR) seized the Costa Rican embassy, taking five persons hostage. The hostages escaped on May 9, but the group continued to hold the embassy until they were granted safe passage to Costa Rica.
1979	May 4	France	El Salvador	San Salvador	0	1	Sixteen armed members of the Popular Revolutionary Bloc (BPR) seized the French embassy, taking six persons hostage. Granted political asylum in Mexico, the militants released the hostages on June 1.
1979	May 11	Venezuela	El Salvador	San Salvador	0	0	Nine armed members of the Popular Revolutionary Bloc (BPR) seized the Venezuelan embassy, taking eight persons hostage. On May 20, the ambassador and four staff members escaped. The group continued to hold the embassy until June 1, when they were granted safe passage to Mexico.
1979	May 15	South Africa	El Salvador	San Salvador	2	0	Eight members of the Farabundo Marti Popular Liberation Forces attempted to seize the South African embassy. The attackers were repulsed after a gun battle with police which left two policemen dead. All of the attackers escaped.
1979	May 18	Cuba	United States	Washington D.C.			Bomb detonated by Omega 7
1979	June 26	Mexico	Guatemala	Guatemala City	0	0	Guatemalan workers seized the Mexican embassy, taking the ambassador and 15-20 others hostage.
1979	July 14	Egypt	Turkey	Ankara	3		Four terrorists from the group Eagles of the Palestinian Revolution seized the Egyptian embassy in Ankara and held a number of diplomats, including the ambassador, hostage for two days.
1979	October 30	United States	El Salvador	San Salvador	0	2	Approximately 300 armed leftists attempted to storm the American embassy. U.S Marine guards and local police forces drove back the attackers.
1979	October 31	Guatemala	El Salvador	San Salvador	0	Unknown	A group of unknown attackers attempted to seize the Guatemalan embassy, but were driven back by security forces after a ten-minute battle.
1979	November 4	United States	Iran	Tehran	9		Iran Hostage Crisis
1979	November 21	United States	Pakistan	Islamabad	6	70+	1979 U.S. embassy burning in Islamabad
1979	December 2	United States	Libya	Tripoli	0	0	1979 United States embassy burning in Libya
1980	January 11	Panama	El Salvador	San Salvador	0	0	Approximately 50 leftist militants of the 28 February Popular League seized the Panamanian embassy, taking seven hostages, including the Panamanian and Costa Rican ambassadors.
1980	January 31	Spain	Guatemala	Guatemala City	36	2	Burning of the Spanish Embassy in Guatemala
1980	February 4	Spain	El Salvador	San Salvador	0	0	About 30 members of the 28 February Popular League seized the Spanish embassy, taking eleven hostages, including the Spanish ambassador.
1980	February 13	Panama	El Salvador	San Salvador	0	0	A group of leftist militants seized the Panamanian embassy for the second time in a month, taking three hostages, including the Panamanian ambassador.
1980	February 27 – April 27	Dominican Republic	Colombia	Bogotá	1	5	1980 Dominican Republic Embassy siege in Bogotá
1980	February 28	El Salvador	Panama	Panama City	0	0	A group of 17 Panamanian student militants briefly took over the Salvadoran embassy to demand the release of imprisoned comrades.
1980	April 1	Peru	Cuba	Havana	1	2	Peruvian Havana Embassy Crisis of 1980
1980	April 30 – May 5	Iran	United Kingdom	London	7		Iranian Embassy siege
1980	May 20	Nicaragua	Peru	Lima	0	1	A security guard was attacked and his submachine gun stolen, the first attack of its type in the country.
1980	October 30	United States	Honduras	Tegucigalpa	0	0	The Revolutionary Popular Forces Lorenzo Zelaya open fire on the U.S. Embassy annex with small arms in a drive-by shooting.
1980	October 31	Chile	Honduras	Tegucigalpa	0	4	A bomb critically wounds 4 Honduran policemen stationed outside the Chilean embassy. The Revolutionary Popular Forces Lorenzo Zelaya claim responsibility, ostensibly to protest the presence of Chilean military advisors in Honduras.
1981	March 26	United States	El Salvador	San Salvador	0	0	Gunmen attacked the United States embassy with rocket-propelled grenades and submachine guns, extensively damaging the building.
1981	July 10	China	Peru	Lima	0	0	A bomb exploded at the Chinese embassy's garden as part of a series of attacks that also targeted a local headquarters of the Acción Popular political party and the Caja Municipal de Crédito bank at the corner of Piérola and Grau avenues.
1981	August 31	United States	Peru	Lima	2		A bomb exploded in front of the U.S. embassy at Wilson Avenue and at the residence's main yard in Arequipa Avenue, located a few blocks away, as part of a series of attacks that also targeted factories of American companies, as well as a branch of the Bank of America. The Argentine embassy was also attacked.
1981	August 31	Argentina	Peru	Lima			A bomb exploded in front of the U.S. embassy at Wilson Avenue and at the residence's main yard in Arequipa Avenue, located a few blocks away, as part of a series of attacks that also targeted factories of American companies, as well as a branch of the Bank of America. The Argentine embassy was also attacked.
1981	September 4	Yugoslavia	Peru	Lima	0	0	An attempt was made to bomb the embassy.
1981	September 24–25	Turkey	France	Paris	1	2	Turkish consulate attack in Paris
1981	December 15	Iraq	Lebanon	Beirut	61	100+	Iraqi embassy bombing in Beirut
1982	May 24	France	Lebanon	Beirut	14	22	Car bombing of the French embassy in Beirut. The Front for the Liberation of Lebanon from Foreigners claimed responsibility.
1982	July 24	United States	Peru	Lima			The embassy was attacked with dynamite as part of a series of attacks that included company headquarters.
1982	July 26	United Kingdom	Peru	Lima			The residence of the British ambassador was attacked with dynamite alongside the offices of newspaper La Prensa and Bayer, a mall, Hans Christian Andersen school and the Coliseo Amauta, which was then hosting Miss Universe 1982.
1982	September 6	Poland	Switzerland	Bern	0	0	1982 seizure of the Polish embassy in Bern
1982	October 28	India	Peru	Lima	1	0	Four armed men shot and killed a guard at the embassy.
1982	October 29	United States	Peru	Lima	0	0	Reports of the midday attack vary between a gunfight between six gunmen (four men in a small car and two on motorcycles) and six members of the Civil Guard, and one attacker without the exchange of gunfire. Ambassador Frank Ortiz was not at the residence at the time.
1982	December 8	South Africa	Lesotho	Maseru	3	Unknown	ANC guerillas attack the South African embassy.
1982	December 23	Israel	Australia	Sydney	0	2	Sydney Israeli Consulate and Hakoah Club bombings
1982		Soviet Union	Afghanistan	Kabul			
1983	February 23	Nicaragua	Peru	Lima	1	0	Civil Guard Evert Medrano was shot to death by three suspects while guarding the embassy, who took his submachine gun and escaped in a cream Volkswagen vehicle.
1983	April 18	United States	Lebanon	Beirut	64	120	1983 United States embassy bombing in Beirut
1983	July 27	Turkey	Portugal	Lisbon	7	2	1983 Turkish embassy attack in Lisbon
1983	August 27	Philippines	United States	Washington, D.C.	0		Three unidentified men hurled home made bombs into the lobby of the embassy.
1983	November 10	Honduras	Peru	Lima	0	0	The Honduran and U.S. embassies were attacked with dynamite between 8:40 and 9:30 p.m. Honduran ambassador Leiva and his son Yuri were at the chancery's lobby in Dos de Mayo Avenue when the explosives were thrown. Other attacks took place on the same night.
1983	November 10	United States	Peru	Lima			The Honduran and U.S. embassies were attacked with dynamite between 8:40 and 9:30 p.m. Honduran ambassador Leiva and his son Yuri were at the chancery's lobby in Dos de Mayo Avenue when the explosives were thrown. Other attacks took place on the same night.
1983	December 12	France	Kuwait	Kuwait City	0		1983 Kuwait bombings
1983	December 12	China	Kuwait	Kuwait City	6		1983 Kuwait bombings
1984	May 5	United States	Peru	Lima			The residence of the U.S. ambassador was attacked alongside a water treatment plant and a power station.
1984	July 11	Libya	Lebanon	Beirut	0	0	Done in protest of a visit by Libya's foreign minister.
1984	September 16	West Germany	Peru	Lima	0	0	An assassination attempt was made on the Civil Guard that was guarding the embassy.
1984	September 20	United States	Lebanon	Beirut	24	90	1984 United States embassy annex bombing in Beirut
1984	September 28	United States	Peru	Lima			Three MRTA members located at the Parque Neptuno, 120 metres from the embassy, shot at its façade at night with FN FAL rifles in response to comments made by then President Fernando Belaúnde during the United Nations General Assembly. Four arrests were made on the same day, with Belaúnde referring to the events as "criminal and cowardly."
1984	November 26	United States	Colombia	Bogotá	1	7	A bomb exploded on the street adjacent to the embassy, killing one Colombian woman. Drug traffickers were believed to be responsible.
1984	December 26	China	Peru	Lima			Explosives were thrown at the embassy and a restaurant.
1985	January 17	Chile	Peru	Lima	0	0	An assassination attempt was made on the Civil Guard that was guarding the embassy.
1985	March 12	Turkey	Canada	Ottawa	1	0	1985 attack on Turkish embassy in Ottawa
1985	May 15	United States	Peru	Lima	0	0	The terrorist group Shining Path bombed a number of targets in Lima, including the Soviet and Chinese embassies. Two sticks of dynamite were thrown over the wall of the U.S. ambassador's residence, causing no injuries. Two police stations were also bombed.
1985	May 15	China	Peru	Lima	0	0	The terrorist group Shining Path bombed a number of targets in Lima, including the Soviet and Chinese embassies. Two sticks of dynamite were thrown over the wall of the U.S. ambassador's residence, causing no injuries. Two police stations were also bombed.
1985	May 15	Soviet Union	Peru	Lima	0	0	The terrorist group Shining Path bombed a number of targets in Lima, including the Soviet and Chinese embassies. Two sticks of dynamite were thrown over the wall of the U.S. ambassador's residence, causing no injuries. Two police stations were also bombed.
1985	May 16	Colombia	Peru	Lima			A bomb was detonated at the embassy.
1985	May 20	Colombia	Peru	Lima			Molotov cocktails were thrown at the embassy.
1985	July 14	United States	Peru	Lima	0	0	The U.S. consulate in Miraflores was shot at with submachine guns.
1985	November 9	United States	Peru	Lima			The embassy was shot at from two cars.
1985	November 13	Colombia	Peru	Lima	1	0	A Civil Guard that was guarding the embassy (also reported as the consulate) was fatally shot in the head by MRTA members. Afterwards, the offices the Banco de Desarrollo in Juan de Arona avenue and that of Avianca, both in San Isidro were attacked, with graffiti against Belisario Betancur being painted on the latter's walls, all in response to the killing of M-19 guerrilla members in Bogotá.
1986	February 2	United States	Peru	Lima			A number of embassies were attacked with dynamite, as well as a number of government and private offices, including that of Xinhua News Agency.
1986	February 2	Spain	Peru	Lima			A number of embassies were attacked with dynamite, as well as a number of government and private offices, including that of Xinhua News Agency.
1986	February 2	India	Peru	Lima			A number of embassies were attacked with dynamite, as well as a number of government and private offices, including that of Xinhua News Agency.
1986	February 2	United Kingdom	Peru	Lima			A number of embassies were attacked with dynamite, as well as a number of government and private offices, including that of Xinhua News Agency.
1986	February 2	Chile	Peru	Lima			A number of embassies were attacked with dynamite, as well as a number of government and private offices, including that of Xinhua News Agency.
1986	February 2	West Germany	Peru	Lima			A number of embassies were attacked with dynamite, as well as a number of government and private offices, including that of Xinhua News Agency.
1986	February 2	Argentina	Peru	Lima			A number of embassies were attacked with dynamite, as well as a number of government and private offices, including that of Xinhua News Agency.
1986	April 3	Colombia	Peru	Lima			The embassy was attacked with dynamite, alongside offices belonging to ICPNA, IBM, APRA and Citibank, two Sears bank agencies, the LaSalle School, and a store.
1986	April 9-?	Nigeria	Philippines	Makati	0		100 Nigerian students seized and occupied the Nigerian embassy for days to protest alleged neglect of the diplomatic mission over their plight
1986	April 11	United States	Peru	Lima			Explosive devices were thrown at the U.S. and Venezuelan embassies at 10:45 p.m. as part of a series of nine attacks.
1986	April 11	Venezuela	Peru	Lima			Explosive devices were thrown at the U.S. and Venezuelan embassies at 10:45 p.m. as part of a series of nine attacks.
1986	April 15	France	Libya	Tripoli			During 1986 United States bombing of Libya
1986	April 21	United States	Peru	Lima			A car bomb placed by MRTA operatives and armed with 40 kg of dynamite destroyed the vehicle and parts of the back wall of the ambassador's residence, exploding five minutes after the end of curfew, in response to U.S. actions in Libya and in Nicaragua.
1986	June 22	Honduras	Peru	Lima			MRTA bombing carried out in rejection of a "submissive government" and "complicit" with the Reagan administration.
1986	July 4	China	Peru	Lima			The two embassies were attacked with dynamite, alongside the Soviet–Peruvian Cultural Centre and a monument to John F. Kennedy.
1986	July 4	Italy	Peru	Lima			The two embassies were attacked with dynamite, alongside the Soviet–Peruvian Cultural Centre and a monument to John F. Kennedy.
1986	July 7	Soviet Union	Peru	Lima	1	0	1986 Soviet embassy attack in Lima
1986	September 18	Chile	Peru	Lima	0	0	At 5:45 a.m., three members of the MRTA aboard a red Toyota threw dynamite at the main gate of the embassy, destroying it, with debris impacting the Los Ficus building, located nearby. The date was chosen due to it being the country's national holiday, with the fugitives throwing papers denouncing Augusto Pinochet's "fascist dictatorship." The ambassador's residence was also attacked.
1986	September 26	Bolivia	Peru	Lima			The embassy was attacked by the People's Revolutionary Command (Spanish: Comando revolucionario del pueblo).
1986	October 2	Egypt	Spain	Madrid	0	0	A shooting took place at embassy, then located at 60 Velázquez Street, between security personnel and militants who entered through a window, with no injuries.
1986	November	China	Indonesia	Jakarta			Japanese Red Army attack
1986	November	Canada	Indonesia	Jakarta			Japanese Red Army attack
1986	November	United States	Portugal	Lisbon			Forças Populares 25 de Abril attack
1986	November 23	Turkey	Australia	Melbourne	1		1986 Turkish consulate bombing in Melbourne
1987	January 26	India	Peru	Lima	3		The embassy in Miraflores was attacked between 2 and 5 p.m. with grenades and submachine guns during an official visit of then president Alan García to the Asian country as part of a series of attacks in different parts of the city. Earlier on the same day, newspapers announced that the government had extended its state of emergency for another 30 days. Civil Guards Segundo Rufasto Alarcón, Luis Salas and alférez Francisco Flores were killed during the attack.
1987	May 4	United States	Peru	Lima			A shootout took place near the U.S. ambassador's residence, at Petit Thouars Avenue. One of several shootings, some 15 explosions also took place, leaving nine departments in a blackout.
1987	April 30	North Korea	Peru	Lima	0	2	1987 North Korean embassy attack in Lima
1987	June	United States	Italy	Rome			(See: Japanese Red Army)
1987	June	United Kingdom	Italy	Rome			(See: Japanese Red Army)
1987		Kuwait	Iran	Tehran			In response to the 1987 Mecca Massacre
1987		Saudi Arabia	Iran	Tehran			In response to the 1987 Mecca Massacre
1987	September 11	South Korea	Peru	Lima	0	0	The embassy was attacked alongside two police stations and two electrical centres.
1987	October 8	Bolivia	Peru	Lima			High-potency explosives were used against diplomatic missions of the U.S. and Bolivia, the former being the consulate in Miraflores.
1987	October 8	United States	Peru	Lima			High-potency explosives were used against diplomatic missions of the U.S. and Bolivia, the former being the consulate in Miraflores.
1987	October 10	Soviet Union	Peru	Lima	0	0	Two Civil Guards that were guarding the embassy were unsuccessfully targeted by terrorists.
1987	November 18	United States	Peru	Lima	5		The embassy was attacked alongside a hotel, civil guards posted near the Ministry of Health, and a Nissan manufacturing plant, where one worker and four terrorists were killed.
1988		United States	Peru	Lima			
1988	June 9	United States	Peru	Lima	0	0	The residence of then ambassador Alexander Watson was shot at twice with homemade mortars mounted on vehicles by alleged MRTA members, who slightly damaged the building.
1988	October 2	United States	Peru	Lima			Two men were arrested while two others ran away.
1988	November 23	South Korea	Peru	Lima			An unsuccessful attempt was made to attack the embassy.
1988	December 6	Peru	Bolivia	La Paz	1		Assassination of Juan Carlos Vega Llona
1988		Soviet Union	Iran	Tehran			Due to alleged Soviet support for Iraq during the Iran–Iraq war
1989		Soviet Union	Afghanistan	Kabul			
1989	September 17	China	Colombia	Bogotá			Suspected FARC attack
1989	October 25	China	Peru	Lima	0	0	A coordinated attack by the Shining Path was carried out with explosives at 8:15 p.m. in Miraflores and San Isidro districts, against the embassies of the PRC and the USSR and a building where U.S. marines resided, causing material damages.
1989	October 25	Soviet Union	Peru	Lima	0	0	A coordinated attack by the Shining Path was carried out with explosives at 8:15 p.m. in Miraflores and San Isidro districts, against the embassies of the PRC and the USSR and a building where U.S. marines resided, causing material damages.
1990	February 14	United States	Peru	Lima	0	0	A bomb exploded outside the General Services Officer's warehouse door.
1990	March 31	South Africa	United Kingdom	London	0	0	During the Poll Tax Riots
1990	November 4	United States	Peru	Lima	0	0	An RPG-2 was fired towards the empty consulate at night.
1991	January 25	United States	Peru	Lima		1+	An hour after a car bomb exploded at Lima Airport, an RPG-7 was fired towards the embassy at 1:51 p.m. The six perpetrators travelled aboard a stolen four-door white Nissan pickup truck, firing the projectile and immediately continuing with small arms fire. MRTA literature and materials related to the Gulf War were found inside the vehicle. The attack indicated a departure from previous MRTA attacks, as it was possibly intended to cause harm rather than cause damage.
1991	December 20	Spain	Peru	Lima	0	0	The Spanish ambassador's residence was attacked with an explosive that only damaged the building's windows and surroundings, and did not manage to go over its two-metre-tall outer wall when thrown. Meanwhile, another device destroyed two cars parked behind the security fence at the French embassy. A woman who had appeared moments earlier claiming to have been raped nearby was detained.
1991	December 20	France	Peru	Lima	0	0	The Spanish ambassador's residence was attacked with an explosive that only damaged the building's windows and surroundings, and did not manage to go over its two-metre-tall outer wall when thrown. Meanwhile, another device destroyed two cars parked behind the security fence at the French embassy. A woman who had appeared moments earlier claiming to have been raped nearby was detained.
1991		Iraq	Finland	Helsinki			Iraqi Kurdish refugee protest on Kurdish massacre in Northern Iraq
1992	February 11	United States	Peru	Lima	2	2	A red car exploded in the posterior wall of the ambassador's residence, similar to the April 1986 attack, leaving a 20 foot-long section of the 10-foot-high wall and dealing considerable damage to the interior. Ambassador Anthony Quainton was not home at the time of the attack, which continued with the bombings of at least five banks and a movie theatre.
1992	March 17	Israel	Argentina	Buenos Aires	29	242	1992 Buenos Aires Israeli embassy bombing
1992	April 5	Iran	Canada	Ottawa			(See: Embassy of Iran, Ottawa)
1992	April 6	Iran	Australia	Canberra	0	1	
1992	April	Iran	Germany	Bonn, Hamburg	0	4	
1992	April	Iran	Czechoslovakia	Prague			
1992	April	Iran	Netherlands	The Hague			
1992	April	Iran	Ireland	Dublin	0	1	
1992	April	Iran	Poland	Warsaw	0	3	
1992	April	Iran	United Kingdom	London			
1992	April	Iran	United States	New York			
1992	22 July	Bolivia	Peru	Lima	0	5-16	1992 Bolivian embassy attack in Lima
1992	August	Peru	Sweden	Stockholm	0	0	1992 Peruvian embassy attack in Stockholm: A series of attacks against diplomatic missions of the country began with rebels painting red pro-Shining Path slogans on the building's façade and making an attempt on the life of the ambassador in Sweden that was thwarted by local police. The embassy in London was next, being shot at and also painted with slogans in early August. Similar attacks were made on a number of European embassies, while the mission in Mexico had dead dogs hung around it.
1992	August	Peru	United Kingdom	London			1992 Peruvian embassy attack in Stockholm: A series of attacks against diplomatic missions of the country began with rebels painting red pro-Shining Path slogans on the building's façade and making an attempt on the life of the ambassador in Sweden that was thwarted by local police. The embassy in London was next, being shot at and also painted with slogans in early August. Similar attacks were made on a number of European embassies, while the mission in Mexico had dead dogs hung around it.
1992	August	Peru	Spain	Madrid			1992 Peruvian embassy attack in Stockholm: A series of attacks against diplomatic missions of the country began with rebels painting red pro-Shining Path slogans on the building's façade and making an attempt on the life of the ambassador in Sweden that was thwarted by local police. The embassy in London was next, being shot at and also painted with slogans in early August. Similar attacks were made on a number of European embassies, while the mission in Mexico had dead dogs hung around it.
1992	August	Peru	Belgium	Brussels			1992 Peruvian embassy attack in Stockholm: A series of attacks against diplomatic missions of the country began with rebels painting red pro-Shining Path slogans on the building's façade and making an attempt on the life of the ambassador in Sweden that was thwarted by local police. The embassy in London was next, being shot at and also painted with slogans in early August. Similar attacks were made on a number of European embassies, while the mission in Mexico had dead dogs hung around it.
1992	August	Peru	Italy	Rome			1992 Peruvian embassy attack in Stockholm: A series of attacks against diplomatic missions of the country began with rebels painting red pro-Shining Path slogans on the building's façade and making an attempt on the life of the ambassador in Sweden that was thwarted by local police. The embassy in London was next, being shot at and also painted with slogans in early August. Similar attacks were made on a number of European embassies, while the mission in Mexico had dead dogs hung around it.
1992	August	Peru	Germany	Berlin			1992 Peruvian embassy attack in Stockholm: A series of attacks against diplomatic missions of the country began with rebels painting red pro-Shining Path slogans on the building's façade and making an attempt on the life of the ambassador in Sweden that was thwarted by local police. The embassy in London was next, being shot at and also painted with slogans in early August. Similar attacks were made on a number of European embassies, while the mission in Mexico had dead dogs hung around it.
1992	August	Peru	Switzerland	Bern			1992 Peruvian embassy attack in Stockholm: A series of attacks against diplomatic missions of the country began with rebels painting red pro-Shining Path slogans on the building's façade and making an attempt on the life of the ambassador in Sweden that was thwarted by local police. The embassy in London was next, being shot at and also painted with slogans in early August. Similar attacks were made on a number of European embassies, while the mission in Mexico had dead dogs hung around it.
1992	August	Peru	France	Paris			1992 Peruvian embassy attack in Stockholm: A series of attacks against diplomatic missions of the country began with rebels painting red pro-Shining Path slogans on the building's façade and making an attempt on the life of the ambassador in Sweden that was thwarted by local police. The embassy in London was next, being shot at and also painted with slogans in early August. Similar attacks were made on a number of European embassies, while the mission in Mexico had dead dogs hung around it.
1992	August	Peru	Denmark	Copenhagen			1992 Peruvian embassy attack in Stockholm: A series of attacks against diplomatic missions of the country began with rebels painting red pro-Shining Path slogans on the building's façade and making an attempt on the life of the ambassador in Sweden that was thwarted by local police. The embassy in London was next, being shot at and also painted with slogans in early August. Similar attacks were made on a number of European embassies, while the mission in Mexico had dead dogs hung around it.
1992	August	Peru	Mexico	Mexico City			1992 Peruvian embassy attack in Stockholm: A series of attacks against diplomatic missions of the country began with rebels painting red pro-Shining Path slogans on the building's façade and making an attempt on the life of the ambassador in Sweden that was thwarted by local police. The embassy in London was next, being shot at and also painted with slogans in early August. Similar attacks were made on a number of European embassies, while the mission in Mexico had dead dogs hung around it.
1992	December 26	China	Peru	Lima	0	0	Simultaneous attacks: On December 26, the anniversary of Mao Zedong's birth, Shining Path members detonated a number of car bombs next to diplomatic missions in Lima. At 5:45 a.m., the one at the Chinese embassy partially detonated with no casualties or major damage. Around the same time, the Costa Rican embassy and the Austrian consulate in Miraflores followed, causing material damage, followed by another one at the German embassy. On the 28th, at approximately 9:40 a.m., the Japanese embassy and an adjacent house were bombed after being shot at, with the Chinese embassy following suit 20 minutes later with material damage.
1992	December 26	Costa Rica	Peru	Lima	0	0	
1992	December 26	Austria	Peru	Lima	0	0	
1992	December 26	Germany	Peru	Lima	0	0	
1992	December 28	China	Peru	Lima	0	0	
1992	December 28	Japan	Peru	Lima	0	8–20	
1993	March 8	Nicaragua	Costa Rica	San Jose			Contra rebels seized the embassy along with eight hostages.
1993	July 27	China	Peru	Lima			Shining Path attack.
1993	July 27	United States	Peru	Lima	0	2	Shining Path attack.
1994	26 July	Israel	United Kingdom	London	0	20	1994 London Israeli Embassy bombing
1995		China	Nicaragua	Managua	0		
1995	17 June	France	Australia	Perth	0	0	1995 French consulate bombing in Perth
1995	November 19	Egypt	Pakistan	Islamabad	19	~60	Attack on the Egyptian Embassy in Pakistan
1995	6 September	Pakistan	Afghanistan	Kabul	1	26	1995 attack on the Embassy of Pakistan in Kabul
1995	September 13	United States	Russia	Moscow			Suspected Chechen attack
1996	June 22	Honduras	Peru	Lima			Dynamite was thrown at the embassy, damaging its front door, in a series of attacks that also targeted popular restaurant La Rosa Náutica, and a number of APRA offices, alongside other places.
1996	December 17 – April 22 (1997)	Japan	Peru	Lima	3		Hostage crisis at the Japanese ambassador's residence
1998		Russia	Latvia	Riga	0		1998 Riga bombing
1998		Iran	Afghanistan	Mazari Sharif	11		1998 killing of Iranian diplomats in Afghanistan
1998	June 21	United States	Lebanon	Beirut			Hezbollah attack
1998	August 7	United States	Kenya	Nairobi	212	4000+	1998 United States embassy bombings
1998	August 7	United States	Tanzania	Dar es Salaam	11	85	1998 United States embassy bombings
1999	May 7	China	Serbia and Montenegro	Belgrade	3	27	United States bombing of the Chinese embassy in Belgrade
1999	May 15	United States	China	Beijing	0		In response to the U.S. bombing of the Chinese embassy in Belgrade
1999	May 15	Serbia and Montenegro	China	Beijing	0		In response to the U.S. bombing of the Chinese embassy in Belgrade
1999		Myanmar	Thailand	Bangkok	0		1999 attack on the Myanmar Embassy in Bangkok
2000	August 1	Philippines	Indonesia	Jakarta	2	21	Philippine consulate bombing in Jakarta
2002	January 22	United States	India	Kolkata	5		Attack by gunmen on the American Centre in Kolkata.
2002	March 20	United States	Peru	Lima	9	32	2002 Lima bombing
2002	April 12	Cuba	Venezuela	Caracas	0		Part of the 2002 Venezuelan coup d'état attempt
2002	June 14	United States	Pakistan	Karachi	12		2002 US consulate bombing in Karachi
2002	October 12	Philippines	Indonesia	Manado			
2002	October 12	United States	Indonesia	Denpasar			A bomb detonated outside the US Consular Office as part of the 2002 Bali bombings
2003	January 29	Thailand	Cambodia	Phnom Penh	0	0	2003 Phnom Penh riots
2003	February 25	Colombia	Venezuela	Caracas	0	0	
2003	February 25	Spain	Venezuela	Caracas	0	0	
2003	February 28	Czech Republic	Pakistan	Islamabad	2	0	Suspected Al-Qaeda attack
2003	July 9	Pakistan	Afghanistan	Kabul	0	0	2003 attack on Pakistan Embassy in Kabul
2003	August 7	Jordan	Iraq	Baghdad	17		2003 Jordanian embassy bombing in Baghdad
2003	October 14	Turkey	Iraq	Baghdad	1		Turkish embassy bombing in Baghdad
2003	November 20	United Kingdom	Turkey	Istanbul	71		2003 Istanbul bombings
2004	July 27	Chile	Costa Rica	San José	4		Costa Rican police officer assigned to the embassy took 9 employees hostages, killing 3 Chilean diplomats and himself after a 7-hour standoff
2004	July 30	Israel	Uzbekistan	Tashkent	2	7	Tashkent embassy bombings
2004	July 30	United States	Uzbekistan	Tashkent	2	2	Tashkent embassy bombings
2004	September 9	Australia	Indonesia	Jakarta	9	150	2004 Australian Embassy bombing in Jakarta
2004		Greece	Saudi Arabia	Riyadh			
2005	January 19	Australia	Iraq	Baghdad	2	8	19 January 2005 Baghdad bombings
2006	February 4	Denmark	Syria	Damascus	0	0	Jyllands-Posten Muhammad cartoons controversy: Thousands of protesters in Damascus attacked and set fire to the Danish and Norwegian embassies, later moving toward the French embassy; the building housing the Chilean and Swedish embassies was also damaged. The unrest was caused by outrage over controversial caricatures of the Prophet Muhammad first published in a Danish newspaper.
2006	February 4	Norway	Syria	Damascus	0	0	Jyllands-Posten Muhammad cartoons controversy: Thousands of protesters in Damascus attacked and set fire to the Danish and Norwegian embassies, later moving toward the French embassy; the building housing the Chilean and Swedish embassies was also damaged. The unrest was caused by outrage over controversial caricatures of the Prophet Muhammad first published in a Danish newspaper.
2006	February 4	Sweden	Syria	Damascus	0	0	Jyllands-Posten Muhammad cartoons controversy: Thousands of protesters in Damascus attacked and set fire to the Danish and Norwegian embassies, later moving toward the French embassy; the building housing the Chilean and Swedish embassies was also damaged. The unrest was caused by outrage over controversial caricatures of the Prophet Muhammad first published in a Danish newspaper.
2006	February 4	Chile	Syria	Damascus	0	0	Jyllands-Posten Muhammad cartoons controversy: Thousands of protesters in Damascus attacked and set fire to the Danish and Norwegian embassies, later moving toward the French embassy; the building housing the Chilean and Swedish embassies was also damaged. The unrest was caused by outrage over controversial caricatures of the Prophet Muhammad first published in a Danish newspaper.
2006	February 7	Denmark	Iran	Tehran			Jyllands-Posten Muhammad cartoons controversy
2006	March 2	China	Pakistan	Karachi	4		Suspected Al-Qaeda attack
2006	September 12	China	Syria	Damascus	4		
2006		Denmark	Lebanon	Beirut			Jyllands-Posten Muhammad cartoons controversy
2006		Denmark	Syria	Damascus			Jyllands-Posten Muhammad cartoons controversy
2006		Italy	Libya	Benghazi			
2006		Pakistan	Sri Lanka	Colombo			Attack on Pakistani ambassador to Sri Lanka
2007		United States	Greece	Athens	0		(see: Embassy of the United States, Athens)
2007		Spain	Democratic Republic of the Congo	Kinshasa			
2007		Russia	Costa Rica	San José			Hostage situation.
2007		China	India	New Delhi			
2008		United States	Serbia	Belgrade	1	February	2008 Serbia protests
2008		China	Serbia	Belgrade	1	February	2008 Serbia protests
2008		Croatia	Serbia	Belgrade	1	February	2008 Serbia protests
2008		Slovenia	Serbia	Belgrade	1	February	2008 Serbia protests
2008	March 10	China	Canada	Toronto			2008 Tibetan unrest
2008	March 11	China	United States	Washington D.C.			2008 Tibetan unrest
2008	March 14	China	Canada	Calgary			2008 Tibetan unrest
2008	March 15	China	Australia	Sydney		1	2008 Tibetan unrest
2008	March 16	China	France	Paris			2008 Tibetan unrest
2008	March 20	China	Austria	Vienna			2008 Tibetan unrest
2008		China	Hungary	Budapest			2008 Tibetan unrest
2008		China	Netherlands	The Hague			2008 Tibetan unrest
2008		China	Switzerland	Zürich			2008 Tibetan unrest
2008		Japan	Mauritania	Nouakchott			2008 Tibetan unrest
2008		Denmark	Pakistan	Islamabad	7	24	2008 Danish embassy bombing in Islamabad
2008		India	Afghanistan	Kabul	58	141	2008 Indian embassy bombing in Kabul
2008	October	Turkey	Finland	Helsinki			part of Kurdish–Turkish conflict
2008		China	Turkey	Istanbul	6		
2008	October 29	Ethiopia	Somalia	Hargeisa	30		2008 Hargeisa–Bosaso bombings
2008		Greece	Germany	Berlin			
2009		France	Mauritania	Nouakchott	3		2009 Nouakchott suicide bombing
2009		Denmark	Sweden	Stockholm			Deportation of Iraqi refugees
2009	February 4	Holy See	Venezuela	Caracas			
2009	February 18	Pakistan	Iran	Tehran			2009 attack on Pakistan Embassy in Tehran
2009	August 26	Slovakia	Hungary	Budapest			2009 attack on Slovak Embassy in Budapest
2009	July 5	China	United States	Los Angeles			July 2009 Ürümqi riots
2009	July 6	China	Germany	Munich			July 2009 Ürümqi riots
2009	July 6	China	Netherlands	Amsterdam			July 2009 Ürümqi riots
2009	July 7	China	Norway	Oslo			July 2009 Ürümqi riots
2009	July 13	China	Turkey	Ankara			July 2009 Ürümqi riots
2009	August 25	Greece	Serbia	Belgrade			Molotov cocktails attack by anarchists in support of Greek riots.
2009	October 8	India	Afghanistan	Kabul	17		2009 Kabul Indian embassy attack
2010		Bulgaria	Greece	Athens			by Conspiracy of Fire Nuclei
2010		Japan	Greece	Athens			by Conspiracy of Fire Nuclei
2010		Chile	Greece	Athens			by Conspiracy of Fire Nuclei
2010		Nigeria	Greece	Athens			by Conspiracy of Fire Nuclei
2010		South Korea	Greece	Athens			by Conspiracy of Fire Nuclei
2010	November 1	Mexico	Greece	Athens	0	1	by Conspiracy of Fire Nuclei
2010		Russia	Greece	Athens			by Conspiracy of Fire Nuclei
2010		Hungary	Greece	Athens			by Conspiracy of Fire Nuclei
2010		Morocco	Greece	Athens			by Conspiracy of Fire Nuclei
2010		Hungary	Italy	Rome			The Informal Anarchist Federation claimed credit for these mail bombs.
2010		Chile	Italy	Rome			The Informal Anarchist Federation claimed credit for these mail bombs.
2010		Greece	Italy	Rome			Alleged explosive device defused by Italian police
2010		France	Mali	Bamako			
2010	11 May	Pakistan	Iran	Tehran	0	1	2010 attack on Pakistan ambassador to Iran
2010	April 5	United States	Pakistan	Peshawar	6		5 April 2010 North-West Frontier Province attacks
2010	26 February	India	Afghanistan	Kabul	18 (9 Indians)		February 2010 Kabul attack
2011	26 May	Serbia	Russia	Moscow			Attacked by National Bolshevik Party activists as a response to arrest of Ratko Mladić.
2011		France	Syria	Damascus			part of the Syrian civil war
2011		United States	Syria	Damascus			part of the Syrian civil war
2011	9–10 September	Israel	Egypt	Cairo	3	1049	2011 attack on Israeli Embassy in Egypt
2011		United States	Afghanistan	Kabul			2011 Kabul Attacks
2011		United States	Bosnia and Herzegovina	Sarajevo			
2011		France	Syria	Damascus			part of the Syrian civil war
2011		Turkey	Syria	Damascus			part of the Syrian civil war
2011		Saudi Arabia	Syria	Damascus			part of the Syrian civil war
2011	29 November	United Kingdom	Iran	Tehran	0	23	2011 attack on the British Embassy in Iran
2012	January 8	Japan	South Korea	Seoul	0	0	A Chinese man hurled four petrol bombs at the Japanese mission in protest of Japan's war crimes during the World War II.
2012		Belarus	Kyrgyzstan	Bishkek			
2012		China	Libya	Tripoli			
2012	July 9	Japan	South Korea	Seoul			
2012	September 11	United States	Libya	Benghazi	4	4 (possibly as many as 30)	U.S. Consulate attack in Benghazi. Official and unofficial accounts vary on the number of Americans injured, from 4 to as many as 30.
2012	September 12	United States	Egypt	Cairo			2012 attack on the American Embassy in Egypt
2012	September 13	United States	Yemen	Sana'a	4	35	2012 attack on the American Embassy in Yemen
2012	September 14	United States	India	Chennai	0	25	
2012	September 14	Germany	Sudan	Khartoum	0	0	2012 attack on the German Embassy in Sudan
2012	September 14	United Kingdom	Sudan	Khartoum	2		
2012	September 15	United States	Tunisia	Tunis	4	46	
2012		Japan	China	Shenyang	0		2012 attack on the Japanese Consulate in Shenyang
2013	February 1	China	Turkey	Ankara	2		
2013	April 23	France	Libya	Tripoli	0		AQIM car-bombing attack
2013	July 25	United Arab Emirates	Libya	Tripoli	0		Rocket-propelled grenade attack.
2013	June 29	Pakistan	Libya	Tripoli			2013 attack on Pakistan Embassy in Tripoli
2013	August 3	India	Afghanistan	Jalalabad	9	21	
2013	August 7	Pakistan	India	New Delhi			2013 attack on Pakistan Embassy in New Delhi
2013	September 13	United States	Afghanistan	Herat	2	20	2013 attack on U.S. consulate in Herat
2013	October 3	Russia	Libya	Tripoli	1		
2013	October 11	Sweden	Libya	Benghazi	0	0	A car bomb exploded outside Sweden's honorary consulate in Benghazi, Libya, causing significant damage to the building but no reported injuries. The explosion shattered windows and destroyed the entrance, but consulate staff remained unharmed.
2013	November 5	Sweden	Syria	Damascus			
2013	November 8	Serbia	Croatia	Rijeka			
2013	November 11	Russia	Poland	Warsaw			
2013	November 19	Iran	Lebanon	Beirut	20+	50+	Iranian embassy bombings
2013	December 19	Pakistan	Bangladesh	Dhaka			2013 siege of the Pakistani embassy in Dhaka
2014	May 22	India	Afghanistan	Herat			2014 attack on Indian consulate in Herat, Afghanistan
2014	June 14	Russia	Ukraine	Kyiv	0	0	Attack following the downing of a plane with 49 Ukrainian troops near Luhansk carried out by pro-Russian militants using weapon probably from Russia.
2014	November 13	Egypt	Libya	Tripoli	0	0	
2014	November 13	United Arab Emirates	Libya	Tripoli	0	0	
2014	November 28	Mexico	United States	Austin	1 (including attacker)	0	A man attempted to set the Mexican embassy on fire. He was shot and killed by responding police officers.
2015	January 17	Algeria	Libya	Tripoli	0	3	
2015	February 22	Iran	Libya	Tripoli	0	0	
2015	April 12	South Korea	Libya	Tripoli	2	1	
2015	April 13	Morocco	Libya	Tripoli	0	0	
2015	April 21	Spain	Libya	Tripoli	0	0	
2015	June 12	Tunisia	Libya	Tripoli	0	0	
2015	June 24	United Arab Emirates	Somalia	Mogadishu	3	7	
2015	July 8	Thailand	Turkey	Istanbul			6th anniversary of the Ürümqi riots
2015	July 9	China	Turkey	Ankara			6th anniversary of the Ürümqi riots
2015	July 11	Italy	Egypt	Cairo	1	4	Suspected ISIS attack
2015	July 24	China	Australia	Sydney	0	1	7th anniversary of the 2008 Tibetan unrest
2015	July 26	China	Somalia	Mogadishu	12	0	Suspected Al-Shabaab attack
2015	July 29	Niger	Egypt	Cairo	1	2	Suspected Al Qaeda attack
2015	August 10	Portugal	Turkey	Istanbul	0	1	Suspected DHKP-C attack
2015	September 20	Russia	Syria	Damascus	0	0	
2015	September 28	United States	Uzbekistan	Tashkent	0	1	Firebomb attack possibly by IMU or IS Terrorist Group
2015	November 25	Turkey	Russia	Moscow	0	0	Attack following the downing a bomber aircraft by Turkey near the border between Syria and Turkey
2015	December 11	Spain	Afghanistan	Kabul	2	9	2015 Spanish Embassy attack in Kabul
2016	January 3	Saudi Arabia	Iran	Tehran and Mashhad	0	0	2016 attack on the Saudi diplomatic missions in Iran
2016	May 11	Australia	Iraq	Baghdad	1	0	Security contractor shot dead. investigation underway.
2016	August 30	China	Kyrgyzstan	Bishkek	1	3	
2016	November 10	Germany	Afghanistan	Mazar-i-Sharif	6	120	German consulate in Mazar-i-Sharif attack: Taliban truck bombing
2017	March 29	Poland	Ukraine	Lutsk	0	0	Polish consulate in Lutsk was attacked with grenade launcher
2018	March 11	Iran	Austria	Vienna	1 (perpetrator)	1	Soldier posted outside Iranian Embassy in Vienna was attacked by a knife-wielding Egyptian national with Islamist sympathies. Attacker was shot and killed.
2018	September 7	Iran	Iraq	Basra			Protesters torched the Iranian consulate.
2018	November 23	China	Pakistan	Karachi	4	1	Karachi Chinese consulate attack by the Balochistan Liberation Army
2019	February 22	North Korea	Spain	Madrid	0	8	North Korean Embassy in Madrid incident: 10 men forcibly entered the North Korean embassy in Madrid and beat and tied up eight diplomats within, before stealing computers and files.
2019	September 5	South Africa	Democratic Republic of the Congo	Lubumbashi	0	0	Protestors attack the South African consulate to protest against xenophobic attacks in South Africa.
2019	November 3	Iran	Iraq	Karbala	3	0	During the 2019 Iraqi protests
2019	November 10	Venezuela	Bolivia	La Paz			During the 2019 Bolivian protests, a group attacked and took control of the Venezuelan embassy building.
2019	November 27	Iran	Iraq	Najaf			Amid antigovernment protests in Iraq focusing on government dysfunction, corruption, and Iranian influence over the Iraqi government, a crowd of Iraqi demonstrators (almost all Shia Muslim) burned down the Iranian consulate in Najaf in southern Iraq. Najaf police said that 35 protesters and 32 members of Iraqi security forces were injuries. No Iranian personnel were in the consulate during the attack, as consulate staff fled just beforehand.
2019	December 1	Iran	Iraq	Najaf			The Iranian consulate in Najaf was torched by an angry crowd of Iraqis a second time.
2019	December 31	China	Iraq	Baghdad			Anti-Chinese and anti-communist protesters torched the Chinese embassy after a rumor that China killed four Kata'ib Hezbollah members who were hiding in Xinjiang.
2020	February 10	Iran	Nigeria	Abuja			During a protest against the Shiite Islamic Movement of Nigeria and the anniversary of the Iranian Revolution, angry crowds of Nigerians stormed the embassy.
2021	July 7	Taiwan	Haiti	Pétion-Ville			During the Assassination of Jovenel Moïse
2021	July 13	Cuba	Peru	Lima	0	0	The embassy was vandalised by unknown attackers who escaped in a car.
2021	July 27	Cuba	France	Paris	0	o	The embassy was firebombed by molotovs to protest against the Communist Party of Cuba
2022	March 1	Slovenia	Ukraine	Kharkiv	0	0	The consulate was destroyed during the air strikes against the city with no injuries reported by the country's foreign ministry.
2022	April 20	Peru	United States	Washington, D.C.	1	0	A man broke into the ambassador's residence in Forest Hills at around 8 a.m. and started breaking doors and windows while the building was occupied by the diplomat and his family, causing the arrival of local Secret Service and Police units, who fatally shot the intruder when he attempted to charge at them.
2022	September 5	Russia	Afghanistan	Kabul	8	15	Bombing of the Russian embassy in Kabul
2022	October 6	Germany	Ukraine	Kyiv	0		A Russian missile struck a building in the German embassy complex during the offensive against the city.
2022	December 20	Finland	Russia	Moscow	0	0	Attack possibly by the Wagner Group, however, no personal or material damage was caused to the embassy.
2023	January 27	Azerbaijan	Iran	Tehran	1	2	Attack on the Azerbaijani Embassy in Tehran
2023	May 20	Qatar	Sudan	Khartoum			Battle of Khartoum
2023	June 28	United States	Saudi Arabia	Jeddah	2 (including attacker)	0	2023 Jeddah shooting
2023	July 19	Sweden	Iraq	Baghdad	0	0	Demonstrators stormed the embassy in protest over the burning of the Koran in Stockholm on 28 June.
2023	July 20	China	Ukraine	Odesa	0	0	The Chinese consulate-general was damaged by air strikes against the city, with at least one window broken. No casualties were reported at the site, although three people were killed on the same night.
2023	July 30	France	Niger	Niamey	0	0	Pro-coup and pro-Russian protestors surrounded and attempted to set fire to the embassy, prompting partial evacuations of both the French and US embassies.
2023		China	Russia	Saint Petersburg	0	0	A rocket was fired at the Chinese consulate in Saint Petersburg. There was superficial damage to the building but no one was injured.
2023	August 9	United States	Canada	Toronto	0	0	A smoke bomb was thrown at the US consulate in Toronto.
2023	August 10	Sweden	Lebanon	Beirut	0	0	On the night of August 10, 2023, an attempted attack on the Swedish embassy in Beirut, Lebanon, occurred. Police suspect that someone threw a bomb at the embassy, but it was removed before it exploded. No one was injured in the incident. Lebanese police believe the attack was motivated by the Quran burnings in Sweden.
2023	September 24	Cuba	United States	Washington, D.C.	0	0	Two Molotov cocktails were thrown at the Cuban embassy.
2023	September 25	China	United States	Washington, D.C.	0	0	A man from Florida attempted to set off a bag of explosives outside the Chinese embassy. The same suspect had previously detonated explosives next to a statue mocking Mao Zedong in San Antonio. He had blamed the Chinese government for the death of his father, who died of COVID-19.
2023	October 12	China	United States	San Francisco	1 (the attacker)	0	Chinese citizen Zhanyuan Yang crashed a car into the lobby of the Chinese consulate. The police struggled to restrain him and shot him after seeing that he had a knife.
2023	December 8	United States	Iraq	Baghdad	0	0	Rockets were fired toward the embassy causing material damage.
2024	April 1	Iran	Syria	Damascus	16		The Israeli airstrike on the Iranian consulate in Damascus destroyed the building housing its consular section and killed sixteen people. Iran launched 300 drones and missiles at Israel in retaliation.
2024	April 5	Mexico	Ecuador	Quito	0	1+	2024 attack on the Mexican embassy in Ecuador: Officers of the Ecuadorian police stormed and invaded the Mexican embassy in Quito to capture former Ecuadorian Vice President Jorge Glas, who is accused of corruption. The operation prompted Mexico to sever diplomatic relations with Ecuador.
2024	June 29	Israel	Serbia	Belgrade	1	1	2024 attack on the Israeli embassy in Belgrade
2024	September 29	United Arab Emirates	Sudan	Khartoum	0	0	The UAE alleged that the Sudanese air force bombed the UAE ambassador's residence in Khartoum. Sudan denied attacking the residence and blamed the Rapid Support Forces.
2024	December 2	Bangladesh	India	Tripura	0	0	2024 attack on the Bangladesh Assistant High Commission in India
2025	January 11	Venezuela	Portugal	Lisbon	0	0	A Molotov cocktail was thrown at the Venezuelan consulate.
2026	February 28	United States	Iraq	Erbil	0	0	During the 2026 Iran war, Iranian aerial attacks targeted infrastructure hosting US military and civilian personnel at the United States Consulate General in Erbil.
2026	March 1	United States	Pakistan	Karachi	16	60+	2026 attack on the United States consulate in Karachi
2026	March 2	United States	Saudi Arabia	Riyadh	0	0	During the 2026 Iran war, the United States embassy in Riyadh was targeted by two Iranian drones causing a fire.
2026	March 2	United States	Kuwait	Kuwait City	0	0	During the 2026 Iran war, the Embassy of the United States, Kuwait City was hit by an Iranian missile strike.
2026	March 3	United States	Saudi Arabia	Riyadh	0	0	During the 2026 Iran war, an Iranian drone attacked the United States embassy in Riyadh, causing minor damage.
2026	March 3	United States	United Arab Emirates	Dubai	0	0	During the 2026 Iran war, an Iranian drone strike on the United States consulate in Dubai caused a fire to break out.
2026	March 7	United States	Iraq	Baghdad	0	0	During the 2026 Iran war, an Iranian missile struck the Embassy of the United States, Baghdad.
2026	March 8	United States	Norway	Oslo	0	0	The US embassy in Oslo was hit by an explosion causing minor damage.
2026	March 8	Russia	Iran	Isfahan	0		
2026	March 10	United Arab Emirates	Iraq	Erbil	0	0	Two drones targeted the United Arab Emirates consulate in Erbil.
2026	March 10	United States	Canada	Toronto	0	0	Shots were Fired at United States Consulate in Toronto.
2026	March 11	United States	Iraq	Baghdad	0	0	During the 2026 Iran war, a pro-Tehran militia drone struck the United States Baghdad Diplomatic Support Center.
2026	March 14	United States	Iraq	Baghdad	0	0	During the 2026 Iran war, a missile struck the United States embassy in Baghdad.
2026	March 14	United Arab Emirates	Iraq	Erbil	0	2	Iranian drones targeted the United Arab Emirates consulate in Erbil.
2026	March 17	United States	Iraq	Baghdad	0	0	During the 2026 Iran war, a pro-Tehran militia drone struck the United States embassy in Baghdad.
2026	July 24	Latvia	Ukraine	Sloviansk	0	2	Russian airstrikes hit the Latvia's Honorary Consulate and surrounding area in Sloviansk, Ukraine, killing six civilians and wounding dozens. At the Consulate two members of staff were injured.
2026	July 27	United States	Canada	Toronto	0	0	Shots were Fired at United States Consulate in Toronto.

== See also ==
- Havana syndrome – mysterious disease affecting US and Canadian staff, starting in Havana, Cuba
