= 1989 Callao bombing =

Terrorist attack in Callao, Peru

- Part of the Internal conflict in Peru
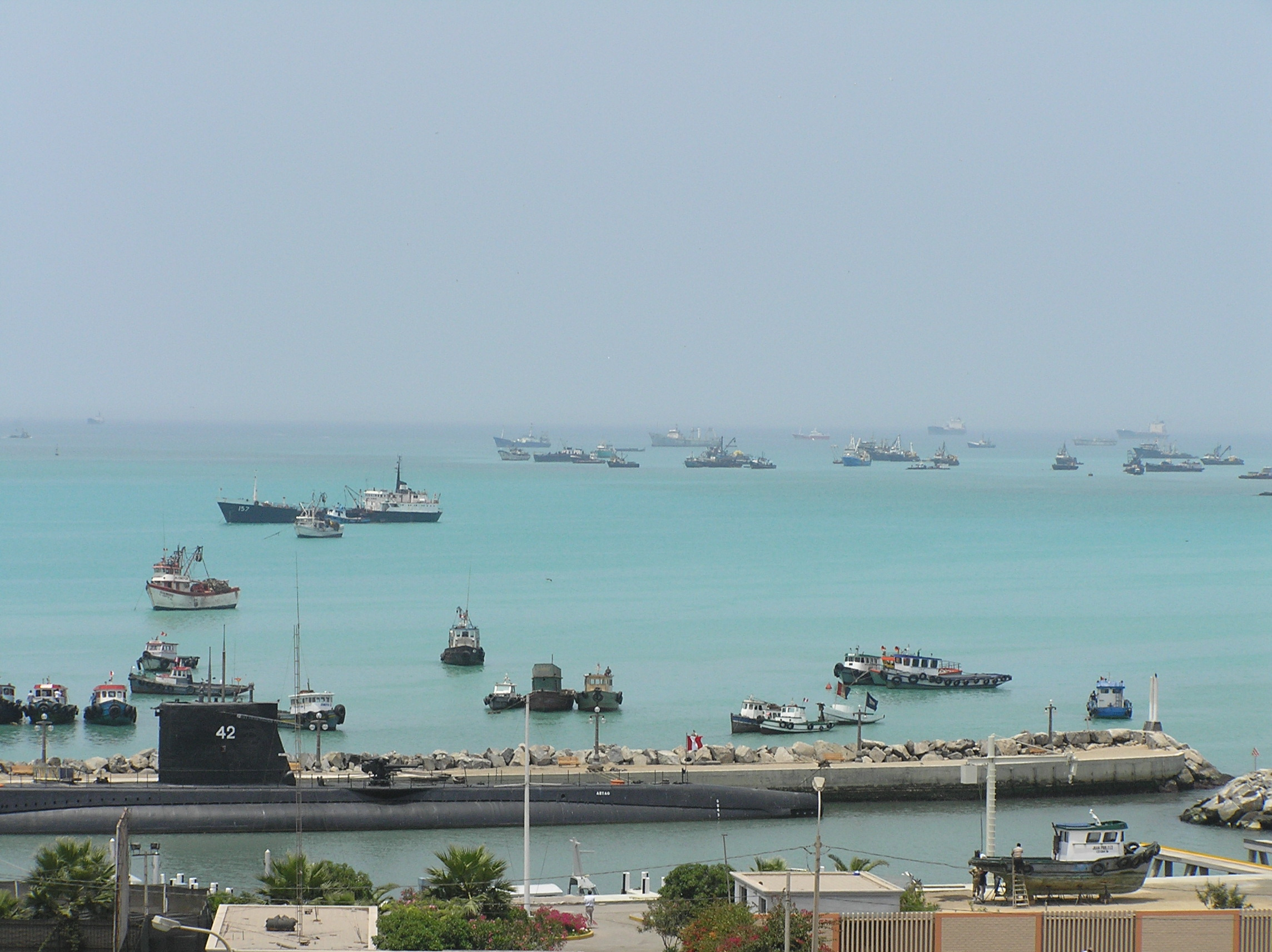
- The port in 2005
- Location: 12°4′0.08″S 77°9′0″W; Port of Callao, Peru
- Date: July 5, 1989 (EDT)
- Target: Soviet citizens
- Attack type: Bombing; Communist terrorism
- Deaths: 0
- Injuries: 33
- Perpetrator: Shining Path (alleged)

The 1989 Callao bombing was a terrorist attack that occurred on July 5, 1989, in the vicinity of the port of Callao, the main seaport of Peru. The attack targeted Soviet seamen who were stationed in the port, along with their wives.

== Background ==
Relations between the governments of Peru and the Soviet Union had become stronger after Mikhail Gorbachev came to power. The two countries reached an economic agreement to allow approximately 20 trawlers to fish in the waters of the Constitutional Province of Callao in exchange for a percentage of the fishing remaining in the port. Likewise, the Soviet fishermen had permission to land on the Peruvian shore, and several shops in Callao catering exclusively to Soviet visitors were opened.

Politically, the Gorbachev government gave support to the Alan García government by taking a stand in its favor in the war against the communist insurgency of Sendero Luminoso and the Túpac Amaru Revolutionary Movement. In addition, the Soviet government sold helicopters to García to undermine the insurgency. This caused SL to take a militant stance against USSR interests in Peru, to the point of despising even civilians of Russian nationality in the South American country.

In 1986, supporters of Sendero Luminoso (SL) had exploded a bomb targeting Soviet citizens engaged in fishing who had permission from the Peruvian government to be stationed in the port of Callao. That same year, SL militants attempted to carry out a massacre at the Soviet embassy in Lima, failing in their attempt.

== Attack ==
On July 5, 1989, three buses were in a part of the Port of Callao that facilitated Soviet fishermen and sailors between Callao and Lima who had landing permission as agreed between the Peruvian and Soviet governments. The foreigners were visiting a craft shop near the buses. When the Soviets were boarding the vehicles, an explosion occurred under the largest bus. The impact of this explosion destroyed the façade of the three-story craft store that the victims had recently departed from.

The other two smaller buses with 35 passengers each were also affected, but the largest bus was the most affected, with its 49 passengers being evacuated to hospitals in Lima. All the seriously injured were on the largest bus, with 20 injuries being first reported, later rising to 33, four of whom were in a critical state.

== Aftermath ==
No terrorist organization officially claimed responsibility for the attack, but the Ministry of the Interior reported that the modus operandi of the attack was that of Sendero Luminoso. The then PNP officer Oswaldo Díaz Salvador said that witnesses reported that two young people were seen placing a package on the bottom of the large bus in the vicinity of the attack site at a time the Soviets were not in their vehicles. The Peruvian National Police said that four people were being sought, saying that two more suspects fled in a car immediately after the explosion.

Attacks against the USSR continued, as the Soviet embassy was again bombed in October 1989.

== See also ==
- 1986 Soviet embassy attack in Lima
- 1987 North Korean embassy attack in Lima
- Japanese embassy hostage crisis
