= Bogomazov =

Bogomazov (masculine, Russian: Богомазов) or Bogomazova (feminine, Russian: Богомазова) is a Russian patronymic surname literally meaning "son of bogomaz" (Russian: богомаз), the latter meaning "icon painter". Notable people with the surname include:

- Alexander Bogomazov (1880–1930), Ukrainian Soviet artist
- Anna Bogomazova (born 1990), Russian kickboxer, martial artist and professional wrestler
- Valentin Bogomazov (1943–2019), Russian diplomat, ambassador to Ecuador and Peru
- Yelena Bogomazova (born 1982), Russian swimmer

== See also ==
- Bogomaz
