= List of ambassadors of Russia to Ecuador =

Ambassador of the Russian Federation to the Republic of Ecuador
- Emblem of the Russian Foreign Ministry
- Incumbent; Vladimir Sprinchan since 10 February 2021
- Ministry of Foreign Affairs; Embassy of Russia in Quito
- Style: His Excellency
- Reports to: Minister of Foreign Affairs
- Seat: Quito
- Appointer: President of Russia
- Term length: At the pleasure of the president
- Website: Embassy of Russia in Ecuador

The ambassador extraordinary and plenipotentiary of the Russian Federation to the Republic of Ecuador is the official representative of the president and the government of the Russian Federation to the president and the government of Ecuador.

The ambassador and his staff work at large in the Embassy of Russia in Quito. The post of Russian ambassador to Ecuador is currently held by Vladimir Sprinchan, incumbent since 10 February 2021.

== History of diplomatic relations ==
Diplomatic relations between Ecuador and the Soviet Union were established on 16 June 1945, though it was not until November 1969 that the opening of embassies was agreed upon. Both countries began to exchange ambassadors from 1970 onwards. With the dissolution of the Soviet Union in 1991, Ecuador recognised the Russian Federation as its successor state.

== List of representatives (1970–present) ==
=== Soviet Union to Ecuador (1970–1991) ===
Name	Title	Appointment	Termination	Notes
Ivan Marchuk	Ambassador	12 May 1970	4 February 1975	Presentation of credentials on 10 June 1970
German Shlyapnikov	Ambassador	4 February 1975	1 March 1980	Presentation of credentials on 26 March 1975
Feliks Kovalyov	Ambassador	1 March 1980	26 August 1986	Presentation of credentials on 1 July 1980
Vadim Chekmazov	Ambassador	26 August 1986	25 December 1991	

=== Russian Federation to Ecuador (1991–present) ===
Name	Title	Appointment	Termination	Notes
Vadim Chekmazov	Ambassador	25 December 1991	14 October 1992	
Mikhail Yemelyanov	Ambassador	14 October 1992	10 July 1998	
Georgy Korolyov	Ambassador	10 July 1998	2 July 2002	
Mikhail Orlovets	Ambassador	2 July 2002	24 June 2004	
Valentin Bogomazov	Ambassador	24 June 2004	21 October 2008	
Yan Burlyay	Ambassador	21 October 2008	13 January 2015	
Andrey Veklenko	Ambassador	13 January 2015	10 February 2021	
Vladimir Sprinchan	Ambassador	10 February 2021		
