= CIA activities in Peru =

Activities by the U.S. Central Intelligence Agency in occupied and post-occupation Japan

The following activities were or are supposed to have been carried out by the Central Intelligence Agency (CIA) in Peru.

== 1962 ==
Following U.S. president Donald Trump's order to declassify a section of the files on the assassination of John F. Kennedy, some files relating to Peru were discovered, revealing that the CIA interfered in the 1962 Peruvian general elections. Other declassified files provide further clues about the CIA's support for the American Popular Revolutionary Alliance (APRA) political party, led by Víctor Raúl Haya de la Torre, who was running as a presidential candidate under his own party. These elections would ultimately be annulled following a coup d'état against Manuel Prado Ugarteche on July 18, 1962, by the Peruvian Armed Forces, with military officer Ricardo Pérez Godoy assuming power.

It is worth adding that the Kennedy administration considered APRA to be the best option for Peru. Other documents that prove CIA support for the APRA party include one written by CIA analyst Sherman Kent, which analyzes Peru in the early 1960s and shows a preference for the APRA party.

== 1963 ==
A NIE addressed the "prospect for an elected civil government" and the problems it would face. The first conclusion was that pressures for change, in a society going through urbanization and industrialization, would take many years to relieve.

Peru is now under a junta that seized power in July 1962, to prevent the Alianza Popular Revolucionaria Americana (APRA), a left populist but anti-Communist party established in 1924. APRA was originally revolutionary but now seeks to participate in the political process. The junta has failed to create a coalition that would be sure to defeat APRA, in the election it committed to have in June 1963.

Since the military can control the outcome, they would do whatever they considered necessary to prevent leftists such as APRA, or Communist groups, taking power. The security apparatus is capable of dealing with anything short of a major uprising or guerilla war.

"In the past, Peruvian Governments have been unwilling to make the sacrifices or to risk the political liabilities of programs aimed at bringing about fundamental social and economic change. Now, however, Peru faces a situation in which political stability is becoming more and more dependent on the ability and disposition of governments to respond effectively to popular demands for economic well-being and security. This situation augurs a breakup of the existing structure of the Peruvian society and economy. Unless the forces of moderation are able to bring about orderly change, radical leadership will probably get the chance to try its method."

== 1997 ==
As early as 1997, the State Department annual human rights report's chapter about Peru described the massive power SIN had acquired under Vladimiro Montesinos, head of the Peruvian National Intelligence Service's (Spanish: Servicio de Inteligencia Nacional or SIN), and its use against domestic political opponents. Despite those concerns, arms sales to the Fujimori regime by the U.S. government and U.S.-licensed companies nearly quadrupled in 1998 to $4.42 million, compared to $1.17 million in 1997.

Also in 1997, the State Department's Bureau of Intelligence and Research alerted the intelligence community to growing concerns about Montesinos, who was very close to President Alberto Fujimori. "But in 1996 Fujimori began a slow decline in popularity as his constituency among the rural and urban poor started to tire of austerity measures that seemed to yield no appreciable benefits. Opposition grew in other sectors as well, questioning such heavy-handed tactics as the Fujimori-controlled congress's constitutional interpretation allowing the president to run for a third term in 2000, the refusal to allow an investigation into narcocorruption charges against powerful national security adviser Valdimiro Montesinos, and a botched kidnapping by intelligence agents of a dissident retired general. These latest incidents conform to a pattern of arrogant, authoritarian behavior evident in Montesinos's large and unexplained income, continuous harassment of opposition figures and journalists, and the grisly murder of an army intelligence agent and the torture of another by their own organization.

== 1998 ==
According to a New York Times report, Jordanian officials asked the CIA station chief in Amman, United States, to object if Jordan sold 50,000 surplus AK-47 assault rifles to the Peruvian military. After checking with embassy diplomatic and military personnel and CIA headquarters, but not with the State Department, the Jordanians were told that the US had no objections to the transaction. Subsequently, however, the CIA told the Clinton Administration that the surplus rifles did not go to Peru but to guerrillas in Colombia. Peru has had a long-standing border dispute with Ecuador, and US sources said that Peruvian arms purchases, due to that conflict, which involved open warfare in 1995, should have been closely monitored. The CIA station in Lima, Peru, had been notified, but the matter was not discussed with Peruvian security officials on the basis of respecting the Jordanian confidence.

On the Peruvian side, the transaction was arranged by Montesinos, working through an arms broker, Sarkis Soghanalian, who said he did not know the guns were going anywhere other than to Peru, and he had received End user certificate (EUC) for them.

The CIA suspected that Montesinos was involved in some illegal activities and was not surprised when informed of the diversion of funds, the U.S. sources said. Even though the agency had its suspicions about Montesinos, it continued doing business with him "because he solved problems, including problems he created himself," one source said. The U.S. Embassy has provided Peru's anti-corruption prosecutor with detailed information about the CIA's payments to Montesinos in response to the Peruvian government's wide-ranging investigations into Montesinos' malfeasance. The prosecutor, Ana Cecilia Magallanes, has told U.S. officials that she has documents showing the diversion of SIN money, including the CIA payments, toward illegal activities. Sources would not elaborate on what those activities included, but the prosecutor said it did not appear that those monies were diverted into Montesinos' personal accounts.

Montesinos had founded and personally controlled a counter-drug unit within SIN. According to U.S. Embassy officials in Lima, interviewed by ICIJ, the SIN's narcotics intelligence unit was funded and assisted by both the CIA and the State Department's Bureau for International Narcotics and Law Enforcement Affairs. The State Department's share included $36,000 in 1996, $150,000 in 1997 and $25,000 in 1998, according to U.S. embassy officials. U.S. officials told ICIJ that the CIA directed at least $10 million in cash payments to the Narcotics Intelligence Division (DIN) from 1990 until September 2000. Most of the money was to finance intelligence activities in the drug war, though officials acknowledged a small part went to antiterrorist activities. The CIA knew the money was going directly to Montesinos and had receipts for the payments, the sources said. "It was an agency-to-agency relationship," one U.S. official in Lima told ICIJ, "with Vladimiro Montesinos as the intermediary... Montesinos had the money under his control."

State Department sources, according to the Times, were unhappy with the CIA role in the matter: "We don't know for sure that he [Montesinos] was involved, but there's a lot of smoke coming from his direction. We do know that we should have had a lot of the information a lot earlier than we got it." Their concern touched on the constant question of how closely US intelligence organizations can work with people accused of human rights violations and other criminal activities. They cited officials, including the Undersecretary of State, Thomas R. Pickering, as being dissatisfied with the flow of information from the agency, both about its own early role in the case and about the possible involvement of Peruvian officials. According to the State personnel, "Every time you asked a question, it would take a few days to get an answer, and every time, their story would change a little. It was like pulling teeth."

CIA personnel, speaking on condition of anonymity, said that while they had been slow to discover the diversion of the rifles, once they were aware of it, they reported it immediately when guns found in the field were traced back to Jordan. They said that they had made regular reports on his alleged illicit actions, while they also worked with him in covert anti-terrorism and counter-drug programs.

Montesinos fled to Panama on September 24, 2000, after the disclosure of a videotape that showed him bribing an opposition legislator. The Times article said that while the US and the Organization of American States (OAS) had urged Panama to grant him asylum, Panama refused, and Montesinos flew back to hide in Peru on October 23, 2000.

Switzerland informed Peru of five bank accounts, containing US$50 million, belonging to Montesinos, and Peru said they would try to prosecute him for corruption. The scope of his arms trading was apparently unknown to the CIA. CIA personnel said that there was no reason to suspect the Jordanian offer, which was of the flavor of "Would it upset our relationship with you if we sold these weapons to the Peruvian government?" The officials said the Jordanians were under no obligation to obtain US permission.

Soghanalian, who was awaiting unrelated criminal charges in Los Angeles, said the Peruvians sought from the start to establish a discreet relationship they might use to buy more sophisticated weapons. He had been introduced to Montesinos, who was introduced to him as "the boss."

Peruvian officials presented Soghanalian with "a shopping list of more than $70 million worth of hardware that he thought could have been meant only for a regular army: antiaircraft weapons, communications gear, and equipment to upgrade tanks. The broker said there were some strange aspects to the arrangement: The Peruvians asked to pay for the future purchases in cash and offered him $22 million as a down payment. They insisted on air-dropping the AK-47s to their troops. The first of the cargoes was also turned back in the Amazon basin for reasons that were never clear, and the shipments were finally aborted in August 1999 after 9,540 of the rifles had been sent...he did not think much of the fact that the Peruvians also wanted to buy a large quantity of Russian SA-7 Strella missiles, a shoulder-fired weapon that would immediately change the balance of power in Colombia if obtained by the insurgents."

According to the Times, Many military analysts have expected the Colombian guerrillas to search for arms purchases to counter a $1.3 billion package of American aid that includes almost $400 million for new helicopters for the Colombian security forces. "The retired Peruvian Army lieutenant who arranged for the Jordanian shipment with Soghanalian, Jose Luis Aybar, has also identified Mr. Montesinos as the official who oversaw the arms deal. But Mr. Aybar said he was unaware that the Jordanian cargo consisted of assault rifles, a claim that Mr. Soghanalian and others contradicted."

== 1999 ==
See Colombia 1999 for the CIA's action after some rifles were seized in mid-1999. The report of the arms transfer led to an August 21, 1999 press conference at which Fujimori and Montesinos took credit for detecting an arms smuggling ring. CIA personnel said that the statements of Soghanalian and Aybar did not confirm Montesinos was involved in the diversion to Colombia. "We don't have any illusions about his [Montesinos'] background...We do not have intelligence information -- other than the statements of a couple of individuals -- that ties him to it."

In 1999, State withheld aid to the SIN because of congressional anger about reports that Montesinos was using the unit to conduct intelligence against the regime's political opponents.

== 2000 ==
According to the Center for Public Integrity, Soghanalian in 2000, cooperated in the investigation of questionable practices under Fujimori and Montesinos. The Peruvian prosecutor, José Carlos Ugaz, who is investigating wrongdoings by the Fujimori regime said "What Sarkis Soghanalian knew is fundamental to demonstrate that Montesinos controlled arms purchases during the Fujimori administration, at least since the conflict with Ecuador in 1995," Ugaz told the International Consortium of Investigative Journalists (ICIJ). ICIJ is the investigative arm of the Center for Public Integrity.

Gen. Julio Salazar Monroe, Rozas' predecessor at SIN from 1991 to 1998, and the last head of SIN, Rear Adm. Humberto Rozas Bonuccelli, both said, according to the Center for Public Integrity, "they ran the National Intelligence Service in name only and that Montesinos was its de facto chief." Montesinos had Fujimori's authority to manage his own state funds and personnel without any oversight, Rozas said. "Montesinos had a very independent way of working and it was compartmentalized. He had his own private revenues... had a group of people that worked exclusively for him, even though no one knew how many they were or who they were."

Rozas said he discovered Montesinos' role in the arms sale to the FARC with the help of unspecified "American" intelligence agents, who provided him with photocopies of documents concerning the transaction. The Americans, Rozas said in court testimony, "wanted an investigation to be carried out to determine if the Peruvian army had bought these arms." U.S. Embassy officials told ICIJ that it was the CIA that provided documents about the arms deal to Rozas.

Rozas first met with CIA personnel, with respect to the arms sale, on Aug. 10, 2000. Eleven days later, after he had begun an investigation, Fujimori and Montesinos announced they had uncovered arms smuggling on August 21, declaring "that a serious blow against an arms trafficking ring had taken place, 'in which not one Peruvian intelligence agent is compromised' The Organization of American States was pressuring Peru to restructure and reform the duties of the SIN at the time, which may be why Fujimori attributed the 'notable success' of the operation to the SIN and Montesinos. 'After they received the documents, they rushed to publicize the case. This was a political decision,' testified Rozas. The Peruvian judge hearing the case asked Rozas, 'What would have happened if the documents from the American intelligence agents had not been delivered to you but instead only to Vladimiro Montesinos? Would the arms trafficking have been uncovered?' The ex-SIN head replied, 'Most likely, no.'"

"Angered by cuts in U.S. aid ordered by Congress in response to reports of abuses by the SIN, Fujimori called the sting operation "Plan Siberia" and said it was much smaller, yet more effective, than Washington's $1.3 billion Plan Colombia.

== 2001 ==
In 2001, while the CIA was assisting the Peruvian Air Force in the war on drugs, the CIA incorrectly assessed that a small plane was involved in the drug trade, leading to the death of a U.S. Christian missionary, Roni Bowers, and her daughter. The U.S. Government paid compensation of $8 million to the Bowers family and the pilot.

== 2004 ==
Montesinos' first of 60 trials started in 2004. His defense, according to BBC correspondent Hannah Hennessy, he is already serving nine years in a high-security naval base near Lima after being convicted for lesser offenses and has yet to face other charges, including alleged involvement in death squad killings. Hennessy called him "the right-hand man of former President Alberto Fujimori; Montesinos effectively ran Peru from the shadows throughout the 1990s."

== See also ==
- Soviet espionage in Peru
