= Deng Xiaoping's dogs =

Animal abuse incident in Peru perpetrated by Shining Path

- A policeman unties one dog that appeared hanged and beaten in the streets of Lima on the morning.
- Native name: Los perros de Teng Siao Ping
- Location: Lima, Peru
- Date: December 26, 1980
- Attack type: Communist terrorism
- Deaths: 7 dogs
- Perpetrator: Shining Path sympathisers
- Motive: Opposition to the reform and opening up

Deng Xiaoping's dogs (Spanish: Los perros de Teng Siao Ping) is a term used by modern Peruvian historiography to refer to a case of animal abuse perpetrated in Lima by Shining Path, a Maoist terror group, in response to Chinese leader Deng Xiaoping's unorthodox reform and opening up, distancing himself from the thoughts of Mao Zedong, founder of the People's Republic of China.

On the morning of December 26, 1980, several stray dogs were discovered by locals, hanging on lampposts located in important avenues of the city's central area. The dogs, hung by their necks, also had pieces of paper tied to them with phrases such as "Deng Xiaoping son of a bitch" (Spanish: Teng Siao Ping hijo de perra).

== Background ==
=== Shining Path's relationship with Chinese communism ===
The founder of Shining Path, Abimael Guzmán, was a fervent supporter of Mao Zedong, he even traveled twice to the fledgling People's Republic of China to learn about Maoism and see the development of the Cultural Revolution. Guzmán himself considered the doctrine of his movement, Gonzalo thought, as the fourth ideological line that would accompany Marxism–Leninism-Maoism.

After Mao's death, the new administration of Deng Xiaoping branded the result of Maoist policies as failures, although Deng was still a communist, he took opposite positions towards the classic policies in the country, in the face of the Great Chinese Famine and the power struggle. Guzmán took China's turnaround personally, blaming the Chinese reformer as a traitor to Mao, as a "capitalist road follower" and as a "dog."

=== Senderista preparations for Lima ===
At the same time, the Shining Path was still not taken seriously by the Lima authorities, despite the fact that, according to the Center for Development Studies and Promotion (DESCO), by the end of 1980 it had already committed 219 terrorist attacks throughout the country.

== Events ==
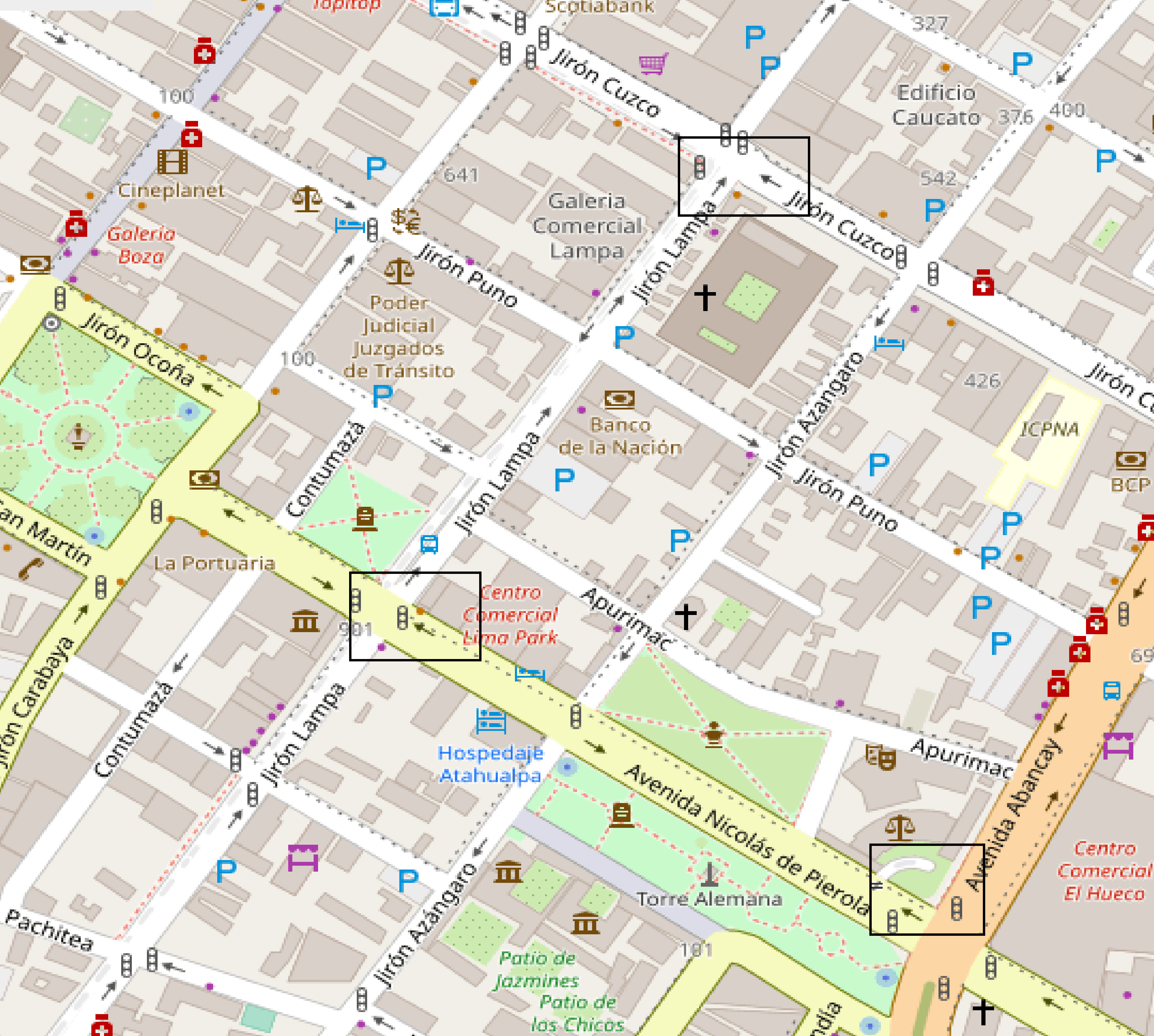
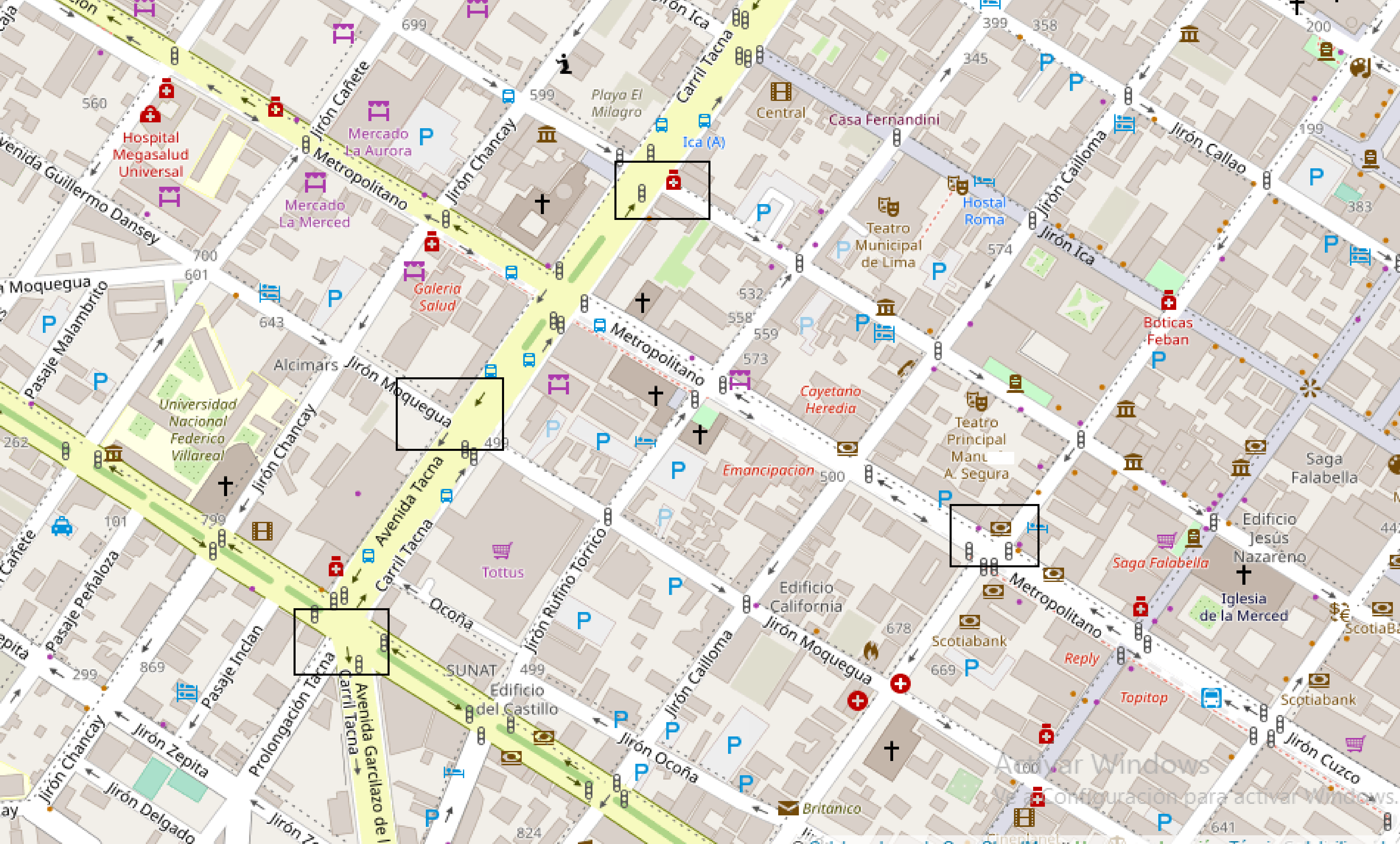
Sites where the dogs were found.

The first dog seen was at six in the morning, after Christmas, at the intersection of Tacna and Nicolás de Piérola avenues, with a sign that warned of having a bomb in the animal's corpse. Members of the Civil Guard Emergency Squad removed the dead animal and found that the bomb threat was false. Squadron chief Armando Mellet reported that the animal had been beaten, strangled and also had a plastic tube forced into its mouth. Subsequently, another seven calls were recorded where they removed other hanging dogs, a total of one for each place.

Places where hanging dogs were found
Intersection of Tacna Avenue with Nicolás de Piérola, near the Tacna-Colmena Building.
Crossing of Jirón Moquegua with Tacna Avenue, in this corpse the first writing with the name "Teng Siao Ping" was found.
Tacna Avenue No. 413, in front of the Sanctuary and Monastery of Las Nazarenas; on this corpse the writing "Teng Siao Ping son of a bitch" was found.
Emancipación Avenue with Jirón Camaná, in front of the current headquarters of the Ministry of Women and Vulnerable Populations and near the Jirón de la Unión station of the Metropolitano. This is the only point for which there is no photographic record.
Jirón Lampa and Jirón Cuzco.
Jiron Lampa and Nicolás de Piérola Avenue, in front of the Bank of the Nation Building.
Abancay Avenue with Nicolás de Piérola, in front of the Javier Alzamora Valdez Building.

For the police authorities those responsible were some unspecified communist group. Years later, Sendero Luminoso recognized his authorship. According to Carlos Tapia, a former member of the Truth and Reconciliation Commission, Abimael had given the order directly:

That is why Abimael Guzmán ordered those dogs to be hanged. It was like a message that he wanted to give so that the world would know that in Peru there was a group of communists, Maoists, and above all followers of the Cultural Revolution who hated "Teng Siao Ping's dog."

In addition, the chosen date, December 26, was also the date of Mao Zedong's birth. The killing of dogs in the framework of the internal armed conflict is the largest massacre against dogs that occurred in Peru. In total, Shining Path, according to journalist César Hildebrandt, killed more than 2 million animals "only in Junín, Ayacucho, Huancavelica and Puno" such as cattle, alpacas and sheep between the 1980s and 2000s.

== See also ==
- 1987 North Korean embassy attack in Lima
- 1986 Soviet embassy attack in Lima
