= List of ambassadors of Russia to Peru =

Ambassador of the Russian Federation to the Republic of Peru
- Emblem of the Russian Foreign Ministry
- Ministry of Foreign Affairs; Embassy of Russia in Lima
- Style: His Excellency; The Honourable
- Reports to: Minister of Foreign Affairs
- Seat: Lima
- Appointer: President of Russia
- Term length: At the pleasure of the president
- Website: Embassy of Russia in Peru

The ambassador extraordinary and plenipotentiary of the Russian Federation to the Republic of Peru is the official representative of the president and the government of the Russian Federation to the president and the government of Peru.

The ambassador and his staff work at large in the Embassy of Russia in Lima. The post of Russian ambassador to Peru is currently held by Igor Romanchenko, incumbent since 18 June 2018.

== History of diplomatic relations ==
Diplomatic relations between Peru and Russia date back to the 19th century. Emperor Alexander II sent a letter, dated 29 October 1862, to Miguel de San Román, president of Peru, congratulating him on his election and expressing his desire to maintain friendly relations between the Russian Empire and Peru. The two countries signed their first official document, a Trade and Navigation Agreement in 1874, and by 1909 Peru had six consular missions in the Russian Empire: in Saint Petersburg, Moscow, Riga, Warsaw, Odessa and Kherson.

Relations at the embassy level between the Soviet Union and Peru were established on 1 February 1969. Relations were strengthened after the 1970 Ancash earthquake, with the Soviet Union sending helicopters and medical aid. During the internal conflict in Peru, the embassy was targeted by terror group Shining Path, being bombed on at least one occasion. With the dissolution of the Soviet Union in 1991, Peru recognised the Russian Federation as its successor state on 26 December 1991.

== List of representatives ==
=== Soviet Union to Peru (1969–1991) ===
Name	Title	Appointment	Termination	Notes
Yury Lebedev	Ambassador	5 March 1969	28 February 1975	Presentation of credentials on 20 June 1969
Leonid Kuzmin	Ambassador	28 February 1975	29 April 1983	Presentation of credentials on 10 April 1975
Anatoly Filatov	Ambassador	29 April 1983	17 August 1991	
Viktor Tkachenko	Ambassador	17 August 1991	25 December 1991	

=== Russian Federation to Peru (1991–2026) ===
Name	Title	Appointment	Termination	Notes
Viktor Tkachenko	Ambassador	25 December 1991	3 February 1997	
Valentin Bogomazov	Ambassador	3 February 1997	11 October 2001	
Anatoly Kuznetsov	Ambassador	11 October 2001	31 January 2006	
Mikhail Troyansky	Ambassador	31 January 2006	15 February 2011	
Nikolai Sofinsky	Ambassador	15 February 2011	19 January 2015	
Andrey Guskov	Ambassador	19 January 2015	18 June 2018	
Igor Romanchenko	Ambassador	18 June 2018	28 July 2026	

== See also ==
- List of ambassadors of Peru to Russia
