= Soviet espionage in Peru =

Espionage against Peru by Soviet intelligence agencies

The following activities were or are supposed to have been carried out by the Committee for State Security (KGB) in Peru.

== Government of Juan Velasco Alvarado ==
Following the 1968 coup d'état, Nikolai Leonov was sent to Lima to investigate the new regime, staying in a hotel under the cover of a correspondent from RIA Novosti. While in Lima, he made contact with some members of the regime; although the CIA alerted its local contacts of his presence, which led to him being threatened by telephone and a photographer following him. While in Lima, he had difficulties communicating with the KGB to send his reports, which meant that, on one occasion in early 1969, he had to travel to Chile to send an encrypted telegram from the KGB residence there.

In August 1969, after the establishment of diplomatic relations between the USSR and Peru in February of the same year, a KGB residence directed by Arseni Fyodorovich Orlov was established in Lima.

Through the residence, the KGB established contact with various members of the regime who became "confidential contacts", among them the "most trusted confidant" of Juan Velasco Alvarado. In addition, contact was established with Velasco through another member of the regime and one of his advisors was recruited as a KGB agent. This advisor was paid US$5,000, according to a 1971 report, and through him the KGB exerted influence on Velasco and other members of government, while public opinion was formed through him, as he owned two government newspapers.

=== KGB–SIN relations ===
In addition to establishing contact with members of the regime, the KGB proposed cooperation with the National Intelligence Service (SIN). For this purpose, the SIN was assigned the code name KONTORA and negotiations were established between the SIN and the KGB, from which a draft agreement was produced where the exchange of intelligence, cooperation between both agencies, the training by the KGB of SIN members and the provision to the SIN of a KGB "operational technical team." In June 1971, the Central Committee of the Communist Party of the Soviet Union approved the agreement. As part of the agreement, two operations officers and a technical specialist arrived in Lima to serve as liaison with the SIN. On the other hand, the SIN stopped monitoring the KGB. Meetings between KGB and SIN officers took place once a week in SIN apartments.

One of the first operations between both agencies was the establishment, by the SIN and with the support of the KGB, of a surveillance post near the U.S. embassy. In addition to taking photographs and recording activities at the embassy in files, the SIN received equipment from the KGB to record telephone calls and intercept radio messages. These operations allowed "the neutralisation of a network of US agents in the [Peruvian] unions and the liquidation of a technical operational group of US intelligence." From the operations between both agencies, various officials related to the CIA were expelled and the English courses sponsored by the US were reduced, in addition to the activities of the Peace Corps.

In 1973, General Enrique Gallegos Venero, leader of the SIN, visited Moscow, where he spoke with Yuri Andropov and senior KGB officials. At this meeting, it was agreed to expand the scope of intelligence cooperation to include Peruvian military intelligence, which was designated with the code name SHTAB.

Initially, KGB officers noted "cautious" treatment of them by SIN members. Despite this, the KGB managed to convince them through intelligence articles, gifts, "material aid" and invitations to the USSR. The KGB subsequently criticised the behaviour of SIN officers who were invited to Moscow. According to a KGB report, "the Peruvians who studied in the special departments [...] dedicated themselves to establishing contact with girls and women of relaxed behavior in Moscow, and maintaining intimate relations with them, after which they were handed over to another group of students to maintain intimate relationships. The students did not pay attention to the course supervisors' attempts to enlighten them."

=== Relations with Peruvian communists ===
Orlov reported to the KGB that the government was adopting a "progressive and anti-imperialist line" with the support of the Communist Party, which was allowed to operate openly and publish its newspaper.

Due to the Sino-Soviet split, the KGB carried out operations against the Maoists, including those in Peru. As part of these operations, in June 1975, the KGB established contact with a leader of the Marxist–Leninist Party, who operated under the code name VANTAN. Through VANTAN, the KGB disrupted the party congress in 1976 where VANTAN "harshly criticized Beijing's policy, including its dividing line of the communist and labour movement, and decided to break with Maoism and dissolve."

== Government of Francisco Morales Bermúdez ==
After the 1975 coup d'état, during which Velasco was overthrown by Francisco Morales Bermúdez, the KGB gave, with Andropov's approval, a Makarov pistol and 200 cartridges to Morales Bermúdez. By December of that year, the KGB sent the SIN equipment valued at $300,000. By 1976, the KGB gave the SIN leader and other Peruvian intelligence officials Makarov pistols and gifts valued between 150 and 300 rubles. In addition, ten SIN officers were trained in Moscow.

== Later history ==
In 1986, a KGB agent codenamed KORAL issued a report on an operation in the Peruvian port of Callao.

== See also ==
- Active measures
- Revolutionary Government of the Armed Forces of Peru
- CIA activities in Peru
