= 2013 siege of the Pakistani embassy in Dhaka =

Incident at the Pakistani High Commission in Dhaka

The siege of the Pakistan High Commission in Dhaka took place when hundreds of protesters gathered outside the Pakistan High Commission building in Dhaka's Gulshan diplomatic enclave after breaking through barbed wire barricades.

== The situation ==
The incident took place when Pakistan Parliament passed a resolution condemning the execution of Bangladesh Jamaat-e-Islami's secretary-general Abdul Qadir Molla who was hanged on 12 December 2013. Ultimately, Bangladesh summoned Pakistan's High Commissioner in Dhaka to lodge its protest over the resolution adopted by the National Assembly of Pakistan expressing concern over the execution of Abdul Quader Molla.

Tension arose when many political activists called for "cutting off its diplomatic ties with Pakistan and issued ultimatum for laying the siege of the high commission building. At 3:00 pm, the protestors moved marched towards the High Commission protesting against Pakistan and the marchers congregated there chanting anti-Pakistan slogans. A shoe was thrown by a protester who along with 50-60 protesters rushed to the high commission gate, chanting slogan "Joy Bangla" (Victory to Bengal). At the Chittagong University, the protesters set fire to Pakistan's flag; similar incidents took place in all over the country.

Meanwhile, Pakistan condemned the storming of Pakistan's High Commission in Dhaka and the incidents of burning the flag of Pakistan by Bangladeshi protesters. The Foreign Office released the official statement, quoting that "Bangladesh is Pakistan's neighbouring Islamic country and Pakistan wants to strengthen ties with it." Following the incidence, the security was tightened in and around the High Commission of Pakistan in Dhaka.
