= Valentin Bogomazov =

Russian diplomat (1943–2019)

- Валентин Богомазов

Ambassador of Russia to Ecuador
- In office 24 June 2004 – 21 October 2008
- Preceded by: Mikhail Orlovets
- Succeeded by: Yan Burlyay

Ambassador of Russia to Peru
- In office 3 February 1997 – 11 October 2001
- Preceded by: Viktor Tkachenko
- Succeeded by: Anatoly Kuznetsov

Personal details
- Born: Valentin Mikhailovich Bogomazov; 30 September 1943 Kuybyshev, Kuybyshev Oblast, RSFSR, Soviet Union
- Died: 29 December 2019 (aged 76)
- Education: Moscow State Institute of International Relations

Valentin Mikhailovich Bogomazov (Russian: Валентин Михайлович Богомазов, 30 September 1943 – 29 December 2019) was a Russian diplomat. He served as a member of diplomatic staff and as ambassador to Peru and Ecuador from the 1960s and into the 2000s.

== Early life and European postings ==
Bogomazov was born on 30 September 1943 in Kuybyshev, now the city of Samara, in Kuybyshev Oblast, then part of the RSFSR, in the Soviet Union. Recruited for work in USSR's Ministry of Foreign Affairs in 1963, he studied at Moscow State Institute of International Relations in preparation for a career in the Ministry, graduating in 1966. He was almost immediately assigned to work overseas, beginning at the Embassy of the USSR in Italy that year. He eventually spent fifteen years at the USSR's Italian embassy, between 1966 and 1971, and between 1974 and 1984. In 1984 he was appointed head of the 1st European Department at the Foreign Ministry, and in 1985 became Advisor and Envoy to the Embassy in Italy, while simultaneously serving as Consul General to the Republic of San Marino. He held these posts until 1989, when he became Deputy Permanent Representative of the USSR, and after 1991, the Russian Federation, to the European Communities in Brussels. This was followed by his appointment in 1993 to serve as Deputy Head of the European Department, and a Deputy Director of the Ministry of Foreign Affairs. He was granted the diplomatic rank of Extraordinary and Plenipotentiary Envoy 1st class on 11 December 1996.

== Ambassadorships and later life ==
Bogomazov's next posting was his appointment on 3 February 1997 to be the Ambassador of Russia to Peru. He was advanced to the rank of Ambassador Extraordinary and Plenipotentiary on 13 April 1999. He was the ambassador until his replacement on 11 October 2001, at which point he was appointed Ambassador on Special Assignments, and Chairman of the Border Delimitation Commission with Latvia and Estonia. In 2004 Bogomazov returned to South America as an ambassador, with his appointment on 24 June that year to serve as Ambassador of Russia to Ecuador. He held this post until 21 October 2008, and retired later that year.

In retirement Bogomazov studied as a candidate of political sciences at Moscow State Institute of International Relations, submitting his thesis on the topic "The political and social development of Latin America in the context of globalization and the role of the church: Based on the concept of "theology of liberation"" in 2012. Bogomazov died on 29 December 2019 at the age of 76. The Russian Ministry of Foreign Affairs announced that he was "a true professional in his field, a man with a diverse and wide range of knowledge, a sympathetic colleague and mentor, a patriot who for many years defended the interests of our Fatherland." In addition to his native Russian, he spoke Spanish, English and Italian.
