= Embassy of Russia, Lima =

Russian diplomatic mission to Peru

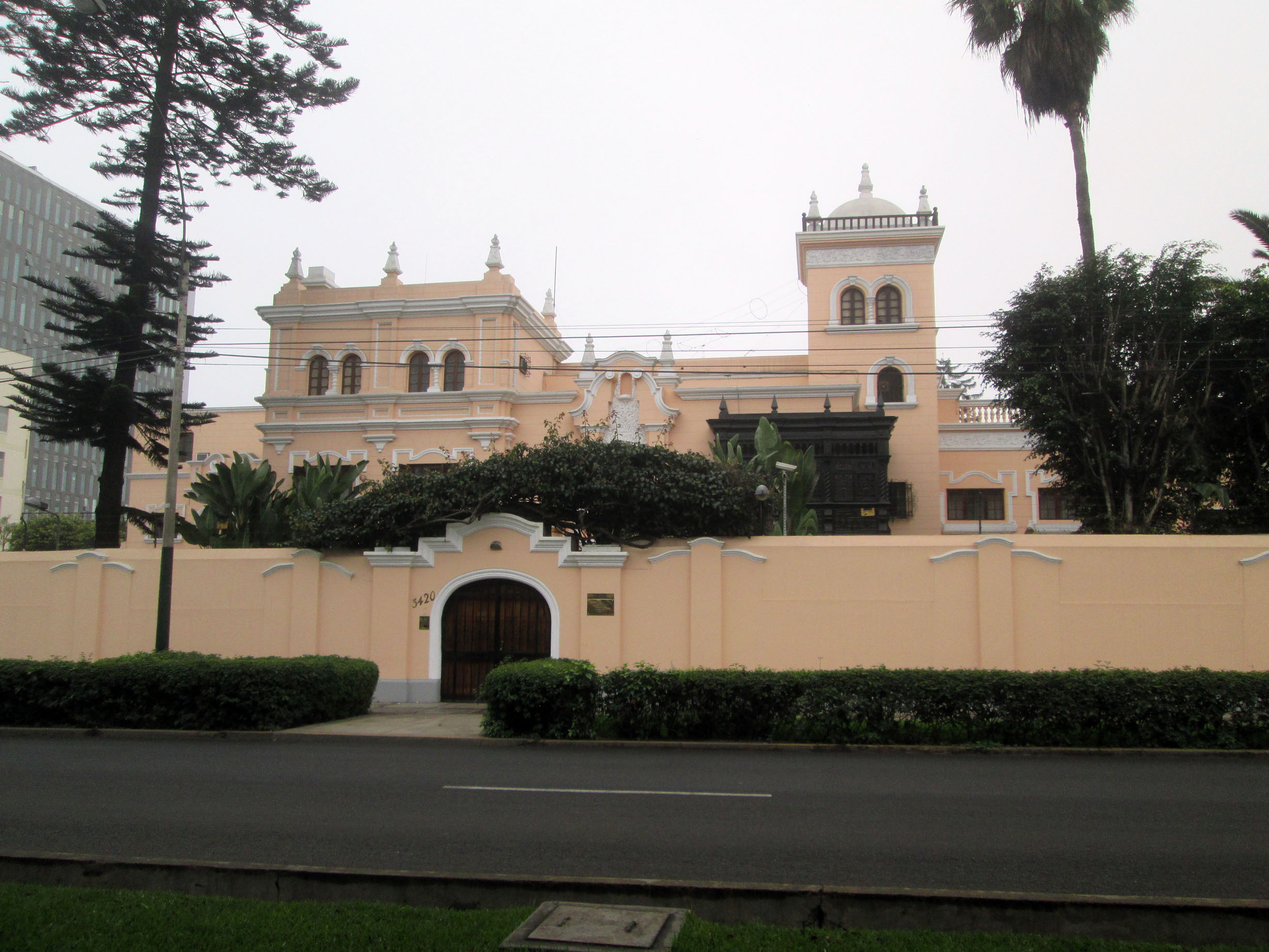
- The embassy in 2013
- Location: San Isidro District, Lima, Peru
- Address: Av. Salaverry 3424
- Opening: c. 1970
- Website: Official website

The Embassy of the Russian Federation in Lima is the official diplomatic mission of Russia to the Republic of Peru. It served as the embassy of the Soviet Union from its inauguration until the country's dissolution in 1991.

== History ==
=== Background ===
Peru and the Russian Empire first established bilateral relations on May 16, 1874. Said relations were handled by the Peruvian Minister Plenipotentiary, based in the legation in Saint Petersburg and also accredited to Germany. With the execution of the Romanov family and the downfall of the Russian Republic as a result of the Russian Civil War, both countries ceased to have any diplomatic relations in 1918.

=== Soviet Embassy (1970–1991) ===
After the establishment of the United Nations and the establishment of a Peruvian seat of honor in 1942, then president Manuel Prado Ugarteche personally refused to host a Soviet diplomatic mission in Lima, also refusing to send an ambassador to the Soviet Union. Only after the coup that deposed Fernando Belaúnde and allowed Juan Velasco Alvarado to establish his so-called revolutionary government were relations reestablished at an embassy level in 1969, alongside other socialist countries.

With relations reestablished, the Soviet government bought a manor in Orrantia Del Mar, a borough of the upper-class San Isidro district that originally belonged to Anita Fernandini de Naranjo and would eventually become the embassy in 1970.

In 1975, after Alvarado announced the Plan Inca, a rationing plan in line with the government's attempts at implementing socialist policies, a unique type of protests took place outside of the embassy, as several cars with covered license plates drove by the building, with their occupants hurling rocks at the embassy and driving away.

With the internal conflict between the Peruvian government and leftist guerrillas beginning in 1980, both the Soviet Embassy and Soviet citizens became targets of these terror groups. Because Soviet–Peruvian relations had strengthened after Mikhail Gorbachev's rise to power, guerrillas such as the Shining Path attacked the embassy several times due to the former's support of the latter against the group. In 1985, the embassy was bombed alongside the Chinese and U.S. embassies, and the following year, Shining Path terrorists almost bombed the building from the inside. The embassy was again bombed in October 1989, being preceded by a car bomb attack that targeted Soviet sailors in Callao.

=== Russian Embassy (1991–present) ===
With the dissolution of the Soviet Union in 1991, Peru recognised the Russian Federation as its successor state on 26 December 1991, with the embassy now representing the new Russian state.

In February 2022, after the Russian invasion of Ukraine, protests were held in front of the embassy by both locals and Ukrainian residents in Lima.

== Cultural Centre ==
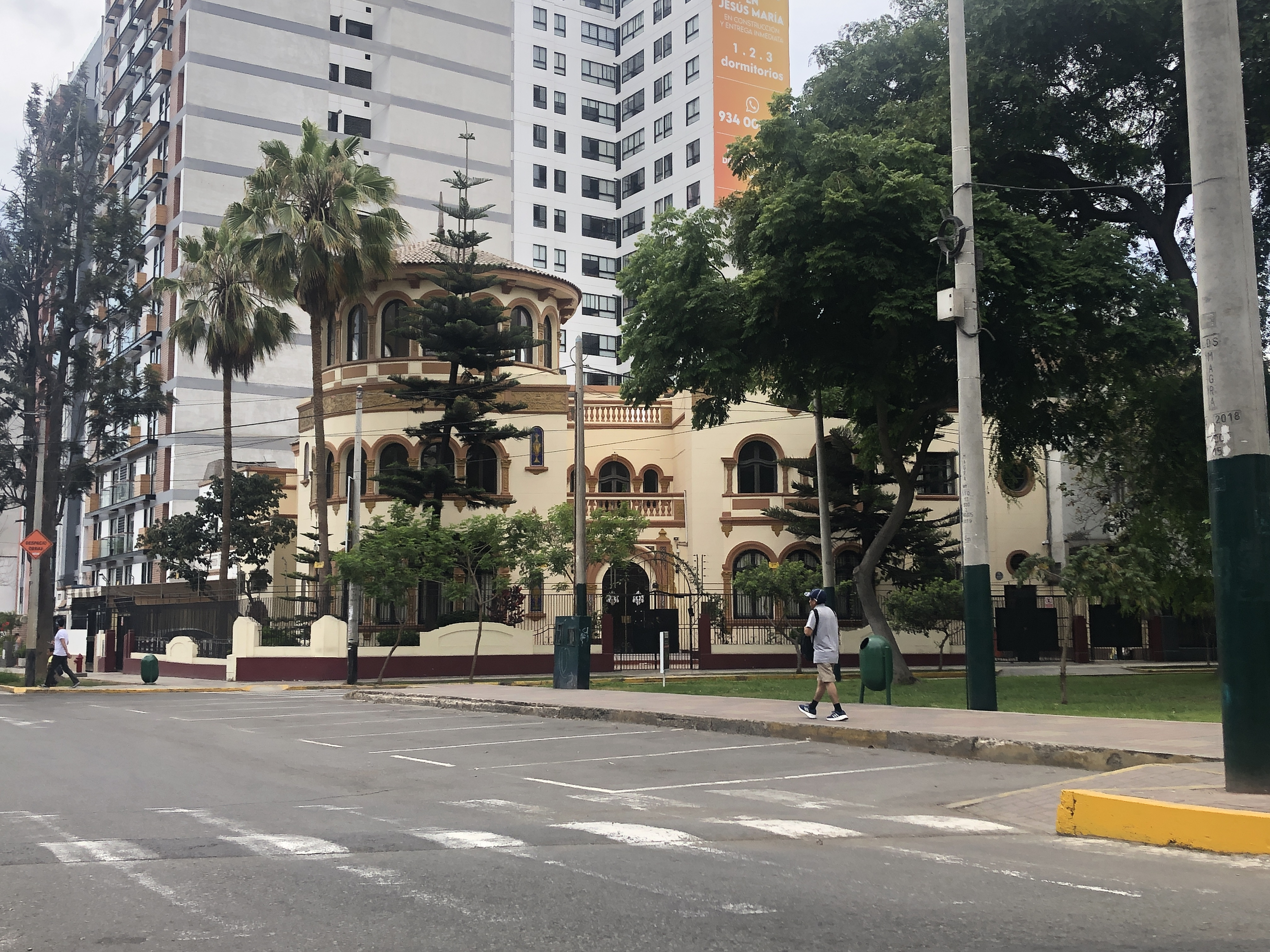
The Casa Rusa.

The Russian–Peruvian Cultural Centre (Spanish: Asociación Cultural Peruano Rusa), formerly the Soviet–Peruvian Cultural Centre (Spanish: Asociación Cultural Peruano Soviética) until 1991, is the embassy's cultural centre, located at the Casa Rusa, located at the intersection of General Santa Cruz Avenue and Jirón Mayta Cápac, which runs parallel to Salaverry Avenue.

It operates under the Rossotrudnichestvo agency, having originally operated under the SSOD of the Soviet Union.

== See also ==
- Peru–Russia relations
- List of ambassadors of Russia to Peru
- List of ambassadors of Peru to Russia
- Embassy of the United States, Lima
- Embassy of China, Lima
- Casa Fernandini, Santa María del Mar, also owned by Fernandini de Naranjo.
