= 1986 Soviet embassy attack in Lima =

Terrorist attack in Lima, Peru

1986 Soviet embassy attack
- Part of the Internal conflict in Peru
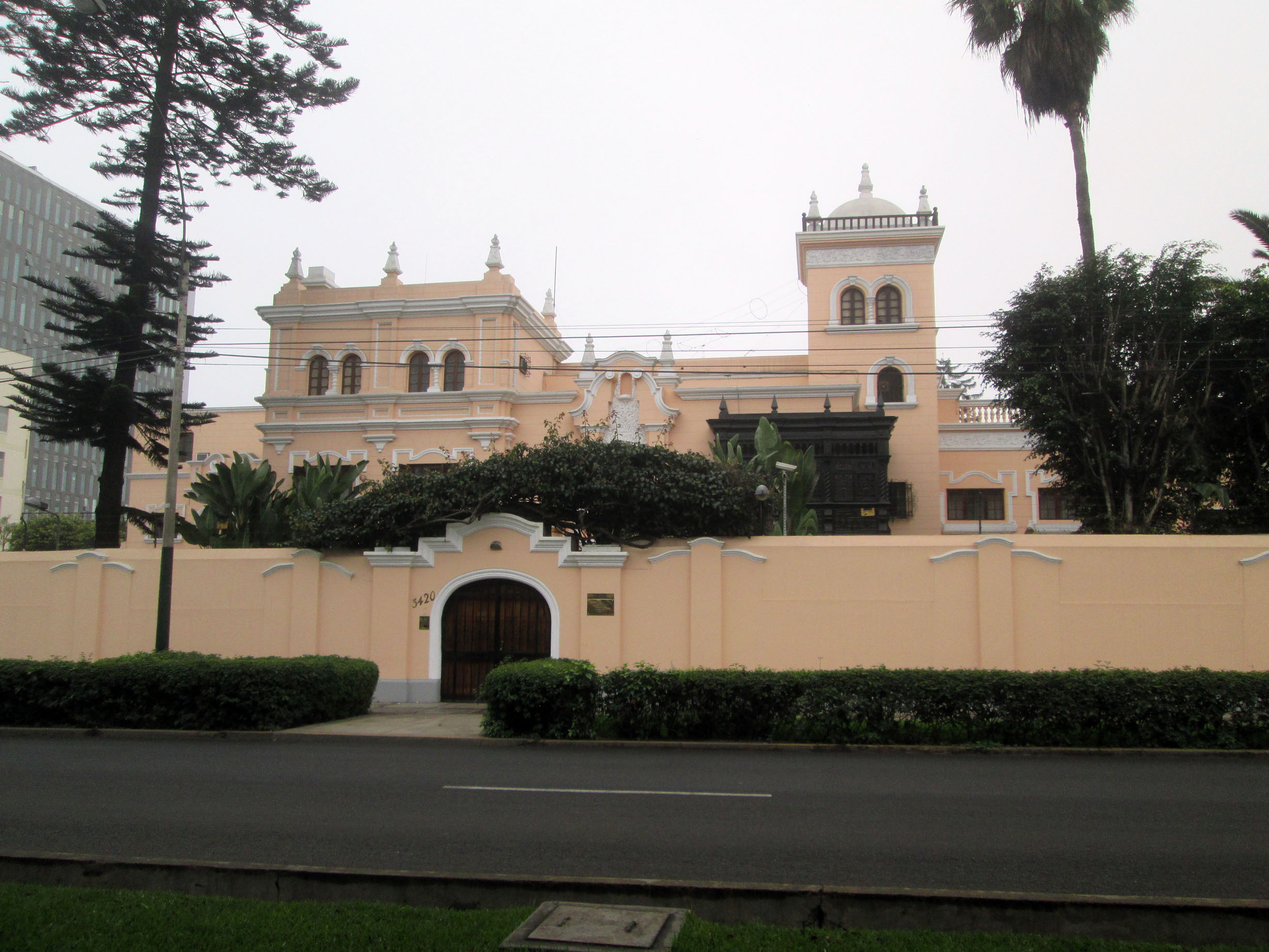
- The Russian Embassy in 2013
- Location: San Isidro, Lima, Peru
- Date: July 7, 1986 (EDT)
- Target: Soviet Embassy, Lima
- Attack type: Shooting; Bombing
- Deaths: 1 (one perpetrator)
- Injuries: 0
- Perpetrator: Shining Path (alleged)

The 1986 Soviet embassy attack in Lima was a terrorist attack on July 7, 1986, against the official residence of the delegation of the Soviet Union in Peru. The attack failed to result in the death of any Soviet citizen, killing one terrorist.

== Background ==
After Peru's socialist government and the Soviet Union established relations in 1969, the latter opened an embassy in the district of San Isidro.

The terrorist group Sendero Luminoso had already carried out incidents outside the Soviet embassy for years, mainly due to ideological discrepancies in the left spectrum. One such example happened the year prior, as the Soviet, American and Chinese embassies were attacked in a similar manner.

== Attack ==
The attack began with a series of shootings outside the Soviet embassy in Lima. Among the chaos caused by the initial attack, one of the shooters managed to enter the interior of the Soviet residence where he tried to explode a bomb that he was carrying with him, the explosion of the attack failed to cause deaths beyond the suicide bomber himself.

The attackers who survived and saw that their plan failed, fled to the outskirts of the embassy, in one of the suburbs near the residence, two policewomen captured the attackers after an exchange of gunfire.

== Aftermath ==
The terrorist group Sendero Luminoso was accused of being responsible for the attack, or alternatively, a group of sympathizers. Shining Path's official position on the USSR was known to be negative, stating that the socialist state was an "enemy" of its cause of struggle.

The Soviet Foreign Ministry paid a visit to Peru, represented by Vice Minister Viktor Komplektov, who in turn represented the government of Mikhail Gorbachev, and reported that the then Peruvian President Alan García received Soviet support in his war against Shining Path.

This would not be the last attack against Soviet interests or citizens in Peru. Two months later, on September 1, six Soviet fishermen on leave, who fished in Peruvian waters as part of interstate fishing agreements, were injured by a bomb at a Callao market, with one of the sailors losing both arms, legs and eyes. Almost three years later, in June 1989, a bombing attributed to SL against a bus carrying 49 Soviet fishermen while they were shopping on leave injured 33 of them.

== See also ==
- 1987 North Korean embassy attack in Lima
- 1989 Callao bombing
- Japanese embassy hostage crisis
- Deng Xiaoping's dogs
