= May 24 incident =

1957 anti-US protests in Taiwan

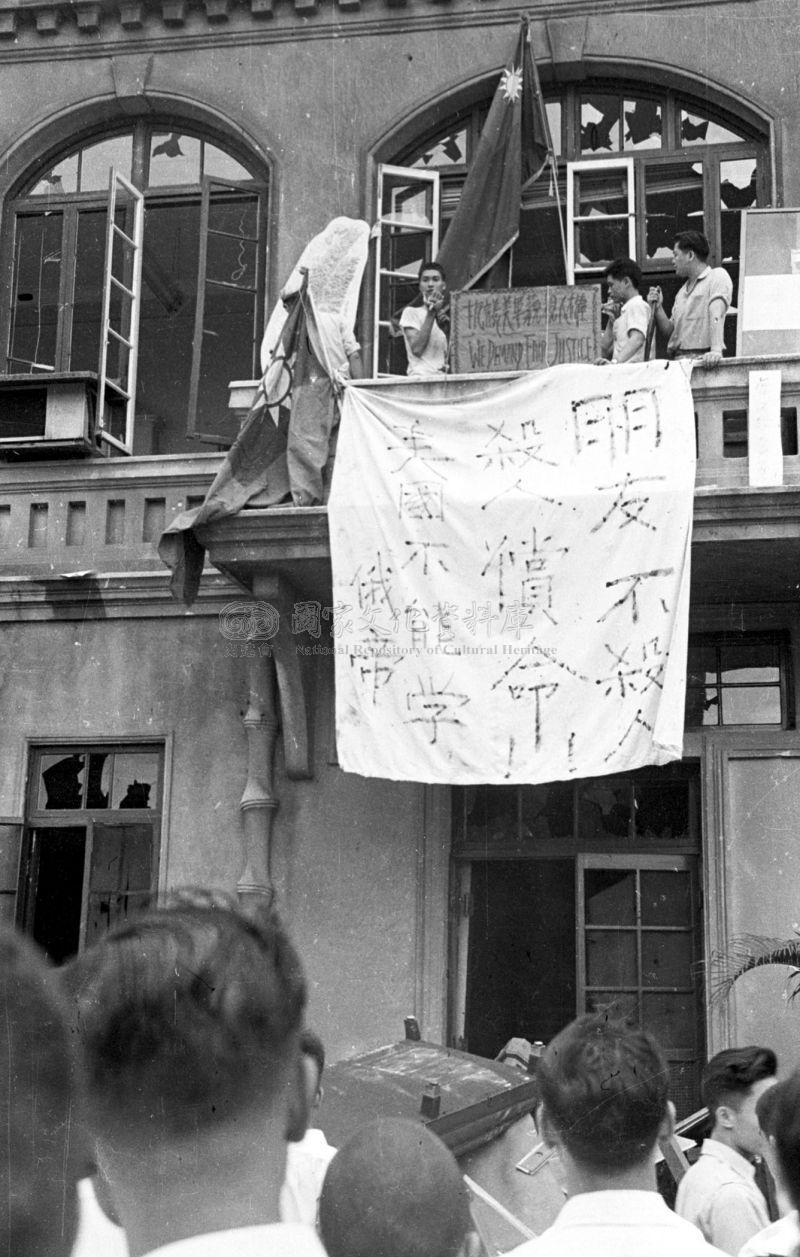
Crowds gathered and attacked the U.S. embassy on May 24. The label reads, "Friends shall not kill (to their friends)! A murderer shall pay with his life! The United States shall not learn from Soviet imperialism."

The May 24 incident (Chinese: 五二四事件), also called the Liu Ziran incident (劉自然事件) and the Reynolds riot, was a 1957 international incident between the United States and Taiwan (ROC) that started over the killing of an ROC national by an American military officer and the subsequent acquitted court-martial conducted by U.S. military personnel in Taiwan, resulting in protests that culminated in separate mob attacks on the then-U.S. Embassy, the United States Information Service buildings and a police station in Taipei.

There were other acts of protests prior to, during and after May 24, 1957, across Taiwan and in Taipei that led U.S. government officials behind-the-scenes to refer to these events as "riots" but U.S. officials deliberately spoke of a "riot" to avoid any adverse psychological impact on its alliance with the ROC. Similarly, the May 24 incident was seen then and later as an "anti-American" protest, although Chiang Kai-shek, president of the ROC, publicly referred to the events of May 24 as an "unfortunate incident" (不幸事變).

== Background ==
In 1951, the U.S. government agreed to establish a Military Advisory and Assistance Group-Taiwan. By January 1957, there were over 10,000 Americans living on Taiwan of which 61% were composed of MAAG advisers and their dependents. The U.S. government insisted that all of its civilian and military personnel including their dependents possess diplomatic immunity with the result that approximately 1,000 Americans were subject to ROC law. Starting in 1955, the ROC and U.S. governments engaged in negotiations to establish a Status of Forces Agreement but talks failed because the ROC demanded the right to try U.S. personnel for rape and murder whereas the U.S. State and Defense Departments insisted on "exclusive jurisdiction". Prior to the riots, U.S.-ROC relations were already fraught with tensions in part because of criminal behavior including rape on the part of MAAG personnel.

On March 20, 1957, Sgt. Robert G. Reynolds, a veteran of World War II and the Korean War who had served in Taiwan for two years as a member of MAAG, confronted Liu Ziran, purportedly a Republic of China Army Major and staff member at the Institute of Revolutionary Practice in Taiwan, outside Reynolds' duplex home on Yangmingshan (known to locals as Grass Mountain). Reynolds claimed that Liu had been peeping through the bathroom window while his wife took a bath and that when he went to the front of the duplex and called out to Liu, Liu approached with a 3-foot (91 cm) long object leading Reynolds to fire his .22 caliber revolver. He further claimed that after trying to hail Taiwanese military policemen, Liu approached a second time leading Reynolds to fire a second round. Wounded a second time, Liu walked toward a park across the street from the duplex. Later, Liu's body was found nearly 200 feet (61 m) away from the duplex. Almost immediately, U.S. and ROC criminal investigators reached different conclusions about the shooting, Initially, the Americans believed that Reynolds acted in self-defense and did not intend to pursue charges. Although ROC investigators discounted Taiwan newspaper reports that claimed that Reynolds killed Liu because both were either involved in the black market or were in love with the same Taiwanese woman, they concluded that Reynolds killed in cold blood. Liu's body faced in the direction of Reynolds' duplex suggesting that he had not been shot twice while in the act of running away but rather at pointblank range at the spot where the body lay. Moreover, no object fitting the description provided by Reynolds was found anywhere near the duplex or the body. ROC pressure eventually led U.S. authorities to hold hearings to determine if Reynolds should face court-martial. These hearings recommended that Reynolds be charged with involuntary manslaughter on the basis that while the first shot might have been fired out of fear, Reynolds could have retreated rather than putting himself in a situation to fire a second, and what proved to be a fatal, shot.

On May 20, 1957, a U.S. military court-martial convened in Taipei in the MAAG chapel. Reynolds' defense attorney told the jury of five colonels and three sergeants, all of whom served in Taiwan, that Liu was a man intent on raping Reynolds' wife and that Reynolds merely tried to protect his family. The prosecution argued that after firing the first shot, Reynolds did not have to capture what he later claimed was a burglar but instead should have retreated into his home and called police. Thus, he killed Liu out of the heat of anger. On May 23, though, the jury acquitted Reynolds of all charges. The not-guilty verdict angered ROC citizens who viewed the trial as rigged and could not understand how a person could kill another and not receive some type of punishment. Taiwanese were also outraged that an American could claim self-defense in a situation in which there was no evidence that Liu possessed any weapon.

== Riots ==
On May 24 at around 10:00 a.m., Liu's widow arrived outside the U.S. Embassy with her daughter holding a poster that stated in English and Chinese: "The Killer--Reynolds is Innocent? Protest against US Court-Martial Unfair, Unjust Decision." Within hours, a mob of 6,000 gathered outside the embassy, chanting anti-American slogans and demanding justice for Liu. In the afternoon, waves of rioters entered the embassy doing damage including smashing vehicles and furniture and destroying the American flag. According to Chiang Ching-kuo's diary, the individuals who tore down the American flag, raised the Republic of China flag, and delivered a speech from the porch were initially reported to be members of the National Salvation Corps. However, a subsequent investigation revealed that this was not the case. They were identified as a laborer, a merchant, and a peddler. Eight Americans hiding in a basement bomb shelter were driven out, some with serious injuries. Separately, a mob surrounded the Sugar Building, headquarters for MAAG-Taiwan, while another mob wrecked two USIS buildings. Eventually, protesters surrounded the Taipei Municipal Police building and wreaked destruction. When a police officer was shot, other officers opened fire on the mob. Although the ROC government ordered military forces into Taipei to restore order, rioters continued to do damage to the embassy into the evening. By the end of what became known as Black Friday, 11 Americans, 62 police officers, and 11 rioters were injured and 1 rioter was dead. The police arrested 111. The damage to the U.S. Embassy and USIS buildings totaled over $500,000 (equivalent to $5.7 million in 2025).

== Aftermath ==
The U.S. government immediately filed a protest with the ROC and accused various ROC officials including Chiang Ching-kuo, son of Chiang Kai-shek, of deliberately instigating the riots. ROC officials including Chiang Kai-shek did apologize for the riots, but the official ROC report denied allegations that the government planned and instigated the protests and riots. Instead, the report claimed that the protesters acted out of anger against the verdict in a manner that reflected spontaneity and mob psychology. The report also restated the ROC position that Reynolds had committed murder. An internal ROC investigation blamed the Chinese media in Taiwan and Hong Kong for writing inflammatory stories about the court-martial and for the rigid chain of command that prohibited ROC authorities from preventing the protests from evolving into riots. Of those arrested, 70 were released without charge. Of the remaining 41, 28 were found guilty. Two were sentenced to one year in prison, the maximum punishment meted out; the rest were sentenced to two to five months in prison. The riots ultimately reflected Chinese and Taiwanese anger over the verdict and diplomatic immunity which was perceived as extraterritoriality. The riots also touched the nerves of Asians who had their own resentments about the actions of U.S. military personnel especially in Japan which was already dealing with the Girard incident. Ultimately, both the ROC and U.S. managed to prevent the incident from causing a break in the alliance.

== See also ==
- Attacks on the United States
- Extraterritoriality
