= 1964 Moscow protest =

On 18 March 1964 approximately 50 Moroccan students broke into the embassy of Morocco in the Soviet Union in Moscow and staged an all-day sit-in protesting against death sentences handed down by a Moroccan court in Rabat four days earlier. The death sentences concerned 11 people who allegedly attempted to assassinate Moroccan King Hassan II.

Soviet authorities complied with the embassy's request to ignore extraterritoriality and remove the students by force, but later ignored the Moroccan ambassador's demand to punish the students.

== Protest ==
The students forced their way into the embassy, which was then located on Moscow's Gorki Street (now Tverskaya Street), and occupied a wing of the building. The protesters carried placards demanding the immediate release of the convicted men. They said they would stay until 10 a.m. 19 March combining sit-in with a hunger strike.

In the evening five officials from the Soviet Ministry of Education tried to persuade the students to abandon the demands. To the chagrin of authorities in Morocco, the embassy eventually asked the Soviet government to ignore extraterritoriality and storm the building to remove the students by force. Soviet authorities complied with the request. However, later, when the Moroccan ambassador asked that the students lose their stipends and be expelled from the Soviet Union, the Soviet government quietly shifted all the stipends to public organizations' accounts, and replied that it had no jurisdiction over these organizations' scholarships.
