= Peru–Russia relations =

- Peru: Russia

Diplomatic mission
- Embassy of Peru, Moscow: Embassy of Russia, Lima

Peru–Russia relations are the bilateral foreign relations between the Republic of Peru and the Russian Federation. Peru has an embassy in Moscow and an honorary consulate in Saint Petersburg. Russia has an embassy in Lima and an honorary consulate in the San Isidro District. Both countries are full members of the APEC and the United Nations.

== Background ==
=== History ===
Peru and Russia first established relations under Peruvian President Miguel de San Román, who reached out to Tsar Alexander II through a letter with the intention of beginning a process of establishing relations between the two countries. It was only in 1873 however that a Peruvian delegation would travel to the country, with bilateral relations being officially established on May 16, 1874. The two countries would then work together with Russia supplying Peru with military equipment and both countries benefiting from mutual trade.

=== Recent history ===
Following a period of surveillance by the KGB, the Soviet Union established diplomatic relations with Peru on February 1, 1969. A year later, Peru saw itself affected by an earthquake that deeply affected the Áncash region. As a response, the Soviet Union dispatched a large amount of humanitarian aid. During the transport of said aid, one Antonov An-22 crashed, killing all on board. This event as well as the general trans-continental assistance was critical in improving relations between both countries, with the embassy of Peru in Moscow celebrating on July 18 the Day of Russo-Peruvian Solidarity. The Peruvian Armed Forces use Russian equipment such as Kalashnikov rifles and MiG-29 jet fighters.

On November 13, 2010, Peru and Russia signed a visa suppression agreement which came into effect on June 21, 2011.

== Diplomatic Missions ==
- Peru has an embassy in Moscow.
- Russia has an embassy in Lima.
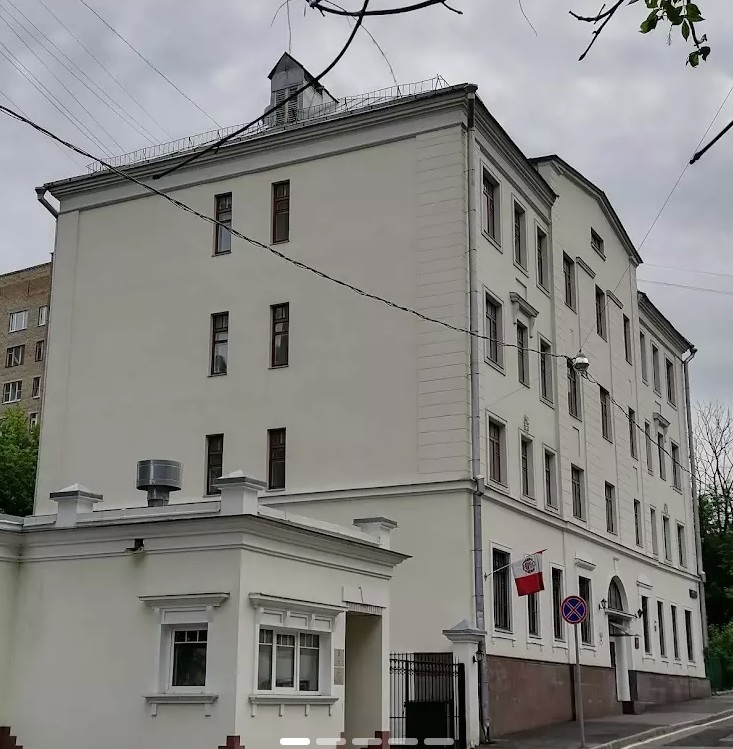
Embassy of Peru in Moscow

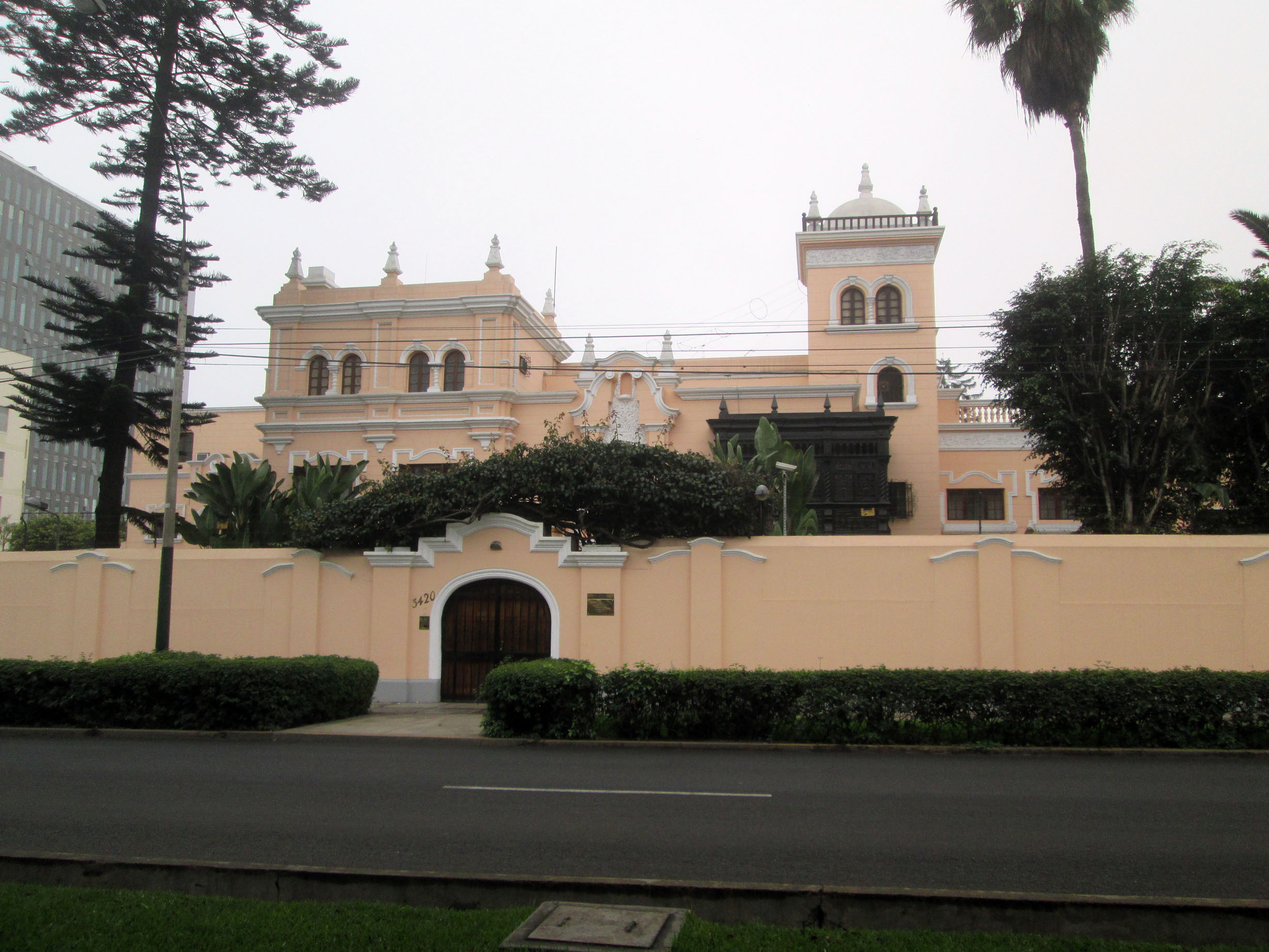
Embassy of Russia in Lima

== See also ==
- Foreign relations of Peru
- Foreign relations of Russia
- List of ambassadors of Russia to Peru
- List of ambassadors of Peru to Russia
- 1970 Atlantic Ocean Antonov An-22 crash
