= 1987 North Korean embassy attack in Lima =

Terrorist attack in Lima, Peru

1987 North Korean embassy attack
- Part of the Internal conflict in Peru
- Damage caused to the trade office in the streets of Lima.
- Location: Calle Los Nogales 227, San Isidro, Lima, Peru
- Date: April 30, 1987 c. 10 a.m. (EDT)
- Target: North Korean Trade Office, Lima
- Attack type: Bombing; Communist terrorism
- Deaths: 0
- Injuries: 2
- Perpetrator: Shining Path

The 1987 North Korean embassy attack in Lima was a terrorist attack that took place on April 30, 1987, against the trade office and official residence of the delegation of North Korea in Peru. The attack left two people injured.

== Background ==
North Korea, like China and the Soviet Union, turned its back on the communist Shining Path insurgency in Peru, despite leftist ideological similarities; mainly due to North Korean economic interests in the South American country during the government of Alan García.

In 1986, the Peruvian government bought 10,000 AK-47s of Soviet origin from the North Korean government. These weapons were intended to improve the weapons of the Peruvian National Police to counter the Senderista insurgency.

== Attack ==
The attack began at midmorning on April 30, 1987, by a group of three individuals, two men and a woman carrying a briefcase. The group entered the plaza outside the embassy where they rang the doorbell of the main building, taking hostage a Peruvian worker from the site who answered the doorbell.

The woman who led the attack carried around 35 sticks of dynamite in her briefcase. They were installed at the main interior door of the embassy and exploded, affecting the entire building and two nearby houses. Although the explosion was powerful, at the time of the attack the North Korean embassy was understaffed. In addition to the hostage, another employer at the site was injured in the face by flying glass.

== Aftermath ==
The attackers fled in a car. The North Korean representative Kim Shan Sik, at the time of the attack, was in his private home in downtown Lima.

Almost a year after the attack, in March 1988, the Peruvian government bought a further 10.000 AKM rifles and 10 million rounds of 7.62mm bullets from North Korea. These were distributed to police forces after accusations that they had originally been intended for the APRA ruling party's paramilitary arm. An earlier scandal broke out after an opposition newspaper revealed that the weapons were shipped with false shipping documents. The government admitted to this, but stated that North Korea had asked that the weapons contract and shipping documents be falsified, reportedly "as a security measure for their maritime shipment."

Another attack was attempted in 1989, but the bomb did not detonate as it was defused by the Peruvian Police.

== See also ==
- Japanese embassy hostage crisis
- 1986 Soviet embassy attack in Lima
- Deng Xiaoping's dogs
