= List of ambassadors of Sweden to Indonesia =

Ambassador of Sweden to Indonesia
- Lesser coat of arms of the Kingdom of Sweden

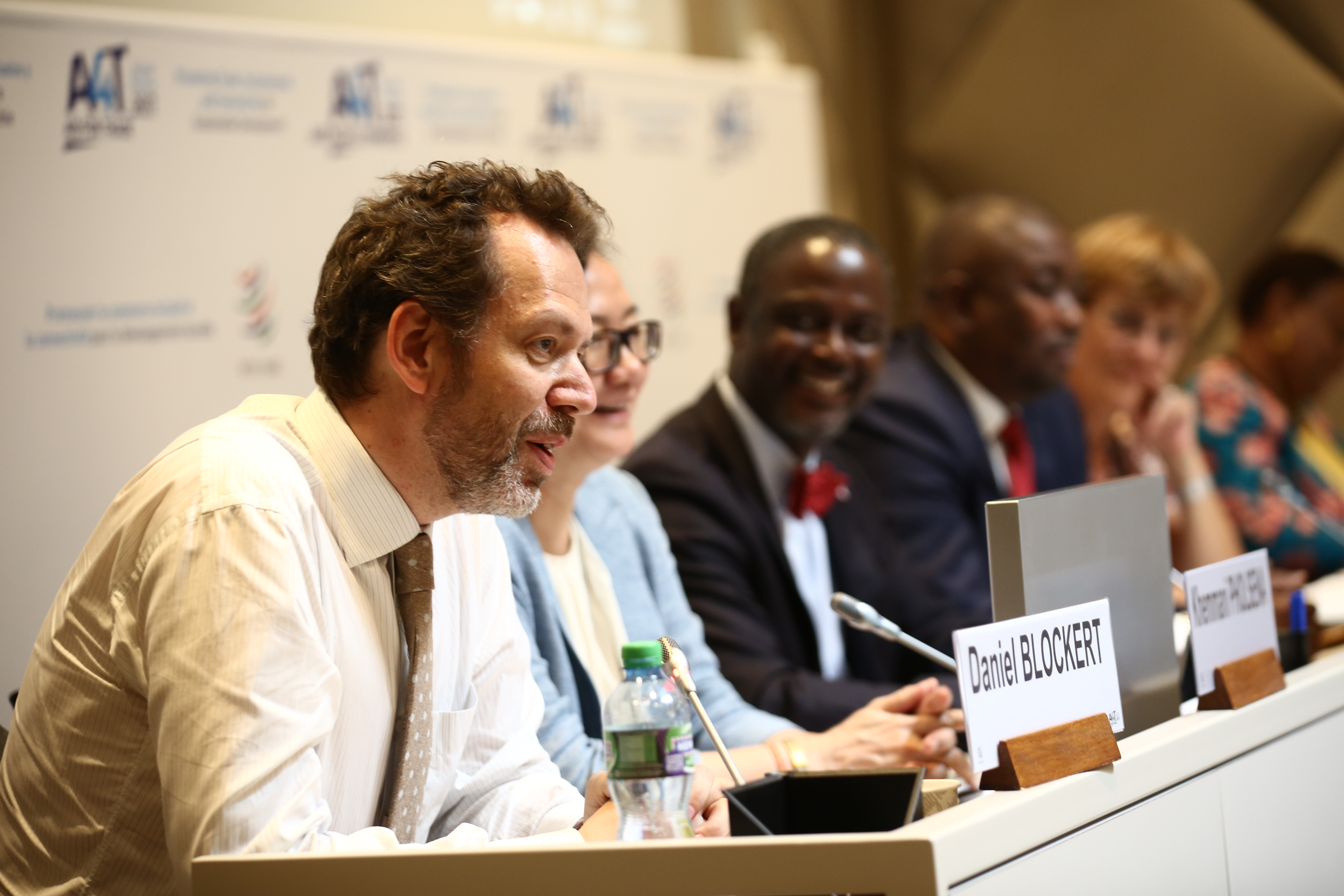
- Incumbent; Daniel Blockert since August 2023
- Ministry for Foreign Affairs; Swedish Embassy, Jakarta
- Style: His or Her Excellency (formal); Mr. or Madam Ambassador (informal)
- Reports to: Minister for Foreign Affairs
- Residence: Jl. Sriwijaya Raya No. 11A, Kebayoran Baru
- Seat: Jakarta, Indonesia
- Appointer: Government of Sweden
- Term length: No fixed term
- Inaugural holder: Malte Pripp
- Formation: 12 February 1953
- Website: Swedish Embassy, Jakarta

The Ambassador of Sweden to Indonesia (known formally as the Ambassador of the Kingdom of Sweden to the Republic of Indonesia) is the official representative of the government of Sweden to the president of Indonesia and government of Indonesia.

== History ==
Sweden recognized the United States of Indonesia in 1949. Through the Swedish consul in Surabaya, Director Axel Wieslander, a message was conveyed to the foreign minister of the United States of Indonesia on the occasion of the transfer of sovereignty and the proclamation of the new state on 28 December 1949. In this message, Sweden recognized the Republic of the United States of Indonesia as a free and independent state with effect from that same day. The Indonesian foreign minister was further informed that the Swedish government intended to send a diplomatic representative to the republic in the near future. Pending this appointment, the vice consul at the Consulate General in Jakarta, T. A. E. Andrée, was entrusted with the temporary responsibility of heading the consulate general.

In April 1950, Carl Douglas was appointed as chargé d'affaires ad interim to head the newly established Swedish legation in Indonesia.

In November 1952, Malte Pripp was appointed as Sweden's first resident minister in Jakarta. In January 1953, the Swedish minister in Jakarta was also accredited to Manila, Philippines. Pripp took office on 12 February 1953, and in the same month, he presented his credentials to President Sukarno of Indonesia.

In May 1958, an agreement was reached between the Swedish and Indonesian governments to elevate their respective legations to embassies. As a result, the diplomatic rank was changed from envoy extraordinary and minister plenipotentiary to ambassador.

In November 1958, the Swedish ambassador in Jakarta was appointed as envoy extraordinary and minister plenipotentiary to Kuala Lumpur, Federation of Malaya.

The accreditation for Kuala Lumpur was taken over by the Swedish ambassador in Bangkok in 1964. The accreditation for Manila was taken over by the Swedish ambassador in Manila after Sweden opened an embassy in the Philippines in 1980.

The Swedish ambassador in Jakarta has also served as the ambassador to Dili since 2002, following the establishment of diplomatic relations between Sweden and Timor-Leste on 20 May of the same year.

== List of representatives ==
Name	Period	Title	Notes	Presented credentials	Ref
Carl Douglas	1950–1953	Chargé d'affaires ad interim			
Malte Pripp	12 February 1953 – 1956	Envoy	Also accredited to Manila.		
Jens Malling	1956 – May 1958	Envoy	Also accredited to Manila.		
Jens Malling	May 1958 – 1959	Ambassador	Also accredited to Kuala Lumpur and Manila.		
Tord Göransson	1959–1962	Ambassador	Also accredited to Kuala Lumpur and Manila.		
Louis De Geer	1962–1966	Ambassador	Also accredited to Kuala Lumpur (until 1964) and Manila.		
Harald Edelstam	1966–1968	Ambassador	Also accredited to Manila.		
Karl Henrik Andersson	1969–1973	Ambassador	Also accredited to Manila.		
Cai Melin	1973–1977	Ambassador	Also accredited to Manila (from 1974).		
Knut Granstedt	1977–1981	Ambassador	Also accredited to Manila (until 1980).		
Arne Lellki	1981–1986	Ambassador			
Karl-Göran Engström	1985–1990	Ambassador			
Lars-Erik Wingren	1990–1994	Ambassador			
Mikael Lindström	1994–1998	Ambassador			
Harald Sandberg	1998–2003	Ambassador	Also accredited to Dili (from 2002).		
Lennart Linnér	2003–2007	Ambassador	Also accredited to Dili.		
Ann Marie Bolin Pennegård	2007–2009	Ambassador	Also accredited to Dili.		
Ewa Polano	September 2009 – 20 June 2014	Ambassador	Also accredited to Dili.		
Johanna Brismar Skoog	2014–2018	Ambassador	Also accredited to Dili.	13 October 2014	
Marina Berg	1 September 2018 – 2023	Ambassador	Also accredited to Dili and Port Moresby.	8 November 2018	
Daniel Blockert	August 2023 – present	Ambassador	Also accredited to Dili and Port Moresby.		

== See also ==
- Indonesia–Sweden relations
