= Archibald Douglas (1883–1960) =

Swedish count, general and politician

Count Archibald Douglas
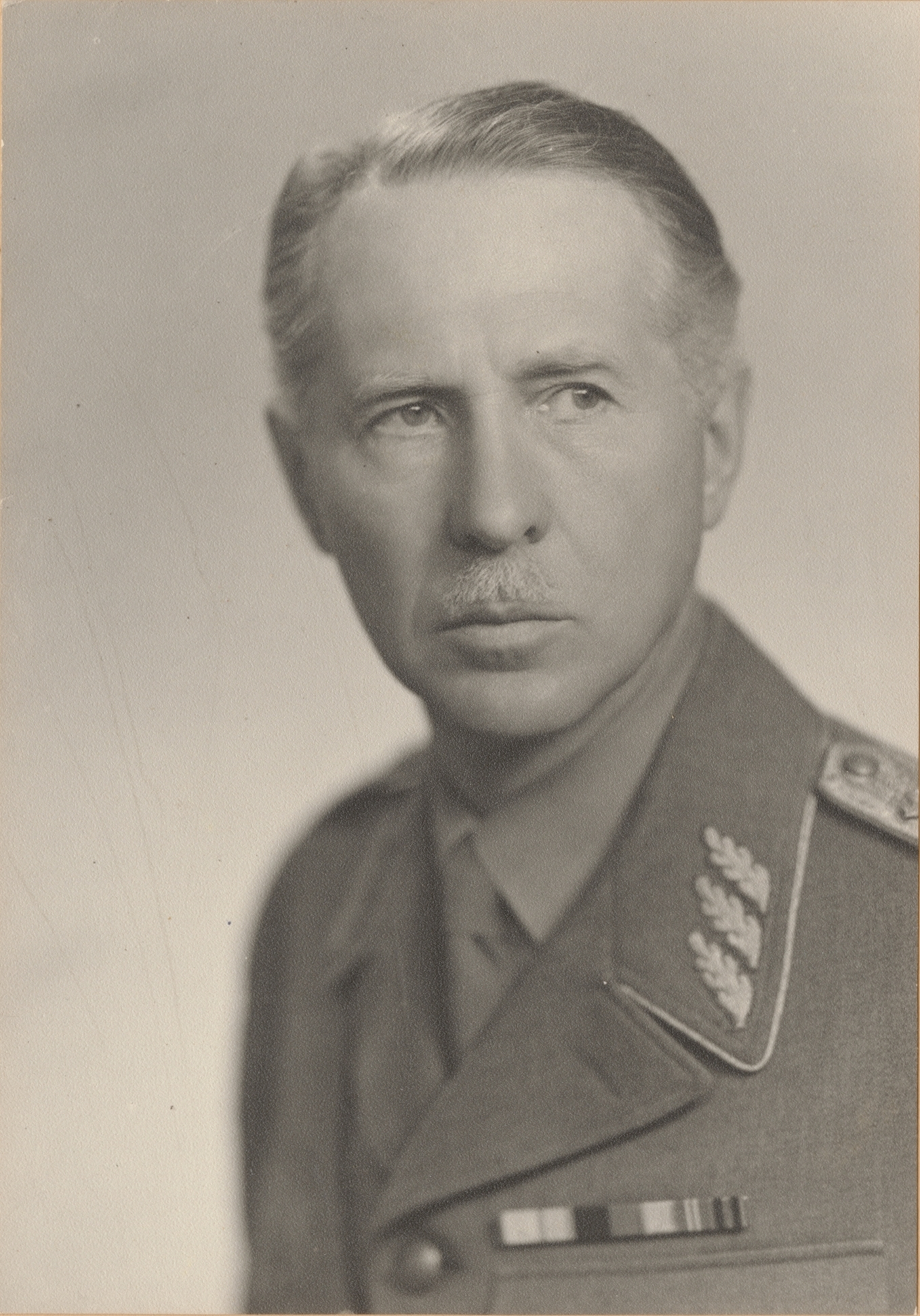
- Born: Wilhelm Archibald Douglas; 19 July 1883; Stjärnorp Castle, Sweden
- Died: 5 July 1960 (aged 76); Grensholm, Sweden
- Military career
- Allegiance: Sweden
- Branch: Swedish Army
- Service years: 1903–1948
- Rank: Lieutenant General
- Nickname: Archie
- Commands: Norrland Dragoon Regiment; Life Regiment of Horse; Upper Norrland's Troops; Inspector of the Swedish Army; Chief of the Army
- Conflicts: Finnish Civil War; Battle of Länkipohja; Battle of Tampere

Lieutenant General Count Wilhelm Archibald Douglas (19 July 1883 – 5 July 1960) was a senior Swedish Army officer and nobleman. Douglas had a remarkable career marked by military achievements and high-ranking positions. Commissioned as an officer in 1903, he quickly rose through the ranks, attaining the rank of lieutenant in the Life Regiment Dragoons in 1906. During World War I, he served as a general staff officer in the 1st Army Division, and in 1918, he played a significant role in the Finnish Civil War, becoming captain and lieutenant colonel in the Finnish Army and participating in key battles.

Returning to Sweden, Douglas continued his military career, holding various positions such as chief of staff of the 5th Army Division and commanding officer of the Norrland Dragoon Regiment. His promotions continued, reaching major general in 1937, and he later served as Chief of the Army from 1944 to 1948. In addition to his military duties, Douglas was a member of the Stockholm City Council and held roles as aide-de-camp and chief aide-de-camp to King Gustaf V. Apart from his military career, Douglas was also a prolific writer, producing biographical literature, including works on Marshal Carl Gustaf Emil Mannerheim and his ancestor, Swedish Field Marshal Robert Douglas, Count of Skenninge.

In 1933, together with a number of other officers, Douglas was one of the initiators of the formation of the National Socialist Bloc. The project was an attempt to unite the many different Swedish Nazi organizations to join together in a common party. However, only a number of smaller groups, such as the Swedish National Socialist Union Party and the National Socialist Union, joined. The members of the party came mostly from the upper class and many were officers.

== Early life ==
Douglas was born on 19 July 1883 at Stjärnorp Castle, Östergötland County as the second of four sons of Count Ludvig Douglas, Marshal of the Realm, and Countess Anna Louise Dorotea (née Ehrensvärd). His younger brother, Count Carl Douglas (1888–1946), was a chamberlain, and his elder brother Robert (1880–1955), a nobleman in Germany, married dowager Queen Augusta Victoria of Portugal, widow of King Manuel II. Archibald Douglas was cousin to General Carl August Ehrensvärd (his successor on the Chief of the Army post), Vice Admiral Gösta Ehrensvärd and deputy director of the Ministry of Defence Augustin Ehrensvärd.

== Career ==
He was commissioned as an officer in 1903 and was promoted to lieutenant in the Life Regiment Dragoons (K 2) in 1906. Douglas was lieutenant in the General Staff in 1913 and served as general staff officer in the staff of the 1st Army Division (I. arméfördelningen) from 1914 to 1917. He was promoted to captain in 1916 and did the same year a study trip to Galicia region in Central-Eastern Europe. Back in Sweden, Douglas served as a military history teacher at the Royal Swedish Army Staff College in Stockholm from 1917 to 1918 and as general staff officer at the Finnish headquarters during the Finnish Civil War in 1918. During his time in Finland in 1918, he became captain and lieutenant colonel in the Finnish Army and took part in the Battle of Länkipohja and Battle of Tampere. Back in Sweden, Douglas became ryttmästare and squadron commander in the Life Regiment Dragoons in 1919 and taught ground warfare at the Royal Swedish Naval Staff College on and off between 1919 and 1929.

In 1922, Douglas returned to the General Staff as captain and became major there in 1924. He served as chief of staff of the 5th Army Division (V. arméfördelningen) from 1923 to 1927 when he became major in the Life Regiment Dragoons. Douglas became lieutenant colonel in the Life Regiment of Horse (K 1) in 1928. He was promoted to colonel and appointed commanding officer of Norrland Dragoon Regiment (K 4) in 1930 and in 1935 Douglas was appointed executive officer of the Life Regiment of Horse. In 1937 Douglas was promoted to major general and appointed commanding officer of Upper Norrland's Troops (Övre Norrlands trupper) and in 1940 he conducted a study trip to Germany and France. In 1942 he was appointed Inspector of the Swedish Army and the year after he was chairman of the Officer Training Investigation (Officersutbildningsutredningen). In 1944, Douglas was promoted to lieutenant general and was appointed Chief of the Army. During this time he also served as president of the Royal Swedish Academy of War Sciences from 1945 to 1947.

During Douglas' time as army chief, the Meyerhöffer affair occurred. The Meyerhöffer affair involved officer Alf Meyerhöffer, known for his nationalist and pro-German views. He was politically active but later joined the military. Douglas valued Meyerhöffer's skills as a military trainer. Meyerhöffer distanced himself from politics but faced controversy due to his past. The government, under Douglas's support, promoted Meyerhöffer, leading to public and press criticism. The Meyerhöffer affair highlighted internal conflicts within the Swedish military and its relations with Nazi Germany.

Douglas retired from the military in 1948. Beside his military career, Douglas was a member of the Stockholm City Council from 1921 to 1923 and served as aide-de-camp to King Gustaf V from 1920 to 1930 and as chief aide-de-camp (överadjutant) to King Gustaf V from 1931 to 1950.

== Personal life ==
In 1907 he married Astri Henschen (1883–1976) in Ronneby. She was the daughter of Professor Salomon Eberhard Henschen and Gerda (née Sandell). Douglas lived in Villa Parkudden in Djurgården, and from 1947 also owned Stjärnorp Castle in East Gothland. The ancestral Stjärnorp Castle, which his father had purchased back to the family some years before Archibald's birth, was designated as Archibald's family seat.

He was the father of Ambassador Carl Douglas (1908–1961) and company executive Archibald Douglas (1910–1992) and grandfather of financier Gustaf Douglas. Through his eldest son, Carl Ludvig, he is the grandfather of Princess Elisabeth, Duchess in Bavaria, wife of Prince Max, Duke in Bavaria, and of Rosita Spencer-Churchill, Duchess of Marlborough, the third wife of John Spencer-Churchill, 11th Duke of Marlborough, they divorced in 2008. He is the great-grandfather of Sophie, Hereditary Princess of Liechtenstein.

Douglas wrote biographical literature and biographies of Marshal of Finland Carl Gustaf Emil Mannerheim (his Finnish contemporary), and Swedish Field Marshal Robert Douglas, Count of Skenninge, his ancestor.

== Death ==
Douglas died in a car accident in Grensholm near Linköping on 5 July 1960. Douglas, who was 76 at the time, was on his way home from a visit to Norrköping. His eldest son, the Swedish Ambassador to Brazil Carl Douglas, also died in a car accident, just six months later.

== Dates of rank ==
- 1906 – Lieutenant
- 1916 – Captain
- 1919 – Ryttmästare
- 1924 – Major
- 1928 – Lieutenant colonel
- 1930 – Colonel
- 1937 – Major general
- 1944 – Lieutenant general

== Awards and decorations ==
=== Swedish ===
- (Sweden) King Gustaf V's Jubilee Commemorative Medal (1948)
- (Sweden) King Gustaf V's Jubilee Commemorative Medal (1928)
- (Sweden) King Gustaf V's Commemorative Medal (16 February 1951)
- (Sweden) Commander Grand Cross of the Order of the Sword (6 June 1944)
- (Sweden) Commander 1st Class of the Order of the Sword (14 November 1936)
- (Sweden) Commander of the Order of the Sword (25 November 1933)
- (Sweden) Knight of the Order of the Sword (1924)
- (Sweden) Knight of the Order of the Polar Star (1931)
- (Sweden) Knights of the Order of Vasa (1929)
- (Sweden) Home Guard Medal of Merit in Gold
- (Sweden) National Association of Volunteer Motor Transport Corps Medal of Merit in gold

=== Foreign ===
- (Denmark) Grand Cross of the Order of the Dannebrog
- (Norway) Grand Cross of the Order of St. Olav
- (Finland) 2nd Class of the Order of the Cross of Liberty with Swords
- (Finland) 3rd Class of the Order of the Cross of Liberty with Swords
- Commander 1st Class of the Order of the White Rose of Finland
- Commander of the Order of the Star of Ethiopia
- (Czechoslovakia) Commander 2nd Class of the Order of the White Lion
- (Netherlands) Officer of the Order of Orange-Nassau with Swords
- (Russian Empire) 3rd Class of the Order of Saint Stanislaus

== Honours ==
- Member of the Royal Swedish Academy of War Sciences (1936)

== Bibliography ==
- Douglas, Archibald (1925). Operationerna kring Tammerfors 1918 [The operations around Tampere in 1918] (in Swedish). Stockholm: Bonnier. SELIBR 1471663.
- Douglas, Archibald (1950). Jag blev officer [I became an officer] (in Swedish). Stockholm: Bonnier. SELIBR 483957.
- Douglas, Archibald, ed. (1951). Prins Gustaf Adolf: en minnesbok [Prince Gustaf Adolf: a memorial book] (in Swedish). Stockholm: Norstedt. SELIBR 1452035.
- Douglas, Archibald (1951). Mannerheim (in Swedish). [Uppsala]. SELIBR 2992346.
- Douglas, Archibald (1957). Robert Douglas: en krigargestalt från vår storhetstid [Robert Douglas: a warrior figure from our heyday] (in Swedish). Stockholm: Bonnier. SELIBR 8224568.

Military offices
Preceded by Pontus Reuterswärd	Upper Norrland Troops; 1937–1942	Succeeded by None
Preceded by None	Inspector of the Swedish Army; 1942–1944	Succeeded by Sven Ryman
Preceded by Ivar Holmquist	Chief of the Army; 1944–1948	Succeeded by Carl August Ehrensvärd
Professional and academic associations
Preceded by Erik Testrup	President of the Royal Swedish Academy of War Sciences; 1945–1947	Succeeded by Bengt Nordenskiöld
