= Carl Douglas (diplomat) =

Swedish diplomat (1908–1961)

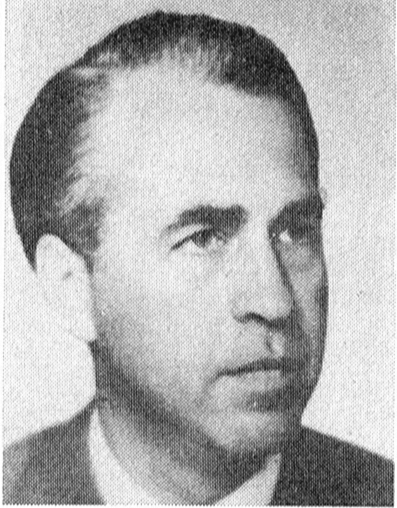
- Born: Carl Ludvig Douglas; 26 July 1908; Stockholm, Sweden
- Died: 21 January 1961 (aged 52); Rio de Janeiro, Brazil
- Education: Norra Latin
- Occupation: Diplomat
- Years active: 1933–1961
- Spouse: Ottora Haas-Heye (m. 1935)
- Children: 4, including Gustaf and Rosita
- Father: Archibald Douglas
- Relatives: Ludvig Douglas (paternal grandfather); Salomon Eberhard Henschen (maternal grandfather)

Carl Ludvig Douglas (26 July 1908 – 21 January 1961) was a Swedish diplomat. Douglas began his career at the Ministry for Foreign Affairs in 1933, quickly rising through the ranks. He served in various diplomatic missions, including in Paris, Helsinki, Oslo, Madrid, and Washington, D.C., before becoming a director in 1946. In 1960, he was appointed ambassador to Rio de Janeiro. Tragically, Douglas died in a car accident in Brazil in January 1961, just six months after his father's similar death in Sweden.

== Early life ==
Douglas was born on 26 July 1908 at Stjärnorp Castle in Stjärnorp Parish, Linköping Municipality, Sweden. He was part of the Swedish-German branch of Clan Douglas from the Scottish Lowlands and was the son of Lieutenant General Count Archibald Douglas (1883–1960) and his wife, Astri Henschen (1883–1976).

His paternal grandfather was Count Ludvig Douglas, Marshal of the Realm, and his uncles were Count Robert Douglas, a courtier and estate owner, and Count Carl Douglas, a chamberlain and estate manager. His maternal grandfather was Salomon Eberhard Henschen, a doctor, professor, and neurologist. Douglas had three brothers: Archibald (1910–1992), Jakob Morton (born 1912), and Gustaf Ludvig Salomon (1917–1934).

Douglas grew up in Villa Parkudden on Djurgården in Stockholm and attended Norra Latin from first grade until studentexamen. Douglas received a Candidate of Law degree in 1931.

== Career ==
Douglas began his career at the Ministry for Foreign Affairs in Stockholm as an attaché in 1933. He was promoted to second secretary in 1936 and first secretary in 1939, serving at diplomatic missions in Paris, Helsinki, Oslo, and Madrid. In 1946, he became a director (byråchef) at the Ministry of Foreign Affairs.

From 1946 to 1948, he was a rapporteur at the Ministry of Supply and served as a member of the Swedish Clearing Office (clearingnämnden) from 1948 to 1950. In 1950, he was appointed chargé d'affaires ad interim in Jakarta, and in 1953, he became a counselor at the Swedish embassy in Washington, D.C., with the rank of minister plenipotentiary. In 1958, he returned to the Ministry for Foreign Affairs as a director, and in February 1960, he was appointed ambassador to Rio de Janeiro, assuming the post in April of that year.

== Personal life ==
On 30 October 1935, Douglas married Ottora Maria Haas-Heye (born 13 February 1910) from Germany, the daughter of Professor Otto Ludwig Haas-Heye and Victoria zu Eulenburg, and sister of Libertas Schulze-Boysen. They had four children: Gustaf (1938–2023), Elisabeth (1940–2026), Rosita (born 1943), and Philip (born 1945).

He was the grandfather of financier and diver Count Carl Douglas and financier Count Eric Douglas.

== Death ==
=== Road incident ===
Douglas died in a car accident in Brazil on 21 January 1961, six months after his father had been killed in a car accident in Sweden. The crash occurred on the highway between Rio de Janeiro and São Paulo. Douglas hit a pothole, lost control of the vehicle, and skidded off the road down an embankment. An ambulance was dispatched from the nearest town, Nova Iguaçu, but he succumbed to his injuries on the way to the hospital. His wife, who was also in the car, sustained only minor injuries.

=== Funeral ===
Douglas's remains were flown to Bromma Airport on 25 January 1961. Family members, representatives from the Ministry for Foreign Affairs—including Foreign Minister Östen Undén—and members of the Brazilian embassy gathered in the royal waiting hall. As the casket was carried out of the aircraft, an honor guard of eight personnel from the Civil Aviation Administration stood in formation. After a wreath-laying ceremony, the casket was placed in a hearse and transported directly to the Douglas family estate, Stjärnorp Castle in Östergötland.

The funeral was held at Vreta Kloster Church on 28 January 1961. The Ministry for Foreign Affairs was represented by a delegation led by State Secretary for Foreign Affairs Leif Belfrage, along with classmates from the Swedish National Defence College, including Colonel Georg von Döbeln. The officiant was Parish Priest G.-A. Andræ. Attorney Styrbjörn Hybinette from Stockholm sang "Hemlängtan" by Josephson and "Litanei" by Franz Schubert. Music director Arthur Bartler from Linköping played "Arioso" by Johann Sebastian Bach on the violin. Wreaths were sent by, among others, the Ministry for Foreign Affairs, the Brazilian Embassy, the Norwegian Ministry of Foreign Affairs, the Swedish Church's Seamen's Care Committee, colleagues at the Ministry for Foreign Affairs, friends in London, fellow students, as well as tenants and employees at Stjärnorp.

== Awards and decorations ==
- (Sweden) Knight of the Order of the Polar Star (1949)
- (Belgium) Commander of the Order of Leopold II
- (Netherlands) Commander of the Order of Orange-Nassau
- (Portugal) Commander of the Military Order of Christ
- (Spain) Commander of the Order of Isabella the Catholic
- (Norway) Knight 1st Class of the Order of St. Olav
- Knight of the Order of the White Rose of Finland
- (France) Knight of the Order of the Black Star
- (Norway) King Haakon VII Freedom Cross

Diplomatic posts
Preceded by Jan Stenström	Ambassador of Sweden to Brazil; 1960–1961	Succeeded by Jens Malling
