= Ludvig Douglas =

Swedish politician (1849–1916)

His Excellency Ludvig Douglas
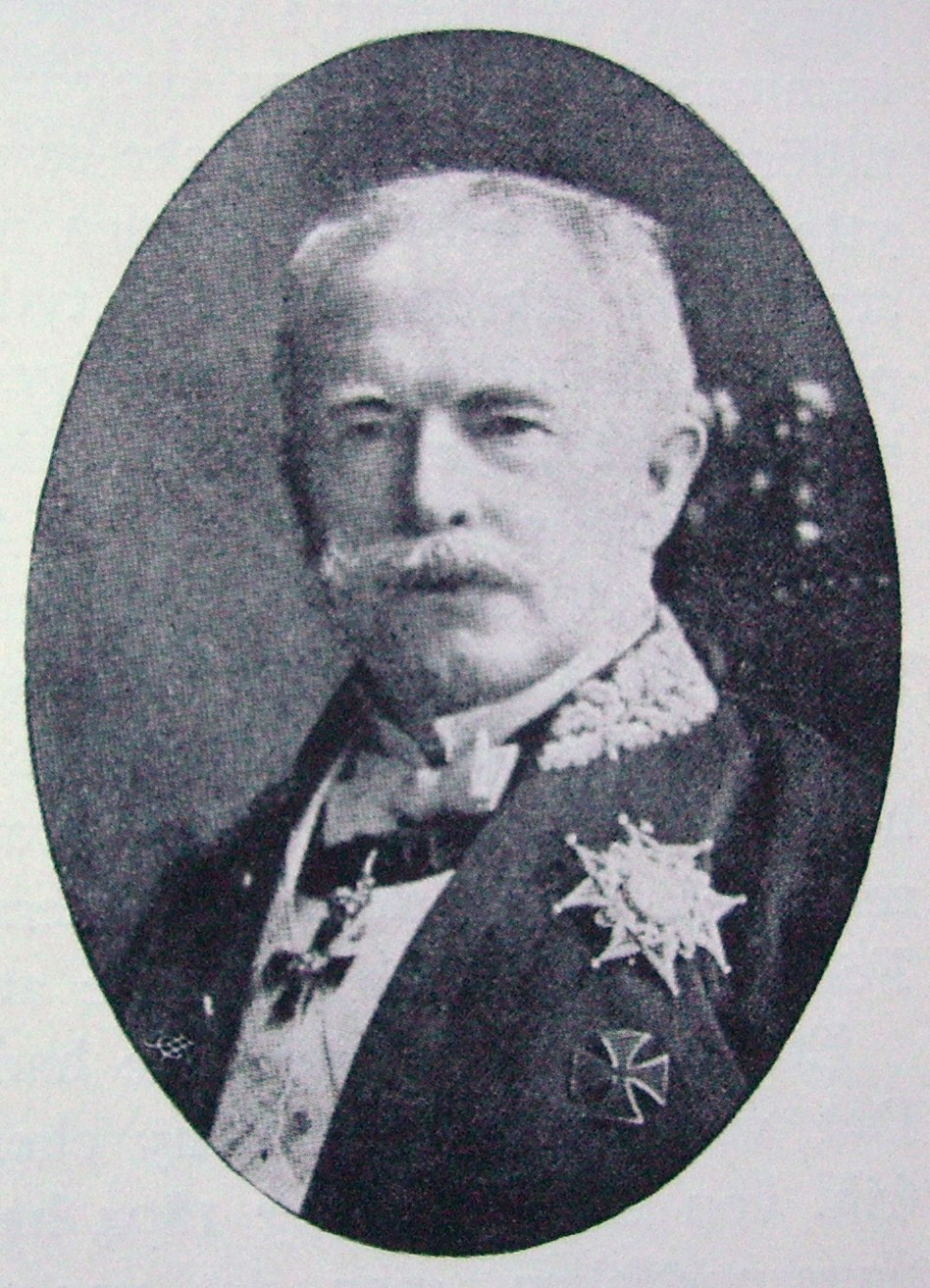

Minister of Foreign Affairs of Sweden
- In office 1895–1899

Marshal of the Realm
- In office 1911–1916

Governor of Uppsala County
- In office 1893–1895

Governor of Östergötland County
- In office 1901–1912

Personal details
- Born: 24 November 1849 Zürich, Switzerland
- Died: 20 July 1916 (aged 66)

Ludvig Vilhelm August Douglas, Count of Mühlhausen, Gondelsheim, Skenninge and Stjernorp, Lord of Langenstein and Stjernorp castles (24 November 1849 – 20 July 1916), was a conservative Swedish politician and official. He was a direct patrilineal descendant of Field Marshal Robert Douglas.

Ludvig Douglas was born at Zürich, Switzerland. His parents were Count Carl Israel Douglas, first count of the Douglas family in the nobility of Baden (since 1848) as Count of Mühlhausen, and his wife Countess Louise von Gondelsheim and Langenstein, herself a daughter of the morganatic marriage of Louis I, Grand Duke of Baden and Katharina Werner. Through his mother, he was a second cousin of Victoria of Baden, wife of King Gustaf V of Sweden.

He received the fideicommiss of Muhlhausen and the castle of Langenstein as his share of the family inheritance and reclaimed in c1875 his ancestral castle of Stjernorp in Sweden, which had been lost to his family after a fire in 1789. He ultimately succeeded his childless elder brother as head of the comital House of Douglas.

Douglas was a protectionist and solidly oriented towards Germany. From 1895 to 1899, he served as Minister of Foreign Affairs of Sweden. He resigned because he refused to accept that Norway (then in union with Sweden) would have their flag without the mark of the union, i.e. he opposed the so-called pure flag.

He also held the position of Riksmarskalk (Marshal of the Realm) (1911–1916), Landshövding (governor) of Uppsala County (1893–1895), and Landshövding (governor) of Östergötland County (1901–1912). Douglas worked for the Norrlander farmers' party against the forest products companies, they demanded protective legislation in field of wood market.

Count Ludvig died at Lysekil, and is buried at the Douglas family graveyard in Vreta monastic church, Sweden.

His wife was Countess Anna Louise Ehrensvärd, daughter of Count Albert Ehrensvärd the Elder, Minister of Foreign Affairs of Sweden (1885–1889), and sister of Count Albert Ehrensvärd the Younger, Minister of Foreign Affairs of Sweden (1911–1914).

The Swedish branch of the Counts Douglas, to which Ludvig belonged, was the main surviving lineage of the family until Ludvig's sons and grandsons created several new branches (which spread over both Sweden and Germany. Lines descended from Ludvig Douglas include:

- Counts von Douglas-Langenstein, descendants of Robert, eldest son of Ludvig. They still hold Langenstein Castle in Baden-Württemberg, Germany. Robert's second (and childless) wife was Augusta Victoria of Hohenzollern, dowager queen of Portugal.
  - Counts Douglas, Barons von Reischach, descendants of a grandson of Robert von Douglas-Langenstein
  - Counts Douglas-Gerstorp, the branch (settled in Sweden) descending from the youngest son of Robert von Douglas-Langenstein
- Counts Douglas-Stjernorp, the branch descending from the Swedish general Archibald Douglas-Stjernorp, second son of Ludvig. This branch resides at Stjärnorp Castle and Rydboholm Castle. Archibald, through his eldest son, Carl Ludvig, is the grandfather of financier Count Gustaf Douglas and his sisters, Princess Elisabeth, Duchess in Bavaria and Rosita Spencer-Churchill, Duchess of Marlborough.
- Counts Douglas-Kolfall, the branch descending from Oscar, the youngest son of Ludvig.

== Honours ==
- Sweden:
  - Knight of the Polar Star, 1892; Commander 1st Class, 1895; Commander Grand Cross, 1896
  - Knight and Commander of the Seraphim, 21 January 1898
  - Knight of the Order of Charles XIII, 28 January 1904
  - Commander Grand Cross of the Order of Vasa, 2 June 1906
  - Crown Prince Gustaf V and Crown Princess Victoria Silver Wedding Medal, 1906
- Austria-Hungary: Grand Cross of the Imperial Order of Leopold, 1897
- Belgium: Grand Cordon of the Royal Order of Leopold
- Denmark: Grand Cross of the Dannebrog, 16 October 1897; in Diamonds, 1915
- Empire of Japan: Grand Cordon of the Rising Sun
- Norway: Grand Cross of St. Olav
- Ottoman Empire: Order of Osmanieh, 1st Class
- (Thailand) Siam: Grand Cross of the White Elephant
- Spain: Grand Cross of the Order of Charles III, 3 January 1898
- German Empire:
  - Knight of the Prussian Crown, 2nd Class
  - Knight of the Red Eagle, 1st Class
  - Baden: Commander of the Zähringer Lion, 2nd Class
  - (Duchy of Nassau) Nassau Ducal Family: Commander of Adolphe of Nassau, 1st Class
