= List of ambassadors of Sweden to Chile =

Ambassador of Sweden to Chile
- Lesser coat of arms of the Kingdom of Sweden
- Incumbent; Sofia Karlberg since 2025
- Ministry for Foreign Affairs; Swedish Embassy, Santiago
- Style: His or Her Excellency (formal); Mr. or Madam Ambassador (informal)
- Reports to: Minister for Foreign Affairs
- Residence: Calle Via Celeste 9640, Vitacura
- Seat: Santiago, Chile
- Appointer: Government of Sweden
- Term length: No fixed term
- Inaugural holder: Carl Hultgren
- Formation: 1 April 1918
- Website: Swedish Embassy, Santiago

The Ambassador of Sweden to Chile (known formally as the Ambassador of the Kingdom of Sweden to the Republic of Chile) is the official representative of the government of Sweden to the president of Chile and government of Chile.

== History ==
The Swedish foreign minister, in a 14 January 1918 report to the King in Council regarding the 1919 national budget, reviewed Sweden's trade and maritime relations with South America. Concerning Chile, he noted that Sweden was represented only by an honorary consul in Valparaíso, who was also head of a large British firm. It was considered desirable to have a paid Swedish representative in Chile. This could be achieved without creating a separate consular or chargé d'affaires post by accrediting Sweden's diplomatic representative in Buenos Aires also to the Chilean Republic. Thanks to the new railway over the Andes, the distance between Buenos Aires and Santiago was small enough for the head of mission to visit Chile regularly. During his absence, a commercial attaché serving both countries could handle ongoing duties, and a consular officer could be added later if needed. Sweden's first minister accredited in Chile was Carl Hultgren, who was appointed as envoy extraordinary and minister plenipotentiary to the Argentine and Chilean republics, with residence in Buenos Aires, starting on 1 April 1918.

In 1929 the Swedish Parliament decided to establish a salaried vice-consulate in Valparaíso. On 1 July 1933 the vice-consulate was moved to Chile's capital, Santiago. When the then–vice-consul Torsten Vinell went on an extended approved leave at the beginning of 1934, the legation counsellor Axel Paulin who worked at the mission in Buenos Aires—and who had also been registered with the Chilean government as a member of the mission in Santiago—was appointed to serve as substitute. At the same time, he was notified to the Chilean government as chargé d’affaires ad interim. This was considered natural since his regular post was diplomatic, and the arrangement entailed no additional costs for the state. When the vice-consul position later became vacant, the same diplomat was appointed on 1 July 1934 to temporarily manage that post as well.

In 1949, Sweden appointed its first resident minister in Santiago, Envoy Folke Wennerberg. He presented his credentials to Chilean President Gabriel González Videla on 7 April.

In November 1956, an agreement was reached between the Swedish and Chilean governments on the mutual elevation of the respective countries' legations to embassies. The diplomatic rank was thereafter changed to ambassador instead of envoy extraordinary and minister plenipotentiary.

Following the military coup in Chile on 11 September 1973, Sweden's ambassador, Harald Edelstam, was declared persona non grata in December of the same year for helping over 1,200 Chileans, hundreds of Cuban diplomats and civilians, and around 50 Uruguayan refugees escape persecution under dictator Augusto Pinochet. To signal its disapproval, Sweden did not appoint a new ambassador. Carl-Johan Groth took over as head of mission with the rank of chargé d'affaires. No new Swedish ambassador was appointed in Santiago for the next 17 years while the Government Junta ruled Chile.

In 1990, Sweden once again had a Swedish ambassador in Chile for the first time since the military coup of 1973. On 20 April, Sweden's then chargé d'affaires, Staffan Wrigstad, presented his credentials to Chile's new president, Patricio Aylwin. According to Foreign Minister Sten Andersson, Sweden sought to accredit a new ambassador in Santiago as quickly as possible following the change of power, as a way to further demonstrate its strong support for Chile's democratic government.

== List of representatives ==
Name	Period	Title	Resident / Concurrent accreditation	Notes	Presented credentials	Ref
Parliamentary Republic (1891–1925)
Carl Hultgren	1 April 1918 – 1925	Envoy	Resident in Buenos Aires			
Presidential Republic (1925–1973)
Einar Ekstrand	1925–1931	Envoy	Resident in Buenos Aires			
Christian Günther	23 January 1931 – 1933	Envoy	Resident in Buenos Aires			
Einar Modig	31 December 1934 – 1939	Envoy	Resident in Buenos Aires			
Axel Paulin	1934–1942	Chargé d'affaires ad interim (Note: With the following diplomatic ranks: legation counsellor (1934–40), minister plenipotentiary (1940–42).)				
Folke Wennerberg	1942–1949	Chargé d'affaires				
Folke Wennerberg	1949–1952	Envoy				
Ulf Barck-Holst	1952–1953	Envoy				
Harry Bagge	1954 – November 1956	Envoy	Also accredited to La Paz (from 1956)			
Harry Bagge	November 1957 – 1962	Ambassador	Also accredited to La Paz			
Gustaf Bonde	1962–1965	Ambassador				
Louis De Geer	1966–1972	Ambassador				
Harald Edelstam	1972 – 11 September 1973	Ambassador				
Military dictatorship of Chile (1973–1990)
Harald Edelstam	11 September 1973 – 9 December 1973	Ambassador				
Carl-Johan Groth	9 December 1973 – 1976	Chargé d'affaires (Note: Held the diplomatic rank of embassy counselor.)				
Peder Hammarskjöld	1976–1980	Chargé d'affaires (Note: Held the diplomatic rank of minister.)				
Lars Schönander	1981–1984	Chargé d'affaires ad interim				
Håkan Wilkens	1984–1987	Chargé d'affaires				
Staffan Wrigstad	1987–1990	Chargé d'affaires				
Chilean transition to democracy (1990–present)
Staffan Wrigstad	1990–1992	Ambassador				
Madeleine Ströje-Wilkens	1992–1997	Ambassador				
Håkan Granqvist	1997–2000	Ambassador				
Arne Rodin	2000–2005	Ambassador	Also accredited to Lima			
Martin Wilkens	2005–2006	Chargé d'affaires ad interim	Also accredited to Lima			
Maria Christina Lundqvist	2006–2008	Ambassador	Also accredited to Lima			
Eva Zetterberg	2009–2014	Ambassador	Also accredited to Lima	Political appointee (non-career diplomat)		
Jakob Kiefer	2014–2018	Ambassador	Also accredited to Lima (2015–16)			
Oscar Stenström	2018–2022	Ambassador				
Tomas Wiklund	August 2022 – 15 August 2025	Ambassador	Also accredited to Lima (from 2023)			
Sofia Karlberg	2025–present	Ambassador			13 August 2025	

== Gallery ==
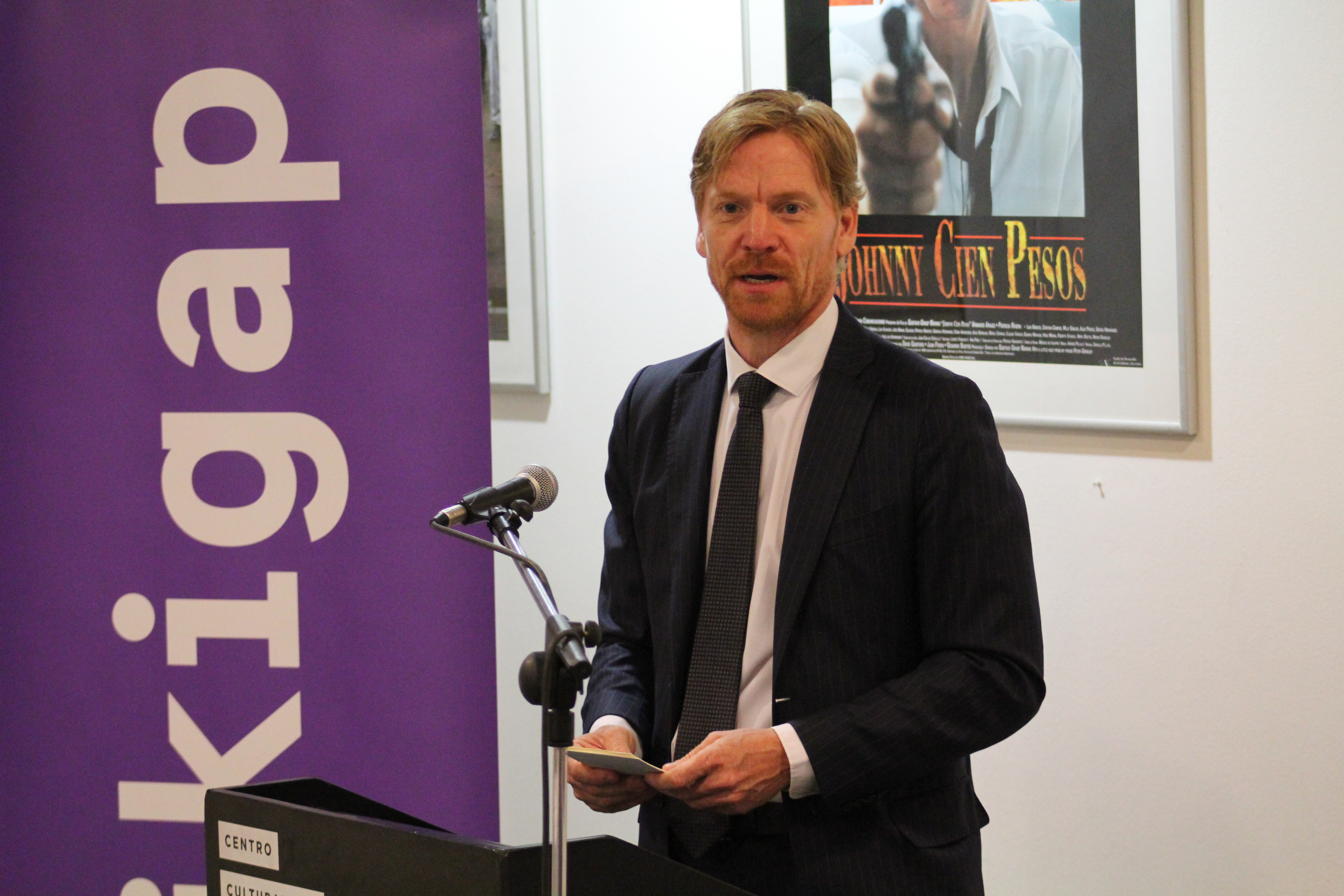
Ambassador Jakob Kiefer (2014–2018).

== See also ==
- Chile–Sweden relations
- Embassy of Sweden, Santiago
