= Gustaf Bonde (1911–1977) =

Swedish diplomat

Count Gustaf Bonde
- Born: 8 October 1911; Svalöv, Sweden
- Died: 21 September 1977 (aged 65); Stockholm, Sweden
- Other name: "Lulle"
- Education: Stockholm School of Economics
- Occupation: Diplomat
- Years active: 1937–1977
- Spouse(s): Jacqueline Barck (m. 1935; div. 1961) Elisabeth Ljunglöf (m. 1961)
- Children: 3
- Family: House of Bonde

Count Gustaf Bonde af Björnö (8 October 1911 – 21 September 1977) was a Swedish diplomat and member of the House of Bonde. Bonde began his diplomatic career in 1937 as an attaché at the Swedish Ministry for Foreign Affairs, serving in key posts including Paris, Budapest, Washington, D.C., Cairo, and Athens over nearly two decades. From 1956 to 1962, he was the Ministry’s chief of protocol and, starting in 1960, also acted as deputy introducer for foreign envoys. He then served as ambassador to several countries: Chile (1962–1965), Brazil (1966–1970), Iran (1970–1973, with additional accreditation in Afghanistan), and finally Hungary (1973–1977), where he remained until his passing.

== Early life ==
Bonde was born on 8 October 1911 at Trolleholm Castle in Svalöv Municipality, Sweden, the son of Count Gustaf Trolle-Bonde (1868–1951) and Countess Henriette Falkenberg (1883–1932). He had three older siblings, two sisters and a brother.

He became a second lieutenant in the Scanian Cavalry Regiment's (K 2) reserve in 1932 and graduated with an administrative degree (kansliexamen) in 1935. Bonde graduated from the Stockholm School of Economics in 1937.

== Career ==
Bonde became an attaché at the Ministry for Foreign Affairs in Stockholm in 1937 and served in Paris, Budapest, Washington, Cairo, and Athens between 1937 and 1956. From 1956 to 1962, he was chief of protocol at the Foreign Ministry, and from 1960, he also served as deputy introducer for foreign envoys. He was ambassador to Santiago from 1962 to 1965, Rio de Janeiro from 1966 to 1970, Tehran (with dual accreditation in Kabul) from 1970 to 1973, and then in Budapest from 1973 until his death in 1977.

== Personal life ==
In 1935 he married Countess Jacqueline Barck (1914–2009), daughter of Count Nils Barck and Juliette (née Eberlin). He married a second time in 1961 with Elisabeth Ljunglöf (1922–2006), daughter of Captain Oscar Dyrssen and Maria (née Hallin). Bonde was the father of Carl (born 1937), Nils (born 1942), and Fredrik (born 1947).

== Death ==
Bonde died on 21 September 1977 in Stockholm, Sweden, two months before his retirement.

== Awards and decorations ==
=== Swedish ===
- (Sweden) Herald of the Orders of His Majesty the King
- (Sweden) King Gustaf V's Jubilee Commemorative Medal (1948)
- (Sweden) King Gustaf VI Adolf's Commemorative Medal (1967)
- (Sweden) Commander 1st Class of the Order of the Polar Star (6 June 1973)
- (Sweden) Commander of the Order of the Polar Star (24 November 1960)
- (Sweden) Knight of the Order of the Polar Star (1957)

=== Foreign ===
- (Denmark) Commander 1st Class of the Order of the Dannebrog
- Commander 1st Class of the Order of the White Rose of Finland
- Commander 1st Class of the Order of the Lion of Finland
- (Norway) Commander with Star of the Order of St. Olav (1 July 1959)
- (Chile) Grand Cross of the Order of Merit
- (Belgium) Grand Officer of the Order of Leopold II
- (Netherlands) Grand Officer of the Order of Orange-Nassau (18 May 1957)
- (Iceland) Grand Knight's Cross with Star of the Order of the Falcon (27 June 1957)
- (Italy) 2nd Class / Grand Officer of the Order of Merit of the Italian Republic (22 November 1958)
- (Austria) Grand Decoration of Honour in Silver with Star (1958)
- (Argentina) Grand Officer of the Order of May (1957)
- (Iran) Grand Officer of the Order of the Crown
- (Thailand) Grand Officer of the Order of the Crown of Siam
- (Lebanon) Grand Officer of the National Order of the Cedar
- Grand Officer of the Order of the Sun of Peru
- (Egypt) Commander of the Order of Merit
- (France) Officer of the Order of the Black Star
- Officer of the Order of Merit of the Republic of Hungary
- (France) Knight of the Legion of Honour

Diplomatic posts
Preceded by Harry Bagge	Ambassador of Sweden to Chile; 1962–1965	Succeeded by Louis De Geer
Preceded by Jens Malling	Ambassador of Sweden to Brazil; 1966–1970	Succeeded by Bengt Odevall
Preceded by Nils-Eric Ekblad	Ambassador of Sweden to Iran; 1970–1973	Succeeded by Bengt Odhner
Preceded by Nils-Eric Ekblad	Ambassador of Sweden to Afghanistan; 1970–1973	Succeeded by Bengt Odhner
Preceded by Sigge Lilliehöök	Ambassador of Sweden to Hungary; 1973–1977	Succeeded by Torsten Hylander
