= Rosita Spencer-Churchill, Duchess of Marlborough =

British aristocrat and artist (born 1943)

Rosita, Duchess of Marlborough
- Born: Countess Dagmar Rosita Astrid Libertas Douglas; 26 September 1943 (age 83); Madrid, Spanish State
- Spouse: John Spencer-Churchill, 11th Duke of Marlborough (m. 1972; div. 2008)
- Children: 3
- Parents: Count Carl Douglas (father); Ottora Haas-Heye (mother)
- Relatives: Sophie, Hereditary Princess of Liechtenstein (niece)

Rosita, Duchess of Marlborough (born Countess Dagmar Rosita Astrid Libertas Douglas on 26 September 1943), is a British aristocrat and artist. She was the third wife of John Spencer-Churchill, 11th Duke of Marlborough.

== Early life and family ==
Rosita was born on 26 September 1943 in Madrid, Spain, the younger daughter of the Swedish nobleman and diplomat Count Carl Douglas and his wife, Ottora Maria Haas-Heye (1910–2001). At the time of her birth, her father was serving in Madrid with the Swedish Ministry for Foreign Affairs; he later became Swedish ambassador to Brazil. He belonged to the Swedish-German branch of Clan Douglas. Her mother was a daughter of the German fashion designer Otto Ludwig Haas-Heye and a granddaughter of Philipp, Prince of Eulenburg. She has three siblings: Count Gustaf Douglas, Princess Elisabeth, Duchess in Bavaria (1940–2026), and Count Philip Douglas (born 1945). Through her sister's marriage to Prince Max, Duke in Bavaria, she is an aunt and godmother of Sophie, Hereditary Princess of Liechtenstein. She is also a niece of Libertas Schulze-Boysen.

Rosita was raised in a diplomatic family and spent much of her childhood at her father's overseas postings. She spent summers at Stjärnorp Castle near Linköping, the family seat of her paternal grandfather, Lieutenant General Count Archibald Douglas. She was educated in Sweden and in Washington, D.C., and studied at Konstfack in Stockholm before attending the École nationale supérieure des arts décoratifs in Paris. While in Paris, she worked for fashion designer Emanuel Ungaro and subsequently worked as a freelance designer and interior decorator in London.

== Career ==
During her marriage, as châtelaine of Blenheim Palace, Rosita supervised the redecoration of the palace's private apartments and personally painted a number of murals.

In 1992, Rosita resumed her artistic career on a professional basis. She subsequently held solo exhibitions in London and Palm Beach, including a London exhibition of figurative paintings in 1995. Following a visit to Morocco in 1996, she produced a series of works inspired by Moroccan subjects. Her paintings and sculptures have since been exhibited in cities including London, New York, and Palm Beach. In 2006, the Elizabeth de C. Wilson Museum at the Southern Vermont Arts Center presented Rosita Marlborough: A Retrospective, which ran from 15 July to 1 September. Her work is characterised in institutional and exhibition materials as spanning painting and sculpture, with an emphasis on figurative and thematic subjects rather than adherence to a single stylistic school, and it is represented in private collections internationally.

== Personal life ==
On 20 May 1972, Rosita became the third wife of John Spencer-Churchill, 11th Duke of Marlborough. They were married in a civil ceremony at Caxton Hall with a subsequent religious blessing at St Mary's Church, Charlbury. Marlborough had inherited his father's titles and estates two months earlier. They had three children:

- Lord Richard Spencer-Churchill (13 August 1973 – 25 December 1973)
- Lord Edward Albert Charles Spencer-Churchill (born 1974); he married Kimberly Hammerstroem in 2018.
- Lady Alexandra Elizabeth Spencer-Churchill (born 1977)

The Duke and Duchess of Marlborough divorced in 2008. Since her divorce, she has been styled 'Rosita, Duchess of Marlborough' by courtesy.
