= List of ambassadors of Sweden to Palau =

Ambassador of Sweden to Palau
- Lesser coat of arms of the Kingdom of Sweden

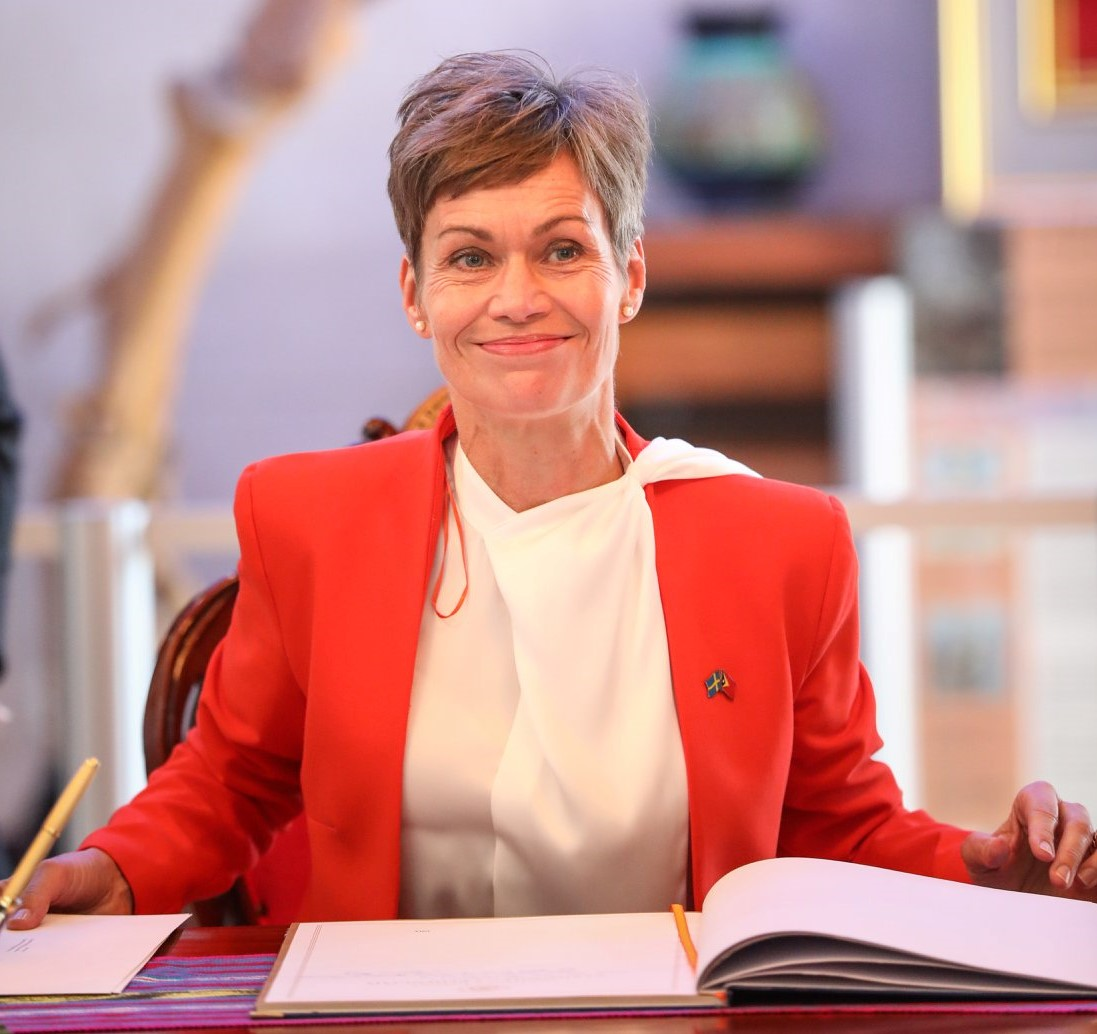
- Incumbent; Marina Berg since 2025
- Ministry for Foreign Affairs
- Style: His or Her Excellency (formal); Mr. or Madam Ambassador (informal)
- Reports to: Minister for Foreign Affairs
- Seat: Stockholm, Sweden (Note: Since 2025, the Swedish ambassador to Palau is based in Stockholm, Sweden.)
- Appointer: Government of Sweden
- Term length: No fixed term
- Inaugural holder: Christofer Gyllenstierna
- Formation: 1995

The Ambassador of Sweden to Palau (known formally as the Ambassador of the Kingdom of Sweden to the Republic of Palau) is the official representative of the government of Sweden to the president of Palau and government of Palau. Since Sweden does not have an embassy in Ngerulmud, Sweden's ambassador to Palau is based in Stockholm, Sweden.

== History ==
The Swedish government decided on 6 July 1995 to enter into an agreement on the establishment of diplomatic relations with Palau through an exchange of notes. The agreement was signed in Manila on 27 July 1995 and in Koror on 9 August 1995. The agreement entered into force on 9 August 1995.

In 1995, a Swedish ambassador was accredited for the first time in the capital of Palau, Ngerulmud. Between 1995 and 2008, Sweden's ambassador in Manila was concurrently accredited to Ngerulmud. After the Swedish embassy in Manila closed in 2008, accreditation for Palau was transferred to the Swedish ambassador in Tokyo.

As of 2025, the post of Swedish ambassador to Palau is held by a Stockholm-based ambassador-at-large, who is also ambassador to 10 other countries in Oceania.

== List of representatives ==
Name	Period	Title	Notes	Presented credentials	Ref
Christofer Gyllenstierna	1995–1996	Ambassador	Resident in Manila.		
Bo Eriksson	1996–1999	Ambassador	Resident in Manila.		
Ulf Håkansson	2000–2003	Ambassador	Resident in Manila.		
Annika Markovic	2003–2007	Ambassador	Resident in Manila.		
Inger Ultvedt	2007–2008	Ambassador	Resident in Manila.		
Stefan Noreén	2008–2011	Ambassador	Resident in Tokyo		
Lars Vargö	2011–2014	Ambassador	Resident in Tokyo		
Magnus Robach	2014–2019	Ambassador	Resident in Tokyo	14 December 2015	
Pereric Högberg	2019–2024	Ambassador	Resident in Tokyo	22 February 2022	
Marina Berg	2025–present	Ambassador	Resident in Stockholm		
