= Jens Malling =

Swedish diplomat (1909–1969)

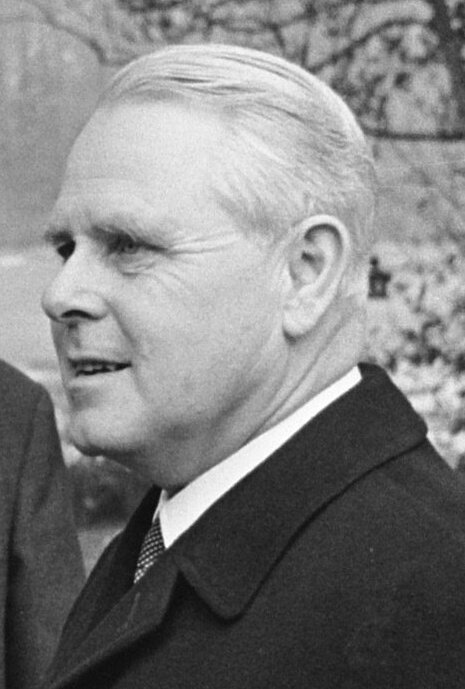
- Malling as Ambassador of Sweden to the Netherlands in 1966
- Born: Jens Henrik Peder Arnold Malling; 11 April 1909; Stockholm, Sweden
- Died: 25 January 1969 (aged 59); The Hague, Netherlands
- Education: Lund University
- Occupation: Diplomat
- Years active: 1938–1969

Jens Henrik Peder Arnold Malling (11 April 1909 – 25 January 1969) was a Swedish diplomat whose career spanned over three decades and took him to key postings around the world. After joining the Ministry for Foreign Affairs in 1938, he served in Rome, Chicago, and Washington, D.C., before moving on to positions in New York City and Stockholm during the Second World War.

Post-war, Malling held senior consular and diplomatic roles in Hamburg, Vienna, Tel Aviv, and as a mediator in Korea under the Neutral Nations Supervisory Commission. He was appointed envoy to Israel in 1956, followed by ambassadorships in Jakarta, Manila, Kuala Lumpur, Rio de Janeiro, and The Hague. He also represented Sweden at the United Nations and worked with UN technical assistance programs in Iraq.

Known for his warm personality and diplomatic skill, Malling played a role in strengthening Sweden's international relationships, particularly in Brazil, where he served as honorary chairman of the Swedish-Brazilian Chamber of Commerce. His career was cut short by his death in 1969 while serving as ambassador to the Netherlands.

== Early life ==
Malling was born on 11 April 1909 in Stockholm, Sweden, the son of Lieutenant Colonel Henrik Malling and his wife Ingrid (née Asklund). He passed studentexamen in Lund in 1928 and received a Bachelor of Arts in 1932, a Politices Magister (MA in political science) degree in 1938 and a Candidate of Law degree in 1938.

== Career ==
Malling became an attaché at the Ministry for Foreign Affairs in 1938 and served in Rome the same year and in Chicago in 1939 and in Washington, D.C. in 1940. Malling was acting second vice consul in New York City in 1943 and second secretary at the Foreign Ministry in Stockholm in 1944.

Malling was first vice consul in Hamburg in 1946 and first legation secretary and chargé d'affaires ad interim in Vienna in 1946. He served as first secretary at the Foreign Ministry in Stockholm in 1948 and was secretary in the Committee on Foreign Affairs in 1950. Malling was then legation counselor and chargé d'affaires in Tel Aviv in 1953 and mediator at the Neutral Nations Supervisory Commission in Korea in 1955.

Malling was appointed envoy in Tel Aviv in 1956 and was ambassador in Jakarta and non-resident ambassador in Manila from 1956 to 1959 as well as non-resident ambassador in Kuala Lumpur from 1958 to 1959. He was then minister at the UN delegation in New York City in 1959 and resident at the representation of UN's technical assistance operations in Iraq from 1959 to 1961. Malling succeeded Carl Douglas as ambassador in Rio de Janeiro in 1961 after Douglas had died in a car accident there on 21 January. He became honorary chairman of the Swedish-Brazilian Chamber of Commerce in 1961. Malling stayed as ambassador there until 1965 before becoming ambassador in The Hague in 1966.

== Personal life ==
Malling had been described by Jan Mårtenson as being a "chubby, white-haired and blue-eyed bachelor, jovial and humorous, a little of an aging cherub".

== Death and funeral ==
Malling died on 25 January 1969 in a hospital in The Hague. He had surgery for a thrombosis and complications arose after the procedure. On 30 January 1969, Jens Malling was honored with a Dutch state funeral. Central The Hague was closed to traffic for an hour as the cortege made its way to the Walloon Church, where a Swedish service was held by Seamen's Pastor Anders Blomstrand. The ceremony began in the morning with Queen Juliana's adjutant laying a wreath on the Swedish-flag-draped coffin, in the Queen's absence. The procession featured a hearse drawn by four horses, wreaths from King Gustaf VI Adolf, Queen Juliana, and the Dutch government, and a military honor guard of 800 personnel from the navy, army, and air force, accompanied by two military bands.

Ambassador Malling's 90-year-old mother rode closest to the coffin, flanked by Dutch Prime Minister Piet de Jong and Nordic and British ambassadors. Sweden was represented by Baron Johan Beck-Friis and other senior officials. Pastor Blomstrand preached from Paul's First Epistle, and Deputy State Secretary for Foreign Affairs Göran Ryding praised Malling's 30 years of service in the Swedish foreign ministry. After the church ceremony, the coffin was taken to the Ockenburg crematorium, where honors continued with a salute and the Swedish national anthem. Baron Beck-Friis expressed Sweden's gratitude for the tributes. Malling had been due to take up the post of Swedish ambassador to Brussels in a few months.

Malling was interred on 22 March 1969 at the Northern Cemetery in Lund, Sweden.

== Awards and decorations ==
- (Sweden) Commander of the Order of the Polar Star (6 June 1966)
- (Sweden) Knight of the Order of the Polar Star (1957)
- Commander of the Order of Merit of Argentina (Orden Al Mérito)
- (Brazil) Commander of the Order of the Southern Cross
- (Norway) Commander of the Order of St. Olav (1 July 1953)
- (Italy) Second Class of the Order of the Star of Italian Solidarity
- (Spain) Officer of the Order of Civil Merit
- (Mexico) Knight of the Order of the Aztec Eagle (21 March 1950)

Diplomatic posts
Preceded by None	Envoy of Sweden to Israel; 1956–1956	Succeeded by Östen Lundborg
Preceded by Malte Pripp	Envoy/Ambassador of Sweden to Indonesia; 1956–1959	Succeeded by Tord Göransson
Preceded by Malte Pripp	Envoy/Ambassador of Sweden to the Philippines; 1956–1959	Succeeded by Tord Göransson
Preceded by None	Envoy of Sweden to Malaysia; 1958–1959	Succeeded by Tord Göransson
Preceded by Carl Douglas	Ambassador of Sweden to Brazil; 1961–1965	Succeeded by Gustaf Bonde
Preceded by Brynolf Eng	Ambassador of Sweden to the Netherlands; 1966–1969	Succeeded by Karl-Gustav Lagerfelt
