= Gustaf Douglas =

Swedish politician (1938–2023)

- Born: Gustaf Archibald Siegwart Douglas; 3 March 1938; Stockholm, Sweden
- Died: 3 May 2023 (aged 85)
- Spouse: Elisabeth von Essen (m. 1963)
- Children: 2
- Father: Carl Douglas

Gustaf Archibald Siegwart Douglas (3 March 1938 – 3 May 2023) was a Swedish aristocrat, billionaire businessman, and politician. In August 2022, his net worth was estimated at US$7.2 billion. In 2007 he became a member of the Royal Swedish Academy of Engineering Sciences.

== Biography ==
=== Early life and background ===
Gustaf Archibald Siegwart Douglas was the oldest son of Carl Douglas (1908–1961), a Swedish nobleman and diplomat who was the Swedish Ambassador to Brazil, and his Prussian wife Ottora Maria Haas-Heye (1910–2001). He had two younger sisters. The older is Elisabeth Douglas (1940–2026), who married Prince Max, Duke in Bavaria (brother and heir to the Bavarian and Jacobite pretender Franz, Duke of Bavaria) and had five daughters including Sophie, Hereditary Princess of Liechtenstein. The younger sister is Rosita Douglas (b. 1943), who was the 11th Duke of Marlborough's third wife and mother to his three youngest children, though the eldest died as an infant.

His patriline is Scottish, of the Swedish-German branch, descended via two obscure generations, from the youngest son of James Douglas, 1st Lord Dalkeith, ancestor of the 15th century Earls of Morton. All these Douglases were of the Morton branch of the ancient Douglas family. The Douglas family was introduced in the 17th century at Riddarhuset under number 19 among families of comital status. Gustaf Douglas later served on the board of Riddarhuset.

His maternal great-grandfather was Philipp, Prince of Eulenburg (1847–1921), a friend of Wilhelm II, whose youngest child Viktoria Ada Astrid Agnes Gräfin zu Eulenburg (1886–1967) married in 1909 (divorced 1921) Professor Otto Ludwig Haas-Heye (1879–1959), and had issue, including two daughters. Gustaf descended through both his mother and father from medieval Scandinavian nobility and rulers.

=== Career ===
After an MBA from Harvard Business School in 1964, he worked in Sweden and was CEO of the newspapers Dagens Nyheter and Expressen between 1973 and 1980. After that he founded his company Investment AB Latour in 1984, through which he controlled security firm Securitas AB, the lock producer Assa Abloy and more. He formed a partnership with fellow businessman Melker Schörling, who also controls a significant amount of Securitas shares and serves as the company's chairman. He is the eleventh wealthiest person in Sweden, according to Forbes magazine, with an estimated net worth of around US$3.2 billion as of March 2013.

In 2001 Douglas was elected to the board of the Moderate Party. He has a long history of political involvement, having campaigned in his teens for what was the predecessor of the Moderates. Douglas was, however, for a time active within the Liberal People's Party. He was later known as a rather Conservative Moderate with a big interest in education policy.

== Philately ==
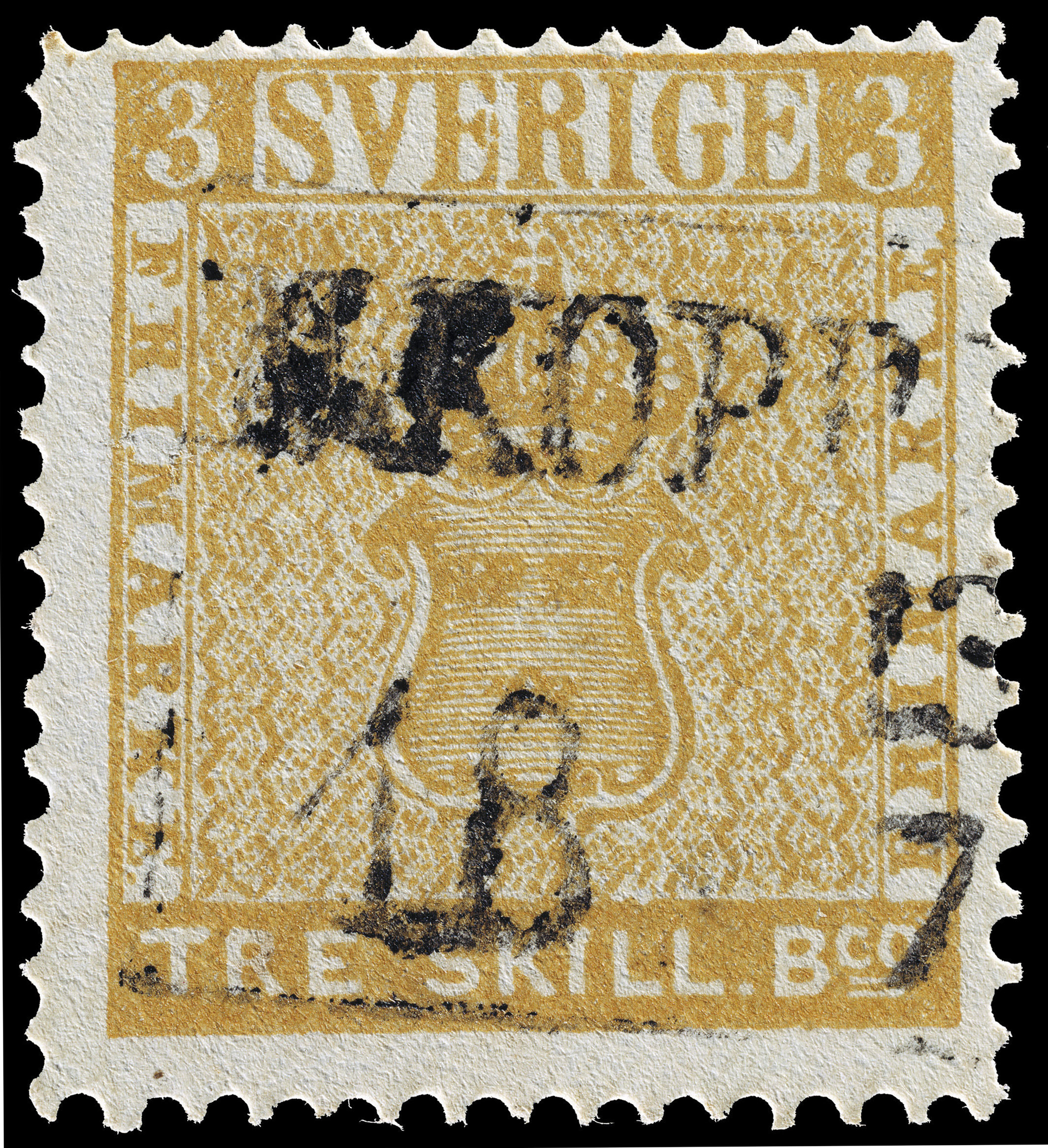
The Treskilling Yellow stamp

In May 2013, Douglas acquired the only known example of the 1855 Treskilling Yellow postage stamp, the rarest in the world with only one example known, in a private sale.

Douglas a fellow of the Royal Philatelic Society London (FRPSL) and in 2018 was appointed to the Roll of Distinguished Philatelists.

== Personal life and death ==
In 1963, he married Elisabeth von Essen, the daughter of Baron Eric von Essen and Louise (née Tamm). Gustaf and Elisabeth Douglas had two children. Both serve at different positions within the family group of companies. The Douglas family lived at Rydboholm Castle outside Åkersberga. One of his younger sisters is Rosita Spencer-Churchill, Duchess of Marlborough third (and former) wife of John Spencer-Churchill, 11th Duke of Marlborough. Gustaf’s other sister, Princess Elisabeth, Duchess in Bavaria was married to Prince Max, Duke in Bavaria and their daughter Sophie is the current Hereditary Princess of Liechtenstein.

Gustaf Douglas died on 3 May 2023, at the age of 85.

== Ancestry ==
Ancestors of Gustaf Douglas

8. Count Ludwig Wilhelm Douglas
4. Count Wilhelm Archibald Douglas
9. Countess Anna Louise Ehrensvärd
2. Carl Ludwig Douglas
10. Prof. Dr. Salomon Eberhard Henschen
5. Astri Henschen
11. Gerda Maria Sandell
1. Gustaf Douglas
12. Dr. Hermann Julius Haas
6. Prof. Otto Ludwig Haas-Heye
13. Hermanna Heye
3. Ottora Maria Haas-Heye
14. Philip, Prince of Eulenburg and Hertefeld
7. Countess Viktoria Ada of Eulenburg and Hertefeld
15. Augusta Sandels
