= Louis De Geer (1910–1987) =

Swedish diplomat (1910–1987)

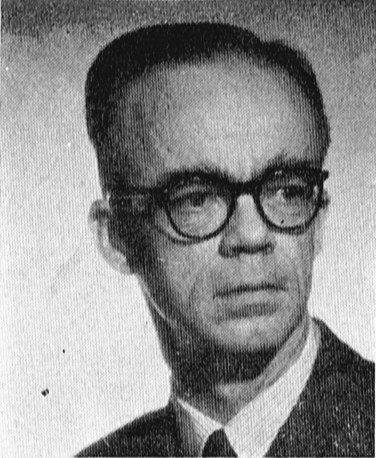
- Born: Louis Carl De Geer; 24 January 1910; Norra Strö, Sweden
- Died: 22 March 1987 (aged 77); Färlöv, Sweden
- Education: Lund University
- Occupation: Diplomat
- Years active: 1934–1975
- Spouse(s): Ulrika Wallberg (m. 1937–1952) Ulla Gustafsson (m. 1952)
- Children: 5, including Carl Johan De Geer
- Relatives: Louis De Geer (grandfather); Louis De Geer (great-grandfather)

Louis Carl De Geer af Finspång (24 January 1910 – 22 March 1987) was a Swedish diplomat. De Geer had a long diplomatic career, beginning in 1934 as an attaché at the Ministry for Foreign Affairs with early postings in the Baltic states, Oslo, London, and Montreal. He advanced through various roles, serving as second and first secretary in multiple European legations before becoming a director at the Foreign Ministry in 1952. His career then shifted towards consular positions, with appointments in New York City, Houston, and Antwerp, where he also chaired the Merchant Fleet Welfare Commission for Belgium. In 1962, he was appointed ambassador to Jakarta, Manila, and Kuala Lumpur, followed by an ambassadorship in Santiago in 1966. His final posting was as consul general in Istanbul from 1972 to 1975.

== Early life ==
De Geer was born on 24 January 1910 at the Lilla Strö estate in Norra Strö Parish, Kristianstad Municipality, Sweden. He was the son of Baron Arvid De Geer and his wife Brita (née von Dardel) and belonged to the baronial family De Geer af Finspång.

He was the brother of diplomat Carl De Geer and Yvonne De Geer, who was married to Colonel and courtier Bengt Colliander. His grandfather, Louis De Geer (1854–1935), served as Sweden’s Prime Minister from 1920 to 1921, while his great-grandfather, Louis De Geer (1818–1896), was Sweden’s first Prime Minister (1876–1880). His great-great-grandfather was Chamberlain Gerhard De Geer. He was also a cousin of the artist Willem De Geer and the uncle of businessman Gerard De Geer.

De Geer completed his studentexamen (upper secondary school diploma) in Kristianstad in 1928 and earned a Candidate of Law degree from Lund University in 1934.

== Career ==
De Geer began his diplomatic career in 1934 as an attaché at the Ministry for Foreign Affairs, serving in Riga, Tallinn, and Kaunas that same year. He was then posted to Oslo and London in 1936, followed by Montreal in 1937. In 1939, he became second secretary at the legation in Copenhagen before transferring to Bern in 1942. He was appointed first secretary at the Foreign Ministry in 1944 and later served as first secretary at the legations in Brussels (1946) and Warsaw (1949). In 1952, he became a director (byråchef) at the Foreign Ministry, and the following year, he was appointed consul in New York City. He continued his consular career in Houston in 1958 before becoming consul general in Antwerp in 1959. That same year, he also became chairman of the Merchant Fleet Welfare Commission for Belgium.

In 1962, De Geer was appointed ambassador to Jakarta, Manila, and Kuala Lumpur. He became ambassador to Santiago in 1966 and later served as consul general in Istanbul from 1972 to 1975.

== Personal life ==
De Geer was married to Ulrika Wallberg (1918–1997) in his first marriage from 1937 to 1952. In 1952, he married Ulla Gustafsson (1924–2007), the daughter of engineer Valfrid Gustafsson and Ellen (née Magnusson). From his first marriage, he had three children: Carl Johan (born 1938), Caroline (born 1940), and Louis (born 1943). In his second marriage, he had two sons: Mikael (born 1955) and Stefan (born 1956).

== Death ==
De Geer died on 22 March 1987 in Färlöv, Sweden. The funeral service took place on 10 April 1987 at Kviinge Church in Östra Göinge Municipality. He was laid to rest on 2 May 1987 at Kviinge Cemetery.

== Awards and decorations ==
- (Sweden) Knight of the Order of the Polar Star
- (Belgium) Officer of the Order of the Crown
- (Denmark) Knight of the Order of the Dannebrog
- (Netherlands) Officer of the Order of Orange-Nassau
- (Latvia) Knight of the Order of the Three Stars

Diplomatic posts
Preceded by John Setterwall	Consul General of Sweden to Antwerp; 1959–1962	Succeeded by Olof Ripa
Preceded by Tord Göransson	Ambassador of Sweden to Indonesia; 1962–1966	Succeeded by Harald Edelstam
Preceded by Tord Göransson	Ambassador of Sweden to the Philippines; 1962–1966	Succeeded by Harald Edelstam
Preceded by Tord Göransson	Ambassador of Sweden to Malaysia; 1962–1964	Succeeded by Åke Sjölin
Preceded by Gustaf Bonde	Ambassador of Sweden to Chile; 1966–1972	Succeeded by Harald Edelstam
Preceded by Pierre Bothén	Consul General of Sweden to Istanbul; 1972–1975	Succeeded by Vacant
