= List of ambassadors of Sweden to Malaysia =

Ambassador of Sweden to Malaysia
- Lesser coat of arms of the Kingdom of Sweden

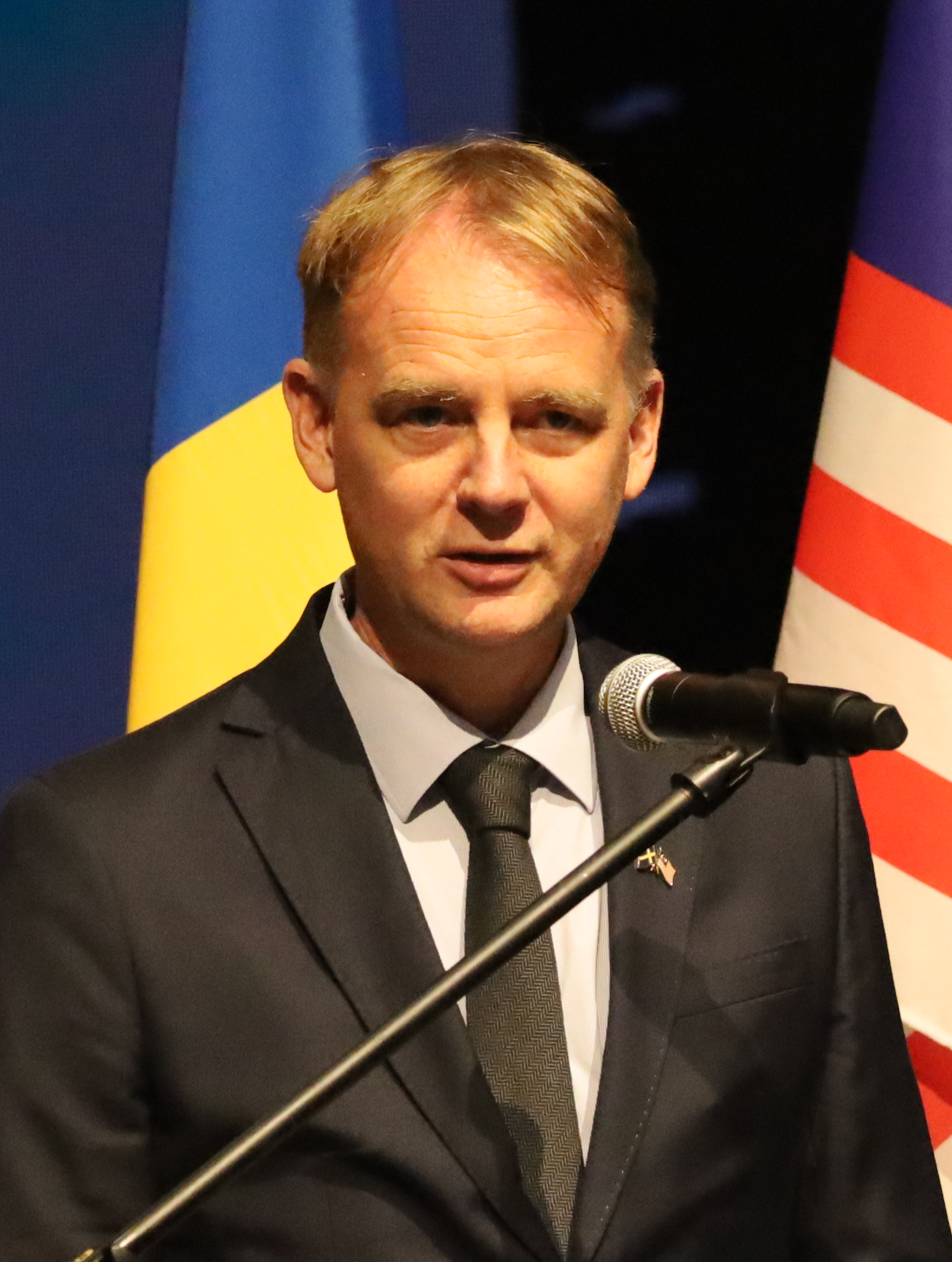
- Incumbent; Niklas Wiberg since 2024
- Ministry for Foreign Affairs; Swedish Embassy, Kuala Lumpur
- Style: His or Her Excellency (formal); Mr. or Madam Ambassador (informal)
- Reports to: Minister for Foreign Affairs
- Seat: Kuala Lumpur, Malaysia
- Appointer: Government of Sweden
- Term length: No fixed term
- Inaugural holder: Jens Malling
- Formation: November 1958
- Website: Swedish Embassy, Kuala Lumpur

The Ambassador of Sweden to Malaysia (known formally as the Ambassador of the Kingdom of Sweden to Malaysia) is the official representative of the government of Sweden to the monarch and government of Malaysia.

== History ==
In November 1958, Sweden's ambassador in Jakarta, Jens Malling, was appointed as an envoy extraordinaire and minister plenipotentiary, also serving as an envoy to Kuala Lumpur, the Federation of Malaya. This made him Sweden's first envoy to Kuala Lumpur. In February 1959, Malling presented his credentials to the King of Malaysia, Abdul Rahman of Negeri Sembilan.

In January 1969, the Swedish government announced its intention to open an embassy in Kuala Lumpur, with a chargé d'affaires who would report to the Swedish ambassador in Bangkok. In June of that year, First Embassy Secretary Arnold Willén was appointed chargé d'affaires. The embassy opened on 10 October 1969. The head of mission was Count Axel Lewenhaupt, who also served as Sweden's ambassador to Thailand. In Lewenhaupt's absence, the embassy was to be managed by a chargé d’affaires ad interim.

In 1976, Sweden appointed its first resident ambassador to Kuala Lumpur.

== List of representatives ==
Name	Period	Resident/Non resident	Title	Notes	Presented credentials	Ref
Federation of Malaya (1948–1963)
Jens Malling	November 1958 – 1959	Non-resident	Envoy	Resident in Jakarta.	February 1959	
Tord Göransson	1959–1962	Non-resident	Envoy	Resident in Jakarta.	25 August 1960	
Louis De Geer	1962–1963	Non-resident	Ambassador	Resident in Jakarta.		
Malaysia (1963–present)
Louis De Geer	1963–1964	Non-resident	Ambassador	Resident in Jakarta.		
Åke Sjölin	1964–1967	Non-resident	Ambassador	Resident in Bangkok.	28 October 1964	
Axel Lewenhaupt	1967–1970	Non-resident	Ambassador	Resident in Bangkok.		
Arnold Willén	1969–1971	Resident	Chargé d'affaires ad interim (Note: He held the following diplomatic rank: first embassy secretary)			
Eric Virgin	1970–1976	Non-resident	Ambassador	Resident in Bangkok.		
Fredrik Bergenstråhle	1971–1975	Resident	Chargé d'affaires ad interim (Note: He held the following diplomatic rank: embassy counselor)			
Arne Fältheim	1976–1981	Resident	Ambassador	Also accredited to Rangoon.		
Bengt Rösiö	1981–1985	Resident	Ambassador	Also accredited to Rangoon.		
Curt Wiik	1985–1989	Resident	Ambassador			
Wanja Tornberg	1989–1993	Resident	Ambassador			
Percy Westerlund	1993–1995	Resident	Ambassador			
Harald Fälth	1995–2001	Resident	Ambassador			
Bruno Beijer	2001–2005	Resident	Ambassador			
Helena Sångeland	2005–2010	Resident	Ambassador			
Per-Arne Hjelmborn	6 August 2010 – July 2011	Resident	Ambassador			
–	1 August 2011 – 31 August 2012	Non-resident	–	The Swedish embassy was closed.		
Bengt G Carlsson	1 September 2012 – 2016	Resident	Ambassador		20 September 2012	
Dag Juhlin-Dannfelt	September 2016 – 2021	Resident	Ambassador			
Joachim Bergström	2021–2024	Resident	Ambassador			
Niklas Wiberg	2024–present	Resident	Ambassador			

== See also ==
- Malaysia–Sweden relations
