= Christofer Gyllenstierna =

Swedish diplomat (1942–2025)

Baron Christofer Gyllenstierna
- Born: Christofer Ebbesson Gyllenstierna; 2 January 1942; Stockholm, Sweden
- Died: 3 November 2025 (aged 83); Stockholm, Sweden
- Education: Stockholm School of Economics
- Occupation: Diplomat
- Years active: 1966–2010s
- Spouse: Lis Gerrild (m. 1972)
- Children: 4
- Father: Ebbe Gyllenstierna

Baron Christofer Ebbesson Gyllenstierna af Lundholm (Note: Christofer Ebbesson Gyllenstierna was a member of the introduced noble family Gyllenstierna af Lundholm, a baronial house introduced at the Swedish House of Nobility under family number 3.) (2 January 1942 – 3 November 2025) was a Swedish diplomat. After graduating from the Stockholm School of Economics in 1966, he joined the Swedish Ministry for Foreign Affairs and went on to a long international career.

During his diplomatic service, he held postings in Tokyo, Ankara, Brussels, Copenhagen, and Paris. He served as Sweden's ambassador to the Philippines from 1993 to 1996 and was also accredited to Palau after diplomatic relations were established in 1995. From 2003 to 2007, Gyllenstierna was Sweden's ambassador to Iran during a period marked by diplomatic tensions and sensitive consular cases. He later worked as an international negotiator at the Swedish Road Administration in Borlänge until his retirement.

== Early life ==
Gyllenstierna was born into the noble family Gyllenstierna af Lundholm on 2 January 1942 in Stockholm, Sweden, the son of Baron and Colonel Ebbe Gyllenstierna (1911–2003) and his wife Eva Svennilson (1915–1966). His grandfather was Major General Göran Gyllenstierna (1876–1968), and his stepmother was the Finland-Swedish painter Else Muusfeldt (1921–1998).

In 1961, he was admitted to the Stockholm School of Economics, from which he graduated with a civilekonom degree in 1966. During his studies, he was elected chairman of the Swedish National Committee of AIESEC in 1964. He also served as chairman of the student union's international committee.

== Career ==
Gyllenstierna joined the Swedish Ministry for Foreign Affairs in 1966. He was posted as an attaché in Tokyo in 1968, became embassy secretary in Ankara in 1970, and served as a desk officer (departementssekreterare) at the Ministry for Foreign Affairs in 1973. In 1977, he was appointed first embassy secretary at the European Community (EC) delegation in Brussels, followed by a position as embassy counsellor in Copenhagen in 1981. He later served as deputy director (kansliråd) at the ministry's trade department in 1985 and as minister in Paris in 1988.

From 1993 to 1996, he served as Sweden's ambassador to the Philippines. After Sweden established diplomatic relations with Palau in 1995, he was also accredited that same year to the country's capital, Ngerulmud. In 1996, he became an inspector within the Swedish foreign service, and from 1997 to 2001 he served as director (departementsråd) and head of the Ministry of Defence's principal unit for security policy and international affairs. Between 1999 and 2001, Gyllenstierna sat on the board of the Swedish National Defence College. From 2001 to 2003, he served again as one of the inspectors of the Swedish foreign service.

From 2003 to 2007, Gyllenstierna served as Sweden's ambassador to Iran during a period marked by sensitive diplomatic and consular challenges. In 2003, he handled international attention surrounding the case of Mehdi Tayeb, an Iranian man accused of spreading HIV and facing a possible death sentence based on a religious fatwa. Gyllenstierna confirmed that the Swedish embassy was aware of the case and had received the fatwa, although Sweden chose not to intervene officially.

In 2006, he became involved in efforts concerning two Swedish construction workers, Stefan Johansson and Jari Hjortmar, who had been arrested and sentenced in Iran for allegedly photographing military installations. The Swedish embassy maintained contact with the men during their imprisonment, and following diplomatic negotiations they were eventually pardoned and released in 2007. Later that same year, during the international controversy surrounding the Muhammad cartoons, Gyllenstierna was summoned to Iran's Foreign Ministry for what he described as a "very serious" meeting. Iranian officials warned Sweden about possible consequences if Swedish newspapers published the cartoons, reflecting the growing tensions at the time between Iran and several European countries.

From 2008 until his retirement, he served as an international negotiator at the Swedish Road Administration in Borlänge.

== Personal life ==
On 20 January 1973, at Fårevejle Church in northwestern Zealand, Denmark, Gyllenstierna married Lis Gerrild (born 1942) of Copenhagen, the daughter of director Jørgen Gerrild and Dagny Gerrild. He had met his Danish wife while stationed in Tokyo. The couple had four children: Jesper (1973–1979), Morten (born 1974), Jacob (born 1978), and Eva (born 1982).

The family owned summer houses in Tisvildeleje, Denmark, and on Blidö in the Stockholm Archipelago.

Gyllenstierna was a member of Sällskapet in Stockholm, where his grandfather had served as chairman for several decades.

== Death ==
Gyllenstierna died on 3 November 2025 in Västermalm Parish in Stockholm, Sweden. He was interred on 19 December 2025 in the memorial grove at Täby Northern Cemetery in Täby kyrkby.

== Footnotes ==
Diplomatic posts
Preceded by Harald Fälth	Ambassador of Sweden to the Philippines; 1993–1996	Succeeded by Bo Eriksson
Preceded by None	Ambassador of Sweden to Palau; 1995–1996	Succeeded by Bo Eriksson
Preceded by Steen Hohwü-Christensen	Ambassador of Sweden to Iran; 2003–2007	Succeeded by Magnus Wernstedt
