= Tord Göransson =

Swedish diplomat (1910–1997)

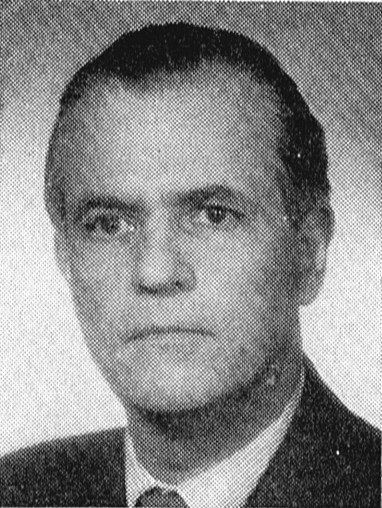
- Born: Tord Ernst Teodor Göransson; 19 February 1910; Lund, Sweden
- Died: 31 July 1997 (aged 87); Stockholm, Sweden
- Education: Stockholm University College
- Occupation: Diplomat
- Years active: 1934–1976
- Spouse: Madeleine Simonide (m. 1936)
- Children: 2

Tord Ernst Teodor Göransson (19 February 1910 – 31 July 1997) was a Swedish diplomat. Göransson began his career as an attaché at the Swedish Ministry for Foreign Affairs in 1934 and became a second secretary in 1939. He held various diplomatic positions, including postings in Rome, Oslo, and Bonn, and was appointed minister plenipotentiary in 1956. From 1959 to 1962, he served as Sweden's ambassador to Jakarta, Kuala Lumpur, and Manila, followed by a posting in Mexico City from 1962 to 1969, also covering several Central American countries. In 1968, he became the Doyen in Mexico City, and from 1969 to 1976, he served as ambassador to Brussels and Luxembourg.

== Early life ==
Göransson was born on 19 February 1910 in Lund, Sweden, the son of Chief Physician Ernst Göransson and Ingeborg (née Lindström). Göransson completed his studentexamen (upper secondary school diploma) in Stockholm in 1928 and earned a Candidate of Law degree from Stockholm University College in 1933. During his studies, he served as a librarian in the law association of Stockholm University College.

== Career ==
Göransson became an attaché at the Ministry for Foreign Affairs in Stockholm in 1934 and served in London that same year. He joined the Foreign Ministry in 1936 and was appointed second secretary in 1939 (acting since 1938). He became acting first secretary in 1940 and acting first legation secretary in Rome in 1942. In 1944, he was promoted to first secretary at the Foreign Ministry (acting since 1943), then acting director in 1946 and director (byråchef) in 1948. That same year, he was appointed counselor at the Swedish embassy in Oslo, followed by a posting in Bonn from 1952 to 1959. In 1956, he was appointed minister plenipotentiary.

He served as secretary for trade agreement negotiations with Denmark from 1937 to 1940 and with Finland in 1944. Between 1945 and 1949, he served as both secretary and delegate in trade negotiations with various countries.

From 1959 to 1962, he was Sweden's ambassador in Jakarta, as well as in Kuala Lumpur and Manila. He then served in Mexico City from 1962 to 1969, concurrently accredited to Managua, San José, and San Salvador from 1962 to 1964, and to Havana from 1964 to 1969. In July 1968, Göransson was reported to have become the new Doyen in Mexico City. He later served as ambassador in Brussels and Luxembourg from 1969 to 1976.

== Personal life ==
Göransson married Madeleine Simonide in London on 7 August 1936. They had two children: a son, born on 12 October 1938 at Stockholms Privata Förlossningshem, and a daughter, Ionica Wingfield (1944–1990).

== Death ==
Göransson died on 31 July 1997 in Stockholm, Sweden. He is buried in a family grave at the cemetery of St. John's Church in central Stockholm.

== Awards and decorations ==
- (Sweden) Commander 1st Class of the Order of the Polar Star (6 June 1968)
- (Sweden) Commander of the Order of the Polar Star (6 June 1964)
- (Sweden) Knight of the Order of the Polar Star (1950)
- (Denmark) Commander of the Order of the Dannebrog
- Commander of the Order of the Crown of Italy
- (Norway) Commander of the Order of St. Olav
- (Latvia) Officer of the Order of the Three Stars
- (Netherlands) Officer of the Order of Orange-Nassau
- (Poland) Officer of the Order of Polonia Restituta

Diplomatic posts
Preceded by Jens Malling	Ambassador of Sweden to Indonesia; 1959–1962	Succeeded by Louis De Geer
Preceded by Jens Malling	Ambassador of Sweden to the Philippines; 1959–1962	Succeeded by Louis De Geer
Preceded by Jens Malling	Envoy of Sweden to Malaysia; 1959–1962	Succeeded by Louis De Geer
Preceded by Lennart Nylander	Ambassador of Sweden to Mexico; 1962–1969	Succeeded by Carl-Henric Nauckhoff
Preceded by Lennart Nylander	Ambassador of Sweden to Guatemala; 1962–1964	Succeeded by Arne Björnberg
Preceded by Lennart Nylander	Ambassador of Sweden to Nicaragua; 1962–1969	Succeeded by Arne Björnberg
Preceded by Lennart Nylander	Ambassador of Sweden to Costa Rica; 1962–1969	Succeeded by Arne Björnberg
Preceded by Lennart Nylander	Ambassador of Sweden to El Salvador; 1962–1969	Succeeded by Arne Björnberg
Preceded by Lennart Nylander	Ambassador of Sweden to Honduras; 1962–1969	Succeeded by Arne Björnberg
Preceded by Gunnar Dryselius	Ambassador of Sweden to Cuba; 1964–1969	Succeeded by Carl-Henric Nauckhoff
Preceded by Tage Grönwall	Ambassador of Sweden to Belgium; 1969–1976	Succeeded by Lars von Celsing
Preceded by Tage Grönwall	Ambassador of Sweden to Luxembourg; 1969–1976	Succeeded by Lars von Celsing
