= List of ambassadors of Sweden to the Philippines =

Ambassador of Sweden to the Philippines
- Konungariket Sveriges ambassadör i Republiken Filippinerna; Sugo ng Kaharian ng Suwesya sa Republika ng Pilipinas
- Lesser coat of arms of the Kingdom of Sweden
- Incumbent; Anna Ferry since January 2025
- Ministry for Foreign Affairs; Swedish Embassy, Manila
- Style: His or Her Excellency (formal); Mr. or Madam Ambassador (informal)
- Reports to: Minister for Foreign Affairs
- Residence: 10 Tamarind Road, Forbes Park South, Makati
- Seat: Manila, Philippines
- Appointer: Government of Sweden
- Term length: No fixed term
- Inaugural holder: Torsten Hammarström
- Formation: 1948
- Website: Swedish Embassy, Manila

The Ambassador of Sweden to the Philippines (known formally as the Ambassador of the Kingdom of Sweden to the Republic of the Philippines) is the official representative of the government of Sweden to the president of the Philippines and government of the Philippines.

== History ==
On 17 January 1947, the King in Council decided to recognize the Republic of the Philippines as an independent and sovereign state. Sweden and the Philippines established diplomatic relations that same year. In January 1948, Sweden's envoy in Nanking, Torsten Hammarström, was also appointed as envoy to Manila. From January 1953, the Swedish minister in Jakarta was additionally accredited to Manila. In May 1958, an agreement was reached between the Swedish and Indonesian governments to elevate their respective legations to embassies. As a result, the diplomatic rank was changed from envoy extraordinary and minister plenipotentiary to ambassador. Jens Malling, who had previously served as envoy in Jakarta and Manila, was now appointed ambassador.

Sweden had been represented in Manila since the establishment of a Swedish honorary consulate on 16 November 1839. During the final decades of its existence, the honorary consulate operated under the jurisdiction of the mission in Jakarta. It was elevated to an honorary consulate general in 1955, before being closed in the early 1970s. (Note: Stig Ramqvist, CEO of Philippine Match Company Ltd. (Phimco), a company within the Match Division of the STAB Group, served as honorary consul general in Manila from 1965 to 1972. He was the last honorary consul in Manila, and the position remained vacant from 1973 onwards.)

Despite having an unpaid honorary consul general who served until the honorary consulate's closure in the early 1970s, there was a Swedish career consul (Note: Vice consul from 1963 to 1965 and from then a consul.) stationed in Manila from 1963 to 1974. Karl Bertil Eriksson became the last career consul in Manila in 1973. The following year, he was appointed chargé d'affaires and embassy counsellor. On 1 July 1980, Sweden's independent embassy in Manila became operational, and Bo Kälfors, the embassy's counselor, was appointed as Sweden's first resident ambassador.

On 9 August 1995, Sweden and Palau established diplomatic relations. From the same year, the Swedish ambassador in Manila was accredited to Palau.

The embassy was closed on 30 June 2008. The responsibility for the Philippines was then transferred to the Swedish ambassador in Bangkok, and the responsibility for Palau was transferred to the Swedish ambassador in Tokyo. Sweden's embassy in Manila was reopened on 8 November 2016. Sweden's new resident ambassador in Manila, Harald Fries, presented his credentials to President Rodrigo Duterte in December of the same year.

== List of representatives ==
Name	Period	Resident / Non-resident	Title	Resident / Concurrent accreditation	Notes	Presented credentials	Ref
Torsten Hammarström	1947–1951	Non-resident	Envoy	Resident in China. (Note: Shanghai from 1947 to 1951 and in Beijing in 1951.)			
–	1951–1952	Non-resident	Envoy		Vacant		
Malte Pripp	1953–1956	Non-resident	Envoy	Resident in Jakarta			
Jens Malling	1956 – May 1958	Non-resident	Envoy	Resident in Jakarta			
Jens Malling	May 1958 – 1959	Non-resident	Ambassador	Resident in Jakarta			
Tord Göransson	1959–1962	Non-resident	Ambassador	Resident in Jakarta		14 December 1959	
Louis De Geer	1962–1966	Non-resident	Ambassador	Resident in Jakarta			
Harald Edelstam	1966–1968	Non-resident	Ambassador	Resident in Jakarta			
Karl Henrik Andersson	1969–1973	Non-resident	Ambassador	Resident in Jakarta			
Karl Bertil Eriksson	1974–1977	Resident	Chargé d'affaires (Note: He held the following diplomatic rank: Embassy Counselor)				
Cai Melin	1974–1977	Non-resident	Ambassador	Resident in Jakarta			
Knut Granstedt	1977–1980	Non-resident	Ambassador	Resident in Jakarta			
Kjell Anneling	1977–1979	Resident	Chargé d'affaires ad interim				
Bo Kälfors	1979–1980	Resident	Chargé d'affaires ad interim				
Bo Kälfors	1980–1983	Resident	Ambassador				
Cecilia Nettelbrandt	1983–1987	Resident	Ambassador		Political appointee (non-career diplomat)		
Hans Grönwall	1987–1991	Resident	Ambassador				
Harald Fälth	1991–1993	Resident	Ambassador				
Christofer Gyllenstierna	1993–1996	Resident	Ambassador	Also accredited to Palau (from 1995)			
Bo Eriksson	1996–1999	Resident	Ambassador	Also accredited to Palau			
Ulf Håkansson	2000–2003	Resident	Ambassador	Also accredited to Palau			
Annika Markovic	2003–2007	Resident	Ambassador	Also accredited to Palau			
Inger Ultvedt	2007–2008	Resident	Ambassador	Also accredited to Palau			
Lennart Linnér	2008–2011	Non-resident	Ambassador	Resident in Bangkok			
Klas Molin	2011–2015	Non-resident	Ambassador	Resident in Bangkok		10 January 2013	
Staffan Herrström	2015–2016	Non-resident	Ambassador	Resident in Bangkok			
Harald Fries	September 2016 – August 2021	Resident	Ambassador				
Annika Thunborg	August 2021 – August 2024	Resident	Ambassador				
Harald Fries	August 2024 – January 2025	Resident	Chargé d'affaires ad interim				
Anna Ferry	January 2025 – present	Resident	Ambassador				

== See also ==
- Philippines–Sweden relations
