= Roberto Kozak =

Diplomat and humanitarian

- Born: May 14, 1942; Argentina
- Died: September 4, 2015 (aged 73); Buenos Aires, Argentina
- Occupations: diplomat, humanitarian
- Known for: saving political prisoners in Chile

Roberto Kozak (14 May 1942 – 4 September 2015) was an Argentine naturalized Chilean diplomat and humanitarian of Ukrainian descent, notable for his work to rescue people from the prisons and death squads of the Chilean military dictatorship. Kozak was a recipient of the Order of Bernardo O'Higgins with the rank Grand Cross, Chile's highest honour for non-Chilean civilians. He is called "Latin America's Schindler" for his help provided to political prisoners after the 1973 Chilean coup d'état.

== Early life and career ==
Roberto Kozak was born in Buenos Aires, Argentina. He pursued a career in international diplomacy and humanitarian work, eventually joining the Intergovernmental Committee for European Migration (ICEM), a Geneva-based organization that would later become the International Organization for Migration (IOM). In the early 1970s, he was appointed director of ICEM’s Latin American operations and established his office in Santiago, Chile.

== Role during Pinochet's dictatorship ==
After the 1973 Chilean coup d'état, led by General Augusto Pinochet, the new military regime unleashed a campaign of political repression marked by torture, disappearances, and extrajudicial killings. Kozak quickly became involved in humanitarian operations, using his diplomatic immunity and contacts to intervene on behalf of political prisoners and victims of the dictatorship. His Santiago office became a discreet but vital hub for processing exile paperwork, gathering names of the detained, and liaising with embassies and the Catholic Church to secure safe passage for those in danger.

Kozak often worked in coordination with religious figures such as Cardinal Raúl Silva Henríquez and legal advocacy groups such as the Vicariate of Solidarity, visiting prisons and interrogation centers to obtain lists of detainees. He negotiated directly with the Dirección de Inteligencia Nacional (DINA), the regime’s secret police, to secure releases. According to estimates cited by human rights groups and former detainees, Kozak played a central role in helping over 25,000 people leave Chile during the dictatorship.

== Legacy and recognition ==
Roberto Kozak’s work remained largely unknown to the general public for decades. After Chile's return to democracy in 1990, his contributions began to receive broader acknowledgment. In 1995, the government of Chile awarded him the Order of Merit, one of the country’s highest honors. In 2014, the Senate of Chile declared him a Hero of the Republic, recognizing the "moral clarity and humanitarian conviction" he exhibited during the dictatorship.

Kozak died in Madrid, Spain, in September 2015 at the age of 81. Following his death, tributes poured in from human rights advocates and former political prisoners across Latin America. Scholars and journalists have since referred to him as "the Schindler of Latin America," drawing comparisons to Oskar Schindler for his ability to save lives through moral courage and bureaucratic leverage rather than armed resistance or public protest.

== See also ==
- Harald Edelstam
- Oskar Schindler
- Raúl Silva Henríquez
