= Harald Edelstam =

Swedish diplomat (1913–1989)

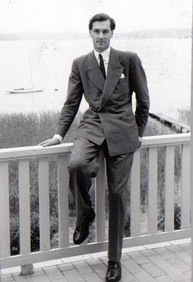
- Edelstam in 1946

Ambassador of Sweden to Algeria
- In office 1974–1979
- Preceded by: Jean-Jacques von Dardel
- Succeeded by: Stig Brattström

Ambassador of Sweden to Chile
- In office 1972–1973
- Preceded by: Louis De Geer
- Succeeded by: Vacant

Ambassador of Sweden to Guatemala
- In office 1969–1972
- Preceded by: Arne Björnberg
- Succeeded by: Claës König

Ambassador of Sweden to Indonesia
- In office 1966–1968
- Preceded by: Louis De Geer
- Succeeded by: Karl Henrik Andersson

Ambassador of Sweden to the Philippines
- In office 1966–1968
- Preceded by: Louis De Geer
- Succeeded by: Karl Henrik Andersson

Personal details
- Born: Gustav Harald Edelstam; 17 March 1913 Stockholm, Sweden
- Died: 16 April 1989 (aged 76) Stockholm, Sweden
- Spouse(s): Louise von Rosen (m. 1939–1958) Natascha Michéew (m. 1959–1963) Christine Colmain (m. 1981)
- Children: 3
- Occupation: Diplomat

Gustav Harald Edelstam (17 March 1913 – 16 April 1989) was a Swedish diplomat. During World War II he earned the nickname Svarta nejlikan ("the Black Pimpernel," a reference to the Scarlet Pimpernel) for helping hundreds of Norwegian Jews, SOE agents, and saboteurs escape from the Germans. During the early 1970s he was stationed in Santiago, Chile, and became known as the "Raoul Wallenberg of the 1970s" when he helped over 1,200 Chileans, hundreds of Cuban diplomats and civilians, and 67 Uruguayan and Bolivian refugees escape persecution by dictator Augusto Pinochet.

== Early life ==
Edelstam was born on 17 March 1913 in Stockholm, Sweden, the son of Fabian Edelstam, a courtier, and his wife Hilma Dickinson. He was the older brother of the diplomat Axel Edelstam and grandson of the lawyer, the civil servant and the politician Ernst Edelstam. Edelstam passed studentexamen in 1933 and earned a Candidate of Law degree in Stockholm in 1939 before becoming employed as an attaché at the Ministry for Foreign Affairs in Stockholm the same year.

== Career ==
Harald Edelstam served in Rome in 1939 and the Foreign Ministry in Stockholm in 1940, in Berlin in 1941, and in Oslo in 1942 where Edelstam became acting Second Vice Consul in 1944. As a diplomat in Nazi-occupied Norway, Edelstam saved the lives of hundreds of Jews and anti-Quisling freedom fighters.

He was acting Second Secretary at the Foreign Ministry in Stockholm in 1944 and was Secretary to the Minister for Foreign Affairs from 1946 to 1948. Edelstam was Second Secretary at the Foreign Ministry in Stockholm in 1946, acting First Secretary in 1948 and First Legation Secretary in The Hague in 1949 and in Warsaw in 1952. He was then First Secretary at the Foreign Ministry in Stockholm in 1953 and acting Director there in 1956. In 1958 Edelstam was sent to Vienna as Embassy Counsellor and in 1962 to Istanbul as Consul General. He stayed in Istanbul until 1965 and was thereafter ambassador in Jakarta, also accredited to Manila from 1966 to 1968. Edelstam was then sent to Central America where he was ambassador in Guatemala City, also accredited to Managua, San José, San Salvador, and Tegucigalpa from 1969 to 1972. In 1972 he was sent to Santiago de Chile as ambassador.

After the 1973 military coup against Chilean President Salvador Allende, the Cuban Embassy was under fire by tanks and Cubans were returning fire from the windows; Edelstam took a Swedish flag in hand and walked in front of the tanks as bullets hurled past. He fetched the Cubans out of the embassy and took them to the Swedish Embassy, then got them out of Chile to safety. On 13 September, the day after the evacuation, the Swedish flag was raised over the Cuban embassy and the embassy remained under Swedish protecting power for 18 years until 1991. In the months that followed, as the Pinochet regime began a campaign of torture and murder, Edelstam worked ceaselessly with embassy staff and volunteers to organize asylum for more than a thousand victims of the regime, including securing the release of at least 60 individuals from the National Stadium detention center.

The Chilean military regime did not appreciate Edelstam's engagement and finally declared him persona non grata on 4 December 1973, and he returned Stockholm accompanied by another 20 political refugees. His actions also faced resistance in the Swedish Foreign Ministry, but Prime Minister Olof Palme gave him all his support.

For helping Cubans escape from Chile, Edelstam was honored by Fidel Castro as a hero. Today, Edelstam is considered as a modern-day hero among millions around Latin America, and particularly so among the hundreds of thousands of Chileans who were forced into exile by the regime.

Edelstam came back to Stockholm and was available for the Foreign Minister during 1974 before being sent as ambassador to Algiers on the advice of Edelstam's greatest enemy, diplomat Wilhelm Wachtmeister. He left the position and retired in 1979.

== Personal life ==
Edelstam was married 1939–1958 to Countess Louise von Rosen (born 1918), the daughter of Count Hans von Rosen and Dagmar (née Wikström) and 1959–1963 to Natascha Michéew. Edelstam married a third time in 1981 with Christine Colmain. In the marriage with von Rosen he had three sons: Carl (born 1941), Hans (born 1943) and Erik (born 1946).

== Death ==
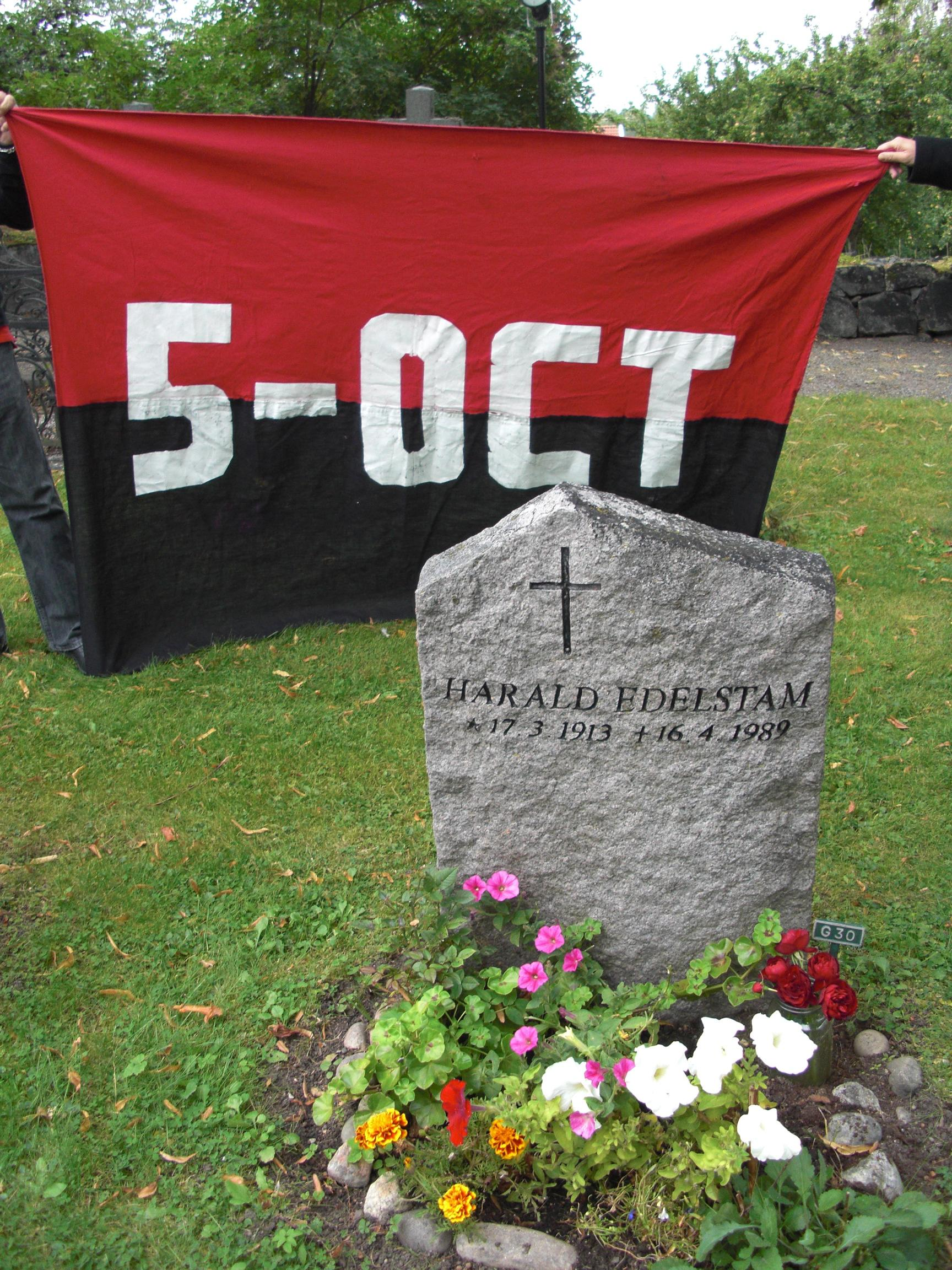
The grave of Harald Edelstam, 11 September 2010, at Ekerö Church close to Stockholm. The celebration of him helping the Chilean and others to escape during the 1973 military coup.

Edelstam died of cancer on 16 April 1989. He was interred on 7 June 1989 at Ekerö Cemetery at Ekerö Church in Ekerö Municipality, Stockholm County.

In 1993, following the restoration of Chilean democracy, Edelstam was posthumously awarded the Order of Bernardo O'Higgins. The San Miguel municipal library bears his name.

== Popular culture ==
A film about Edelstam's activities in Chile, The Black Pimpernel, was released in September 2007. He was portrayed by Michael Nyqvist.

In 2019, he was portrayed by Mikael Persbrandt in Finnish-Chilean television series Invisible Heroes, depicting his efforts with chargé d'affaires of Finland Tapani Brotherus in saving refugees from Chile during the military coup.

== Awards and decoration ==
- (Sweden) Commander of the Order of the Polar Star (17 November 1969)
- (Sweden) Knight of the Order of the Polar Star (1962)
- (Netherlands) Commander of the Order of Orange-Nassau
- Grand Decoration of Honour in Gold for Services to the Republic of Austria (1961)
- (Norway) Knight 1st Class of the Order of St. Olav
- (Denmark) Knight of the Order of the Dannebrog
- Knight of the Order of the Crown of Italy
- (Thailand) Officer of the Order of the White Elephant

== See also ==
- Edelstam Prize
- Roberto Kozak
- Raoul Wallenberg

Diplomatic posts
Preceded by Bo Alander	Consul general of Sweden in Istanbul; 1962–1965	Succeeded by Pierre Bothén
Preceded by Louis De Geer	Ambassador of Sweden to Indonesia; 1966–1968	Succeeded by Karl Henrik Andersson
Preceded by Louis De Geer	Ambassador of Sweden to the Philippines; 1966–1968	Succeeded by Karl Henrik Andersson
Preceded by Arne Björnberg	Ambassador of Sweden to Guatemala; 1969–1972	Succeeded by Claës König
Preceded by Arne Björnberg	Ambassador of Sweden to Nicaragua; 1969–1972	Succeeded by Claës König
Preceded by Arne Björnberg	Ambassador of Sweden to Costa Rica; 1969–1972	Succeeded by Claës König
Preceded by Arne Björnberg	Ambassador of Sweden to El Salvador; 1969–1972	Succeeded by Claës König
Preceded by Arne Björnberg	Ambassador of Sweden to Honduras; 1969–1972	Succeeded by Claës König
Preceded by Louis De Geer	Ambassador of Sweden to Chile; 1972–1973	Succeeded by Carl-Johan Groth
Preceded by Jean-Jacques von Dardel	Ambassador of Sweden to Algeria; 1974–1979	Succeeded by Stig Brattström
Preceded by Jean-Jacques von Dardel	Ambassador of Sweden to Mali; 1975–1979	Succeeded by Stig Brattström
