= Ebbe Gyllenstierna =

Swedish modern pentathlete

Friherre Ebbe Gyllenstierna
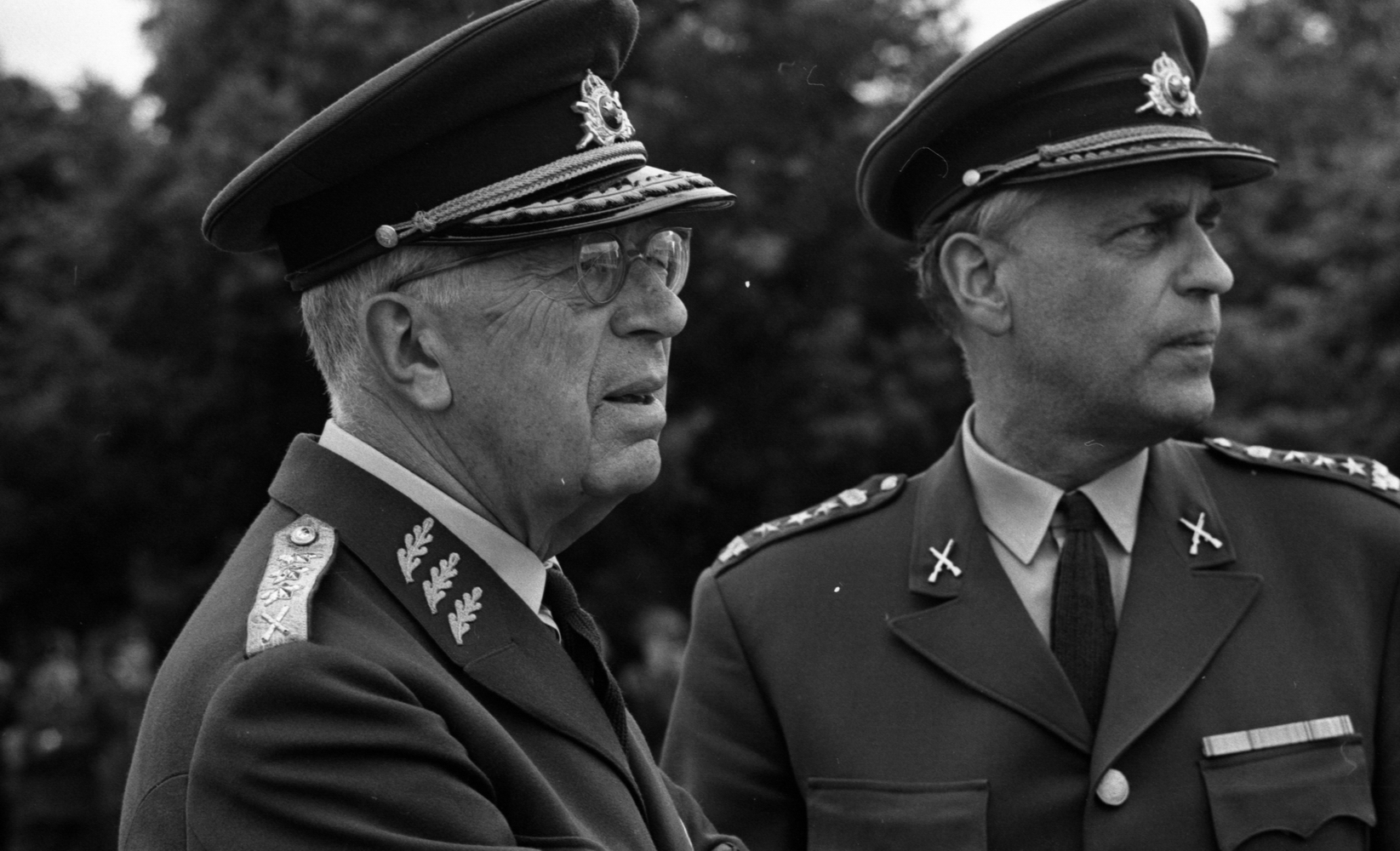
- Gyllenstierna (right) with King Gustaf VI Adolf in 1967.
- Born: 12 November 1911; Stockholm, Sweden
- Died: 14 May 2003 (aged 91); Stockholm, Sweden
- Relatives: Christofer Gyllenstierna (son)
- Military career
- Allegiance: Sweden
- Branch: Swedish Army
- Service years: 1932–1972
- Rank: Colonel
- Commands: Swedish Battalion VI, Gaza; Life Regiment Grenadiers

Ebbe Gyllenstierna
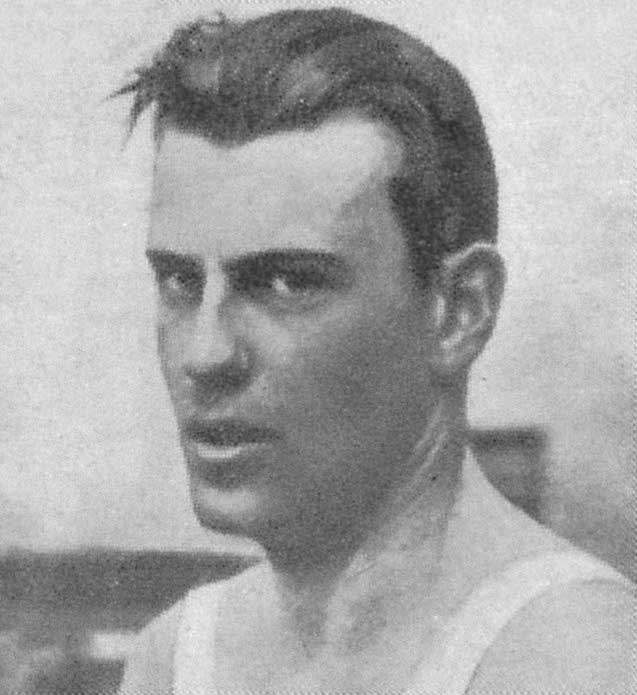

Personal information
- Born: 12 November 1911 Stockholm, Sweden
- Died: 14 May 2003 (aged 91) Stockholm, Sweden

Sport
- Sport: Modern pentathlon
- Club: K1 IF, Stockholm

Friherre Ebbe Gyllenstierna af Lundholm (12 November 1911 – 14 May 2003) was a Swedish Army officer and a modern pentathlete. He competed at the 1936 Summer Olympics and finished 16th.

== Early life ==
Gyllenstierna was born on 12 November 1911 in Stockholm, Sweden, the son of major general, friherre, Göran Gyllenstierna and his wife Anna (née Neijber).

== Career ==
He was commissioned as an officer in the Life Regiment of Horse (K 1) with the rank of fänrik in 1932. He represented Sweden in modern pentathlon in Hungary and Germany 1935-1936 and competed at the 1936 Summer Olympics. Gyllenstierna served as military attaché in Brussels from 1936 to 1937 and was promoted to ryttmästare (cavalry captain) in 1941. The same year, Gyllenstierna was promoted to captain in the Swedish Armoured Troops. In 1943, he was promoted to captain of the General Staff Corps, and he served as aide-de-camp to the Chief of Army, lieutenant general Ivar Holmquist from 1943 to 1944. Gyllenstierna then served as a general staff officer (mobilization officer) of the III Military District in 1944 and as a teacher at the Royal Swedish Army Staff College from 1945 to 1948 and from 1953 to 1957.

He was ryttmästare in the cavalry from 1948, was promoted to major in the General Staff Corps in 1952, and served on the Medical Board of the Swedish Armed Forces from 1952. Gyllenstierna was promoted to lieutenant colonel in 1955 and served as battalion commander in the Västerbotten Regiment (I 20) from 1957 and served as commanding officer of the Swedish Battalion VI in Gaza from April to October 1959. He was promoted to colonel in Västerbotten Regiment in 1960 and served as military attaché in Paris and Bern from 1960 to 1965. From 1966 until his retirement in 1972, Gyllenstierna served as regimental commander of the Life Regiment Grenadiers (I 3).

He was also a board member of the Swedish Military Sports Association (Sveriges militära idrottsförbund) from 1943 to 1944 and secretary of the Royal Patriotic Society from 1973 to 1987.

== Personal life ==
In October 1936, he married Eva Svennilson (1915–1966), the daughter of Sven Nilson, a court chaplain, and Auga (née Andersson), in Solna Church. They had three children: Nils (born 1938), Christofer (1942–2025), and Tove (born 1951). His son Christofer Gyllenstierna was a Swedish diplomat.

In 1970, he married Maj Dalén (1908–1983), the daughter of Professor Albin Dalén and Maja (née Svedin). He later married the artist Else Bengtson-Muusfeldt (1921–1998), the daughter of the shipowner Ragnar Bengtson and Elvi (née Eronet).

== Death ==
Gyllenstierna died on 14 May 2003 in Stockholm. He was interred on 29 August 2003 at Skogskyrkogården in Stockholm.

== Dates of rank ==
- 1932 – Second lieutenant
- 1936 – Lieutenant
- 1941 – Ryttmästare
- 1941 – Captain
- 1952 – Major
- 1955 – Lieutenant colonel
- 1960 – Colonel

== Awards and decorations ==
=== Swedish ===
- (Sweden) Commander of the Order of the Sword (6 June 1966)
- (Sweden) RyttOl Medal of Merit

=== Foreign ===
- (France) Commander of the Legion of Honour
- (Norway) Commander of the Order of St. Olav
- (Belgium) Knight of the Order of the Crown
- United Nations Medal

== Honours ==
- Member of the Royal Swedish Academy of War Sciences (1956)
