= Harald Fälth =

Swedish diplomat (born 1947)

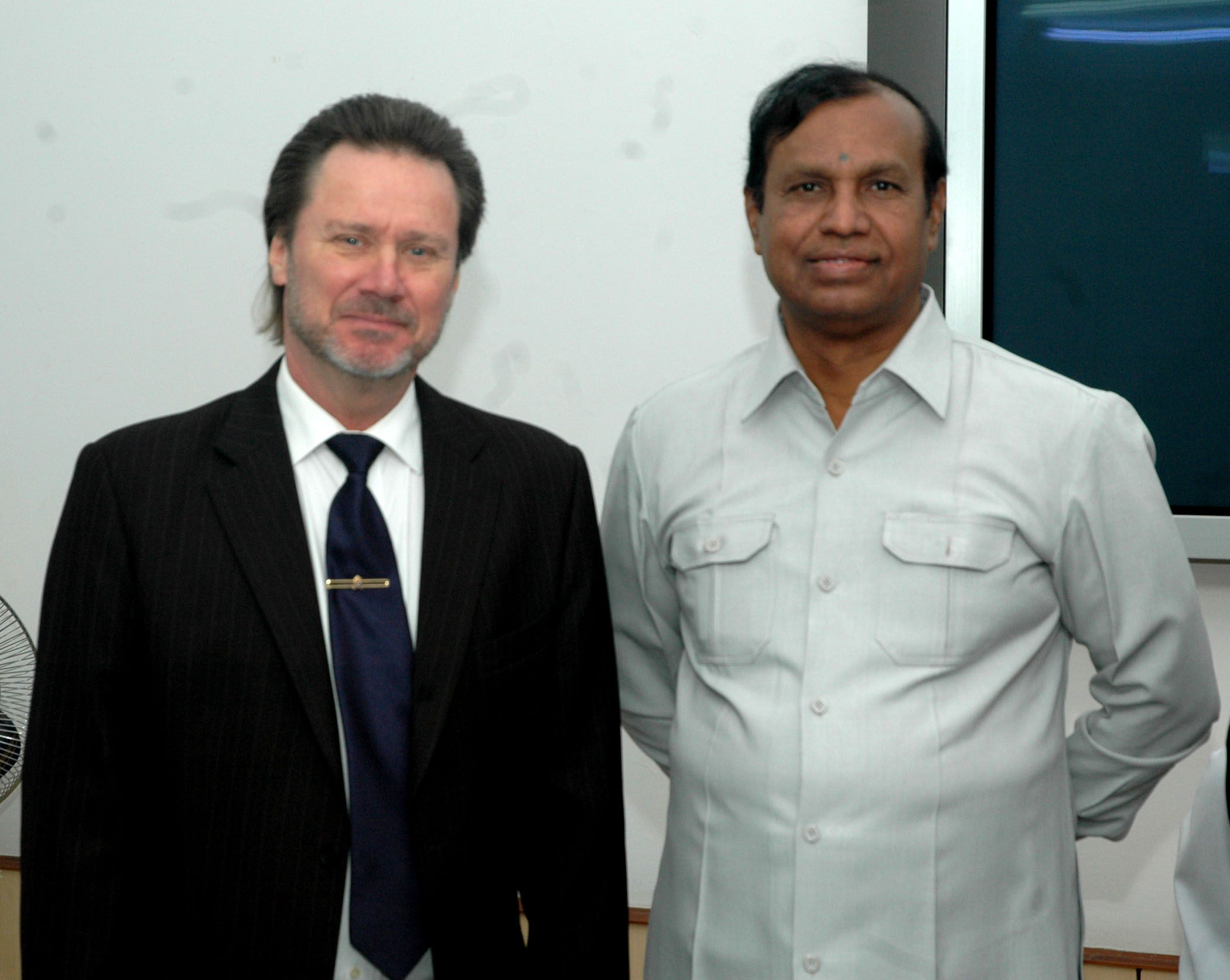
- Fälth (left) and T. R. Baalu in January 2007
- Born: Jan Harald Bertil Fälth; 8 October 1947 (age 78); Växjö, Sweden
- Education: Lund University
- Occupations: Jurist, diplomat
- Years active: 1971–2010s
- Political party: Social Democratic Party
- Spouse: Gunnel Dahlin (m. 1978)

Jan Harald Bertil Fälth (born 8 October 1947) is a Swedish jurist, diplomat, and Social Democratic politician whose career has focused on senior roles in the judiciary, central government, and the foreign service. After completing his law degree at Lund University in 1971, he worked in the Swedish court system, becoming an assessor in 1979. He then moved into government administration, including roles at the Ministry of Finance and as an investigative secretary in the Social Democratic parliamentary group.

From 1982 to 1987, he served as state secretary at the Ministry of Justice, where he also held several coordinating and oversight positions. His work included involvement in government coordination during the investigation into the assassination of Prime Minister Olof Palme. He left office in 1987 following the political fallout from the Stig Bergling escape scandal.

He then pursued a diplomatic career, serving as ambassador to Nicaragua, the Philippines, Malaysia, and the Czech Republic (with concurrent accreditation to Slovakia). He also held senior posts at the Ministry for Foreign Affairs, including Legal Department director and later head of the Secretariat for Security, Confidentiality and Preparedness, as well as the ministry's property division.

== Early life ==
Fälth was born on 8 October 1947 in Växjö Parish in Växjö, Kronoberg County, Sweden, the son of foreman Folke Fälth and his wife Brita (née Forsbeck). He received a Candidate of Law degree from Lund University in 1971.

== Career ==
Fälth completed court service training from 1971 to 1974, served as an aspirant at the Administrative Court of Appeal in Stockholm in 1974, as an extra legal clerk (fiskal) in 1975, and was appointed assessor in 1979. He worked as an expert at the Ministry of Finance/Ministry of the Budget from 1976 to 1980, served as an investigative secretary in the Social Democratic parliamentary group from 1980 to 1982, and was state secretary at the Ministry of Justice from 1982 to 1987. During the same period, he chaired the Cooperative Body for the Judicial Information System (Samarbetsorganet för rättsväsendets informationssystem, SARI) from 1982 to 1987 and was a board member of the National Swedish Tax Board from 1983 to 1987.

While serving as state secretary at the Ministry of Justice during the investigation into the assassination of Prime Minister Olof Palme, Fälth played an important coordinating role between the government, the police leadership, and the prosecution authorities. In the early stages of the investigation, he instructed ministry official Klas Bergenstrand to contact police leadership to obtain updates on the progress of the case. This helped create an informal "observer" function within the police-led coordination group, linking the Ministry of Justice to the ongoing investigation. Although never formally established, this arrangement became a key channel for continuous information exchange. Fälth acted as a central intermediary between the Ministry of Justice, the National Police Board, and the Prosecutor-General of Sweden, helping ensure the ministry remained informed and able to relay views between the relevant authorities. His role was largely informal and advisory, but it placed him close to operational discussions in a highly sensitive and politically significant investigation. He also took part in several interventions regarding the organization and direction of the inquiry, including discussions with senior prosecutorial authorities about replacing a lead prosecutor due to internal conflicts, as well as communicating government and police concerns over investigative decisions such as witness confrontation procedures. Later, amid increasing tensions between police and prosecutors, he participated in discussions on restructuring investigative responsibilities and improving inter-agency coordination, including proposals to reorganize the leadership of the preliminary investigation.

In 1987, Fälth, then a senior Swedish government official, became involved in the political fallout following the escape of convicted spy Stig Bergling. At the time, he served as state secretary under Justice Minister Sten Wickbom, making him one of the highest-ranking officials in the Ministry of Justice. Bergling's escape during a prison leave caused a major national scandal and raised serious concerns about Sweden's security and prison oversight. The political consequences were severe: several prominent officials resigned on 20 October that year, including Wickbom, senior prison officials, and Fälth himself.

Fälth was subsequently appointed ambassador to Managua, Nicaragua, with concurrent accreditation in San José, Costa Rica in 1988. His appointment within the Ministry for Foreign Affairs' development aid division by the then Social Democratic government was criticized, including by ministry staff organizations, who argued that he lacked specific expertise in development cooperation. Career diplomat Leif Leifland also criticized the appointment, calling it incomprehensible and stating that "failed politicians should not become ambassadors". The issue was also raised by Moderate Party politician Anders Björck in a question to Prime Minister Ingvar Carlsson during hearings before the Committee on the Constitution in April 1988.

He later served as ambassador in Manila from 1991 to 1993, director (departementsråd) at the Ministry for Foreign Affairs' Legal Department from 1993 to 1995, and ambassador in Kuala Lumpur from 1995 to 2001. In Malaysia, he also managed King Carl XVI Gustaf's state visit in March 1996. He served as ambassador in Prague from 2001 to 2006, with concurrent accreditation in Bratislava from 2001 to 2003. In Prague, he was among other things involved in handling the Czech Republic's potential purchase of the Saab JAS 39 Gripen.

From 2007 onward, he served as director and head of the Secretariat for Security, Confidentiality and Preparedness (Sekretariatet för säkerhet, sekretess och beredskap, SSSB) at the Ministry for Foreign Affairs. He later worked as head of the ministry's property division.

== Personal life ==
In 1978, Fälth married the secretary Gunnel Dahlin (born 1950), the daughter of the stationmaster Sven Dahlin and Elly (née Nilsson).

== Bibliography ==
- Fälth, Harald (1981). Ekonomisk brottslighet [Financial crimes]. Utredningsrapport / Socialdemokraterna; 8 (in Swedish). ISSN 0281-8140. SELIBR 537509.
- Fransson, Bill; Fälth, Harald, eds. (1982). Moderaterna i ord och gärning: rapport. Moderata hjärtefrågor: slagord och verklighet [The Moderates in word and deed: report. Moderate issues of the heart: slogans and reality] (in Swedish). Stockholm: Socialdemokraterna. SELIBR 537772.

Diplomatic posts
Preceded by Göte Magnusson	Ambassador of Sweden to Nicaragua; 1988–1991	Succeeded by Lars Jonsson
Preceded by Göte Magnusson	Ambassador of Sweden to Costa Rica; 1988–1991	Succeeded by Lars Jonsson
Preceded by Hans Grönwall	Ambassador of Sweden to the Philippines; 1991–1993	Succeeded by Christofer Gyllenstierna
Preceded by Percy Westerlund	Ambassador of Sweden to Malaysia; 1995–2001	Succeeded by Bruno Beijer
Preceded by Ingmar Karlsson	Ambassador of Sweden to the Czech Republic; 2001–2006	Succeeded by Catherine von Heidenstam
Preceded by Ingmar Karlsson	Ambassador of Sweden to Slovakia; 2001–2003	Succeeded by Cecilia Julin
