= Stjärnorp Castle =

Coordinates: 58°31′57″N 15°34′41″E

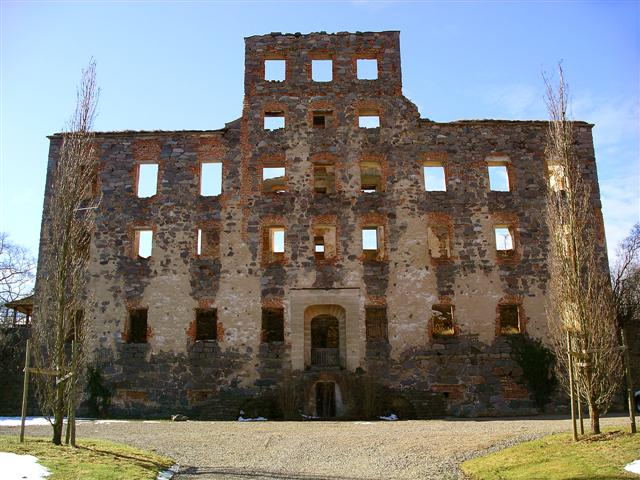
Stjärnorp Castle, main ruins

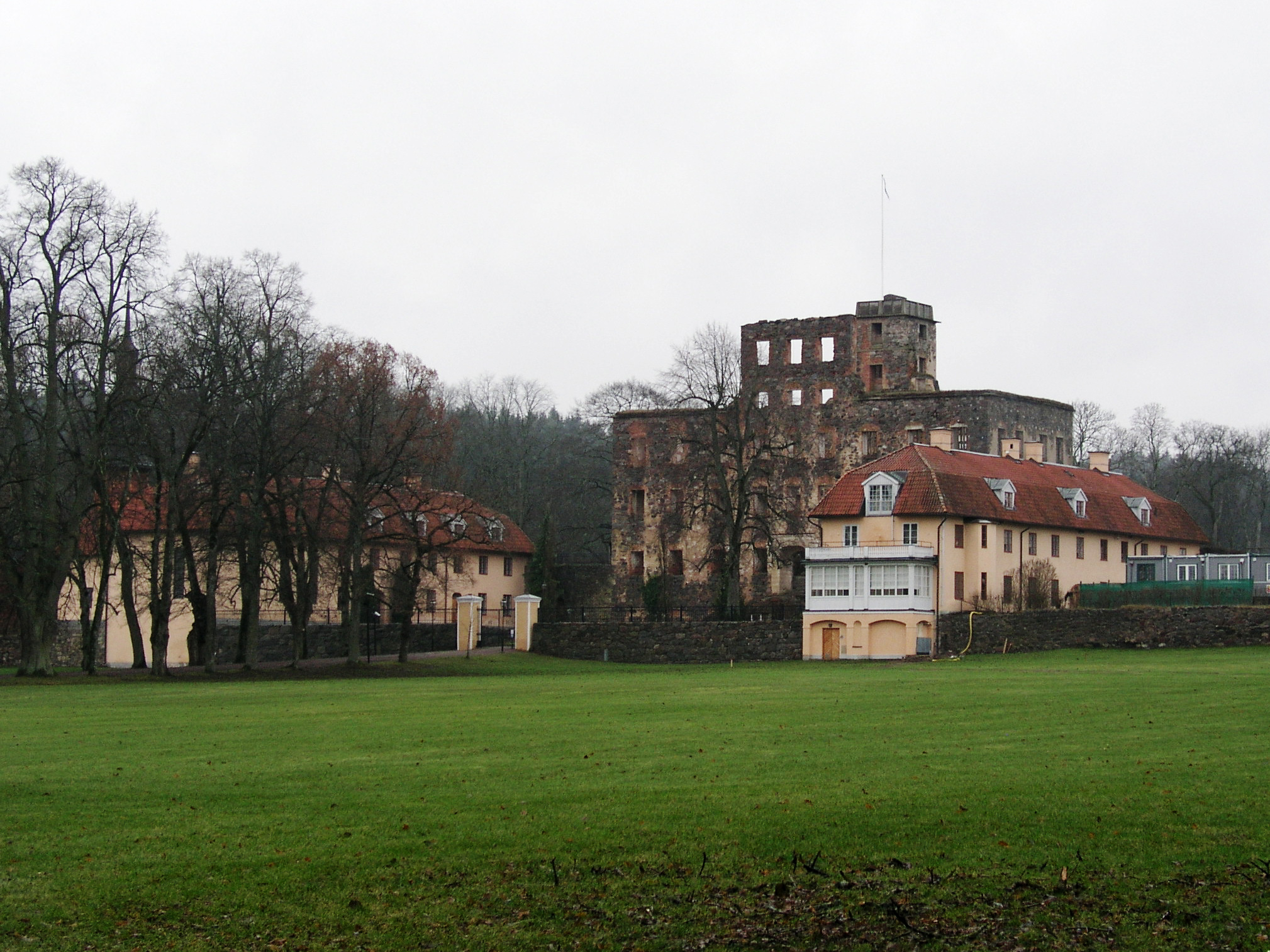
Wider view, showing 2 wing buildings.

Stjärnorp Castle (old spelling: Stiernorp or Stiernarp) is situated north of Lake Roxen just north of Linköping, in the southern province of Östergötland, Sweden. It was built by the Douglas Family, with a view over Lake Roxen.

== History ==
The castle was built in 1655–1662 by Field Marshal Robert Douglas, Count of Skenninge (1611–1662). The castle and terraces were designed by Nicodemus Tessin the Elder. According to one legend, a story relates that during the war, comrades and brothers in arms Robert Douglas and Axel Lillie came home from the Peace of Westphalia, and they had made an agreement to build their own castles, Stjärnorp Castle and Löfstad Castle, so high that from the top floor, they could see and send greeting messages to each other.

Carl Fredric Broocman, writing in the mid-18th century on "Stiernarp":

"This manor farm is well located beside Lake Roxen, 5 eighths of a mile from the church, and has a sizeable stone building of four stories, with a tower on the western side and a terrace on the roof, as it seems imitating the King's adviser, Count Er. Dahlbergs Svec. Ant. & Hod. There are 2 wings of 2 storeys besides, and a room in the southern building with altar, pulpit, organ and gallery furnished as a chapel, and in the middle of the roof is a handsome tower with a clock. In this so wonderfully arranged chapel the peasants, farmers and crofters of the woodland districts furthest from the parish church have, with the proper consent of the gentry and clergy, freedom to hold their regular worship every Sunday and holy day throughout the year. The good-sized building just named was erected by Count Robert Douglas about 1654, and Major General and Knight, Count Wilhelm Douglas is now the owner thereof."

All the Stjärnorp buildings were destroyed during a fire on May 12, 1789, but the chapel was restored in the same year. Although the wings were built up again within a few years after the fire, the funds were lacking for the repair of the main building, which is still in ruins.

When Stjärnorp parish was formed in 1810, the castle chapel became the parish church chapel.
