= Gylfe Anderberg =

Swedish diplomat (1878-1946)

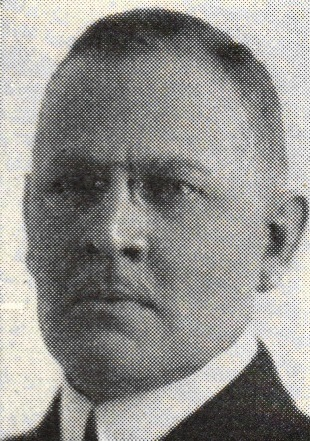
- Born: Karl Gotthard Gylfe Anderberg; 5 May 1878; Harg, Sweden
- Died: 9 February 1946 (aged 67); Tangier, Morocco
- Education: Uppsala University
- Occupation: Diplomat
- Years active: 1906–1946
- Spouse: Rosario de Carrére (m. 1920; died 1927)

Karl Gotthard Gylfe Anderberg (5 May 1878 – 9 February 1946) was a Swedish diplomat. Anderberg began his diplomatic career as an assistant clerk in the Swedish Customs Service before being appointed attaché in 1906. He served in various consular roles across Europe and North America, including as vice-consul in New York City, consul in Montreal, and consul in Chicago. He was appointed acting consul general in Mexico in 1917, a role he held until 1921, and later served as acting envoy to Mexico and Havana. From 1939 until his death in 1946, he was the acting honorary consul general in Tangier.

== Early life ==
Anderberg was born on 5 May 1878 in Harg Parish, Uppsala County, Sweden. He was the brother of the commander in the Swedish American Line, sea captain Gunnar Anderberg. He also had a sister, Gullen. He graduated with an administrative degree (kansliexamen) from Uppsala University in 1905.

== Career ==
Anderberg was an assistant clerk (kammarskrivare) in the Swedish Customs Service when he was appointed attaché (consular trainee) in October 1906. Anderberg became an attaché in Helsinki in 1906, in Hamburg later that same year, acting vice-consul in Lübeck in 1907, acting vice-consul in Hamburg that same year, and acting vice-consul in London in 1908. He also served at the consulates in Antwerp and Rouen. Anderberg served as vice-consul in New York City from 23 December 1909 to 31 December 1913.

He became acting consul in Montreal on 22 November 1912, and was the regular consul from 31 December 1913. On 11 April 1914, the Foreign Office approved Anderberg as Consul of Sweden at Montreal for British North America, with the exception of British Columbia. In the Council on 10 December 1915, the King in Council appointed and commissioned Anderberg at the Swedish consulate in Montreal as consul in Chicago from 1 January 1916.

He was appointed acting consul general and chargé d'affaires in Mexico from 23 February 1917. He became the regular consul general and chargé d'affaires there through a cabinet decision on 21 December 1917. From the fall of 1919 to the beginning of 1920, he held the position of acting consul general and chargé d'affaires in Rio de Janeiro, and was later transferred back to Mexico. He was appointed acting envoy to Mexico and Havana on 30 September 1921.

In March 1923, he was reported to the Parliamentary Ombudsman by Folke Cronholm, his predecessor in the consul general position in Mexico, who accused Anderberg of unlawfully handling cash funds entrusted to Cronholm. In February 1924, it was reported that the Parliamentary Ombudsman, after reviewing all the documents in the case, decided not to take any further action.

Anderberg served as acting envoy in Mexico and Cuba from 1921 to 1937, also in Guatemala and Panama from 1930 to 1937, and in Costa Rica, Honduras, Nicaragua, and El Salvador from 1936 to 1937. He then served as acting honorary consul general in Tangier from 1939 until his death in 1946.

== Personal life ==
On 28 November 1920, in Mexico City, Anderberg married Miss Rosario de Carrére (1893–1927), the daughter of the Spanish envoy Don Pedro de Carrére y Lembeye and his wife, née Gómez Farías.

== Death ==
Anderberg died on 9 February 1946 in Tangier, Morocco. Anderberg was buried at the English-Protestant cemetery in Tangier on 11 February 1946, in the presence of the Swedish and Hungarian communities as well as the diplomatic corps. His remains were later cremated and sent home on the Swedish Orient Line ship Boreland. The urn was interred in the family grave at Harg on 5 May of the same year.

== Awards and decorations ==
- (Sweden) Commander Grand Cross of the Order of the Polar Star (6 June 1932)
- (Sweden) Commander 1st Class of the Order of the Polar Star (23 September 1924)
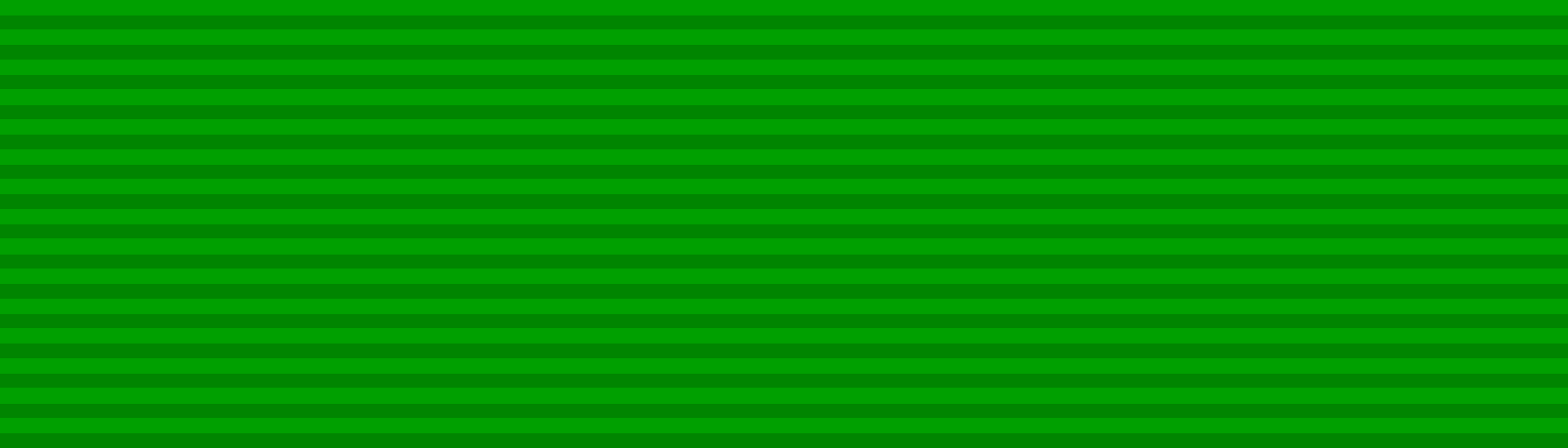
- (Sweden) Knight of the Order of Vasa (1916)
- (Mexico) Grand Cross of the Order of the Aztec Eagle
- (Hungary) Grand Cross of the Hungarian Order of Merit
- (Cuba) Grand Officer of the Order of Carlos Manuel de Céspedes

Diplomatic posts
Preceded by Einar Henrik Lindquist	Consul of Sweden to Montreal; 1913–1915	Succeeded by David Bergström
Preceded by Carl Gösta Puke	Consul of Sweden to Chicago; 1916–1917	Succeeded by Claës Bonde
Preceded by Folke Cronholm	Consul general and chargé d'affairs of Sweden to Mexico; 1917–1921	Succeeded by Himself as Envoy
Preceded by Himself as Consul general and chargé d'affairs	Envoy of Sweden to Mexico; 1921–1938	Succeeded by Vilhelm Assarsson
Preceded by None	Envoy of Sweden to Cuba; 1921–1938	Succeeded by Vilhelm Assarsson
Preceded by None	Envoy of Sweden to Guatemala; 1921–1938	Succeeded by Vilhelm Assarsson
Preceded by None	Envoy of Sweden to Panama; 1930–1938	Succeeded by Vilhelm Assarsson
Preceded by None	Envoy of Sweden to Nicaragua; 1936–1938	Succeeded by Vilhelm Assarsson
Preceded by None	Envoy of Sweden to Costa Rica; 1936–1938	Succeeded by Vilhelm Assarsson
Preceded by None	Envoy of Sweden to El Salvador; 1936–1938	Succeeded by Vilhelm Assarsson
Preceded by None	Envoy of Sweden to Honduras; 1936–1938	Succeeded by Vilhelm Assarsson
Preceded by Nils Fröberg	Honorary Consul General of Sweden to Tangier; 1939–1946	Succeeded by None
