= Vilhelm Assarsson =

Swedish diplomat (1889–1974)

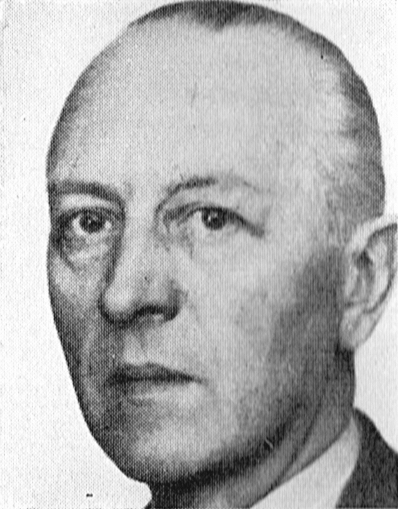
- Born: Per Vilhelm Gustaf Assarsson; 22 April 1889; Lund, Sweden
- Died: 11 October 1974 (aged 85); Stockholm, Sweden
- Burial place: Galärvarvskyrkogården
- Education: Lund University
- Occupation: Diplomat
- Years active: 1916–1955

Per Vilhelm Gustaf Assarsson (22 April 1889 – 11 October 1974) was a Swedish diplomat. Assarsson was born in Lund, Sweden, in 1889, the son of a law professor. He graduated with a law degree in 1911 and began his career as a court clerk and district judge. In 1916, he joined the Swedish Ministry for Foreign Affairs, serving as attaché in Copenhagen and Berlin. Over the years, he held key diplomatic positions, including acting legation secretary in Berlin, head of Sweden's first political bureau, and legation counsellor in Washington, D.C. He became a resident envoy to Peru in 1935, accredited to several Latin American countries, and later served in Moscow, where he was involved in trade negotiations with the Soviet Union.

In 1943, Assarsson was declared persona non grata by the Soviet Union and returned to Sweden. He was later appointed deputy state secretary for foreign affairs and played a significant role in the restoration of the Arvfurstens palats, the ministry's headquarters. He retired in 1955 after a long diplomatic career.

Assarsson remained active in business and cultural circles, joining the boards of several companies and supporting causes like flood relief efforts in Spain. A passionate collector of art and antiques, he also set a Swedish record for Grand Crosses. In 1963, he published his memoir, In the Shadow of Stalin, recounting his experiences as Sweden's envoy in Moscow.

== Early life ==
Assarsson was born on 22 April 1889, in Lund Cathedral Parish in Lund, Sweden, the son of Professor Pehr Assarsson (1838–1894) and his wife, Gustava "Gusten" Flensburg (1867–1964). His maternal grandfather was Bishop Wilhelm Flensburg, and his brother was the Catholic priest David Assarsson. He passed studentexamen in 1907 and earned a Candidate of Law degree in 1911. From 1911 to 1915, he served as a court clerk in the Torna and Bara judicial district, and from 1914 to 1915, he was acting district judge (domhavare) in the same jurisdiction.

== Career ==
=== Diplomatic career ===
Assarsson became an attaché at the Swedish Ministry for Foreign Affairs in 1916, serving in Copenhagen and Berlin the same year. In 1918, he was appointed acting legation secretary in Berlin and returned to the ministry in 1919. Between 1919 and 1923, he served as secretary of the ministry's admissions committee and was also involved in trade negotiations with Germany in 1921. That same year, he became acting head of the first political bureau (1:a politiska byrån) and later legation counsellor and head of the legal bureau (juridiska byrån). Between 1921 and 1922, he participated in Scandinavian cooperation efforts concerning economic interests in certain former warring nations.

In 1923, Assarsson was appointed legation counsellor in Washington, D.C., and in 1929, he became chargé d'affaires in Mexico City. He later served as legation counsellor in Moscow (1930) and consul in Leningrad (1931), receiving the title of consul general in 1933. In 1935, he was appointed envoy to Peru, where he was resident, and was also accredited to Bolivia, Ecuador, Colombia, and Venezuela. In 1938, he became resident envoy in Mexico, with accreditations in Costa Rica, Cuba, Guatemala, El Salvador, Honduras, Nicaragua, and Panama. Assarson became envoy to Russia in 1940 and was stationed in Moscow where he served as a delegate in Swedish-Soviet trade treaty negotiations that same year. During the early years of World War II, he experienced the conflict firsthand and participated in the diplomatic corps' evacuation to Kuybyshev.

On 17 December 1943, Assarsson was declared persona non grata. The official reason given was that the Swedish military attaché, Captain Hans Nygren, had allegedly passed Soviet military secrets to Germany. Assarsson returned to Stockholm in February 1944. The Swedish government struggled to interpret the Soviet actions, and upon his return, Assarsson was appointed deputy state secretary for foreign affairs—a position created specifically for him as a demonstration of the government's continued trust. During the first half of 1945, he intermittently served as acting state secretary for foreign affairs, as the regular state secretary, Erik Boheman, was also serving as Sweden's envoy in Paris.

Assarsson himself was convinced that his expulsion was purely a retaliatory move in response to Sweden's refusal to release and repatriate V. Sidorenko, the head of Intourist in Stockholm, who had been exposed as the leader of a Soviet spy ring. The Soviet Foreign Minister, Vyacheslav Molotov, had personally urged Assarsson, on at least three occasions to immediately release Sidorenko, whom the Soviets claimed was being tortured at Långholmen Prison and fed pig food. When the Swedish government repeatedly refused to comply with Soviet demands, Assarsson and his military attaché were expelled from Moscow in December 1943. The Swedish government then quietly began preparations for Sidorenko's release. A clemency request was submitted to the Supreme Court, which rejected it on 14 January 1944. However, the Swedish government had already prepared the pardon, scheduled for March. This revealed a disconnect between Sweden's political and judicial authorities. Moscow lost patience. On 22 February, bombs fell over Stockholm and Strängnäs. Three days later, Sidorenko was pardoned. He and his wife were swiftly and discreetly flown out of Sweden.

=== Later work ===
During his tenure as deputy state secretary for foreign affairs, Assarsson played a leading and inspirational role in the extensive restoration of the Arvfurstens palats—the headquarters of the Ministry for Foreign Affairs—returning it to its original grandeur. He retired in 1955, having left his position in 1953, at which point he was succeeded by Leif Belfrage.

In April 1954, Assarsson was newly elected to the board of B.A. Hjorth & Co. He also served as a board member of the Tessin Society (Tessinsällskapet) until 1959, as well as AB Bacho and Contactor Co.

In November 1957, Assarsson, together with Rear Admiral Einar Blidberg, was among the 17 signatories of an appeal issued by a committee calling for Swedish aid to those affected by the devastating floods in Valencia, Spain, the previous month. The fundraising efforts were carried out in collaboration with Rädda Barnen. The committee had been formed on the initiative of the Swedish-Spanish Society (Svensk-spanska sällskapet) in Stockholm.

== Personal life ==
Assarsson owned Villa Bergsgården on southern Djurgården in Stockholm from 1944. In 1954, he donated it to the Swedish Academy, intending for it to serve as an honorary residence for the Academy's Permanent Secretary or another member.

Beyond his diplomatic career, Assarsson was also known as a collector of art and curiosities, including antique silver, 18th-century paintings, and antique furniture. He held the Swedish record for the highest number of Grand Crosses—27 in total.

In 1963, he published his memoir, In the Shadow of Stalin, in which he recounted his experiences as Sweden's envoy in Moscow from 1940 to 1944.

Assarsson's literary tastes were primarily focused on classic literature, with Michel de Montaigne and Charles Augustin Sainte-Beuve among his favorite authors.

== Death ==
Assarsson died on 11 October 1974 in Oscar Parish in Stockholm, Sweden. He was interred on 19 November 1975 at Galärvarvskyrkogården in Stockholm.

== Awards and decorations ==
In 1963, it was reported that Assarsson held the Swedish record for the highest number of Grand Crosses—27 in total.

In 1967, according to the Ordenskalender, he was reported to be the second most decorated Swede, with 29 distinctions, ranking just behind Envoy Ove Ramel, who held 35.

By 1972, it was reported that Assarsson had 29 distinctions, including 21 Grand Crosses.

=== Sweden ===
- (Sweden) Commander Grand Cross of the Order of the Polar Star (6 June 1945)
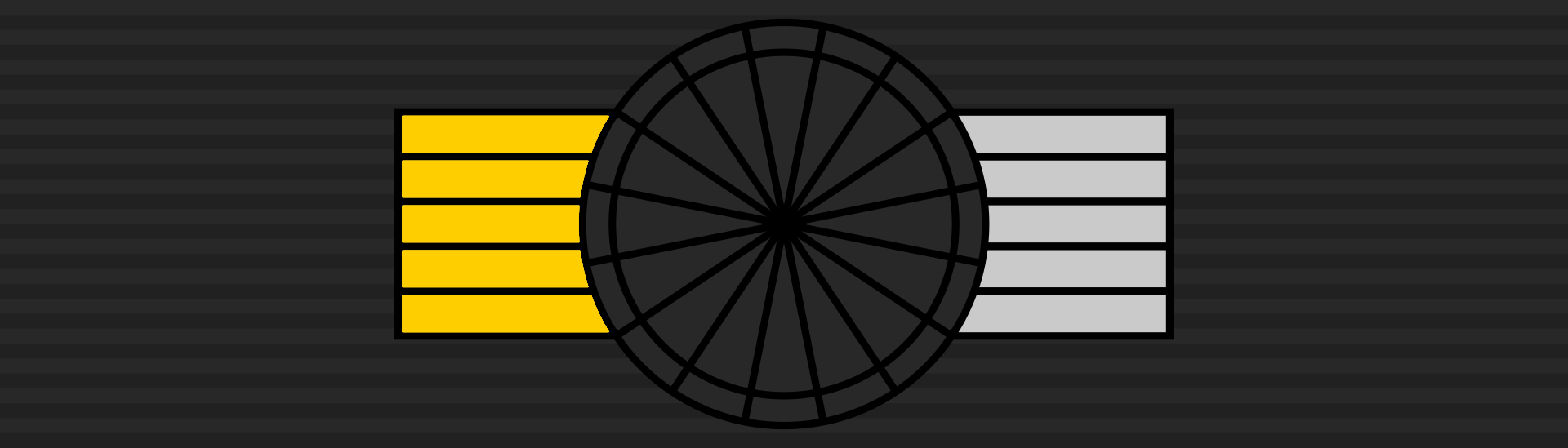
- (Sweden) Commander 1st Class of the Order of the Polar Star (5 June 1937)
- (Sweden) Knight of the Order of the Polar Star (1926)

=== Foreign ===
- (Argentina) Grand Cross of the Order of Merit (19 February 1953)
- (Belgium) Grand Cross of the Order of Leopold II
- (Brazil) Grand Cross of the Order of the Southern Cross (May 1947)
- (Chile) Grand Cross of the Order of Merit
- (Denmark) Grand Cross of the Order of the Dannebrog
- (Ethiopian Empire) Grand Cross of the Order of Menelik II
- Grand Cross of the Order of the White Rose of Finland
- Commander 1st Class of the Order of the White Rose of Finland (14 May 1948)
- Grand Cross of the Order of the Lion of Finland (1945)
- (France) Grand Cross of the Order of the Black Star
- (Kingdom of Greece) Grand Cross of the Order of the Phoenix
- (Kingdom of Greece) Grand Cross of the Order of George I
- (Taiwan) Grand Cross of the Order of Brilliant Star
- (Mexico) Sash of the Order of the Aztec Eagle (21 March 1950)
- (Netherlands) Grand Cross of the Order of Orange-Nassau
- (Norway) Grand Cross of the Order of St. Olav
- Grand Cross of the Order of the Sun of Peru
- (Thailand) 1st Class of the Order of the Crown of Siam
- (Spain) Grand Cross of the Order of Isabella the Catholic
- (Czechoslovakia) Grand Cross of the Order of the White Lion
- (West Germany) Grand Cross of the Order of Merit of the Federal Republic of Germany
- (Bolivia) Grand Officer of the Order of the Condor of the Andes
- (Colombia) Grand Officer of the Order of Boyacá
- (Cuba) Grand Officer of the Order of Carlos Manuel de Céspedes
- (France) Grand Officer of the Legion of Honour
- (Tunisia) Grand Officer of the Order of Glory
- (Venezuela) Grand Officer of the Order of the Liberator
- (Belgium) Officer of the Order of the Crown
- (United Kingdom) Officer of the Order of the British Empire

== Popular culture ==
He is depicted in the movie The Swedish Connection (2026), played by Stefan Galbác, during the events leading up to the rescue of the Danish Jews. He does not take part in the actual events of the film but is depicted being repeatedly called to 2 AM "meetings" by Stalin, showing that the Moscow posting was deeply undesirable.

== Bibliography ==
- Assarsson, Vilhelm (1963). I skuggan av Stalin [In the shadow of Stalin] (in Swedish). Stockholm: Bonnier. SELIBR 8390022.

Diplomatic posts
Preceded by Folke Wennerberg	Consul/Consul General of Sweden to Leningrad; 1931–1935	Succeeded by Einar Yttergren
Preceded by Einar Modig	Envoy of Sweden to Peru; 1935–1937	Succeeded by Gunnar Reuterskiöld
Preceded by Einar Modig	Envoy of Sweden to Bolivia; 1935–1937	Succeeded by Gunnar Reuterskiöld
Preceded by Einar Modig	Envoy of Sweden to Colombia; 1935–1937	Succeeded by Gunnar Reuterskiöld
Preceded by Einar Modig	Envoy of Sweden to Ecuador; 1935–1937	Succeeded by Gunnar Reuterskiöld
Preceded by Einar Modig	Envoy of Sweden to Venezuela; 1935–1937	Succeeded by Gunnar Reuterskiöld
Preceded by Gylfe Anderberg	Envoy of Sweden to Mexico; 1938–1940	Succeeded by Rolf Arfwedson as Chargé d'affaires ad interim
Preceded by Gylfe Anderberg	Envoy of Sweden to Nicaragua; 1938–1940	Succeeded by Herbert Ribbing
Preceded by Gylfe Anderberg	Envoy of Sweden to Panama; 1938–1940	Succeeded by Herbert Ribbing
Preceded by Gylfe Anderberg	Envoy of Sweden to Costa Rica; 1938–1940	Succeeded by Herbert Ribbing
Preceded by Gylfe Anderberg	Envoy of Sweden to Guatemala; 1938–1940	Succeeded by Herbert Ribbing
Preceded by Gylfe Anderberg	Envoy of Sweden to El Salvador; 1938–1940	Succeeded by Herbert Ribbing
Preceded by Gylfe Anderberg	Envoy of Sweden to Honduras; 1938–1940	Succeeded by Herbert Ribbing
Preceded by Gylfe Anderberg	Envoy of Sweden to Cuba; 1938–1939	Succeeded by Erik Wisén as Chargé d'affaires ad interim
Preceded by Wilhelm Winther	Envoy of Sweden to the Soviet Union; 1940–1944	Succeeded by Staffan Söderblom
Civic offices
Preceded by None	Deputy State Secretary for Foreign Affairs; 1944–1953	Succeeded by Leif Belfrage
