= 2022 Foreign Espionage Act =

The foreign espionage law (Swedish: lagen om utlandsspioneri) is a law that came into effect in Sweden on 1 January 2023. The act expanded espionage law in Sweden to criminalise the release of sensitive information that could damage Sweden's relationships with its allies as foreign espionage. The act involved changes to two of the four Basic Laws of Sweden: the Freedom of the Press Act (Swedish: Tryckfrihetsförordningen) and the Fundamental Law on Freedom of Expression (Swedish: Yttrandefrihetsgrundlagen).

== Legislative history ==
In December 2017, an inquiry led by the Swedish government proposed the introduction of a new law that would create the crime of foreign espionage, particularly concerning reporting of sensitive information by the press. The inquiry stated that "intelligence services use foreign journalism as a guide to gather information," that there was "nothing to prevent Russian or other foreign actors to establish media in Sweden that are then covered by Swedish constitutional laws," and that there had been cases of Swedish media reports damaging the country's relationship with its allies.

On 6 April 2022, the bill passed its first reading in the Riksdag. On 16 November 2022, the bill passed its final reading in the Riksdag. The law was approved with 270 votes in favour and 37 against, and will come into effect on 1 January 2023. Only the Left Party and the Green Party voted against, with all other parties voting in favour.

== Reactions ==
The Swedish Union of Journalists stated that the law would "make journalism more difficult," particularly by degrading legal protections for whistleblowers.

== See also ==
- Anders Kompass
