= Sven Grafström =

Swedish diplomat (1902–1955)

- Born: 2 November 1902; Stockholm, Sweden
- Died: 3 January 1955 (aged 52); Joigny, France
- Resting place: Solna Cemetery
- Education: Stockholm School of Economics; Stockholm University College
- Occupation: Diplomat
- Years active: 1928–1955
- Spouse: Gerda von Twardowski (m. 1936)
- Children: 3

Sven Hjalmarsson Grafström (2 November 1902 – 3 January 1955) was a Swedish diplomat and senior foreign affairs official whose career spanned the interwar period, the Second World War, and the early Cold War. Joining the Swedish Ministry for Foreign Affairs as an attaché in 1928, he quickly established himself as one of the ministry's most capable diplomats through postings in Oslo, London, Moscow, Tehran, Ankara, and Warsaw. His service in Warsaw during the outbreak of the Second World War brought him into the center of one of Europe's greatest crises, where he participated in the evacuation of foreign nationals and witnessed the German occupation of Poland.

During the war, Grafström became head of the Press Office at the Ministry for Foreign Affairs and later director of the Political Department, placing him among the key officials responsible for Sweden's foreign policy administration and international communications. His wartime diaries reveal both the practical challenges of maintaining Swedish neutrality and his own reflections on the moral and political dilemmas faced by the country.

After 1945, Grafström played an important role in shaping Sweden's postwar diplomacy. He served as head of the Political Department, represented Sweden in the early United Nations, and became the country's Permanent Representative to the UN, where he worked on issues related to the Korean War and international conflict resolution. In 1952 he was appointed Swedish envoy to Mexico, with concurrent accreditation to several Central American states, and the following year became Sweden's first representative on the Neutral Nations Supervisory Commission in Korea before returning to his post in Mexico. Although his diplomatic career was cut short by his accidental death in 1955, Grafström left behind an extensive collection of diaries that constitute an important historical source on Swedish diplomacy before, during, and after the Second World War.

== Early life ==
Grafström was born on 2 November 1902 in Hedvig Eleonora Parish, Stockholm, Sweden. He was the son of Hjalmar Grafström, a district court judge, and his wife, Helfrid Nilsson. He had two siblings: his brother Nils Grafström, a lawyer, and his sister Margit Grafström, who was married to the court superintendent Nils G. Wollin. He was also a cousin of Professor Åke Grafström.

The family lived in Stockholm's Östermalm district. Grafström attended Nya elementarskolan, where he followed the classical, or Latin, curriculum and graduated with his studentexamen on 12 May 1921. He went on to study at the Stockholm School of Economics, earning a degree in business administration in 1923. On 30 December 1926, he was commissioned as a second lieutenant in the reserve of the Göta Life Guards.

That same year, in the autumn term of 1926, Grafström enrolled at Stockholm University College. He completed his studies there with a kansliexamen, a degree qualifying him for service in the Swedish civil administration, on 29 May 1928.

== Career ==
=== Early diplomatic career ===
Grafström joined the Swedish Ministry for Foreign Affairs as an attaché in 1928. During the following years, he served in Oslo, London, Moscow, Tehran, and Ankara. He was appointed first secretary in 1935 and first legation secretary in Warsaw in 1936. While serving in Warsaw, Grafström became involved in diplomatic efforts to evacuate diplomats and foreign nationals as the political and military situation deteriorated in Poland. In November 1939, he returned to Warsaw and recorded in his diary his observations of the German occupation. He described witnessing German soldiers abusing and tormenting Jews, apparently for amusement. Although he considered intervening, he refrained because his mission—to arrange the repatriation of Swedish property and furniture—had not yet been completed. He also recorded the numerous people who approached him seeking permission to enter Sweden, requests he was unable to grant.

Grafström remained involved in efforts to assist Swedes in Poland during the winter of 1939–40. According to his widow, Gerda Grafström, he was deeply affected by what he witnessed during the occupation. He organized a convoy from Warsaw to the Polish Baltic coast for Swedish nationals who wished to leave the country. During his time in Warsaw, Grafström also became involved in contacts between Swedish diplomats and representatives of the Polish resistance. A network operated through the Swedish diplomatic courier service between Berlin and Warsaw, and Swedish businessmen in Poland also assisted Polish resistance activities. Several Swedes became involved in clandestine activities connected with the resistance; four were sentenced to death and others to prison terms, although all were released in 1944.

In the autumn of 1940, the Swedish Ministry for Foreign Affairs agreed to facilitate the transfer of funds from London through Stockholm and Berlin to Polish resistance couriers. According to historian Jozef Lewandowski, the Swedish side was assured that the funds were intended for humanitarian purposes, and the arrangements were not subjected to close scrutiny. Lewandowski attributed an important role in the decisions to Carl Herslow, Erik Boheman and Grafström, all of whom had served in Warsaw. ASEA exeutive Sven Norrman later described Grafström as a prominent advocate of the resistance movement's interests within the Swedish Ministry for Foreign Affairs.

=== Wartime work at the Ministry for Foreign Affairs ===
In 1941, Grafström became director (byråchef) at the Ministry for Foreign Affairs, with responsibility for press affairs and contacts with foreign correspondents. He was also involved in arranging visits to Sweden by foreign journalists and other temporary "information guests". Between 1939 and 1943, he served as secretary of the Information Board (Upplysningsnämnden) and the Swedish Arts Council. He was a member of the Committee on Foreign Affairs from 1941 to 1943 and gave radio lectures on foreign policy in 1942 and 1943. As head of the Press Office, Grafström participated in decisions concerning which information about Swedish foreign policy should be made public. These decisions were taken in cooperation with the Information Board and within the framework of government policy. In a diary entry written at the beginning of the Second World War, he noted that Sweden's continued neutrality would require "skilful manoeuvring, the utmost caution, and a great deal of luck".

Grafström's wartime diaries also contain criticism of the government's policy of neutrality and its handling of relations with Germany. After the Winter War, he wrote that he had come to reject the basis of the government's actions, which he associated with a policy of avoiding risks. Following the German occupation of Denmark and Norway in April 1940, he expressed concern that excessive caution could lead Sweden towards German influence. In a diary entry of 23 May 1940, he wrote that the situation was "extraordinarily dangerous" and argued that fear itself could become a greater danger than the risks the government was seeking to avoid. At the same time, Grafström recognized that Sweden's military position could make concessions unavoidable. His diaries, however, contain relatively little discussion of the government's internal deliberations or of the considerations of Foreign Minister Christian Günther. Grafström was frequently critical of Günther and of several other senior officials.

Grafström's relationship with Arvid Richert, Sweden's minister in Berlin, was also marked by criticism. In his diaries, he accused Richert of advocating concessions to Germany and of taking an overly accommodating approach towards German authorities. Later assessments have noted that this characterization does not fully reflect Richert's documented role in Swedish-German relations, including his involvement in the termination of German military transit through Sweden in 1943. Erik Boheman was among Grafström's closest colleagues and friends. Grafström sometimes expressed criticism of Boheman in his diary, but generally described him as an energetic and capable colleague whose political judgment and outlook he valued. He also maintained a close relationship with Otto Järte, whom he described as an intellectually stimulating figure. Their discussions included the course of the war and the political situation in Sweden.

During a visit to Berlin in November 1941, Grafström expressed opposition to the assumption among some German officials that Germany would ultimately win the war. After the Allied landings in North Africa in November 1942, he described the development as a possible turning point in the war. By 1944, his diary entries increasingly reflected uncertainty about the future course of international affairs. In March 1945, Grafström was appointed head of the Political Department at the Ministry for Foreign Affairs. His wartime experiences and his views on Swedish foreign policy continued to influence his assessment of the country's international position during the final months of the war.

=== Postwar foreign service ===
Grafström served as deputy head of the Political Department from 1944 and became its head in 1945, a position he held until 1948. He was involved in the Swedish government's handling of the extradition of Baltic soldiers in 1945–46 and in the Ministry for Foreign Affairs' work concerning the case of Raoul Wallenberg during its early postwar years. From 1944 to 1948, Grafström was deputy secretary of the Advisory Council on Foreign Affairs. He also served as a member of the National Swedish Board of Civil Aviation (Luftfartsstyrelsen) from 1945 to 1949 and represented Sweden at the Assembly of the League of Nations in 1946.

Grafström's diaries from the postwar period reflect differences between his views on foreign policy and those of Foreign Minister Östen Undén. Grafström favored maintaining Sweden's non-alignment while also maintaining close relations with the Western powers. In 1949, he criticized what he regarded as an overly restrictive interpretation of neutrality and expressed concern about Sweden's relations with the Soviet Union. He was also critical of Rolf Sohlman, Sweden's ambassador in Moscow, whom he considered too accommodating towards the Soviet Union. Grafström recorded and discussed differing views within the Swedish foreign service concerning how Sweden should respond to the Soviet Union and the Western powers. Undén's own diary contained a more favorable assessment of Sohlman's judgment in international affairs, describing his observations and assessments as independent and clear-sighted.

=== Sweden and the United Nations ===
From 1948, Grafström served as Sweden's representative at the United Nations. His work there brought him increasing international experience, including during the Korean War. He was appointed to a three-member UN "good offices" committee and was given responsibility for preparing and handling matters connected with the international response to developments in the Far East. In 1949, he also served as a Swedish delegate to the International Committee of the UN General Assembly.

One of the principal foreign-policy disagreements of Grafström's career occurred in 1951. Together with Erik Boheman and Rickard Sandler, he argued that Sweden should support a proposal in the United Nations declaring the People's Republic of China an aggressor in the Korean War. The Swedish government instead decided to abstain. Grafström regarded the vote as a significant development in the direction of Swedish foreign policy and recorded his disappointment in his diary.

=== Mexico and Korea ===
In 1952, Grafström was appointed Swedish envoy in Mexico City, with concurrent accreditation to Guatemala, Nicaragua, Costa Rica, El Salvador and Honduras. His posting was interrupted in 1953, when he was appointed, with the rank of major general, as Sweden's first representative to the Neutral Nations Supervisory Commission (NNSC) in Korea. After his return to Mexico, Grafström's diary entries included observations about the difference between his diplomatic assignments. In December 1953, he described Mexico as a less interesting posting than some of his earlier assignments, while also noting its favorable climate.

=== Later years and legacy ===
Grafström's relationship with Östen Undén remained complex. Although he frequently criticized Undén's policies and decisions in his diaries, he did not generally express the same personal hostility towards him that he sometimes directed towards other colleagues. His writings also show a continued concern with the direction of Swedish foreign policy and with the relationship between neutrality and Sweden's relations with the Western powers. Grafström maintained close professional and personal relationships with several members of the Swedish foreign service, particularly Erik Boheman. His diaries also contain accounts of his family life and his relationship with his wife and children.

During the early postwar period, Grafström served as Sweden's Permanent Representative to the United Nations. According to Tage Erlander, there were discussions about replacing him with a representative associated with the Social Democratic Party, and he was subsequently replaced in the position. Grafström's diaries were published in two volumes in 1989, comprising approximately 1,300 pages. The diaries provide a detailed account of Swedish foreign-policy discussions and of the work of the Swedish foreign service before, during and after the Second World War. The journalist Ulf Brandell of Dagens Nyheter wrote that the diaries portrayed Grafström as a person of strong convictions and integrity, while also providing insight into his family life and his professional environment.

The published diaries included almost all of Grafström's surviving notes, with the exception of three pages dealing with highly private matters. They contain both detailed observations of political and diplomatic events and personal assessments of colleagues and other contemporary figures.

== Personal life ==
Grafström married Gertrud (Gerda) Helena Aline Tugendreich von Twardowski on 18 January 1936 in Grunewald, Berlin. Born in Berlin on 19 June 1915, she was the daughter of Ambassador Fritz von Twardowski and Gertrud Ahrens. She died on 27 June 2014. Grafström was the Swedish envoy to Mexico during the same period that his father-in-law was the German ambassador to Mexico.

The couple had three children: Birgitta, Cecilia (died in 1985), and Anders.

== Death and funeral ==
=== Death ===
On 3 January 1955, Grafström was found dead beside the railway line, approximately two kilometres from Joigny, about 140 kilometres southeast of Paris, France. Everything indicated that he had accidentally fallen from the train during the night. He had been travelling to Paris, from where he was to continue by air to Mexico. Grafström had spent a short holiday in Sanremo on the Italian Riviera. The train, which had come from Nice, arrived in Paris at 8:10 a.m., where the conductor discovered that luggage and other personal belongings had been left in one of the compartments. They were identified as Grafström's possessions. According to a telegram received by the Swedish Ministry for Foreign Affairs on 3 January, which Grafström had sent shortly before leaving Sanremo, he had changed his travel plans to Mexico, replacing the planned sea voyage with a flight from Paris. The change was made so that he could arrive in time for a meeting with an official from the National Swedish Board of Public Building (Byggnadsstyrelsen) in Stockholm.

On 4 January, Embassy Counsellor Lennart Petri was present when representatives of the French police and railway authorities broke the seal on the door of Grafström's compartment. The compartment had been sealed while the preliminary investigation was being conducted. The investigators found that the compartment window was open and, among other evidence, established from fingerprints that Grafström himself had opened it. The window mechanism was similar to those used on Swedish railway carriages: the window was lowered into the wall of the carriage. Investigators concluded that Grafström had been kneeling on his bed and had initially tried to open the window with his left hand while supporting himself with his right. Apparently unable to open it in this manner, he then used his right hand as well. The fingerprints were considered consistent with this sequence of events. The window mechanism required considerable force to lower the window a short distance, after which it moved substantially more easily. Grafström had apparently not anticipated this. When the window suddenly opened, he lost his balance and fell from the train. The train normally travelled at between 125 and 140 kilometres per hour on this section of the line. His death was probably instantaneous. The French police found no evidence contradicting this explanation of the accident. The Swedish authorities saw no reason to request a further investigation and considered the circumstances of the accident to have been satisfactorily established.

A memorial service was held at the Swedish Church in Paris on 8 January 1955. Grafström's coffin was placed in the chancel. Those attending included members of the Swedish Embassy and the Swedish OEEC delegation, the ambassadors of Mexico, Norway, and Denmark, Finland's chargé d'affaires, members of the Swedish community in Paris, and Grafström's personal friends. The rector, Rev. Bengt Strömberg, read passages from the Bible and led the congregation in prayer, after which Ambassador Karl Ivan Westman delivered a eulogy in memory of Grafström. That evening, the coffin was transported to Sweden aboard the Nordexpressen, which arrived in Stockholm on 10 January.

=== Funeral ===
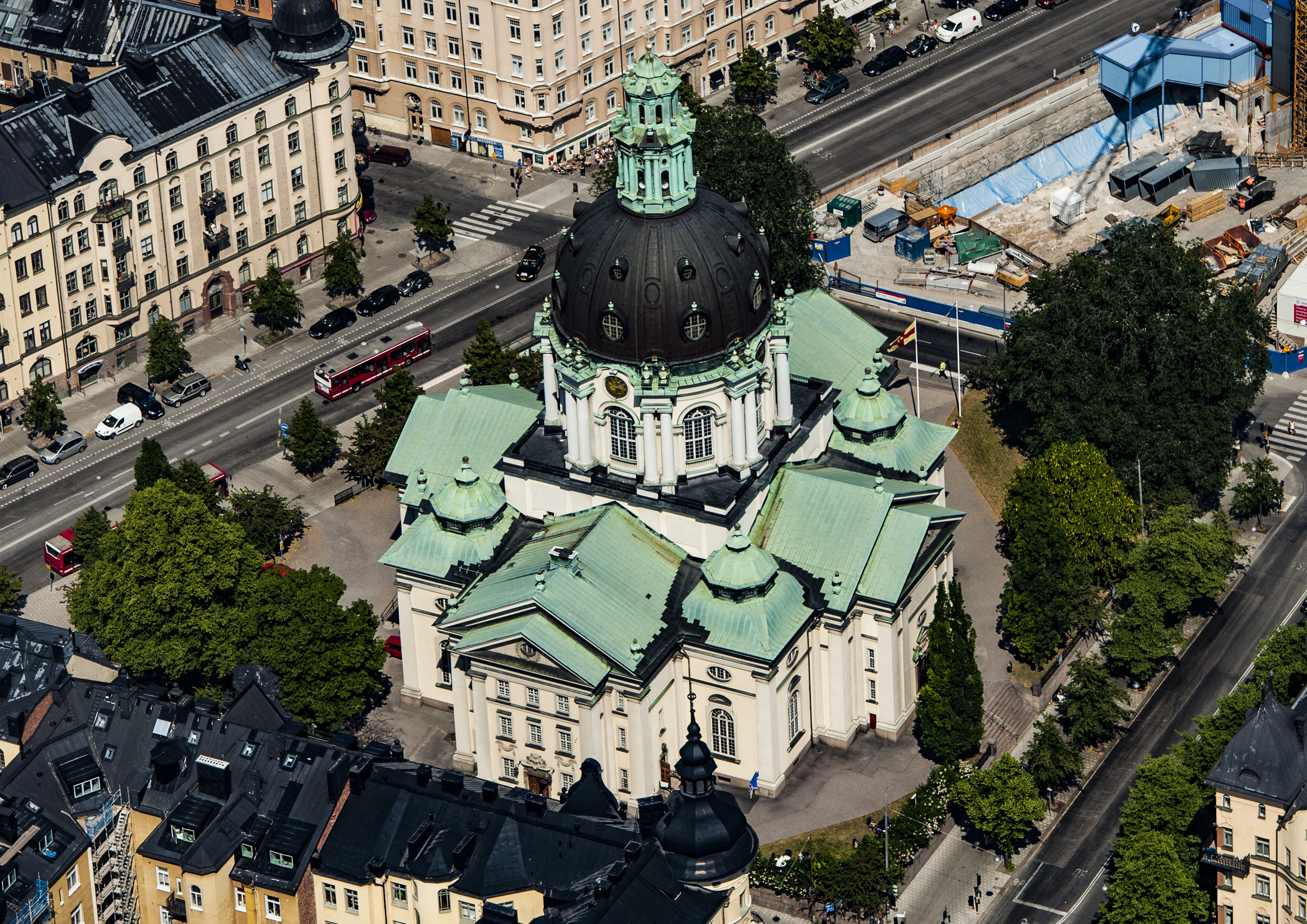
Gustaf Vasa Church (pictured in 2011), where the funeral took place

Grafström's funeral took place at Gustaf Vasa Church in Stockholm on 13 January 1955. From the organ loft came words from Hymn 320, which captured the mood of the occasion: "The clouds obscure our vision, helplessness marks our path...". The funeral service was conducted by Rev. Gerhard Thorén of Krokek. The previous summer, he had confirmed Sven and Gerda Grafström's eldest daughter, Birgitta, and his own youngest daughter had accompanied the Grafström family on several of their recent journeys to different parts of the world. Thorén based his address on a passage from the prophet Isaiah: "I have seen his ways, but now I will heal him and comfort his mourners." Before committing Sven Grafström's remains to their final resting place, Rev. Thorén read a hymn that Grafström himself had held in high regard, Johan Olof Wallin's "Where Is the Friend Whom Everywhere I Seek?"

During the Communion service, Rev. Thorén was assisted by the local parish priest, Arvid Lund, who sang the Requiem Mass. The service concluded with Edvard Grieg's "Last Spring", sung by court singer Helga Görlin, followed by Chopin's Funeral March, performed by Professor Otto Olsson. After the funeral, the invited mourners travelled to Skogskyrkogården, where a brief service was held in the Chapel of the Holy Cross. Among those accompanying Sven Grafström on his final journey were two of his former superiors from different stages of his career: Foreign Minister Östen Undén and former Foreign Minister Christian Günther. Also present were former County Governor Rickard Sandler; Countess Estelle Bernadotte; Norway's ambassador, Jens Schive; Finland's ambassador, G. A. Gripenberg; and the head of the Mexican diplomatic mission, Amalia González Caballero de Castillo Ledón. Representatives of the Korean personnel, the Defence Staff, and the Swedish-Mexican Society (Svensk-mexikanska sällskapet) were also in attendance.

Grafström's memory was honoured with numerous wreaths, including those from the Ministry for Foreign Affairs, female officials of the Ministry, his colleagues in the foreign service, Sweden's Permanent Mission to the United Nations, Swedes working at the United Nations, the Korean personnel, the Defence Staff, the Mexican Legation, the staff of the Swedish mission in Mexico, the Swedish-Mexican Society, the Scandinavian Association in Mexico, and the Swedish community in Warsaw in September 1939. On the same day as Grafström's funeral, a memorial service was held in Mexico City to commemorate his death. Among those in attendance were representatives of the Mexican government, the diplomatic corps, and the Swedish community.

Grafström and his wife, Gerda, are buried at Solna Cemetery.

== Reputation ==
Foreign Minister Östen Undén described Grafström as "a highly capable official, always deeply committed to the tasks at hand, energetic and active in all his work." He added that Grafström's death was "a serious loss to the Swedish foreign service."

Ambassador Karl Ivan Westman said: "All of us who knew Sven Grafström personally mourn the loss of a man whose lively and open personality enabled him to inspire friendship and maintain it. Those of Sven Grafström's colleagues in the foreign service who had the opportunity to work closely with him came to appreciate his expertise and his ability in public service. His mind was dominated by an interest in foreign policy and in the conditions and conflicts of international life. In Stendhal's words, one might say that he was one of those who 'made his passion his profession.' With energy and a quick eye, he tackled the matters that fell within his sphere of responsibility. He was a man with whom it was worthwhile to debate. He was rich in ideas and resourceful in finding solutions. He responded to events with his whole being, with all his temperament, yet this was tempered by a political instinct that was remarkably sure and rarely led him astray. Sven Grafström never shied away from responsibility."

Ambassador Erik Boheman recalled: "He was one of the people in the foreign service who stood closest to me. We worked together in Ankara and Warsaw, and when I was state secretary for foreign affairs at the Ministry for Foreign Affairs, Sven Grafström was head of the Press Office and head of the Political Department. We also worked closely together during his time at the United Nations here. Sven Grafström was one of the most capable people in the foreign service. His strong political interests, knowledge, and fearlessness were particularly striking. He was an excellent negotiator who commanded great respect in every circle, including among those on the opposing side. Had Sven Grafström lived, he would surely have gone on to serve in one of our highest-ranking positions, for which his qualities made him exceptionally well suited. He was, in the fullest sense, a man who could be relied upon to rise to the occasion. He leaves an indelible impression on his friends."

== Popular culture ==
In the Norwegian television film The White Buses (1988), which depicts the Swedish humanitarian operation known as the White Buses, Grafström was portrayed by actor Björn Granath.

== Awards and decorations ==
=== Swedish ===
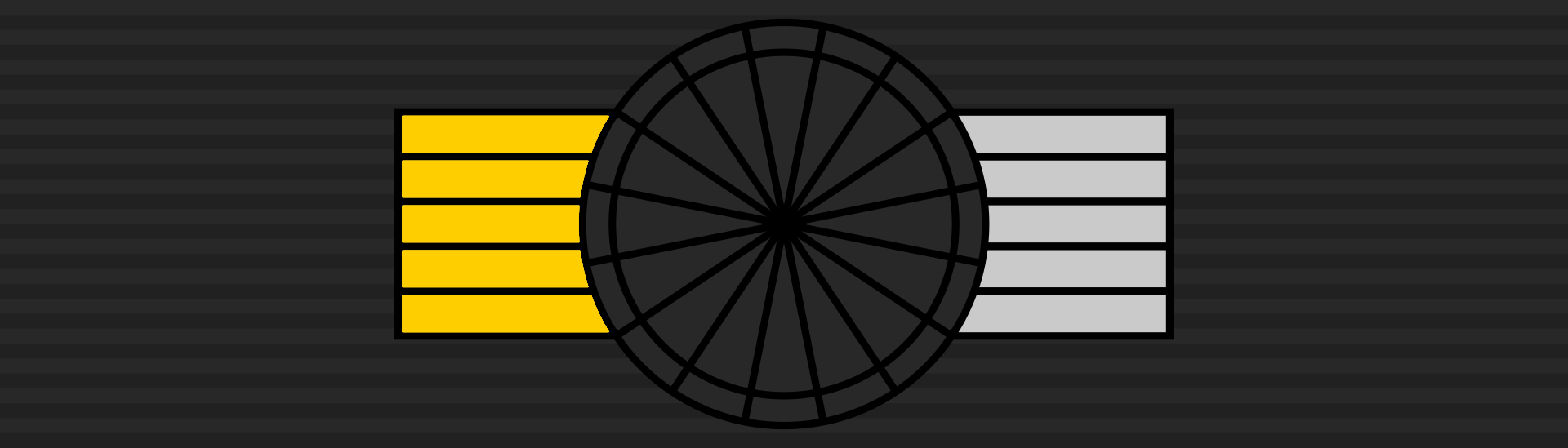
- (Sweden) Commander 1st Class of the Order of the Polar Star (11 November 1952)
- (Sweden) Commander of the Order of the Polar Star (15 November 1948)
- (Sweden) Knight of the Order of the Polar Star (1945)
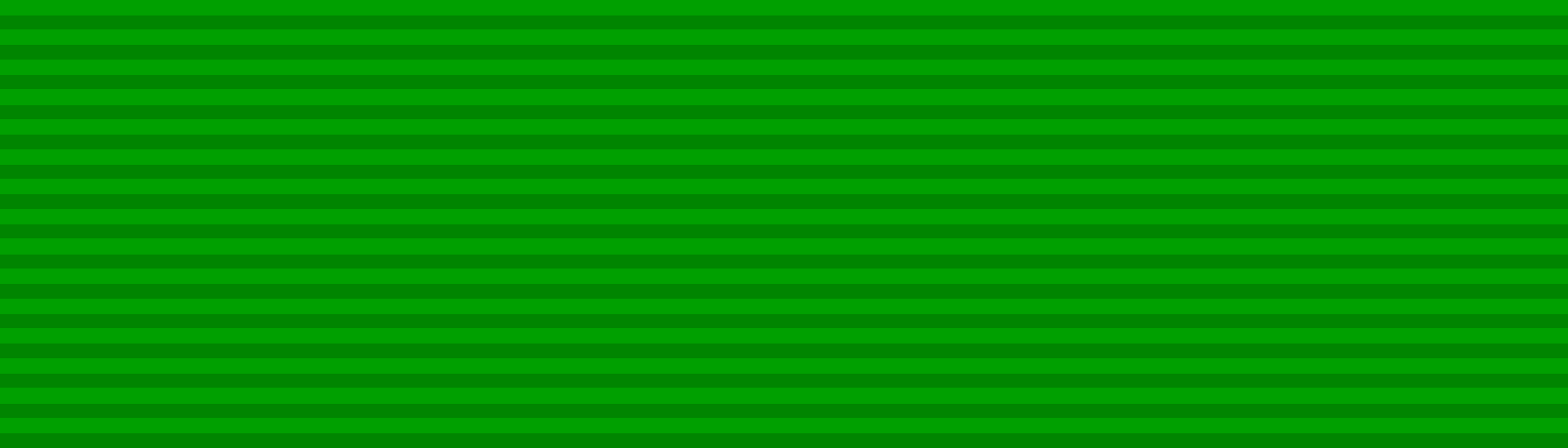
- (Sweden) Knight of the Order of Vasa (1939)

=== Foreign ===
- (Ethiopian Empire) Grand Cross of the Order of the Star of Ethiopia
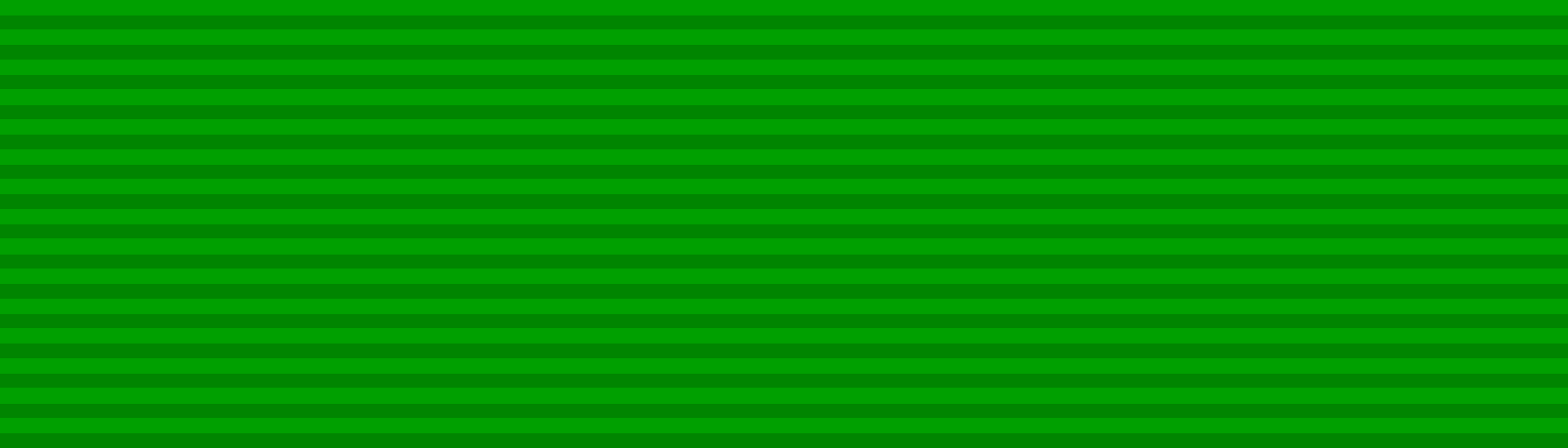
- (Greece) Grand Cross of the Order of the Phoenix
- (Belgium) Grand Officer of the Order of Leopold II
- (Denmark) Commander 1st Class of the Order of the Dannebrog
- (Netherlands) Commander of the Order of Orange-Nassau
- (Norway) Commander of the Order of St. Olav (1947)
- (Kingdom of Hungary) Commander of the Order of the Holy Crown of Hungary
- (France) Officer of the Legion of Honour

== Bibliography ==
- Grafström, Sven; Ekman, Stig (1989). Anteckningar 1938-1944 [Notes 1938-1944] (in Swedish). Stockholm: Samfundet för utgivande av handskrifter rörande Skandinaviens historia. ISBN 9185104175. SELIBR 851723.
- Grafström, Sven; Ekman, Stig (1989). Anteckningar 1945-1954 [Notes 1945-1954] (in Swedish). Stockholm: Samfundet för utgivande av handskrifter rörande Skandinaviens historia. ISBN 9185104183. SELIBR 851725.

Diplomatic posts
Preceded by Gunnar Hägglöf	Permanent Representative of Sweden to the United Nations; 1948–1952	Succeeded by Oscar Thorsing
Preceded by Claes Westring	Envoy of Sweden to Mexico; 1952–1955	Succeeded by Lennart Nylander
Preceded by Claes Westring	Envoy of Sweden to Guatemala; 1952–1955	Succeeded by Lennart Nylander
Preceded by Claes Westring	Envoy of Sweden to Nicaragua; 1952–1955	Succeeded by Lennart Nylander
Preceded by Claes Westring	Envoy of Sweden to Costa Rica; 1952–1955	Succeeded by Lennart Nylander
Preceded by Claes Westring	Envoy of Sweden to El Salvador; 1952–1955	Succeeded by Lennart Nylander
Preceded by Claes Westring	Envoy of Sweden to Honduras; 1952–1955	Succeeded by Lennart Nylander
Military offices
Preceded by None	Heads of Swedish Delegation to the NNSC; June – December 1953	Succeeded by Paul Mohn
