= List of ambassadors of Sweden to Nicaragua =

Ambassador of Sweden to Nicaragua
- Lesser coat of arms of the Kingdom of Sweden
- Incumbent; Pontus Rosenberg since 2024
- Ministry for Foreign Affairs; Swedish Embassy, Managua
- Style: His or Her Excellency (formal); Mr. or Madam Ambassador (informal)
- Reports to: Minister for Foreign Affairs
- Seat: Guatemala City, Guatemala (Note: Sweden's ambassador in Guatemala City, Guatemala is co-accredited in Managua.)
- Appointer: Government of Sweden
- Term length: No fixed term
- Inaugural holder: Gylfe Anderberg
- Formation: January 1936

The Ambassador of Sweden to Nicaragua (known formally as the Ambassador of the Kingdom of Sweden to Republic of Nicaragua) is the official representative of the government of Sweden to the president of Nicaragua and government of Nicaragua. Since Sweden does not have an embassy in Managua, Sweden's ambassador in Guatemala City, Gutemala is co-accredited in Managua.

== History ==
In January 1936, the King in Council appointed the envoy to Mexico, Gylfe Anderberg, to also serve as envoy to Nicaragua, as well as to Costa Rica, Honduras, and El Salvador.

Following the opening of the Swedish embassy in Guatemala City in 1964, the ambassador there assumed accreditation for Managua, pursuant to a council decision on 20 March of the same year.

Sweden and Nicaragua began a development cooperation program in 1979. From November of that year, Carl-Erhard Lindahl was appointed to the newly established position of minister at the embassy in Guatemala City, although he primarily worked at the aid office in Managua, where he also served as chargé d'affaires ad interim.

Sweden opened an embassy in Managua at the turn of 1983–84. The embassy focused mainly on development aid. Göte Magnusson was appointed Sweden's first resident ambassador to Managua. The Swedish ambassador in Managua was also accredited to San José, Costa Rica (1984–2000), and Panama City, Panama (1991–2000).

In 2007, the Swedish government decided to phase out development aid to Nicaragua. As a result, the embassy was converted into a section office, tasked solely with managing the phase-out of aid, which was operated by the Swedish International Development Cooperation Agency (SIDA). The embassy was closed in 2008. Thereafter, accreditation for Managua once again fell under the responsibility of the Swedish ambassador in Guatemala City.

== List of representatives ==
Name	Period	Resident/Non resident	Title	Notes	Presented credentials	Ref
Gylfe Anderberg	January 1936 – 1937	Non-resident	Acting envoy	Resident in Mexico City.		
Vilhelm Assarsson	1 February 1938 – 1940	Non-resident	Envoy	Resident in Mexico City.		
Herbert Ribbing	1943–1949	Non-resident	Envoy	Resident in Mexico City.		
Claes Westring	1949–1952	Non-resident	Envoy	Resident in Mexico City.		
Sven Grafström	6 June 1952 – 3 January 1955 (Note: However, the service in Mexico was interrupted for six months in 1953, when Grafström, with the rank of major general, became the first Swedish representative in the Neutral Nations Supervisory Commission in Korea.)	Non-resident	Envoy	Resident in Mexico City. Died in office. (Note: Grafström was found on 3 January 1955, on the railway line two km from Joigny, 140 km southeast of Paris, France. Grafström was on his way to Paris and from there to continue by plane to Mexico City.)		
Lennart Nylander	1955–1956	Non-resident	Envoy	Resident in Mexico City.	January 1956	
Lennart Nylander	1956–1962	Non-resident	Ambassador	Resident in Mexico City.		
Tord Göransson	1962–1964	Non-resident	Ambassador	Resident in Mexico City.		
Arne Björnberg	1964–1969	Non-resident	Ambassador	Resident in Guatemala City.		
Harald Edelstam	1969–1972	Non-resident	Ambassador	Resident in Guatemala City.		
Claës König	1972–1976	Non-resident	Ambassador	Resident in Guatemala City.		
Arne Helleryd	1976–1978	Non-resident	Ambassador	Resident in Guatemala City.		
Henrik Ramel	1979–1981	Non-resident	Ambassador	Resident in Guatemala City.		
Carl-Erhard Lindahl	1979–1981	Resident	Chargé d'affaires ad interim (Note: Chargé d'affaires ad interim with the diplomatic rank of minister.)			
Carl-Erhard Lindahl	1981–1983	Non-resident	Ambassador	Resident in Guatemala City.		
Hans von Knorring	1981–1983	Resident	Chargé d'affaires ad interim			
Göte Magnusson	1984–1988	Resident	Ambassador	Also accredited to San José.		
Harald Fälth	1988–1991	Resident	Ambassador	Also accredited to San José.		
Lars Jonsson	1991–1993	Resident	Ambassador	Also accredited to Panama City and San José.		
Eivor Halkjaer	1994–1997	Resident	Ambassador	Also accredited to Panama City and San José.		
Jan Bjerninger	1997–2000	Resident	Ambassador	Also accredited to Panama City and San José.		
Klas Markensten	2000–2003	Resident	Ambassador			
Eva Zetterberg	2003–2008	Resident	Ambassador			
Ewa Werner-Dahlin	2008–2010	Non-resident	Ambassador	Resident in Guatemala City.		
Michael Frühling	2010–2014	Non-resident	Ambassador	Resident in Guatemala City.		
Georg Andrén	2014 – 31 August 2017	Non-resident	Ambassador	Resident in Guatemala City.		
Anders Kompass	December 2017 – 2020	Non-resident	Ambassador	Resident in Guatemala City.		
Hans Magnusson	1 September 2020 – 2024	Non-resident	Ambassador	Resident in Guatemala City.		
Pontus Rosenberg	2024–present	Non-resident	Ambassador	Resident in Guatemala City.		
