= Herbert Ribbing =

Swedish diplomat (1897–1985)

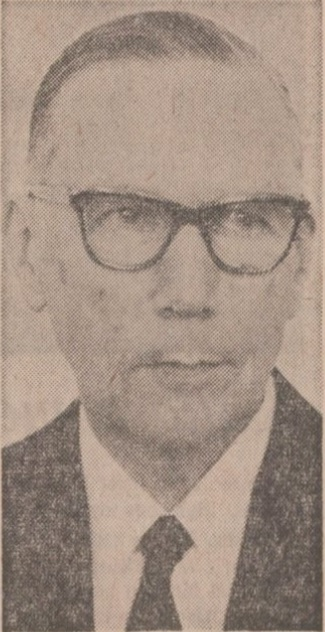
- Born: Bo Herbert Bosson Ribbing; 8 July 1897; Eksjö, Sweden
- Died: 30 December 1985 (aged 88); Hassle, Sweden
- Education: Stockholm School of Economics; Uppsala University
- Occupation: Diplomat
- Years active: 1922–1979
- Spouse: Adrienne von Rosen (m. 1930)
- Children: 4

Bo Herbert Bosson Ribbing (8 July 1897 – 30 December 1985) was a Swedish diplomat. Ribbing began his diplomatic career in 1922 as an attaché at the Swedish Ministry for Foreign Affairs, shortly thereafter serving in Paris. During the 1920s, he held a series of posts across Europe, including assignments in Koblenz, Düsseldorf, London, Riga, Tallinn, Kaunas, and Helsinki, often serving as first legation secretary or chargé d’affaires ad interim. He was actively involved in international diplomacy early on, assisting Sweden’s representation at the League of Nations and participating in Nordic and Geneva Protocol negotiations.

In 1936, Ribbing became director of the Trade Department at the Ministry for Foreign Affairs. He subsequently served as legation counsellor in Paris (1938) and Washington, D.C. (1942). From 1944, he was Sweden’s envoy to several Latin American countries, including Mexico, Guatemala, Panama, Nicaragua, Costa Rica, El Salvador, and Honduras. He later served as envoy and then ambassador to Argentina, Uruguay, and Paraguay (1949–1957), and as ambassador to Spain from 1958 to 1963.

Ribbing also held significant roles within the United Nations, acting as mediator in conflicts between Saudi Arabia and Oman (1960), reviewing sovereignty issues in the Sultanate of Muscat and Oman (1963), and mediating the Cambodian–Thai border dispute (1966–1968). Additionally, he was a member of the Permanent Court of Arbitration in The Hague (1967–1979) and part of the Swedish–Spanish Conciliation Commission from 1967.

== Early life ==
Ribbing was born into the noble family Ribbing on 8 July 1897 at Rolandsdam near Eksjö, Sweden, the son of Lieutenant Colonel Bo Ribbing (1858–1936) and Anna Augusta Silverstolpe. He was the brother of the pianist Stig Ribbing (1904–2002), the grandson of the courtier and politician Carl Ribbing (1826–1899), and the nephew of the physician Gustaf Ribbing (1862–1918).

On his mother’s side, his grandfather was Major General August Silverstolpe (1822–1898), his great-grandfather was the clergyman and writer Gustaf Abraham Silverstolpe (1772–1824), and his great-great-grandfather was the civil servant and numismatist Fredrik Silfverstolpe (1732–1812). His maternal uncle was Major General Oscar Silverstolpe (1856–1927).

Ribbing completed his secondary school examinations in Växjö on 21 May 1915 and became an officer cadet in the Svea Artillery Regiment on 26 June 1915. He enrolled at the Stockholm School of Economics on 28 September 1915, graduating on 21 June 1918, and then studied at Uppsala University from 18 April 1918, receiving a Bachelor of Arts on 1 November 1919 and a Candidate of Law degree on 15 December 1921. At the university he was a member of the Juvenalorden.

== Career ==
Ribbing was appointed attaché at the Ministry for Foreign Affairs on 3 July 1922 and in Paris on 1 February 1923. He served on special assignment in Koblenz and Düsseldorf from 27 May to 6 October 1923, and was acting first legation secretary in Paris from 27 October 1923 to 7 July 1924. He was assistant secretary to the Swedish representative on the Council of the League of Nations in 1923 and 1924; assistant secretary to the Nordic conference for the establishment of permanent commissions of inquiry and conciliation in 1924; and assistant secretary to the experts tasked with giving an opinion on the so-called Geneva Protocol in 1924–1925.

He was attaché in London from 21 April 1925, second legation secretary there from 24 August 1926, and first legation secretary from 13 June 1928. He served as first legation secretary in Riga, Tallinn, and Kaunas from 1 February 1929; chargé d’affaires ad interim in those postings from 30 April to 2 June 1929 and from 15 November to 1 December 1929; and acting consul in Tallinn from 12 September to 14 November 1929. On 13 December 1929 he became first legation secretary on special assignment in Helsinki, where he also served as chargé d’affaires ad interim at various times in 1930.

Ribbing became director (byråchef) of the Trade Department at the Ministry for Foreign Affairs in 1936 (acting from 1934), legation counsellor in Paris in 1938 and in Washington, D.C., in 1942, and envoy to Mexico City, with concurrent accreditation to Guatemala City, Managua, Panama, San José, San Salvador, and Tegucigalpa in 1944 (acting from 1943). He was envoy to Buenos Aires, Asunción, and Montevideo in 1949, and ambassador in Buenos Aires in 1957. From 1958 to 1963 he served as ambassador to Madrid.

On behalf of the United Nations, he undertook mediation in a conflict between Saudi Arabia and Oman in 1960; in 1963 he was tasked with reviewing issues of sovereignty in the Sultanate of Muscat and Oman. From 1966 to 1968 Ribbing again served as a UN mediator, this time in a serious Cambodian–Thai border dispute. He was a member of the Permanent Court of Arbitration in The Hague from 1967 to 1979 and of the standing Swedish–Spanish Conciliation Commission from 1967.

== Personal life ==
Ribbing married, on 12 March 1930 in Storkyrkan, Stockholm, Countess Adrienne Ebba Louise von Rosen (8 July 1908, Stockholm – 17 August 2002), the daughter of the chamberlain Count Carl Louis von Rosen and Countess Adrienne Louise Ottiliana Carolina De Geer af Leufsta. They had four children: Catharina (born 1931), Marina (born 1934), Bo (born 1938), and Birgitta (born 1943).

Following the death of Chamberlain Count Magnus Brahe in 1930, five estates at Rydboholm in Täby socken, Stockholm County, were transferred on 29 April that year to Countess Adrienne von Rosen, then 22 years old. The estates comprised Hägernäs, Norra and Södra Rönninge, and Östra and Västra Arninge.

After Ribbing left the Ministry for Foreign Affairs, he and his wife Adrienne retired to the Fåleberg estate in Hassle socken, Mariestad Municipality, which they had acquired shortly after the war. At Fåleberg he devoted himself to extensive research on his kinsman, the opposition politician and revolutionary Adolph Ribbing, one of the leading figures in the regicide of King Gustav III in 1792. Increasing visual impairment, and ultimately complete blindness, forced him to lay down his pen.

== Death ==
Ribbing died on 30 December 1985 in Hassle Parish in Mariestad Municipality, Sweden. The funeral service was held on 7 January 1986 in Enåsa Church in Lyrestad Parish, Mariestad Municipality. He was buried the same day at Enåsa Cemetery.

In an obituary, Ambassador Sven Dahlman described Ribbing as "one of Swedish diplomacy's foremost experts on Hispanic America. He was a conscientious and perceptive observer, wise and judicious, loyal to his friends, and somewhat reserved by nature. Skeptical of grandiose words and gestures."

== Awards and decorations ==
=== Swedish ===
- (Sweden) Grand Cross of the Order of the Polar Star (6 June 1961)
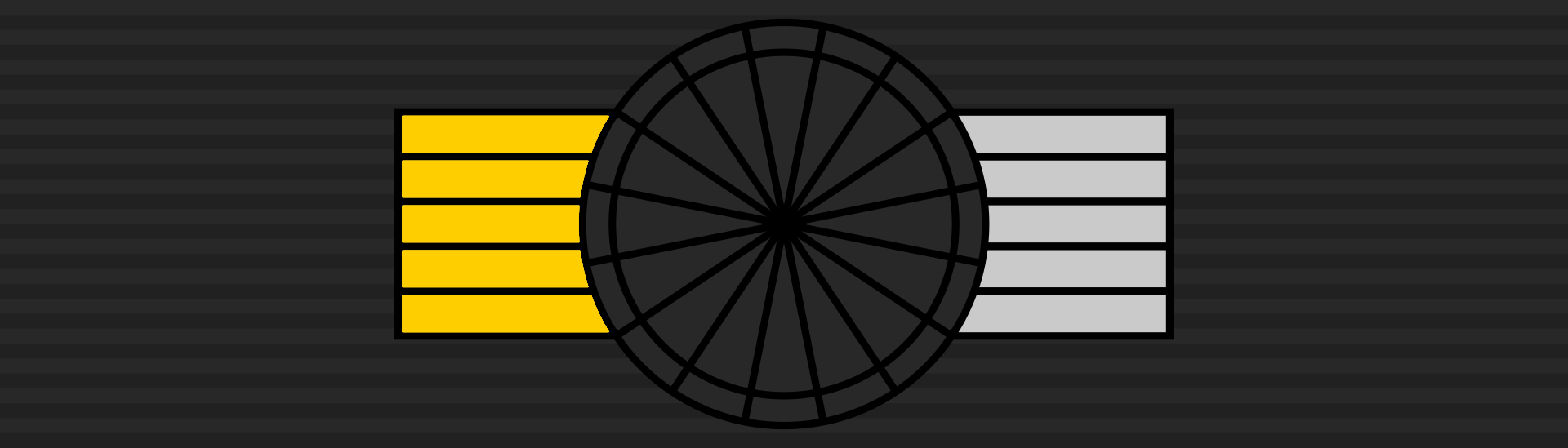
- (Sweden) Commander 1st Class of the Order of the Polar Star (6 June 1951)
- (Sweden) Commander of the Order of the Polar Star (6 June 1947)
- (Sweden) Knight of the Order of the Polar Star (1937)

=== Foreign ===
- (Argentina) Grand Cross of the Order of Merit
- (Mexico) Sash of the Order of the Aztec Eagle
- (Spain) Grand Cross of the Order of Isabella the Catholic
- (Socialist Federal Republic of Yugoslavia) Grand Officer of the Order of St. Sava
- (Belgium) Commander of the Order of Leopold II
- Commander of the Order of the White Rose of Finland
- Knight 1st Class of the Order of the White Rose of Finland (December 1932)
- (France) Officer of the Legion of Honour
- (France) Officer of the Order of the Black Star (1925)
- (Latvia) Officer of the Order of the Three Stars (29 June 1929)

Diplomatic posts
Preceded by Vilhelm Assarsson	Envoy of Sweden to Mexico; 1943–1949	Succeeded by Claes Westring
Preceded by Vilhelm Assarsson	Envoy of Sweden to Costa Rica; 1943–1949	Succeeded by Claes Westring
Preceded by Vilhelm Assarsson	Envoy of Sweden to Guatemala; 1943–1949	Succeeded by Claes Westring
Preceded by Vilhelm Assarsson	Envoy of Sweden to El Salvador; 1943–1949	Succeeded by Claes Westring
Preceded by Vilhelm Assarsson	Envoy of Sweden to Honduras; 1943–1949	Succeeded by Claes Westring
Preceded by Vilhelm Assarsson	Envoy of Sweden to Nicaragua; 1943–1949	Succeeded by Claes Westring
Preceded by Vilhelm Assarsson	Envoy of Sweden to Panama; 1943–1949	Succeeded by Ragnvald Bagge
Preceded by Carl Olof Gisle	Envoy/Ambassador of Sweden to Argentina; 1949–1958	Succeeded by Carl-Herbert Borgenstierna
Preceded by Carl Olof Gisle	Envoy/Ambassador of Sweden to Paraguay; 1949–1958	Succeeded by Carl-Herbert Borgenstierna
Preceded by Carl Olof Gisle	Envoy of Sweden to Uruguay; 1949–1949	Succeeded by Carl-Herbert Borgenstierna as Charge d'affaires en pied
Preceded by Wilhelm Winther	Ambassador of Sweden to Spain; 1958–1963	Succeeded by Carl-Herbert Borgenstierna
