= Claes Westring =

Swedish diplomat (1893–1975)

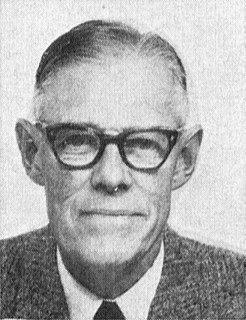
- Born: Claes Adolf Hjalmar Westring; 30 January 1893; Stockholm, Sweden
- Died: 12 November 1975 (aged 82); Lima, Peru
- Education: Nya elementarskolan
- Alma mater: Uppsala University
- Occupation: Diplomat
- Years active: 1916–1959
- Spouse(s): Evelyn Dieden (m. 1927; div. 1949) Elisabeth Spens (m. 1951, divorced)
- Children: 2
- Relatives: Gustaf Adolf Westring (brother)

Claes Adolf Hjalmar Westring (30 January 1893 – 12 November 1975) was a Swedish diplomat and jurist with a long career in the Swedish Foreign Ministry, serving across Europe, Latin America, and Scandinavia. After graduating in law from Uppsala University in 1916, he worked in the judiciary before joining the Foreign Ministry in 1918. He held early postings in Antwerp, Warsaw, Berlin, and Copenhagen, and later senior legal and administrative roles in Stockholm, including heading key departments and working in international legal commissions. He also served as chargé d'affaires ad interim in Kaunas, Lithuania (1936–1940).

During World War II, Westring was Consul General in Oslo (1941–1945). In this role, he operated under German occupation and was involved in sensitive diplomatic negotiations with occupation authorities, including issues concerning Swedish protection and citizenship claims for vulnerable individuals. He also contributed to humanitarian and rescue efforts linked to broader Swedish and Allied initiatives, and worked to counter attempts by the Quisling regime to gain control over the Norwegian Nobel Institute.

After the war, he served as envoy in Warsaw (1945–1949), Mexico City (1949–1952), and Lima (1952–1959), with concurrent accreditation to several Central American states and Bolivia.

== Early life ==
Westring was born on 30 January 1893 in Stockholm, Sweden, the son of the president of the Court of Appeal Hjalmar Westring (1857–1926) and his wife, Countess Adélaide Stackelberg. He was the brother of Lieutenant General Gustaf Adolf Westring (1900–1963) and the physician Lennart Westring (1897–1979).

He graduated from Nya elementarskolan in Stockholm in 1911. He received a Candidate of Law degree from Uppsala University in 1916.

== Career ==
=== Early diplomatic career ===
Westring completed his judicial clerkship and served as a district court judge in the Central Halland Judicial District from 1916 to 1918. In 1918, he joined the Ministry for Foreign Affairs as an attaché, becoming second secretary in 1919. He then served as vice consul in Antwerp (1919–1920), second legation secretary in Warsaw (1920–1922), and administrative officer (byråsekreterare) at the Foreign Ministry in 1922.

He went on to hold several diplomatic posts, including first legation secretary in Berlin (1923–1925) and Copenhagen (1925–1928). During the same period, he also acted as secretary to the chairman of the International Commission for the Codification of International Law (1925–1928) and assisted Sweden's delegation in the International Oder Commission (1925–1936). In 1928, he became first secretary at the Foreign Ministry, later heading the Inheritance and Compensation Office in 1930 and the Legal Office from 1931 to 1936. He also chaired the Relief Committee for Swedes in Russia (Understödsnämnden för rysslandssvenskar) between 1934 and 1936. Finally, he served as chargé d'affaires ad interim in Kaunas, Lithuania, from 1936 to 1940.

=== Service in Norway (1941–1945) ===
In the summer of 1940, Sweden was forbidden by Berlin from maintaining either a diplomatic mission or a head of mission in Oslo. From 1941, however, it was permitted to establish a consulate general in Oslo. Westring was appointed Consul General in Oslo that same year, a position he held until 1945. Working from Oslo, Westring acted under instructions from director-general for legal affairs Gösta Engzell, who played a central role in shaping Sweden's evolving refugee policy and diplomatic interventions. In this capacity, Westring was engaged in continuous negotiations with German occupation authorities, including SS officials such as Horst Wagner, with the aim of securing the transfer or recognition of Swedish citizenship for threatened Norwegian Jews. This legal and diplomatic strategy was part of a broader Swedish approach in which citizenship claims and consular protection were used as practical tools to shield individuals from deportation. Westring's work in Oslo thus formed an important operational link in a wider network of Swedish diplomatic efforts that combined legal argumentation, administrative pressure, and persistent bilateral contacts. Westring used his contacts and energetic diplomatic activity to secure the release of several interned Norwegians, including prominent cultural figures such as the painters Henrik Sørensen and Reidar Aulie.

Westring played a significant supporting role in the operations initiated by the War Refugee Board, the American agency established in 1944 to aid victims of Nazi persecution. According to contemporary reports by Iver C. Olsen, the Board's representative in Stockholm, Westring was "of great assistance" in the rescue work carried out in Norway. These efforts formed part of a broader network of evacuation and relief operations across Scandinavia and the Baltic region, through which thousands of refugees were brought to safety in Sweden.

Westring also became an important intermediary between the Norwegian Nobel Institute, the Nobel Foundation in Sweden, and the occupying authorities. In 1944, when the collaborationist government of Vidkun Quisling attempted to take control of the Norwegian Nobel Committee and its institute, Westring played a key diplomatic role in resisting this effort. He argued that the Nobel Institute and its assets were legally the property of the Swedish-based Nobel Foundation, and therefore outside the jurisdiction of the Norwegian authorities under occupation. Westring maintained a firm stance in negotiations with representatives of the Quisling regime, delaying and ultimately preventing their attempts to interfere with the Institute's operations. He also coordinated closely with officials in Stockholm and supported measures to safeguard sensitive documents and property. The conflict was eventually defused in part because German occupation authorities considered the issue of minor importance and chose not to support Quisling's intervention. Westring himself concluded that this effectively ended the attempts to seize control of the Nobel Institution.

=== Later career ===
Westring then served as envoy in Warsaw (1945–1949), in Mexico City (1949–1952), with concurrent accreditation to Guatemala City, Managua, San José, San Salvador, and Tegucigalpa, and in Lima (1952–1959), with additional accreditation to La Paz from 1952 to 1956.

== Personal life ==
On 3 December 1927, at the Swedish Church in Paris, Westring married Maud Evelyn Dieden (1905–1973), daughter of director Theodor Dieden and his first wife, née Fürstenau. They had two children: Claes-Bertil (1932–2004) and Maud (born 1935).

On 25 April 1951 in Guatemala, Westring married Countess Elisabeth Spens, daughter of Countess Hertha Spens (née Södermark) and former cavalry captain Count Harald Spens of Stockholm. Elisabeth was the widow of lawyer Vadime Dzeroginski.

After serving as ambassador in Lima, Peru, until 1959, Westring settled there. Four years later, on 15 March 1963, his brother Lieutenant General Gustaf Adolf Westring died in a plane crash when the aircraft he was traveling in struck Mount Chachacomani, Bolivia, killing all 36 passengers and three crew members. Westring and colleague Lars Gunnar Nilsson, who also died in the accident, were working for AB Atlas Copco at the time. Westring later brought his brother's remains back to Sweden on 26 March.

== Death ==
Westring died on 12 November 1975 in Lima, Peru.

== Awards and decorations ==
=== Swedish ===
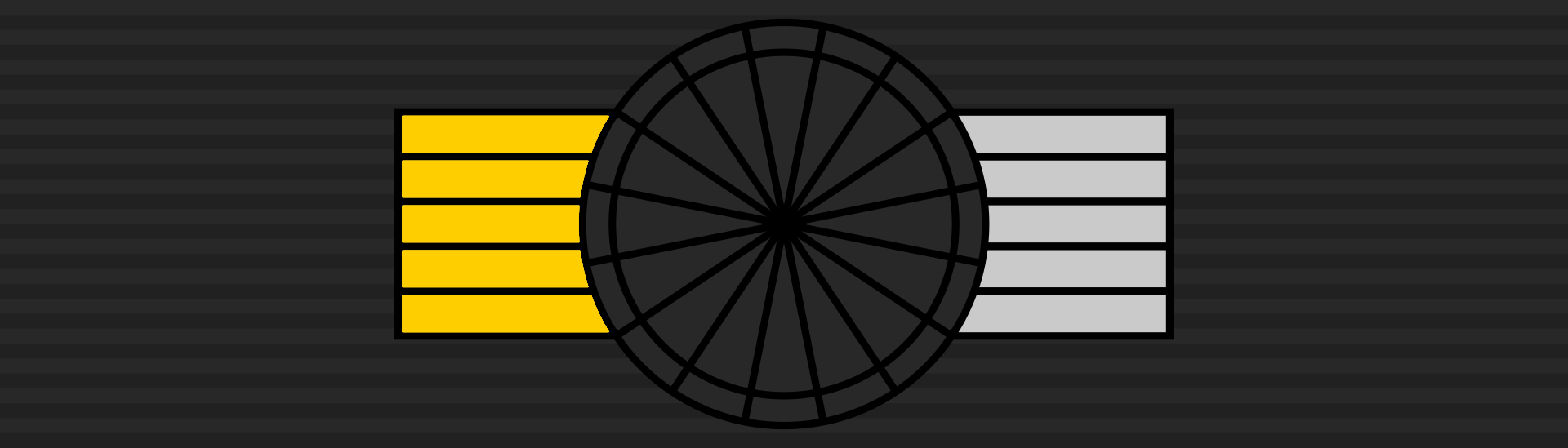
- (Sweden) Commander 1st Class of the Order of the Polar Star (6 June 1952)
- (Sweden) Commander of the Order of the Polar Star (6 June 1945)
- (Sweden) Knight of the Order of the Polar Star (1934)

=== Foreign ===
- (Mexico) Sash of the Order of the Aztec Eagle
- Grand Officer of the Order of the Sun of Peru
- (Lithuania) Grand Officer of the Order of the Lithuanian Grand Duke Gediminas
- (Norway) Commander with Star of the Order of St. Olav (August 1945)
- (Belgium) Commander of the Order of the Crown
- (Denmark) Commander of the Order of the Dannebrog
- (Netherlands) Commander of the Order of Orange-Nassau
- (Kingdom of Romania) Commander of the Order of the Star of Romania
- (Tsardom of Bulgaria (1908–1946)) Officer of the Order of Civil Merit
- (Poland) Officer of the Order of Polonia Restituta
- Knight of the Order of the White Rose of Finland

Diplomatic posts
Preceded by None¹	Consul General of Sweden in Oslo; 1941–1945	Succeeded by None¹
Preceded by Joen Lagerberg	Envoy of Sweden to Poland; 1945–1949	Succeeded by Gösta Engzell
Preceded by Herbert Ribbing	Envoy of Sweden to Mexico; 1949–1952	Succeeded by Sven Grafström
Preceded by Herbert Ribbing	Envoy of Sweden to Costa Rica; 1949–1952	Succeeded by Sven Grafström
Preceded by Herbert Ribbing	Envoy of Sweden to El Salvador; 1949–1952	Succeeded by Sven Grafström
Preceded by Herbert Ribbing	Envoy of Sweden to Guatemala; 1949–1952	Succeeded by Sven Grafström
Preceded by Herbert Ribbing	Envoy of Sweden to Honduras; 1949–1952	Succeeded by Sven Grafström
Preceded by Herbert Ribbing	Envoy of Sweden to Nicaragua; 1949–1952	Succeeded by Sven Grafström
Preceded by Harry Eriksson	Envoy/Ambassador of Sweden to Peru; 1952–1959	Succeeded by Malte Pripp
Preceded by Harry Eriksson	Envoy of Sweden to Bolivia; 1952–1956	Succeeded by Harry Bagge
Notes and references
1. Jonas Aspelin was honorary consul (1924–1929) and later honorary consul general (1929–1954). Aside from Claes Westring, Sweden did not post any career consul general there.
