= List of ambassadors of Sweden to Mexico =

Ambassador of Sweden to Mexico
- Lesser coat of arms of the Kingdom of Sweden
- Incumbent; Pernilla Josefsson-Lazo since August 2026
- Ministry for Foreign Affairs; Swedish Embassy, Mexico City
- Style: His or Her Excellency (formal); Mr. or Madam Ambassador (informal)
- Reports to: Minister for Foreign Affairs
- Residence: Paseo de las Palmas 1215, Lomas de Chapultepec (Note: The ambassador's residence is at the same location as the chancery.)
- Seat: Mexico City, Mexico
- Appointer: Government of Sweden
- Term length: No fixed term
- Inaugural holder: Wilhelm af Wetterstedt
- Formation: 1864
- Website: Swedish Embassy, Mexico City

The Ambassador of Sweden to Mexico (known formally as the Ambassador of the Kingdom of Sweden to the United Mexican States) is the official representative of the government of Sweden to the president of Mexico and government of Mexico.

== History ==
Sweden and Mexico have had diplomatic relations since 1850. An Honorary Consulate General in Mexico City was established by royal decree on 18 December 1885. During the parliamentary session of 1913, a decision was made to establish a salaried Consulate General, whose holder also served as chargé d'affaires.

In a report on the reorganization of the Ministry for Foreign Affairs in early January 1921, the experts recommended a proposal from the Swedish chargé d'affaires in Mexico to extend the mission's area of responsibility to the Central American states, British Honduras, as well as Cuba, Venezuela, Colombia, Haiti, and San Domingo, along with the British, French, Dutch, and American possessions in the West Indies. In May 1921, the Committee of Supply approved the establishment of a new permanent mission in Mexico. The consulate general was converted into a legation after the King in Council, on 30 September 1921, appointed the Swedish consul general and chargé d'affaires in Mexico as minister to both Mexico and Havana.

In 1956, an agreement was reached between the Swedish and Mexican governments on the mutual elevation of the respective countries' legations to embassies. The diplomatic rank was thereafter changed to ambassador instead of envoy extraordinary and minister plenipotentiary.

== List of representatives ==
Name	Period	Title	Notes	Ref
Wilhelm af Wetterstedt	3 October 1864 – ?	Envoy		
Folke Cronholm	31 December 1913 – 1916	Consul general & chargé d'affaires		
Gylfe Anderberg	23 February 1917 – 30 September 1921	Consul general & chargé d'affaires (Note: Anderberg served as acting consul general and chargé d'affaires until he became the regular consul general and chargé d'affaires through a cabinet decision on 21 December 1917.)	Also served as Consul General in Rio de Janeiro from autumn 1919 to 1920.	
Gylfe Anderberg	30 September 1921 – 1 February 1938	Acting envoy	Also accredited to Guatemala City (1930–1937), Havana (1921–1937), Managua (1936–1937), Panama City (1930–1937), San José (1936–1937), San Salvador (1936–1937), and Tegucigalpa (1936–1937).	
Axel Paulin	1924–1924	Chargé d'affaires	Also accredited to Havana.	
Vilhelm Assarsson	1929–1930	Chargé d'affaires		
Vilhelm Assarsson	1 February 1938 – 1940	Envoy	Also accredited to Havana, Managua, Panama City, San José, Guatemala City, San Salvador, and Tegucigalpa.	
Rolf Arfwedson	1940–1943	Chargé d'affaires ad interim		
Gösta Brunnström	1942–1942	Chargé d'affaires ad interim		
Herbert Ribbing	1943–1949	Envoy	Also accredited to Guatemala City, Managua, Panama City, San José, San Salvador, and Tegucigalpa.	
Claes Westring	1949–1952	Envoy	Also accredited to Guatemala City, Managua, San José, San Salvador, and Tegucigalpa.	
Sven Grafström	6 June 1952 – 3 January 1955 (Note: However, the service in Mexico was interrupted for six months in 1953, when Grafström, with the rank of major general, became the first Swedish representative in the Neutral Nations Supervisory Commission in Korea.)	Envoy	Also accredited to Guatemala City, Managua, San José, San Salvador, and Tegucigalpa. Died in office. (Note: Grafström was found on 3 January 1955, on the railway line two km from Joigny, 140 km southeast of Paris, France. Grafström was on his way to Paris and from there to continue by plane to Mexico City.)	
Stig Engfeldt	1955–1955	Chargé d'affaires ad interim		
Lennart Nylander	1955–1956	Envoy	Also accredited to Guatemala City, Managua, San José, San Salvador, and Tegucigalpa.	
Lennart Nylander	1956–1962	Ambassador	Also accredited to Guatemala City, Managua, San José, San Salvador, and Tegucigalpa.	
Tord Göransson	1962–1969	Ambassador	Also accredited to Guatemala City (1962–1964), Havana (1964–1969), Managua (1962–1964), San José (1962–1964), San Salvador (1962–1964), and Tegucigalpa (1962–1964).	
Carl-Henric Nauckhoff	1969–1972	Ambassador	Also accredited to Havana.	
Carl Swartz	1972–1980	Ambassador		
Karl-Anders Wollter	1980–1985	Ambassador		
David Wirmark	1985–1991	Ambassador		
Bo Henrikson	1992–1996	Ambassador		
Karin Ehnbom-Palmquist	1997–2000	Ambassador		
Jan Ståhl	2000–2001	Chargé d'affaires		
Ewa Polano	2001–2006	Ambassador		
Anna Lindstedt	2006–2011	Ambassador		
Jörgen Persson	2012–2016	Ambassador		
Annika Thunborg	September 2016 – 2021	Ambassador		
Gunnar Aldén	2021–2026	Ambassador		
Pernilla Josefsson-Lazo	August 2026 – present	Ambassador		

== See also ==
- Mexico–Sweden relations
- Embassy of Sweden, Mexico City
