= List of ambassadors of Sweden to Guatemala =

Ambassador of Sweden to Guatemala
- Lesser coat of arms of the Kingdom of Sweden
- Incumbent; Pontus Rosenberg since 2024
- Ministry for Foreign Affairs; Swedish Embassy, Guatemala City
- Style: His or Her Excellency (formal); Mr. or Madam Ambassador (informal)
- Reports to: Minister for Foreign Affairs
- Residence: 19 Calle 8-24 zona 14 la Cañada
- Seat: Guatemala City, Guatemala
- Appointer: Government of Sweden
- Term length: No fixed term
- Inaugural holder: Gylfe Anderberg
- Formation: 1930
- Website: Swedish Embassy, Guatemala City

The Ambassador of Sweden to Guatemala (known formally as the Ambassador of the Kingdom of Sweden to the Republic of Guatemala) is the official representative of the government of Sweden to the president of Guatemala and government of Guatemala.

== History ==
In March 1930, the King in Council appointed Sweden's envoy in Mexico City, Gylfe Anderberg, as envoy to Guatemala as well. On 29 May 1930, Anderberg presented his credentials to Guatemala's President, Lázaro Chacón González.

On 22 March 1963, a proposal was submitted to the parliament suggesting the establishment of a Swedish mission in Guatemala, which would operate in the Central American republics.

In January 1964, Arne Björnberg, Director General of the Swedish Agency for International Assistance (Nämnden för internationellt bistånd, Nib), was appointed as Sweden's first resident ambassador to Guatemala. In a council meeting on 20 March, he was also appointed ambassador to Managua, San José, San Salvador, and Tegucigalpa. On 19 May of the same year, Björnberg arrived in Guatemala. Until then, the Swedish ambassador in Mexico City had been responsible for Guatemala and the other Central American nations.

The ambassador has been accredited to various neighboring countries during different periods: Beliz (1994–present), Costa Rica (1964–1983, 2001–present), El Salvador (1964–1981, 1983–present), Honduras (1964–present), Nicaragua (1964–1983, 2008–present), and Panama (2010–present).

== List of representatives ==
Name	Period	Title	Notes	Ref
Gylfe Anderberg	1930–1937	Envoy	Resident in Mexico City.	
Vilhelm Assarsson	1938–1940	Envoy	Resident in Mexico City.	
–	1941–1943	–	Vacant	
Herbert Ribbing	1943–1949	Envoy	Resident in Mexico City.	
Claes Westring	1949–1952	Envoy	Resident in Mexico City.	
Sven Grafström	1952 – 3 January 1955 (Note: However, the service in Mexico was interrupted for six months in 1953, when Grafström, with the rank of major general, became the first Swedish representative in the Neutral Nations Supervisory Commission in Korea.)	Envoy	Resident in Mexico City. Died in office. (Note: Grafström was found on 3 January 1955, on the railway line two km from Joigny, 140 km southeast of Paris, France. Grafström was on his way to Paris and from there to continue by plane to Mexico City.)	
Lennart Nylander	1955–1956	Envoy	Resident in Mexico City.	
Lennart Nylander	1956–1962	Ambassador	Resident in Mexico City.	
Tord Göransson	1962–1964	Ambassador	Resident in Mexico City.	
Arne Björnberg	1964–1969	Ambassador	Also accredited in Managua, San José, San Salvador, and Tegucigalpa.	
Harald Edelstam	1969–1972	Ambassador	Also accredited in Managua, San José, San Salvador, and Tegucigalpa.	
Claës König	1972–1976	Ambassador	Also accredited in Managua, San José, San Salvador, and Tegucigalpa.	
Arne Helleryd	1976–1978	Ambassador	Also accredited in Managua, San José, San Salvador, and Tegucigalpa.	
Henrik Ramel	1978–1981	Ambassador	Also accredited in Managua (from 1979), San José, San Salvador, and Tegucigalpa.	
Carl-Erhard Lindahl	1981–1983	Ambassador	Also accredited in Managua, San José, and Tegucigalpa.	
Krister Göranson	1983–1986	Ambassador	Also accredited in San Salvador (from 1986) and Tegucigalpa.	
Peter Landelius	1987–1989	Ambassador	Also accredited in San Salvador and Tegucigalpa.	
Ulf Lewin	1989–1994	Ambassador	Also accredited in San Salvador and Tegucigalpa.	
Staffan Wrigstad	1994–2000	Ambassador	Also accredited in Belmopan (from 1997), San Salvador, and Tegucigalpa.	
Maria Leissner	2000–2004	Ambassador	Also accredited in Belmopan, San José (from 2001), San Salvador, and Tegucigalpa.	
Eivor Halkjaer	2004–2006	Ambassador	Also accredited in Belmopan, San José, San Salvador, and Tegucigalpa.	
Ewa Werner-Dahlin	2006–2010	Ambassador	Also accredited in Belmopan, Managua (from 2008), San José, San Salvador, and Tegucigalpa.	
Michael Frühling	2010–2014	Ambassador	Also accredited in Managua, Panama City, San José, San Salvador, and Tegucigalpa.	
Georg Andrén	2014 – 31 August 2017	Ambassador	Also accredited to Belmopan (from 2017), Managua, Panama City, San José, San Salvador, and Tegucigalpa.	
Martin Hessel	1 September 2017 – December 2017	Chargé d'affaires ad interim		
Anders Kompass	December 2017 – 2020	Ambassador	Also accredited to Belmopan, Managua, Panama City, San José, San Salvador, and Tegucigalpa.	
Hans Magnusson	1 September 2020 – 2024	Ambassador	Also accredited in Belmopan (until 2022), Managua, Panama City, San José, San Salvador, and Tegucigalpa.	
Pontus Rosenberg	2024–present	Ambassador	Also accredited in Managua, Panama City, San José, San Salvador, and Tegucigalpa.	
