= Claës Bonde =

Swedish diplomat (1878–1965)

Count Claës Bonde
- Born: 4 March 1878; Vingåker, Sweden
- Died: 6 April 1965 (aged 87); Stockholm, Sweden
- Education: Uppsala University
- Occupation: Diplomat
- Years active: 1904–1950s
- Spouse: Lilian du Plessis de Richelieu (m. 1922; div. 1931)
- Relatives: Andreas du Plessis de Richelieu (father-in-law)

Count Claës Bonde af Björnö (4 March 1878 – 6 April 1965) was a Swedish diplomat and courtier. He studied law at Uppsala University and began his career in the Swedish diplomatic service in 1904, with early assignments as an attaché in London and Paris. He subsequently served at the Ministry for Foreign Affairs, where he advanced from second secretary to first secretary.

Bonde held a series of diplomatic and consular posts abroad, including legation secretary in Washington, D.C., and assignments in New York City and Chicago. He later served in Kristiania (Oslo), Paris, Copenhagen, Tokyo, Beijing, and London, holding senior diplomatic positions and serving several times as chargé d'affaires ad interim. In 1927, he was placed at the disposal of the government and granted the title of resident minister.

From 1938 to 1950, Bonde served as private secretary to King Gustaf V. He was also appointed lord-in-waiting (kabinettskammarherre) in 1938, marking the final stage of a career that combined Swedish diplomatic service with senior duties at the royal court.

== Early life ==
Claës Bonde was born into the noble Bonde af Björnö family on 4 March 1878 at Kjesäter Manor in Vingåker Municipality, Södermanland County, Sweden. He was the son of Count Carl Trolle-Bonde (1843–1912), a farmer, writer, and politician, and his wife, Baroness Eva Fredrika Emerentia Leijonhufvud (born 1848). His maternal grandfather was Baron Axel Gabriel Leijonhufvud (1812–1897), a lord-in-waiting and major general, while his paternal grandfather was Count Gustaf Trolle-Bonde (1802–1884), a military officer and courtier.

Bonde had five brothers, (Note: His five brothers were: Chamberlain Gustaf Carl Trolle Bonde (born 1868); Chamberlain Christer Bonde (born 1869); Tord Axel Bonde (born and died 1873); the agronomist Philip Bonde (1876–1959); and Fredrik Gustaf Bonde (born 1879).) including the agronomist Philip Bonde (1876–1959), and seven sisters, (Note: His seven sisters were: Eva Julia Ulrika Elisabet (born 1870); Vivika Sigrid Ebba Sofia (born 1871); Märta Augusta Eleonora Margareta (1874–1958); Sigrid Brita Fredrika Beata (born 1881); Elisabet Charlotta Anna Christina (born 1883); Margareta Magdalena Vilhelmina Emerentia (born 1887); and a stillborn sister (born and died 1894).) including the lady-in-waiting Märta Palmstierna (1874–1958). Through his sister Märta, he was the maternal uncle of the miniature painter and illustrator Brita Palmstierna-von Post (1905–1984).

He passed his matriculation examination in Lund in 1897, followed by a preliminary legal-philosophical examination (juridiskt-filosofisk examen) on 27 May 1898. On 30 January 1904, he received his Doctor of both laws (Juris utriusque kandidat) degree from Uppsala University.

== Career ==
Bonde began his career as an extra-ordinarie notarie (assistant judicial clerk) at the Svea Court of Appeal in 1904 and at the Stockholm City Court on 6 February 1904. He was appointed attaché in London on 15 March 1904 and in Paris on 4 November 1904. On 20 May 1905, he became acting second secretary at the Ministry for Foreign Affairs, and was appointed second secretary there on 28 September 1906 and first secretary on 29 June 1908. On 26 April 1912, Bonde was appointed legation secretary in Washington, D.C., serving as chargé d'affaires ad interim from 18 July to 9 December 1913. He was acting consul general in New York City from 8 December 1914 to 12 February 1915, and acting consul in Chicago from 3 March to 15 October 1916.

On 15 December 1916, he was appointed legation secretary in Kristiania (present-day Oslo), and was granted the title, rank, and dignity of legation counsellor on the same date. He served as chargé d'affaires ad interim there at various times between 9 March 1917 and 1 June 1918. On 22 July 1918, Bonde became first legation secretary in Paris, while also serving as acting legation secretary in London from 22 July to 9 December 1918. In 1919, he was appointed acting first legation secretary in Copenhagen on 12 September, and served as chargé d'affaires ad interim there at various times between 18 December 1919 and 31 December 1921. On 26 September 1921, Bonde was appointed legation counsellor in Tokyo and Beijing, and in June 1924 he was appointed legation counsellor in London.

In 1927, Bonde was placed for service without a current diplomatic posting and was granted the title of resident minister. From 1938 to 1950, he served as King Gustaf V's private secretary, and in 1938 he was appointed lord-in-waiting (kabinettskammarherre).

== Personal life ==
At the age of 44, Bonde married 18-year-old Lilian Agnete du Plessis de Richelieu on 17 January 1922 at Holmen Church in Copenhagen. Born on 2 February 1903 in Copenhagen, Denmark, she was the daughter of the Danish chamberlain and Vice Admiral of the Imperial Siamese Navy, Andreas du Plessis de Richelieu, and Dagmar Terese Louise Lerche. The couple divorced in 1931.

== Death ==
Bonde died on 6 April 1965 in Oscar Parish, Stockholm, Sweden. He was buried later that year at Torrlösa Cemetery in Torrlösa, just outside Svalöv in Scania, southern Sweden.

== Awards and decorations ==
=== Swedish ===
- (Sweden) King Gustaf V's Jubilee Commemorative Medal (1948)
- (Sweden) King Gustaf V's Commemorative Medal (1951)
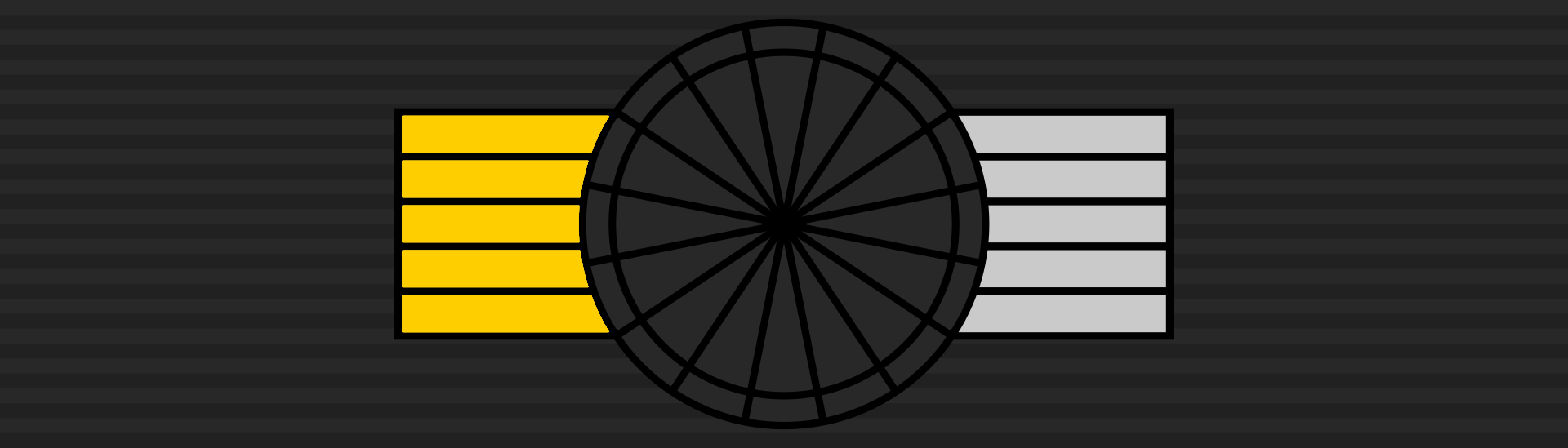
- (Sweden) Commander 1st Class of the Order of the Polar Star (6 June 1941)
- (Sweden) Commander of the Order of the Polar Star (6 June 1938)
- (Sweden) Knight of the Order of the Polar Star (6 June 1916)

=== Foreign ===
- (France) Grand Cross of the Order of the Black Star
- (Belgium) Grand Officer of the Order of the Crown
- (Denmark) Commander 1st Class of the Order of the Dannebrog
- (Monaco) Grand Officer of the Order of Saint Charles
- (Republic of China (1912–1949)) 2nd Class of the Order of the Precious Brilliant Golden Grain
- (France) Commander of the Legion of Honour
- (Denmark) Commander of the Order of the Dannebrog (25 October 1920)
- (Norway) Commander of the Order of St. Olav (28 November 1917)
- (Russian Empire) Knight 2nd Class of the Order of Saint Stanislaus (1911)
- (Ottoman Empire) 3rd Class of the Order of the Medjidie (1907)
- (Grand Duchy of Baden) Knight of the Order of Berthold the First (1909)
- (Portugal) Knight of the Military Order of Christ (1907)
- (Russian Empire) Knight 3rd Class of the Order of Saint Anna

== Honours ==
- Herald of the Order of the Seraphim (Kunglig Majestäts Orden)

== Footnotes ==
Diplomatic posts
Preceded by Magnus Clarholm	Acting Consul General of Sweden to New York City; 1914–1915	Succeeded by Sven Magnusson Lagerberg
Preceded by Gylfe Anderberg	Acting Consul of Sweden to Chicago; 1916–1916	Succeeded by Einar Ekstrand
