= David Assarsson =

Swedish Roman Catholic priest (1892-1955)

Berndt David Assarsson (14 January 1892 – 31 December 1955) was a Swedish Catholic priest, monsignor, historical author and psalmist who resided in Helsingborg and Stockholm. He made efforts to develop Roman Catholicism in Sweden. He was born in Lund and died in Helsingborg. He was the brother of diplomat Vilhelm Assarsson.

== Career ==
He wrote the book Fädernas kyrka: En programskrift (1918). In 1920 he agreed to edit the Catholic magazine Credo and served as its editor until 1937. In 1922 he translated John Henry Newman's "Lead, Kindly Light" to Swedish "Led, milda ljus." He was editor of Psalmer för kyrkoåret ("psalms for the Church") in 1937, and of the 1950 edition of the Cecilia psalm book. He worked against the Swedish ban on creating Catholic monasteries, making reference to public statements about freedom of religion and to Norway and Denmark's allowance of such monasteries.

== Publications ==
- Fädernas kyrka: En programskrift. Stockholm, 1918.
- Det skånska problemet. Stockholm, 1923.
- Den katolska kyrkan i Sverige i närvarande tid. Stockholm, 1925.
- Katolska kyrkan i Sverige. Uppsala, 1938.
- Skånelands historia i Skånelands skolor. Lund, 1949.
- Katolska kyrkan i Sverige. Göteborg, 1953.
