= Anders Kompass =

Swedish diplomat and former UN official

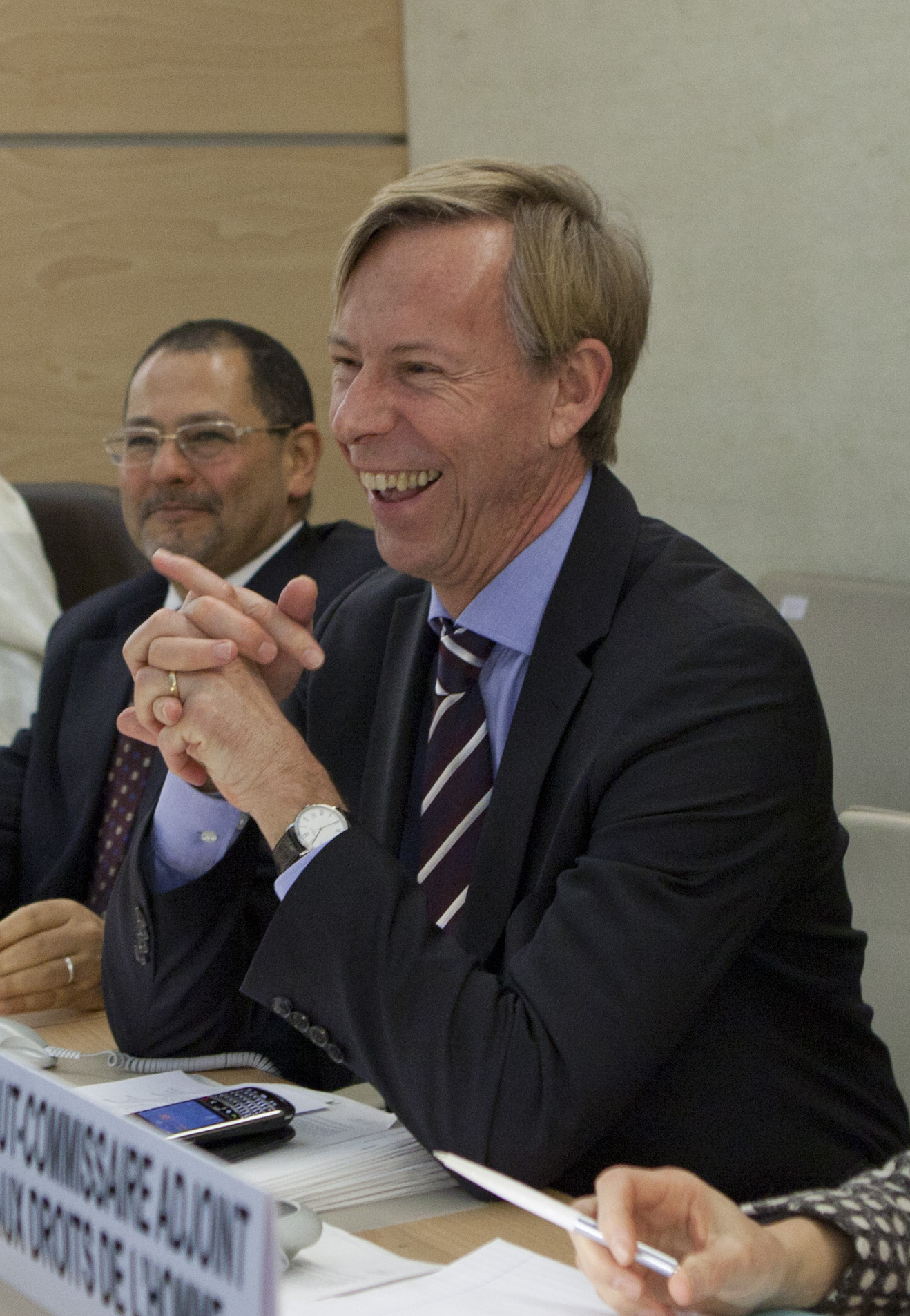

Sweden Ambassador to Guatemala
- Incumbent
- Assumed office 5 December 2017
- Monarch: Carl XVI Gustaf
- Prime Minister: Stefan Löfven
- Preceded by: Georg Andrén

Personal details
- Born: Per Anders Gunnar Kompass; 25 August 1955 (age 70) Karlskoga, Sweden

Per Anders Gunnar Kompass (born 25 August 1955) is a Swedish diplomat and former UN official. He worked as the field operations director at the Office of the United Nations High Commissioner for Human Rights (OHCHR) between 2009 and 2016.

== Career ==
=== Early career ===
Kompass career began in 1983 when he was appointed first secretary at the Swedish Embassy in Mexico City. In this role, he was responsible for humanitarian aid in Central America and also served as chargé d'affaires in El Salvador. Three years later, in 1986, he returned to Sweden as a desk officer at the Ministry for Foreign Affairs in Stockholm, where he oversaw development cooperation with Latin America. By 1990, he was working in the Political Department of the foreign ministry, focusing on Latin American affairs.

=== United Nations ===
In 1992, Kompass transitioned to the United Nations, becoming head of the United Nations Development Programme (UNDP) in El Salvador and Belize. He returned to Sweden in 1996 to take up the role of Ambassador for Migration Issues at the foreign ministry in Stockholm. The following year, in 1997, he was appointed Director at the Americas Department of the foreign ministry, further solidifying his expertise in Latin American affairs.

Kompass deep engagement with human rights work intensified when, in 1999, he became Head of the UN Office for Human Rights in Colombia. This was followed by similar leadership positions within the UN human rights offices in Mexico (2002) and Guatemala (2005). In 2009, he was appointed Chief of Field Operations at the Office of the United Nations High Commissioner for Human Rights in Geneva, overseeing global fieldwork related to human rights monitoring and advocacy.

==== Whistleblower ====
Kompass acted as a whistleblower when he advised French authorities about a report on child sexual abuse carried out by French Peacekeepers in the Central African Republic between December 2013 and July 2014. The French authorities rapidly took action to investigate the allegations in the report. The investigations of fourteen soldiers are still ongoing. However, the OHCHR chief, Prince Zeid bin Ra'ad, found that Anders Kompass had breached the OHCHR rules of conduct by not seeking the approval of his superior prior to passing on the report to the French. Prince Zeid also stated that the report included names and addresses of victims of the abuse, thereby putting them at risk for stigma and retaliation in their home communities. Therefore, he suspended Kompass from his position. However, the suspension was found to be unlawful by the United Nations Dispute Tribunal on 6 May 2015. Prince Zeid then proposed to dismantle the field operations unit of the OHCHR, which effectively would have removed Kompass' position from the organization. Meanwhile, the United States and other member states criticized the UN leadership for seeming to spend more efforts on discrediting Kompass for disclosing the sexual abuses rather than on holding the abusers themselves accountable for their crimes.

On 22 June 2015, after much criticism in the media, the UN Secretary-General Ban Ki-moon appointed an independent panel to investigate the matter. The UN panel cleared Anders Kompass from any wrongdoing and concluded that he did indeed have the authority to share the information in the report with the French authorities. The panel also found that the concerns of risks to the victims by including their identities in the report had been largely exaggerated.

On 8 June 2016, Kompass announced his resignation from the United Nations, citing "the complete impunity for those who have been found to have, in various degrees, abused their authority, together with the unwillingness of the hierarchy to express any regrets for the way they acted towards me".

=== Later career ===
After nearly two decades with the UN, Kompass returned to Sweden in 2016 to serve as a Senior Advisor at the foreign ministry in Stockholm. On 12 October 2017, Kompass was appointed Swedish ambassador to Guatemala.

== Personal life ==
On 25 February 1985, Kompass became engaged to Carmen Bascon in La Paz, Bolivia. He later married Flaminia Minelli (born 1971), a UN official from Italy. He has one son from a previous marriage.

== Awards and decorations ==
- (Sweden) Stig Dagerman Prize (2017)
- (Nicaragua) Grand Cross of the Order of José de Marcoleta (3 September 2020)

Diplomatic posts
Preceded by Georg Andrén	Ambassador of Sweden to Guatemala; 2017–2020	Succeeded by Hans Magnusson
Preceded by Georg Andrén	Ambassador of Sweden to Belize; 2017–2020	Succeeded by Hans Magnusson
Preceded by Georg Andrén	Ambassador of Sweden to Costa Rica; 2017–2020	Succeeded by Hans Magnusson
Preceded by Georg Andrén	Ambassador of Sweden to El Salvador; 2017–2020	Succeeded by Hans Magnusson
Preceded by Georg Andrén	Ambassador of Sweden to Honduras; 2017–2020	Succeeded by Hans Magnusson
Preceded by Georg Andrén	Ambassador of Sweden to Nicaragua; 2017–2020	Succeeded by Hans Magnusson
Preceded by Georg Andrén	Ambassador of Sweden to Panama; 2017–2020	Succeeded by Hans Magnusson
