= Lennart Nylander =

Swedish diplomat (1901–1966)

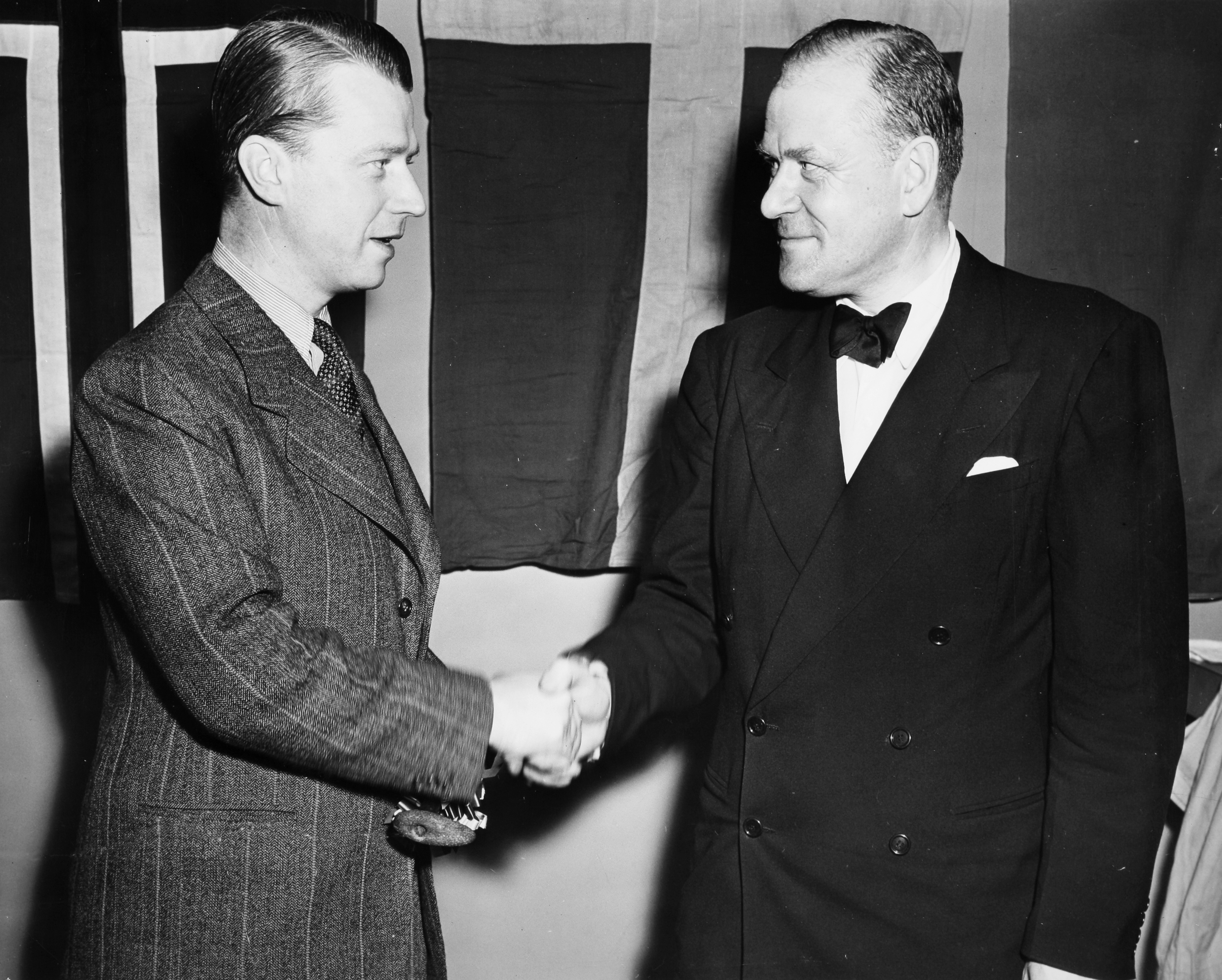
- Nylander (right) with the CEO of SAS, Per Norlin, in New York City in 1946.
- Born: Karl Lennart Hjalmar Nylander; 4 September 1901; Edefors, Sweden
- Died: 15 July 1966 (aged 64); Greenwich, Connecticut, USA
- Education: Uppsala University
- Occupation: Diplomat
- Years active: 1928–1962
- Spouse(s): Margareta Fjellander (m. 1929–1952) Inga Olsson (m. 1952)
- Children: 4

Karl Lennart Hjalmar Nylander (4 September 1901 – 15 July 1966) was a Swedish diplomat.

== Early life ==
Nylander was born on 4 September 1901 in Edefors, Sweden, the son of Emil Nyland, a physician, and his wife Hedvig von Post. He passed studentexamen in Växjö in 1920 and received a Candidate of Law degree from Uppsala University in 1925 and a bachelor's degree in 1928. Nylander was Grand Marshal (Övermarskalk) at the university's 450th anniversary in 1927.

== Career ==
Nylander became an attaché at the Ministry for Foreign Affairs in Stockholm in 1928 and served at the Swedish Consulate General in New York City the same year. Nylander then served as an attaché in Bern in 1930 and as second secretary at the Foreign Ministry in Stockholm in 1933.

Nyland was a first legation secretary in Riga, Tallinn and Kovno from 1936 to 1938. Nylander became first secretary at the Foreign Ministry in Stockholm in 1938 and legation secretary in Moscow in 1940 and Director at the Foreign Ministry in Stockholm in 1942. In 1942, Nylander was posted in Berlin as trade counsellor, and in 1944 he was appointed legation secretary there. In 1945, Nylander was appointed consul general in New York City. He served 10 years as consul general before being appointed envoy at the Swedish Embassy in Mexico City in 1955. Nylander served as ambassador there from 1956 to 1962, also as non-resident ambassador to Guatemala, Costa Rica, Honduras, Nicaragua and El Salvador.

Nylander was a board member of the Chesapeake Corp of Virginia, of the Swedish Seamen's Welfare Fund, Inc. (chairman from 1947), and the Seamen of Sweden, Inc. (chairman from 1949) in New York City. He was also an honorary member of the American Swedish Historical Foundation. Nylander was an honorary doctor of the Bard College in New York and Upsala College in New Jersey.

== Personal life ==
Nylander was first married from 1929 to 1952 with Margareta Fjellander (1904–1979), the daughter of Gunnar Fjellander and Elisabeth Svedberg. In 1952 he married Inga Olsson, the daughter of Elis Olsson. He was the father of Carl (born 1932), Anne Marie (born 1933), Mary Anne (born 1933), and Elisabeth (1933–2011). Nylander lived in retirement in Greenwich, Connecticut, United States.

== Death ==
Nylander died of a stroke on 15 July 1966 at Greenwich Hospital in Greenwich, Connecticut, United States.

== Awards and decorations ==
=== Swedish ===
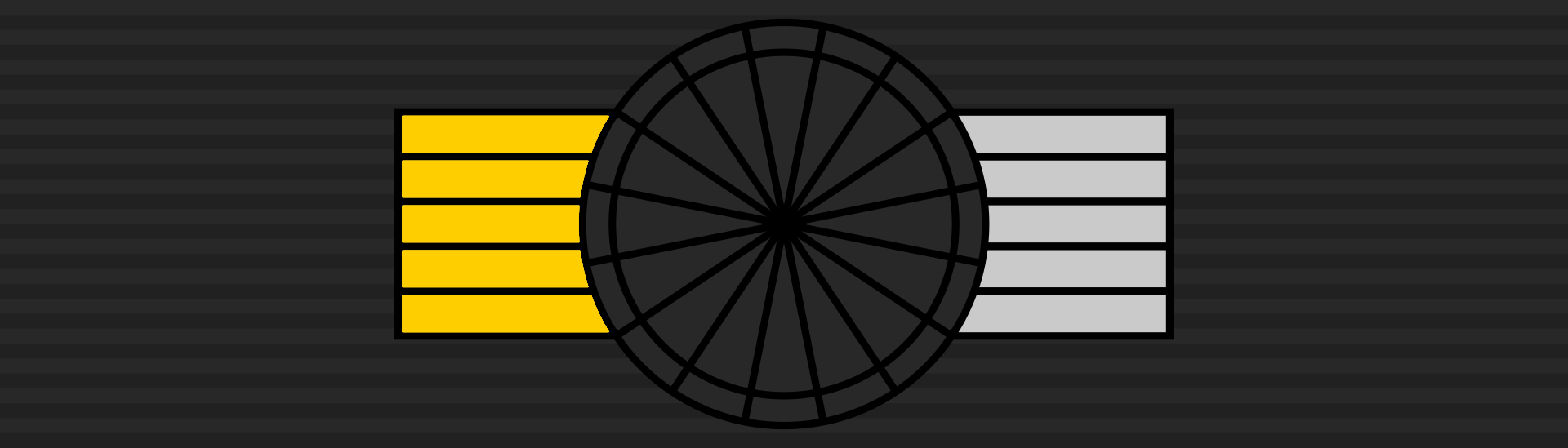
- (Sweden) Commander 1st Class of the Order of the Polar Star (23 November 1955)
- (Sweden) Commander of the Order of the Polar Star (4 June 1949)

=== Foreign ===
- (Norway) Commander with Star of the Order of St. Olav (1950)
- (Latvia) Commander of the Order of the Three Stars
- (Lithuania) Commander of the Order of the Lithuanian Grand Duke Gediminas
- (Netherlands) Commander of the Order of Orange-Nassau
- (Nazi Germany) 1st Class of the Order of the German Eagle
- (Belgium) Officer of the Order of Leopold II
- Knight 1st Class of the Order of the White Rose of Finland
- (Estonia) 4th Class of the Order of the Cross of the Eagle

Diplomatic posts
Preceded by Martin Kastengren	Consul General of Sweden to New York City; 1945–1955	Succeeded by Erik Kronvall
Preceded by Sven Grafström	Envoy/Ambassador of Sweden to Mexico; 1955–1962	Succeeded by Tord Göransson
Preceded by Sven Grafström	Ambassador of Sweden to Guatemala; 1955–1962	Succeeded by Tord Göransson
Preceded by Sven Grafström	Ambassador of Sweden to Costa Rica; 1955–1962	Succeeded by Tord Göransson
Preceded by Sven Grafström	Ambassador of Sweden to El Salvador; 1955–1962	Succeeded by Tord Göransson
Preceded by Sven Grafström	Ambassador of Sweden to Honduras; 1955–1962	Succeeded by Tord Göransson
Preceded by Sven Grafström	Ambassador of Sweden to Nicaragua; 1955–1962	Succeeded by Tord Göransson
