= Order of Carlos Manuel de Céspedes =

Cuban national honor instituted in 1926

Orden Carlos Manuel de Céspedes

Awarded by Cuba
- Type: Order of merit
- Awarded for: "To distinguish oneself in the struggle for the liberation of peoples, in friendship toward the Cuban Revolution, or through valuable contributions to world peace."
- Status: Currently constituted

Precedence
- Next (lower): Order of Carlos J. Finlay
- The first ribbon bar is of the order's single rank since 1978. Below, ribbon bar pins of Grand Cross, Grand Officer, Commander, Officer and Knight of the order between 1926 and 1978.

The Order of Carlos Manuel de Céspedes is a decoration of the Republic of Cuba. It is named in honor of Cuban military commander and independence leader Carlos Manuel de Céspedes (1819–1874).

== 1926–1978 ==
With the name of the Carlos Manuel de Céspedes National Order of Merit, it was created by Presidential Decree No. 486 of Gerardo Machado, on April 18, 1926. It was awarded as a reward for services rendered to the country by nationals or foreigners in the exercise of diplomatic positions or other eminent services provided to Cuba and humanity. It was established as an order of which the Master, and therefore the person authorized to grant it, was the President of the Republic; the Secretary of State was the Chancellor and the Undersecretary of State was the Vice Chancellor.

The ranks of the order were:

- Grand Cross (only for the President and heads of foreign States);
- Grand Cross of the second degree (for Secretary of State and foreign Ministers of Foreign Affairs);
- Grand Officer (for Undersecretaries of States and Extraordinary Envoys or Plenipotentiary Ministers);
- Commander (for Councilors, First Secretaries of embassy and legation with five years of service);
- Official (for first secretaries of embassy or legation and commercial attachés);
- Knight or Lady (for second secretaries of embassy or legation, third secretaries and diplomatic attachés).

There was also a necklace of the order, for ceremonial use by the president in office from 1955 onwards, which was made by the Vilardebó y Riera goldsmithing house – which made many other national decorations – and which was later lost. The medal of the order consisted of the effigy of Céspedes in a circular gold medallion surrounded by a blue enamel band with the name of the hero and the year of the Demajagua uprising, 1868. Around it was a garland with four stars. which represent the four states into which the republic was divided in 1868: Oriente, Camagüey, Las Villas and Occidente and emerging from this ten rayed acanthus leaves that represent the tenth month of the year (October, month of the uprising). On the obverse the national coat of arms of Cuba appears on white enamel. The medal hangs from a navy blue moiré ribbon. Ten rays aligned with the acanthus are added to the Great Cross, five smooth and five diamond-shaped.

At this time the government only handed out the diploma of the order, the medal had to be paid for by the winner.

In 1959, after the communist Cuban Revolution, all awards to Cuban citizens and institutions made by ousted President Fulgencio Batista were annulled and all those decorated were examined to expel those considered unworthy. In 1960, the Venezuelan Ignacio Luis Arcaya, known as the "Chancellor of Dignity", was awarded.

== Since 1978 ==
Between 1978 and 1979, the entire Cuban honors system was rebuilt with Law No. 17 of June 28, 1978 on the System of Decorations and Honorary Titles; Decree-Law No. 30 of December 10, 1979; and Annex No. 4 to the First Agreement of the Council of State of December 12, 1979. The Carlos Manuel de Céspedes Order is intended to reward Cuban and foreign citizens, Heads of State or Government, leaders of other States, who stand out in the fight for the national liberation of the people, for the friendship demonstrated towards the Cuban Revolution or for the international prestige achieved in political, social or economic struggles in favor of the people or for valuable contributions to the consolidation of peace and peaceful coexistence.

The physical form of the order is regulated as follows: "on its obverse and in relief, it has a five-point convex star enamelled in white with a gold bezel 1 millimeter wide, fixed on a pentagon with convex sides constructed by bundles of rod; As a base it also has a red enamelled pentagonal star and a 1 millimeter wide gold bezel. The insignia is inscribed in an imaginary circle of 45 millimeters in diameter.—In the central and raised part, it has two concentric circles; the inner one is 18 millimeters in diameter, in whose circle the effigy of Carlos Manuel de Céspedes is represented in gold; The outer one, 26 millimeters in diameter, forms with the inner one a turquoise blue enamelled crown 4 millimeters wide; At the top of the crown and in the shape of a semicircle, the gold inscription CARLOS MANUEL DE CESPEDES appears between two stars of the same metal, 3 millimeters in diameter; At the bottom and in the shape of a semicircle, the gold inscription "1868".—On its reverse, in the center and in relief, it has the Coat of Arms of the Republic of Cuba; at the top and in the shape of a semicircle, the inscription REPUBLICA DE CUBA; At the bottom and also in the shape of a semicircle, the inscription STATE COUNCIL.—The insignia hangs by a ring from a pentagonal moiré ribbon, whose lower and upper sides measure 25 millimeters and the sides 30, with stripes of turquoise blue, red and white colors, subdivided from right to left in the following way: a turquoise blue stripe of 13 millimeters, a red stripe, a white stripe and a turquoise blue stripe of 4 millimeters wide each.—The ribbon in its The reverse has a safety pin.—The pin that represents it is of a convex rectangular shape and measures 25 millimeters long by 15 millimeters high, covered by a moiré ribbon with the same color stripes and measurements as those of the pentagon from which the insignia.—The pin on its reverse has a safety pin.

Those decorated in the second stage of the order are:

- 1981: Marshal Leonid Ilyich Brezhnev, President of the Presidium of the Supreme Soviet of the USSR and General Secretary of the Central Committee of the Communist Party of the Soviet Union.
- 1986: Ivan Vasilyevich Arkhipov, First Vice-president of the Council of Ministers of the USSR.
- 1988: Jorge Leal Amado de Faria, writer from Brazil.
- 1988: Dr. Arnaldo Orfila Reynal, editor from Argentina.
- 1994: Dr. Hage Gottfried Geingob, Prime Minister of the Republic of Namibia.
- 1995: Captain Kojo Tsikata, Member of the State Council of Ghana.
- 1998: Commander Jesús Sergio Basilio Montané Oropesa, Assistant to the First Secretary of the Central Committee of the Communist Party of Cuba.
- 2000: Juan Miguel González Quintana, father of Elián González, "in recognition of the attitude maintained during the battle for the claim of his son and in defense of the dignity of the Homeland during the events caused by the kidnapping of the child Elián".
- 2004: Supreme Commander Hugo Rafael Chávez Frías, President of the Bolivarian Republic of Venezuela.
- 2019: Luiz Inácio Lula da Silva.
