= Embassy of Sweden, Mexico City =

- Location: Mexico City
- Address: Avenida Paseo de las Palmas 1225; Col. Lomas de Chapultepec; 11 000 México, D.F. México
- Coordinates: 19.42414°N 99.22299°W
- Ambassador: Pernilla Josefsson-Lazo
- Jurisdiction: Mexico
- Website: Official website

The Embassy of Sweden in Mexico City is Sweden's diplomatic mission in Mexico. The mission of the embassy is to represent Swedish interests in Mexico, as well as to strengthen bilateral relations within the governmental, commercial, business, academic, cultural and civil society spheres, with a particular emphasis on cooperation for sustainable development.

== History ==
Sweden and Mexico have had diplomatic relations since 1850. An Honorary Consulate General in Mexico City was established by royal decree on 18 December 1885. Its jurisdiction was expanded by a royal decree on 16 November 1886, to include the United Mexican States, except for the city of Veracruz, which was only added by a decision on 30 November 1894. During the parliamentary session of 1913, a decision was made to establish a salaried Consulate General, whose holder also served as chargé d'affaires.

In May 1921, the Committee of Supply approved the establishment of a new permanent mission in Mexico. The consulate general was converted into a legation after the King in Council, on 30 September 1921, appointed the Swedish consul general and chargé d'affaires in Mexico as minister to both Mexico and Havana.

In the 1940s, Costa Rica, Guatemala, Honduras, Nicaragua, Panama and El Salvador belonged to the legation's area of operation. The legation consisted during this time of an envoy and a first clerk. In 1956, the Swedish legation was elevated to embassy and envoy Lennart Nylander now became ambassador instead.

In November 1995, the Swedish embassy was occupied by 23 Mexican sanitation workers. The sanitation workers had been dismissed from their jobs. They entered the Swedish embassy premises on 23 November and requested asylum. Their main demand was to regain their jobs. When the occupiers saw a police force approaching around four in the morning on 27 November, they voluntarily left the area, taking their blankets with them.

== Staff and tasks ==
=== Staff ===
As of June 2024, 13 people work at the Embassy, of which four are diplomats sent by the Ministry for Foreign Affairs.

=== Tasks ===
The embassy have three main priorities: Promotion of Sweden, monitoring the political and economic situation in Mexico and consular affairs. The promotion of Sweden includes activities that improves the knowledge and strengthen the image of Sweden as a progressive country characterized by innovative thinking, consideration and respect towards others, openness and authenticity. To achieve this, the embassy cooperates with over 100 Swedish companies located in Mexico to stimulate trade relations between the two countries. In addition, the embassy works to promote Swedish culture in Mexico. The embassy informs the Swedish government about the political and economic situation in the Mexico, a task that requires a large network of contacts in the Mexican society. The third priority concerns consular services and migration issues. This area includes administrative work on migration cases, passports, visas, residence permits and other assistance to Swedish or Mexican citizens.

== Buildings ==
=== Chancery ===
From 1920 to 1924, the chancery was located on Apartado 86 bis in the Historic center of Mexico City. From 1925 to 1928, the chancery was located at Calle Liverpool 5 in Colonia Juárez in the borough of Cuauhtémoc. In 1929, the chancery was located at 34 Calle de Sadi Carnot in Colonia San Rafael in Cuauhtémoc. From 1930 to 1933, the chancery was located at Calle Londres 136 A in Colonia Juárez. From 1934 to 1938, the chancery was located at Calle Dinamarca 55 in Colonia Juárez. In 1939 it moved around the corner to Calle Liverpool 57 where it remained to 1956. From 1957 to 1970, the chancery was located at Buenavista 3, México 3. From 1971 until at least 1975, the chancery was located at Avenida Homero 136, 10° piso in the Chapultepec Morales neighborhood of Polanco.

From 1994, the chancery was located at Paseo de las Palmas 1375 in the Lomas de Chapultepec area. The building consisted of four floors and had a white-plastered facade. It was built in 1946 and the first owners were Aida and David Egea de Naval. They bought the plot from Nueva Chapultepec Heights Company. In 1989, the couple sold the house and in 1994 it was again for sale. This time, Britt Ericsson de Oliva, second secretary of the Swedish Embassy, bought the building on behalf of the Swedish state. The house then underwent extensive renovation and refurbishment. It had until 1994 served as a family residence. Architect for the remodeling was Thord Hallström, BSK Arkitekter.

The architects Hidemark & Stintzing were commissioned in the fall of 2017 to develop a simplified system document based on the Ministry for Foreign Affairs' program requirements for a new chancery, where the environmental profile was an important criterion. The American environmental certification system LEED was chosen, with the goal of achieving the highest classification: Platinum. The building ended up using 44 percent less energy and around 60 percent less water than similar buildings without LEED certification. The building also has solar panels on the roof and its own water treatment plant. The building is located in the garden of the ambassador's residence at the address Paseo de las Palmas 1225 and replaces the previous chancery a few blocks away, which was located at Paseo de las Palmas 1375. In 2018, Sweco was commissioned by the National Property Board of Sweden to construct the new chancery. The new chancery building of 800 m^{2} was built on the same property as the embassy residence. The building is earthquake-proof and was planned to be the first Swedish embassy in the world to be certified according to LEED Platinum.

=== Residence ===
The ambassadorial residence is located at Paseo de las Palmas 1215 in the Lomas de Chapultepec area. The house was built in 1934 on behalf of a doctor. In 1954, the Swedish state acquired the property through Stig Engelfeldt, who was chargé d'affaires in Mexico City at that time. The house consists of four floors and is built of plastered brick. In the parlour and dining room there are large windows that open onto the garden. On the plot there is also a swimming pool.

== Gallery ==
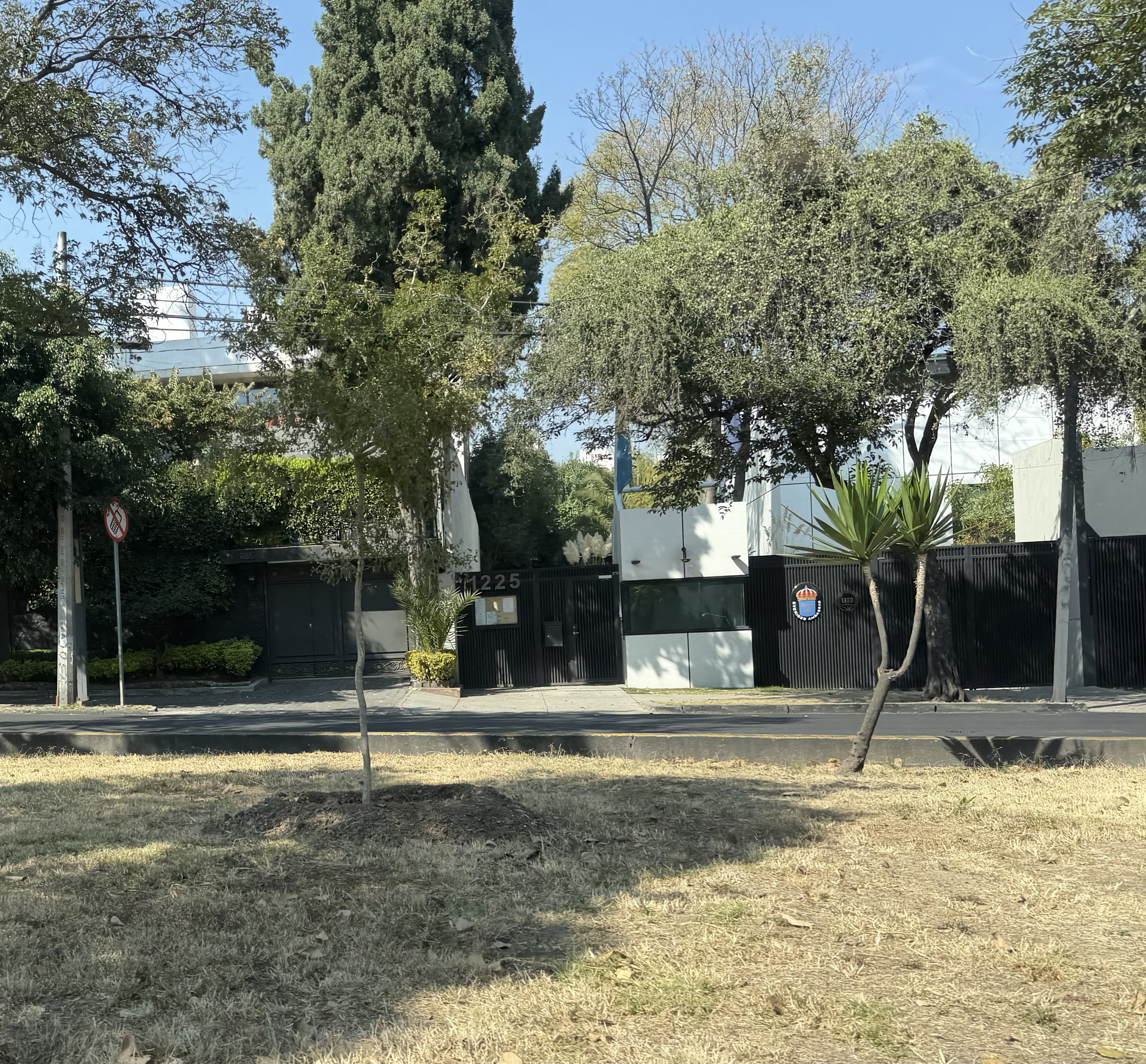
Embassy of Sweden in Mexico City

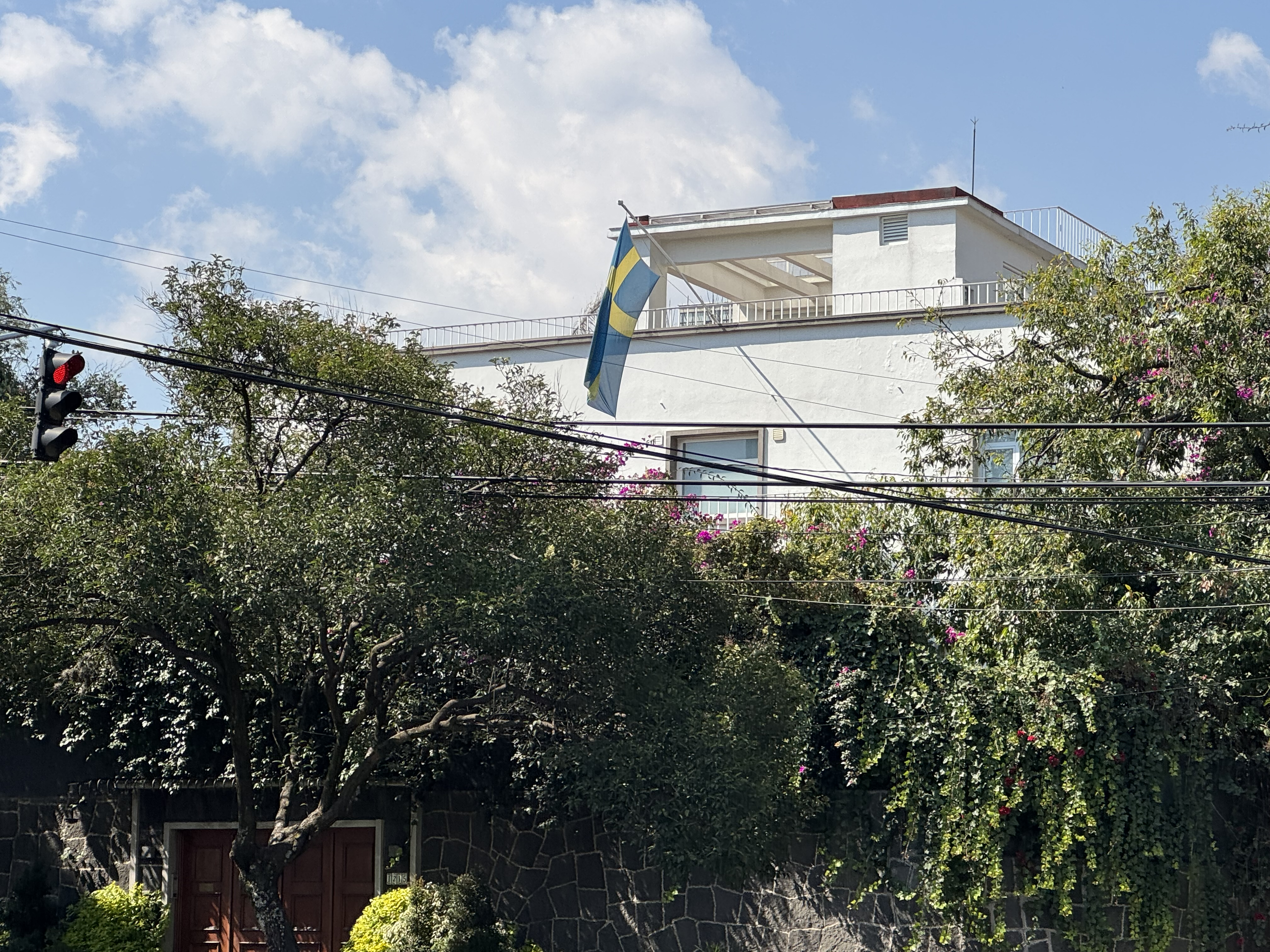
The residence of the Embassy of Sweden at Paseo de las Palmas 1215 in Mexico City

== See also ==
- Mexico–Sweden relations
