= Soldiers' Home Association =

- Sotilaskotiliitto
- Formation: 1921; 105 years ago
- Type: Voluntary association
- Location: Helsinki, Finland
- Website: www.sotilaskotiliitto.fi/en

The Soldiers' Home Association (Finnish: Sotilaskotiliitto, Swedish: Soldathemsförbundet) is the oldest national defense organization of Finland — having operated continuously since 1921 — and is based on volunteering. It is also a member of the National Defence Training Association of Finland. The association maintains the titular soldiers' homes (Finnish: sotilaskoti, Swedish: soldathem), which are recreational centers within garrison areas. The customers of the soldiers' homes are mainly the professional and conscripted soldiers working in the garrison, visiting relatives, and reservists participating in refresher training.

The operation of the soldiers' homes is maintained by 4,800 volunteers and 170 paid employees. 36 local associations operate under the Soldiers' Home Association. Joining the activity is voluntary, the only conditions are that the applicant must be at least 16 years old and have Finnish citizenship.

== History ==
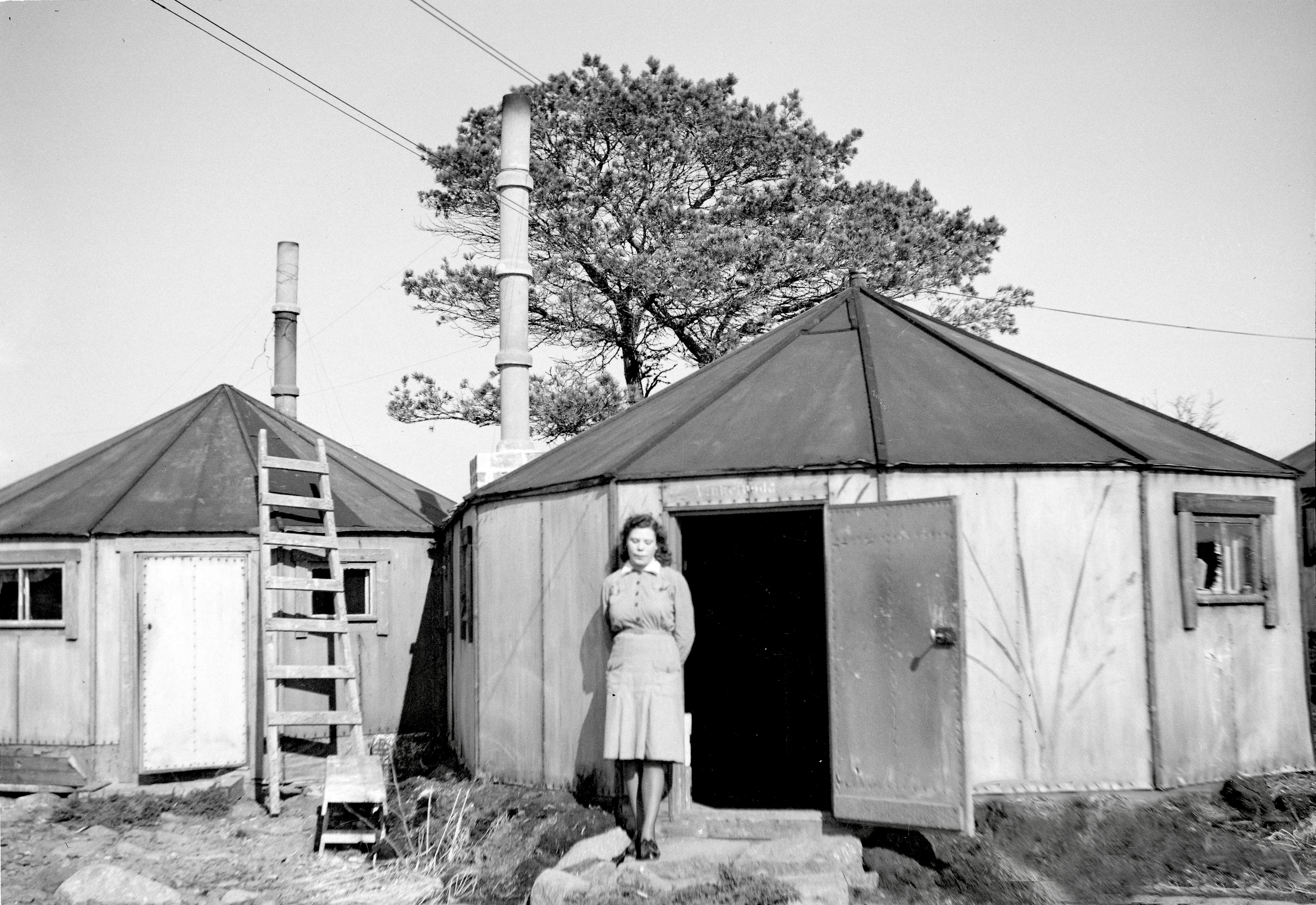
A hut serving as soldiers' home in Åland, in April 1944

Finland's first soldiers' home was opened by Helsinki NMKY on 15 April 1918 during the Finnish Civil War. Helsinki NMKY's Soldiers' Home work in Santahamina ended in 2004. The Salvation Army also belongs to the history of military domestic work. Its first soldiers' home began its operations in 1919 in Terijoki's Border Guard Battalion in Tyrisevä. Women who were with the troops in the Civil War also started military domestic work in the fall of 1918. The Soldiers' Home Association itself was founded in 1921 (initially the name was Suomen Sotilaskotiliitto) and its first president was Katri Bergholm.

== Activity ==
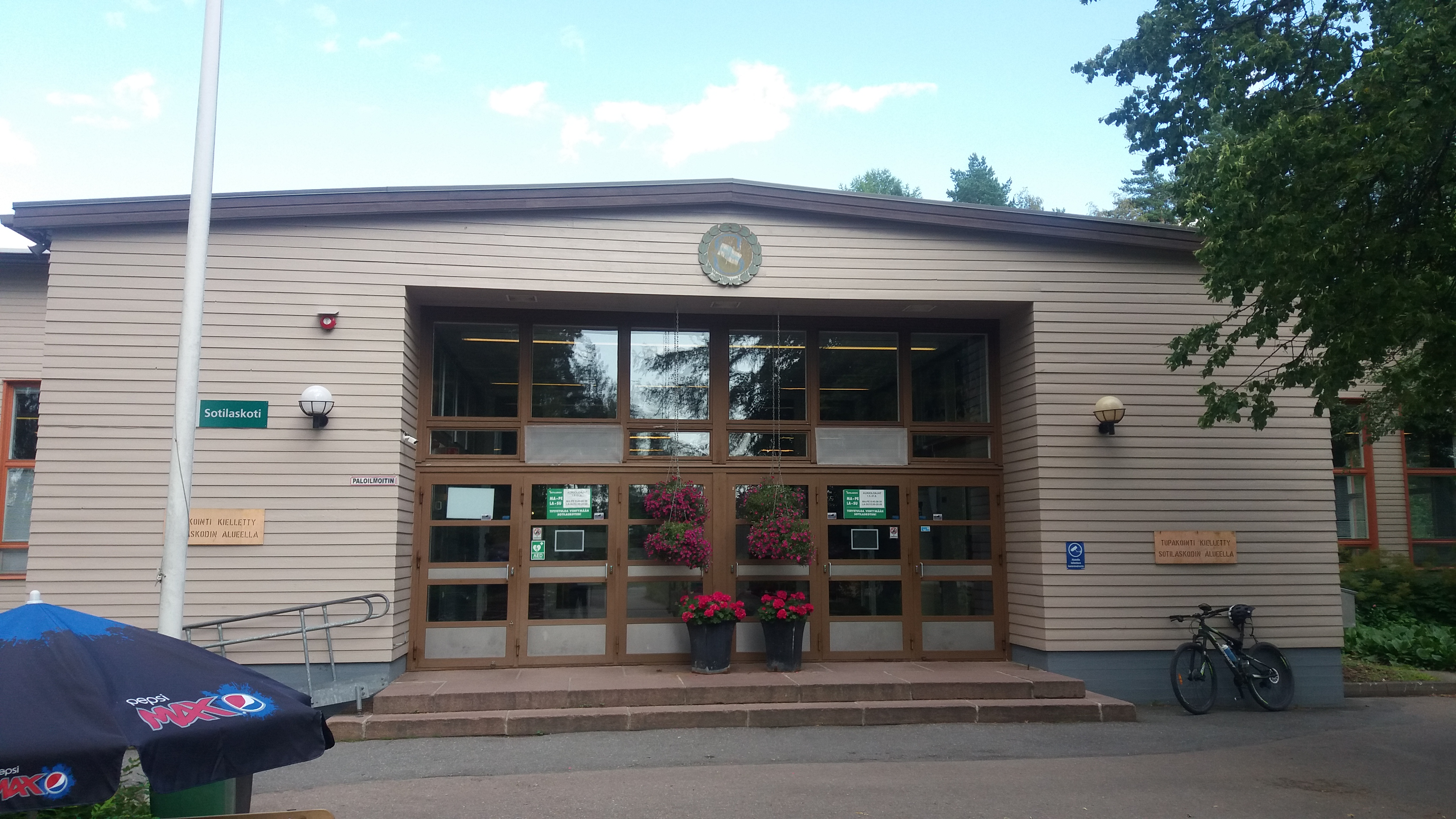
Soldiers' home in the Niinisalo garrison

Soldiers' homes are run by local associations, and staffed for the most part by volunteers. Thanks to the volunteer "green sisters", the prices remain affordable. The military homes are famous for their donuts and other pastries. In addition to a cafeteria and kiosk, soldiers' homes typically have televisions, computers with internet access and a library. The purpose of the homes is to offer conscripts an environment where they can spend their free time; there is no compulsion to purchase anything. According to general service regulations, soldiers do not need to greet or address their superiors inside the soldiers' homes. The Defence Forces and the Border Guard support the operation by offering the properties for the Association's use without charging rent.

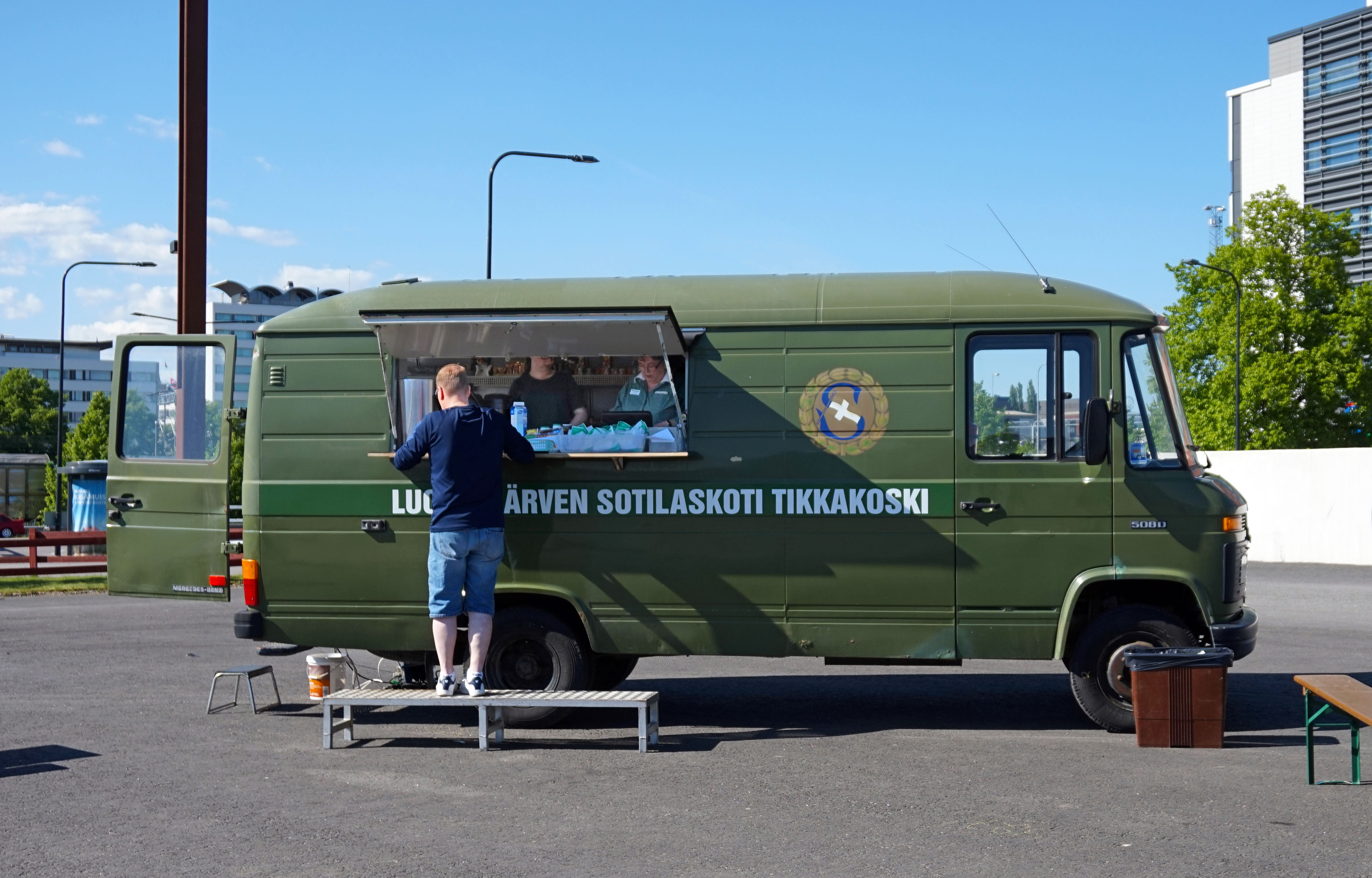
Mobile canteen in Jyväskylä

In military exercises and field camps, the Association operates from mobile canteens. These cars are also often present at public events where the Finnish Defence Forces are represented. In addition to locations in most Finnish garrisons, soldiers' homes may be found in large training areas, such as those of Pahkajärvi, Niinisalo and Rovajärvi.

== Hymn and march ==
The Soldiers' Home Association has an official title hymn and march. The title hymn is "Kosketa minua henki" ("Touch Me Spirit"), composed by Ilkka Kuusisto. The title march is "Sotilaspoika" ("Soldier Boy"), composed by Fredrik Pacius, which is listened to standing at parties and sitting at concerts.

== See also ==
- National Defence Training Association of Finland
- Voluntary association
