= White Guard (Finland) =

Militia of Finland

Civil Guard
- Suojeluskunnat (Finnish); Skyddskår (Swedish)
- Badge
- Leader: C. G. E. Mannerheim
- Dates active: 1917–1944
- Allegiance: White Finland (1917–1918); Kingdom of Finland (1918–1919); Republic of Finland (1919–1944)
- Active regions: Finland; East Karelia
- Part of: Finnish Defense Forces (after 1918)

The White Guard, officially known as the Civil Guard (Finnish: Suojeluskunta, IPA: [ˈsuo̯jelusˌkuntɑ]; Swedish: Skyddskår, Finland Swedish pronunciation: [ˈɕydːsˌkoːr]; lit. 'Protection Corps'), (Note: Other terms used include lit. 'Protection Guard' or 'Protection Militia' or 'White Militia'. In Russian literature the phonetic renderings Russian: шюдскор, шюцкор, romanized: shudskor, shutskor) are used, with the members called "shutskorites".) was a voluntary militia, part of the Finnish Whites movement, that emerged victorious over the socialist Red Guards in the Finnish Civil War of 1918. They were generally known as the "White Guard" in the West due to their opposition to the "communist" Red Guards. In the White Army of Finland, many participants were recruits, draftees and German-trained Jägers – rather than part of the paramilitary. The central organization was named the White Guard Organization, and the organization consisted of local chapters in municipalities.

The Russian Revolution of 1905 led to social and political unrest and a breakdown of security in Finland, which was then a Grand Duchy under the rule of the Russian Tsar. Citizen militias formed as a response, but soon these would be transformed along political (left-right) lines. The Russian Revolution of 1917 and the subsequent independence of Finland (declared in December 1917) also caused conflicts in the country. On January 27, 1918, the Finnish government ordered the disarming of all remaining Russian garrisons by the forces of the White Guard, and on the same day the Reds proclaimed revolution, leading to a bloody civil war. White Guards, led by General Gustaf Mannerheim, constituted the bulk of the victorious White Army during the Finnish Civil War (1918).

After the war, the Finnish Defence Forces and a regular police service were founded. From 1919–1934 White Guards were considered a voluntary part of the army, and separate Guard formations served in the reserve, but in 1934 all defence was consolidated into the regular army and the Guard became a voluntary defence-training organization only. Politically it was neutral, although unofficially it was anti-leftist, clearly anticommunist, conservative, largely rejected by the labour movement and by the political left. Units of it formed the main forces of the Lapua Movement's abortive coup d'état (the Mäntsälä Rebellion) in 1932, however only a small fraction of the Guard participated and the majority of it stayed loyal to the government. White Guardsmen served in the regular army during the Second World War. The White Guard was disbanded according to the terms of the 1944 Moscow Armistice, following the end of the Continuation War.

Similar militias operated in Estonia, Latvia and Lithuania, lands that, like Finland, came under Russian sovereignty until the collapse of Tsarist Russia in 1917. These militias remained in existence until World War II, evolving somewhat into home-guard militias. The phenomenon should be distinguished from the Freikorps established in Germany after its defeat in World War I, although some similarities exist.

== Historical context ==
During the first years of the 20th century, Russia had been working on the abolition of Finland's autonomous status. As a result, there was strong discontent in Finnish society. In 1905 Russia lost the Russo-Japanese War. This stunning and unexpected defeat led to the Russian Revolution of 1905. In Finland the unrest was expressed in the Finnish general strike of 1905. During the strike Finnish police forces were effectively disbanded, as they had been closely associated with the occupying Russian authorities. Municipal, mostly unarmed, security guards were spontaneously organised by individuals associated with the constitutional and Social Democratic parties. At first all political groups were able to work together, but towards 1906 the civil guards of large towns had become divided along party lines. The first violent clash between Red and White Guards occurred in July 1906 in Helsinki, but after the return of Finnish autonomy the moderate Social Democrats and the whole constitutional party withdrew from military activities. However, the radicalized Red Guard of Helsinki did not disband, despite an order from the Social Democratic leadership to do so, and took part in the mutiny at Sveaborg Fortress alongside revolutionary, anti-imperial Russian soldiers. In the ensuing fighting Tsarist Russian troops destroyed the Red Guard as an organisation.

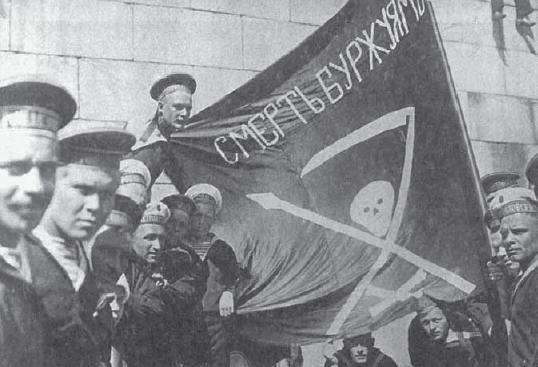
The collapse of discipline in the Tsarist Russian armed forces in 1917 created a power vacuum. Here, anarchist Russian sailors are photographed in Helsinki during the summer of 1917.

The February Revolution in Russia in 1917 caused the collapse of Russian political and military power in Finland. Again, the Russian-associated Finnish police were effectively disbanded, while the largely undisciplined Russian troops engaged in violence, mostly towards their own officers. During the summer of 1917 paramilitary groups were formed for protection and to preserve order. Although the founding of these "fire brigades" was often done in a non-partisan manner, they often split into two opposing factions during the autumn of 1917. The initially unarmed Red and White Guards strove to obtain weapons. The Red Guards usually were able to get arms from revolutionary Russian military units, while the White Guards got theirs from Swedish and German supporters abroad. At the same time, political tensions between socialists and non-socialists escalated. Inside the Social Democratic party, the official leadership was derailed while the executive committee of the Red Guards and the labour unions gained more power.

== The White Guards in the Civil War ==
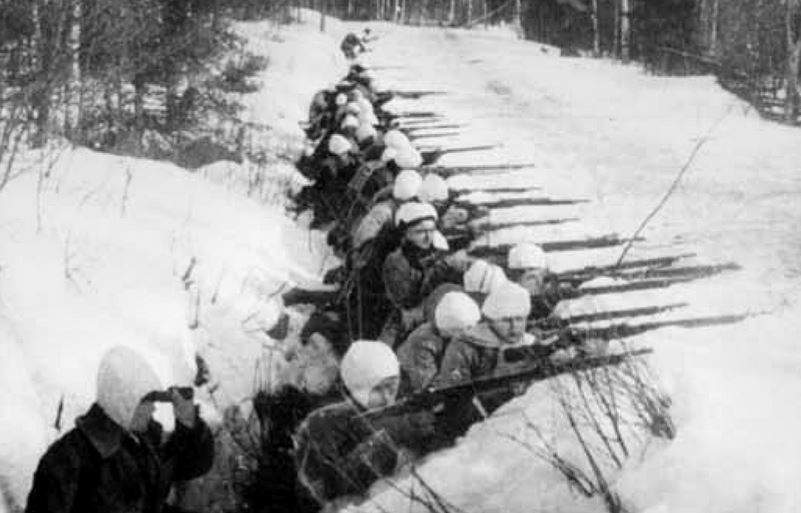
Whites in trench at battle of Ruovesi, March 1918.

The Senate, led by Pehr Evind Svinhufvud, proposed a Declaration of Independence, which the Parliament adopted on December 6, 1917. Declaring independence was one thing, but exercising control over the territory was another. Svinhufvud's "White Senate" had nothing but the White Guards to rely on as yet. There were 42,500 Russian soldiers in Finland. Although the Imperial Russian Army was slowly disintegrating and had already started to withdraw its units from Finland, the demoralized, poorly trained and undisciplined Russian military forces in the country posed a substantial challenge to Finnish authority.

In parliament the question on forming a new security force was hotly debated. On January 13, 1918, the non-socialist majority gave authorization to the Senate (Finnish cabinet) to organize a police force of the White Guard. Soon the Senate asked General Mannerheim to form a new Finnish army on the basis of the White Guard militia. In southern Karelia the White and Red Guards clashed in small-scale engagements as both sides attempted to secure the railway to St. Petersburg. During the night of January 27–28, 1918, the White Guards started to disarm and arrest the Russian garrisons in Ostrobothnia. During the night the executive committee of the Red Guards declared the Finnish Socialist Workers' Republic in Helsinki. The Civil War of Finland had begun.

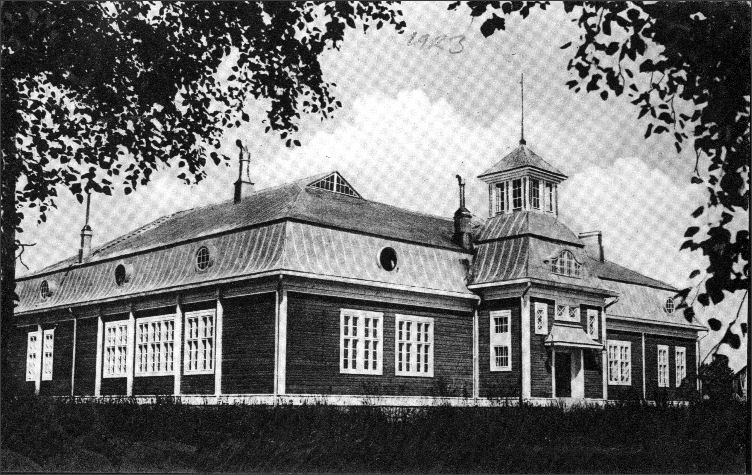
The Civil Guard House in Iisalmi

Neither the Red nor the White Guard were trained for combat. Structures had to be built in extreme haste by both parties. The White Army had a better foundation for this, as it received the Finnish Jaeger troops, some 1,900 men trained by Germany since 1915. These soldiers were able to act as instructors and officers, forming the officer and NCO corps of the new conscript army. In addition, the White side had 1,200 volunteers from Sweden (many of whom were officers), and a significant number of Finnish officers who had previously served in the imperial Russian Army but returned home after the revolution.

Although at the beginning of the war the White Guard formed the bulk of the White army, the conscript units very soon matched the White Guard units in number. These troops, which were much better disciplined and trained than the volunteer Guards, proved to be crucial for the outcome of the war. The Red side never accomplished conscription, which was one of the reasons for its demise.

After four months of bitter fighting, the Red Guards were defeated and the White Guards were recognized as one of the key agents in the victory, downplaying for political reasons the role of the German intervention units and the German-trained 2,000 Jaegers. The Civil War was portrayed as a liberation from Russian control after a 20-year-long Russification programme, with the Whites stressing the links of the Reds to the Russian Bolshevik regime. However the White victory was achieved with assistance from the Germans. German influence after the war was so strong that the independence of Finland was greatly in question until the end of World War I.

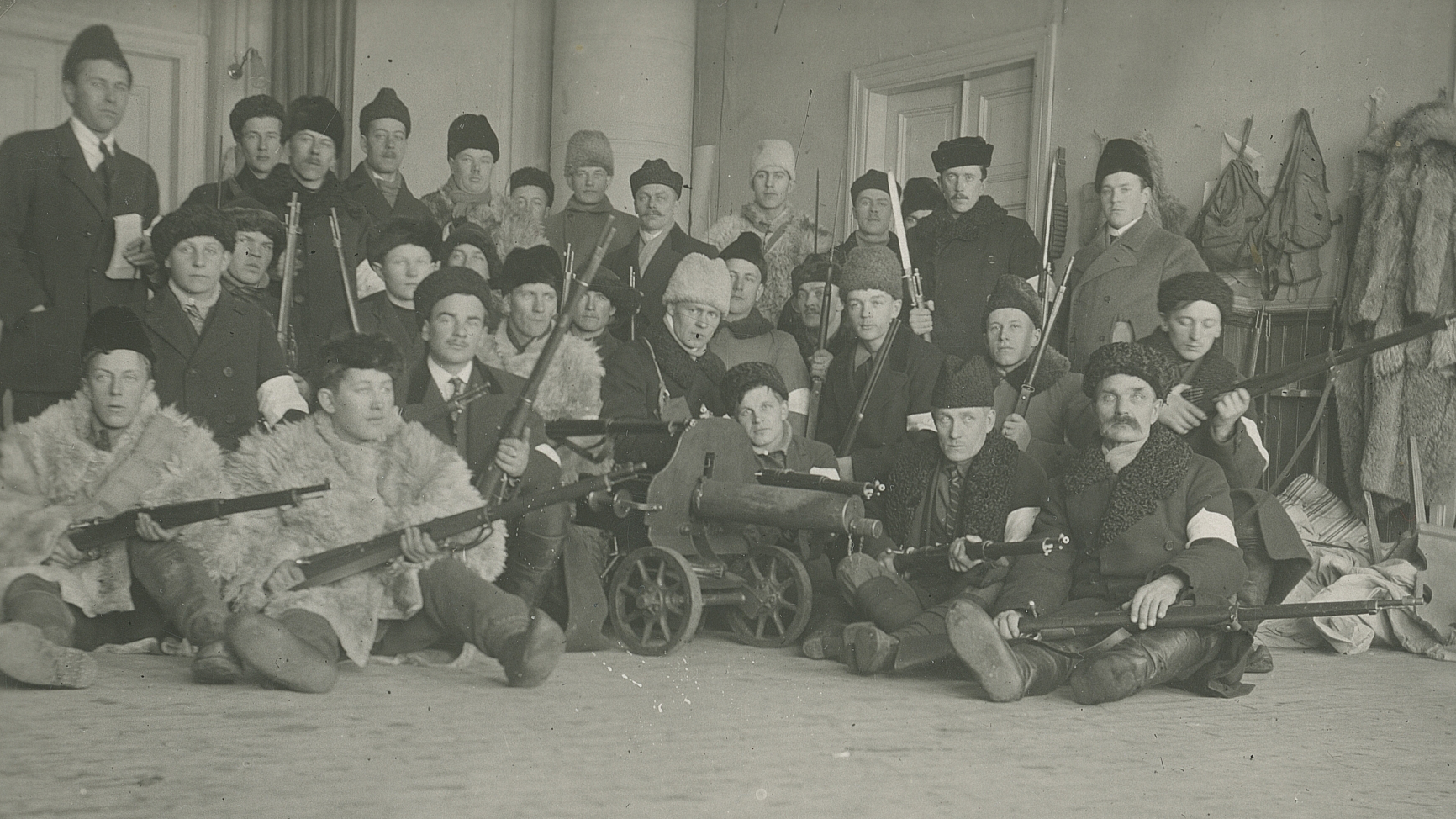
White Guard soldiers after the Battle of Tornio.

There were reparations in the aftermath of the Civil War. As the Reds had murdered some 1,100 people in their zone of control (the so-called Red terror), the Whites retaliated ruthlessly, executing or otherwise extrajudicially killing, according to a government-commissioned, non-partisan statistical study from 2004, about 7,370 people after the recapture of the Red areas (the so-called White terror). Older, socialist-leaning studies put the number at 10,000. Approximately 3,400 Whites and 5,200 Reds were killed in action. The famine of 1918 claimed another 20,000 lives. Of those who perished, some 12,000 died in the prison camps due to malnutrition-related epidemics. Because of their ruthlessness and eagerness to retaliate, the White Guards earned the title Lahtarikaarti (Butcher Guard) among the Reds.

== The White Guards after the Civil War ==
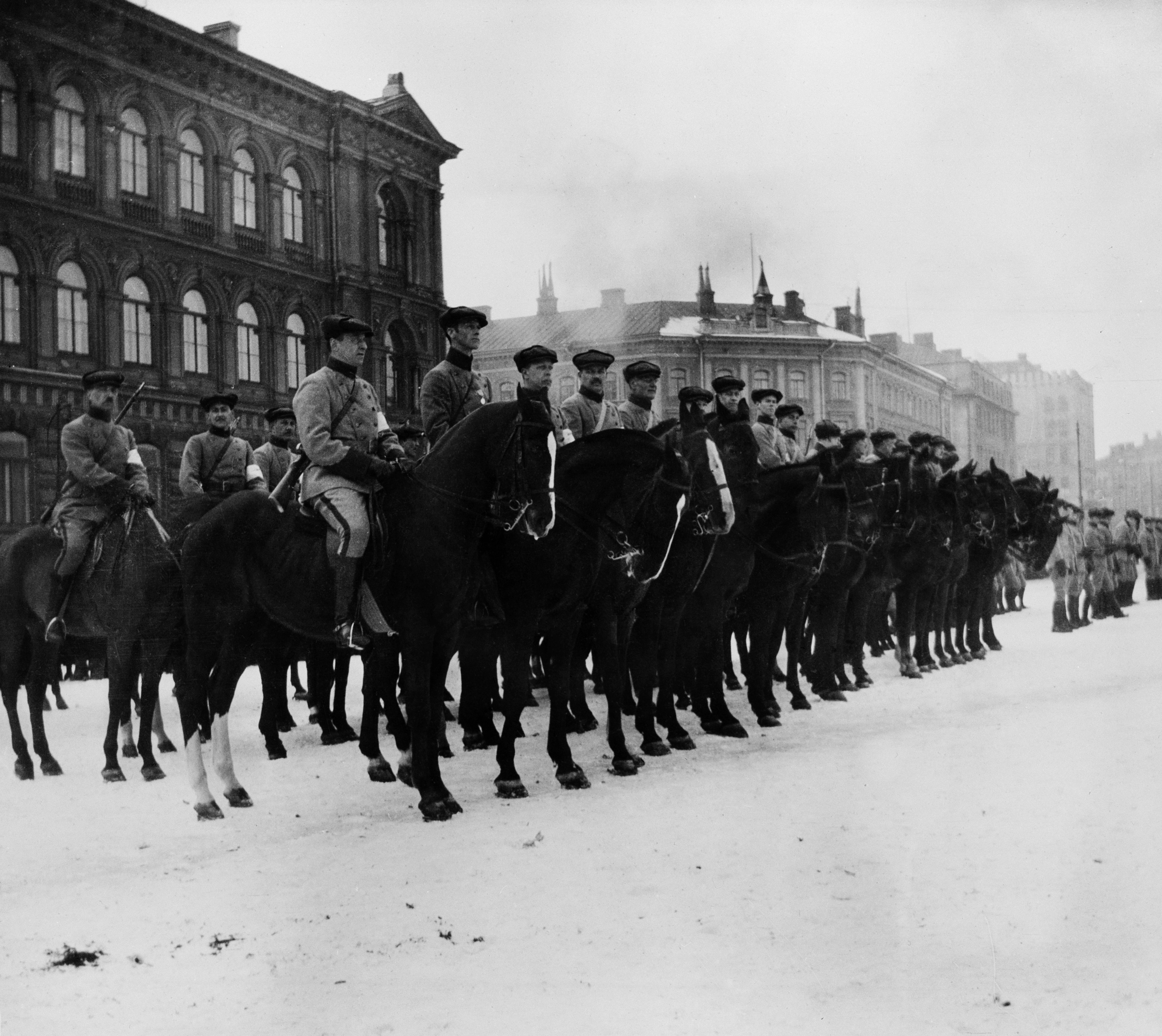
White Guard cavalry during a parade in Helsinki, March 1919.

After the Civil War the function of the White Guards was unclear. In some municipalities the local White Guard was understood to be a part of the municipal administration. In others, the organization was considered to have a primarily political role in safeguarding the result of the war. The organization was given a legal basis on August 2, 1918 by a decree of the Finnish Council of State. Changes to the decree were made later, refining the organization's structure. From the beginning, the White Guard was considered to be a voluntary part of the Finnish military.

The local White Guards' function in the following 20 years—up to the Winter War—was a mixture of Veteran Corps and Home Guards. After 1921, the White Guard organization consisted of the General Staff, White Guard districts and local White Guard chapters. Every municipality had at least a single chapter, which in part acted as an NGO (non-governmental organization) but in military affairs was part of the national chain of command. In an economic sense, each chapter was responsible for its own funding, although it received a minor grant from the state budget. The White Guard was active in numerous areas of Finnish life. It organized sports activities, especially cross-country skiing, shooting, orienteering, and pesäpallo (Finnish baseball). For fundraising, the chapters organised numerous informal events and lotteries. It is estimated that about one-fifth of all get-togethers in Finland were organized by the White Guard. To this end, the White Guard chapters had several hundred choirs, orchestras, and theatre groups.

The Chief of the White Guard and the district chiefs were selected by the President of Finland. From 1921 until the organization's demise, this post was occupied by General Lauri Malmberg who took command in the aftermath of the White Guard Affair. Usually, the district chiefs and most officers in the district headquarters were from the regular army.

Only able-bodied males between 17 and 40 years of age could be full members of the White Guard. Every member was required to attend a specified amount of training on pain of losing membership. The members were required to buy their own equipment and rifles, but the local chapters helped their members if the chapters had funds for it. Until 1934, the White Guard would have formed a division in the full-scale mobilisation.

In 1934 the Finnish mobilization system was changed. The new system was based on military districts acting as the local mobilization centers. In practice, the military districts coincided with the White Guard districts. In case of mobilization these two would be unified to act as a single home front district. After the change, the White Guard members formed the cadre of all wartime units, but no specific guard units were planned for mobilization. On the other hand, separate wartime White Guard units were removed from the mobilization plans. The function of the White Guard was no longer to provide ready fighting units but to act as a voluntary training organization for reservists. Only the Guard chapters immediately adjacent to the eastern border had responsibility for starting the initial defence against invasion. This effectively ended the role of the White Guard as a separate, political armed force.

In the Winter War (1939-40), the White Guard was responsible for carrying out mobilization. A quarter of the manpower of the field army consisted of Guard members. This contribution proved important, as Guard members were the best trained and equipped personnel in an army which lacked even basic supplies.

During the Winter War and the Continuation War (1941-44), Guard members mostly served at the front. In the home area, Guard districts formed local headquarters for military districts, and the oldest and youngest Guard members served in guard and anti-aircraft duties. There were some small anti-paratrooper actions on the home front, e.g. in Hollola in 1941. After the Continuation War, the White Guard was disbanded in November 1944, as demanded by the Soviet Union. However, the military district system as the basis for mobilization was retained, now fully as an army structure.

== Strength ==
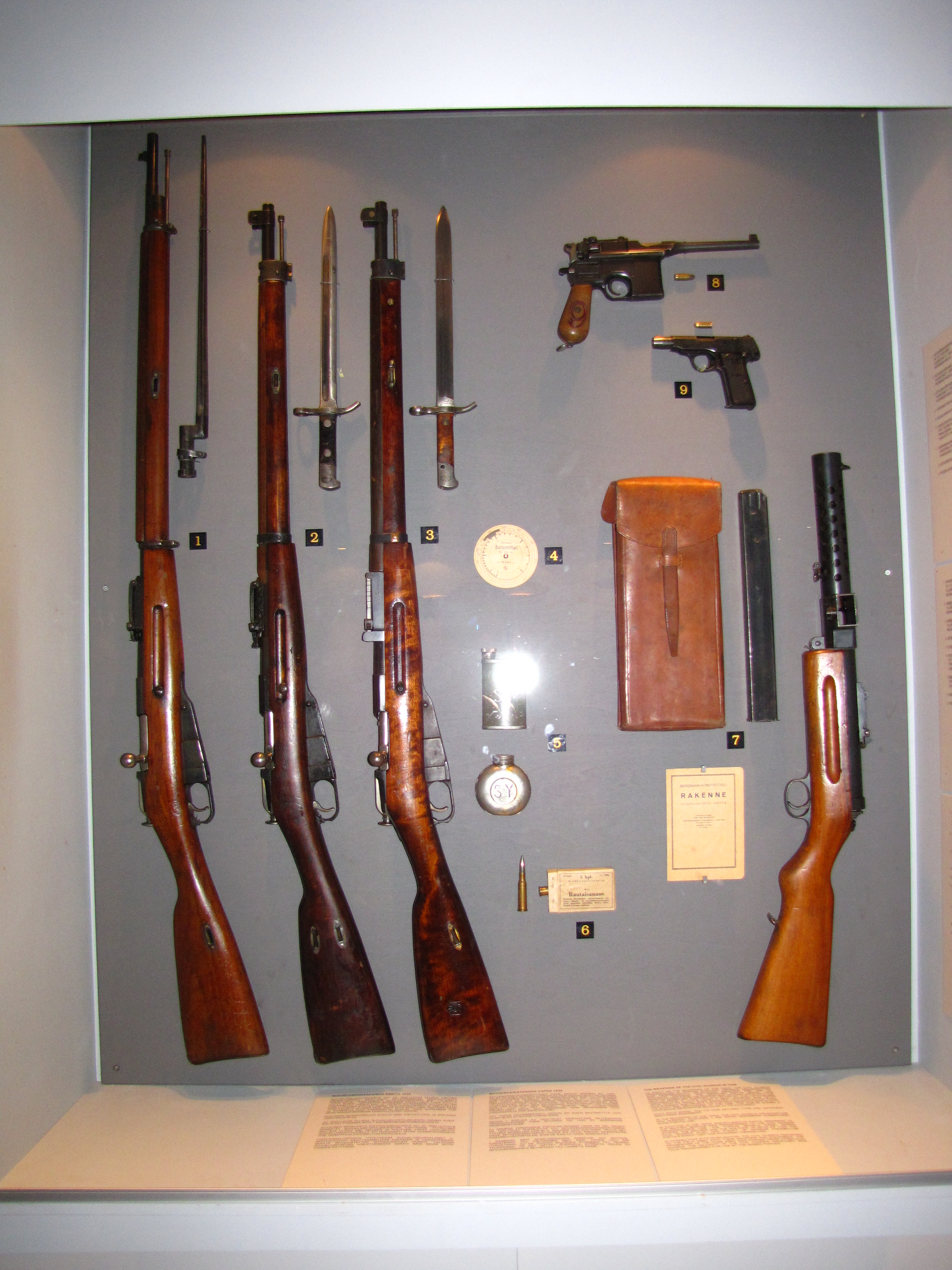
Weapons used by White Guards.

End of 1917	30,000 men
When the civil war started	35,000–40,000 men
At the end of the civil war	70,000 men
In 1920	100,000 men

== Relations with politicians ==
The frosty relations between White Guards and Socialists started to ease during the 1930s. During the 1920s Socialists had demanded the White Guards be demobilised, but as the Guard leadership and the overwhelming majority of the members remained loyal to the government during Mäntsälä rebellion, the demands were changed to making the Guards an official part of the army.

The political rift between the White Guard and the labour movement was ultimately healed during the Winter War, when leadership of the Guard and the Social Democratic Party issued a joint statement February 15, 1940, in which the Guard leadership recommended local Guards to recruit Socialists and the Party leadership recommended to its members that they join the Guards. At the same time, the employers' associations conceded to collective-bargaining agreements with the trade unions.

The White Guards' relations towards non-socialist parties were mostly warm. The Guard did not distinguish between any non-socialist political views and received the support of all non-socialist parties. Only during the Mäntsälä rebellion did these relations deteriorate, as some more radical parts of the Guard were linked with the extreme right-wing.

== Heritage ==
One of the chapters of the Treaty of Paris (1947) was disbandment of all "fascist-like organizations". The Soviet Union considered that the White Guard and Lotta Svärd were fascist organizations, and they were disbanded.

The disbanding of the White Guard effectively ended all Finnish voluntary military training for the next several decades. The sports activities of the Guard were taken over by ordinary civilian sports associations, while the psychological work of instilling a national defence spirit was continued by the reservists' associations. However, the Guard itself is a contentious issue, which still divides the people along political lines.

After the collapse of the Soviet Union, Finland unilaterally renounced the military articles of the Paris Peace Treaty of 1947. Following this, the NGOs working in fields with connections to total defence formed the National Defence Training Association of Finland (Finnish: Maanpuolustuskoulutus ry), which started to organise supplemental voluntary training primarily for Finnish Defence Forces reservists in conjunction with the Defence Forces. The legal basis for the activities was given by changing the Act on Defence Forces in 1994. More accurate basis was given by the Act on Voluntary Defence Work of 2007, which will make the Association a nominally independent public organization under political state control. As the heritage of the White Guard in Finland is very mixed, the National Defence Training Association does not consider itself to be the successor of the White Guard, and this has been noted, with satisfaction, on the left side of the political field.

In 2007 formation of Territorial Forces was started, a set of Finnish Defence Forces units composed of volunteer reservists, with the main duty of preparing for local defence. Some political groups have criticized formation of these units, saying that they are too close to White Guards that were abolished as fascist organization in 1944. However, unlike the White Guard, local defense troops are not a separate organization, but fully in the control of the Finnish Defence Forces.

== Dress and insignia ==
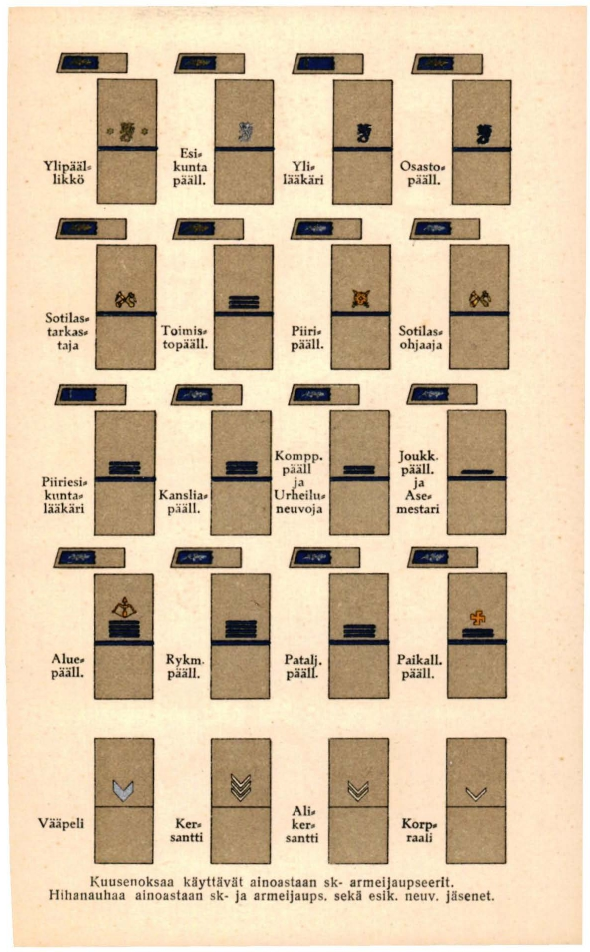
Rank and position insignia model 1921.

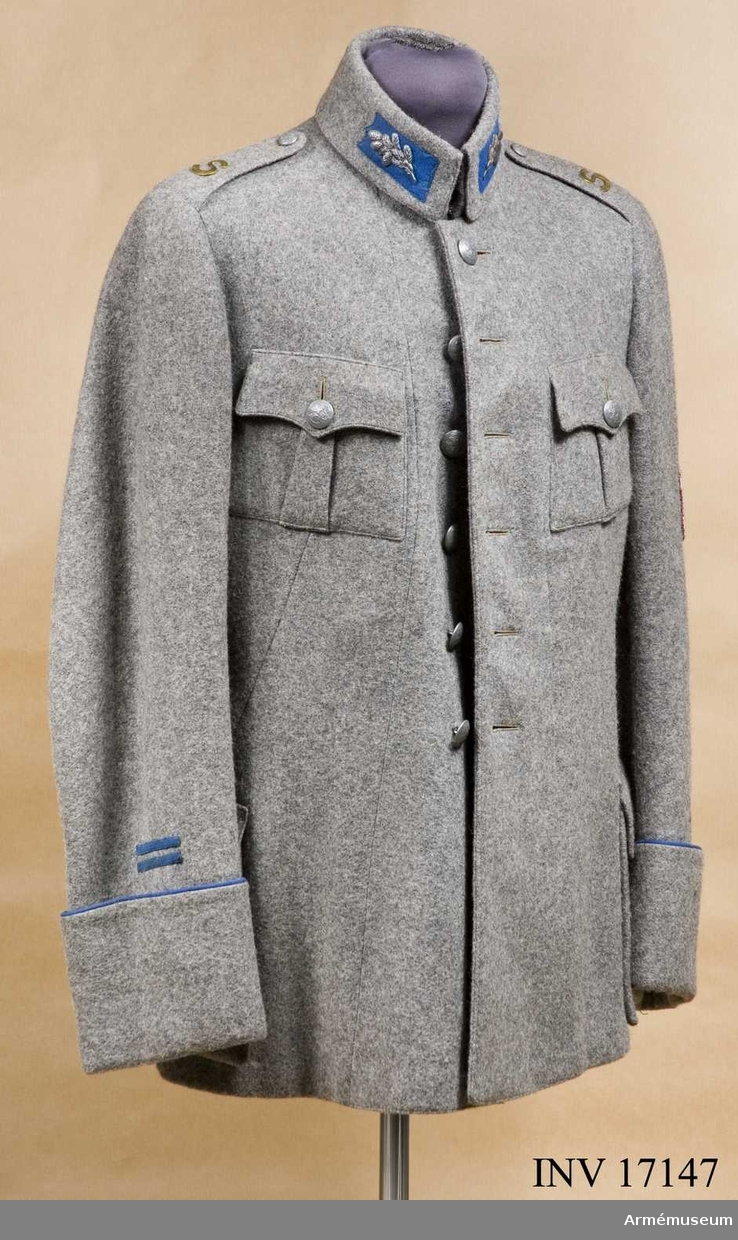
An officer's uniform (1924). The collar patch denotes an officer, the two stripes denotes a company commander.

The first ad hoc symbols were a white armband and a small, three-branched shoot from a spruce branch, placed into the hat. The basic insignia was an embroidered badge with a white "S" topped by three single shoots of spruce branches. The badge and the "S" were embroidered with a gold-colored border. The symbol worn by General C.G.E. Mannerheim had a blue field, but in the provinces, the field was divided (party per sinister), with two or three colors representing each province. The white armband also bore the name of the municipality. Each chapter had its own flag, but generally it was a symmetric variant of the modern State Flag of Finland where the cross was extended with small swastika arms, the "S" symbol in the canton and local symbols instead of the coat of arms.

The rank insignia was rather different from modern Finnish insignia. In principle, the officers did not have a rank system, as there were only one officer rank (suojeluskuntaupseeri), marked by a single metal spruce branch worn on the collar. However, task-specific insignia was used instead. Non-commissioned officers had military ranks denoted with the same type of chevrons as in the army. It must be kept in mind that Suojeluskunnat were a civilian organization and many members did not have formal military training. Those members who had served in the military held a separate rank in reserve.

Uniforms were Swedish and German-style and in "field gray" (Feldgrau) color.

== Central Command ==
During the Finnish Civil War, the Central Command of the White Guards served as the main military leadership of the White side in Finland. It was headed by Carl Gustaf Emil Mannerheim, who served as the Commander-in-Chief and oversaw all military operations. The command functioned as the central headquarters of the White Army, bringing together various regional and local White Guard units that had originally operated independently. From this headquarters, military strategy was planned and coordinated across different fronts, ensuring that operations were organized and effective. The Central Command also managed logistics, including the supply of weapons, food, and equipment, as well as organizing recruitment and mobilization of troops. Communication between different units and regions was another key responsibility, helping maintain coordination during rapidly changing wartime conditions. Over the course of the war, the Central Command played a crucial role in transforming the White Guards from a loose collection of local militias into a more structured and disciplined national army. This centralization of command and control was an important factor in the success of the White forces.

=== Commander-in-Chief ===
The Commander-in-Chief of the White Guards in Finland during the Finnish Civil War was Carl Gustaf Emil Mannerheim. He was appointed to this position in January 1918, shortly after the outbreak of the war, and given overall authority over all White military forces. At the time, the White Guards consisted largely of locally organized militias with limited coordination. Mannerheim’s role was to unify these forces under a single command and transform them into an effective national army. As Commander-in-Chief, Mannerheim directed military strategy and oversaw major operations against the Red forces. He established a central headquarters, coordinated troop movements across different regions, and worked to secure supplies, weapons, and trained personnel. His leadership also involved integrating trained officers, including those with experience from the Russian Imperial Army, into the White command structure. Under his command, the White forces achieved a series of key victories, including the capture of major cities such as Tampere. By May 1918, the White side had defeated the Red forces, effectively ending the war. Mannerheim’s leadership during this period was widely seen as a decisive factor in the outcome, and he later became one of the most important figures in early independent Finland.

== See also ==
- Jyväskylä Defence Corps Building
- Local Defence troops (Finland)
- Lotta Svärd – voluntary auxiliary organisation for women
- Seinäjoki Civil Guard House, now housing the Civil Guard & Lotta Svärd Museum
