= Local Defence companies (Finland) =

- Maakuntajoukot
- Sleeve insignia of the Local Defence forces under the Finnish Army
- Active: 14 February 2007–present
- Country: Finland
- Branch: Finnish Army, Finnish Navy, Finnish Air Force
- Type: Infantry
- Role: Land (local defence)
- Size: 5000

The Local Defence companies (Finnish: Maakuntajoukot, Swedish: Landskapstrupperna, 'Local Defence forces') are regional forces of Finnish Defence Forces (FDF) composed of volunteer reservists who have signed a contract that obliges them to do certain tasks during a crisis, with wartime strength supplemented by non-volunteer reservists as needed. The FDF works with and supervises the National Defence Training Association of Finland in the training of the troops. Local Defence companies are part of Local Defence battalions which are under command of the military province of their area (sotilaslääni, four in total, divided into 19 military districts, aluetoimisto), in total there are 28 companies. Sometimes the name is rendered as local defence units or volunteer reserve units.

The most important duties for Local Defence companies are protection, guarding, oversight and defence of certain targets and the area of their respective military district in general. In addition, Local Defence companies are tasked to provide assistance upon request to police and/or fire departments and other officials. During war, Local Defence battalions (of which Local Defence companies are part of-) will fall under the direct command of their respective headquarters of their respective Military province just as they are in peacetime. Members of the Local Defence companies have their personal equipment (excluding combat items such as vests, ballistic protection & helmets and weapons) at home on loan from the FDF, allowing quick mobilisation of troops in case of crisis since they only need to add combat equipment, vehicles, signalling equipment and supplies to be completely ready. These will be provided by garrisons and/or other military installations within or at least near to the military district the company in question is located in. Companies are always composed of reservists from area of certain military district within the military province in question, providing an advantage of knowing the area of operations. Troops are trained regularly and their physical abilities are tested annually with conditions of suitability for troops set higher than basic expectations for professional soldiers of FDF.

== Creation ==
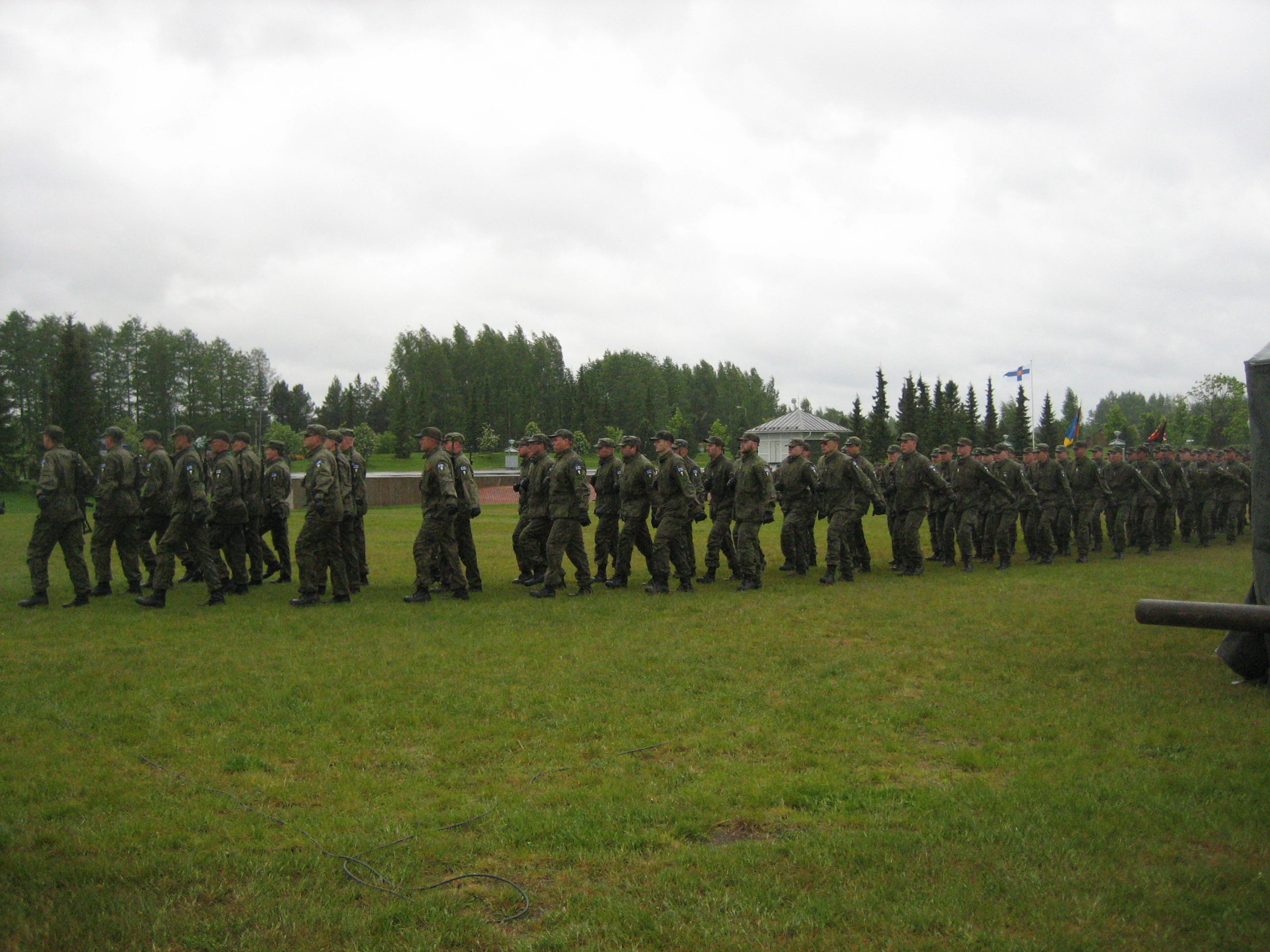
The Local Defence company (maakuntakomppania) of Satakunta, participating in the national parade of the Finnish Defence Forces in Pori on the Defence Forces Flag Day 2009.

In 1990, Finland declared the military restrictions of the Paris Peace Treaties, 1947 obsolete, which among other things had forbidden the military training outside of the FDF. In 1993, the National Defence Training Association of Finland was founded to guide and organize voluntary defence training; the legal basis was established in 1994. In 2001, it was decided to develop voluntary defence training. In 2002, a ministry-level working group was created to study the matter. The group released its report in 2004, calling for the creation of what would become Local Defence companies. On 14 February 2007, the Finnish parliament passed the Act on Defence Forces 551/2007 which allowed the creation of the Local Defence companies; President Tarja Halonen signed the law on 11 May.

== Critics ==
During the Local Defence forces' formation, left-wing political parties and other political groups criticized the Local Defence companies for being too close to the White Guard, abolished after World War II, while some civilian organizations such as the Finnish Red Cross said that Local Defence companies shouldn't take part in operations that fall under their area of expertise, such as peacetime volunteer rescue service.

== See also ==
- Estonian Defence League
- White Guard (Finland)
- National Defence Training Association of Finland
