= National Defence Training Association of Finland =

"Three bear claws", the logo of the association

National Defence Training Association of Finland (Finnish: Maanpuolustuskoulutusyhdistys, Swedish: Försvarsutbildningsföreningen) is a voluntary organization providing safety and security training to all Finnish residents over the age of 15 and supplemental military training for all Finnish citizens over the age of 18.

== Organization ==
The National Defence Training Association of Finland is a statutory corporation provided for in the "Act on Voluntary Defence Activities" (Finnish: Laki vapaaehtoisesta maanpuolustustyöstä). It is constituted as a voluntary association, the members of which are the main NGOs active in the field of Finnish total defence. The members are

- Kadettikunta (Corps of Cadets, the voluntary ideological organization of career officers)
- Maanpuolustuskiltojen liitto (League of the National Defence Guilds)
- Maanpuolustusnaisten liitto (League of the National Defence Women)
- Naisten Valmiusliitto (League for Women's preparedness)
- Nylands Brigads Gille (The Nyland Brigade Guild)
- Reserviläisliitto (Reservists' Association)
- Reserviläisurheiluliitto (Reservists' sports Association)
- Sininen Reservi (The Blue Reserve, a naval reserve association)
- Sotilaskotiliitto (Soldiers' Home Association, a non-profit association that upkeeps Soldier's Homes (Sotilaskoti in Finnish), kind of Canteens in all of regular military garrisons in Finland)
- Suomen Ampumaurheiluliitto (Finnish Sport Shooting Federation)
- Suomen Lentopelastusseura (Finnish Aerial Rescue Association)
- Suomen Metsästäjäliitto (Finnish Hunters' Association)
- Suomen Rauhanturvaajaliitto (Finnish Peace-Keeping Veterans' Association)
- Suomen Reserviupseeriliitto (Finnish Reserve Officers' Association)

The purpose of the association is to pursue the advancement of national defence by training, education and emission of information. The government has delegated to the association the public duty to organize voluntary military training and other training serving the military preparedness. To ensure the political control of this activity, five of nine members of the board of the association are selected by the Finnish government, the remaining four being elected by member associations.

As an organization, the association is divided into 21 districts corresponding to the Regions of Finland. After the Defence Forces structural reform of 2008, the voluntary national defence district also corresponds the military district of the Defence Forces. Each district works closely with the military authorities in the area.

== Training ==
The National Defence Training Association of Finland organizes four types of training. Safety training is non-military training aimed at the general public with the objective of increasing first aid skills and overall crisis preparedness. Preparedness training is also non-military but offered mostly to the persons in municipal or church administration. The objective of the preparedness training is to increase the capability of the civil organizations to remain active in different crisis scenarios ranging from nature disasters to military crises. About one half of all training given by the association is safety and preparedness training.

The military training offered by the association is organized as short courses, which the Finnish Defence Forces or the Finnish Border Guard orders and pays. The association organizes the courses ordered by the Defence Forces using its voluntary training personnel. The law states that the association may not organize exercises for units larger than a company.

The purposes of the training courses are

- to maintain skills and knowledge learned during conscription
- to train personnel for more demanding duties
- to familiarize reservists with changes in national defence structures and activities
- to train units in their war-time composition

In contrast to the refresher exercise of the Finnish Defence Forces, the military courses of the association may be participated not only by military reservists but also by non-reservist men and women. These persons may serve in non-combat duties. All persons serving in a military course ordered by the Defence Forces and organized by the National Defence Training Association are subject to military criminal law during the duration of the course.

The courses where weapons or other Defence Forces equipment are not used are less military in nature, although even they are meant to enhance the capabilities of participants to work in different areas of national defence.

== Equipment ==
While the National Defence Training Association of Finland uses mostly equipment of its member organisations or the Finnish Defence Forces, the organisation also owns some weaponry for carrying out the training it provides.

| Model | Origin | Type | Quantity | Image | Details |
Semi-automatic rifles
| Sako ARG S 40 MPK | Finland | Semi-automatic rifle | | | Standard semi-automatic rifle for rifle training. |
| Dasan DSAR-15 | Republic of Korea | Semi-automatic rifle | | | Replacement for the original MPK-kivääri (Dasan DAK-47), which were removed from service due to multiple failures of the action. |
Precision rifles
| MPK tarkkuuskivääri m22 | Finland | Sniper rifle | | | A proprietary variant of Tikka T3x TACT A1 in .308 Winchester. Equipped with a Steiner M7Xi 2.9–20×50 sight. |
| MPK tarkkuuspienoiskivääri m22 | Finland | Rimfire precision rifle | | | A proprietary variant of Tikka T1x in .22 long rifle, as identical as possible to the MPK Tarkkuuskivääri m22, to facilitate sniper training. Equipped with a Steiner M7Xi 2.9–20×50 sight. |

== See also ==
- Finnish Defence Forces
- Local Defence troops (Finland)
