= Finnish Defence Forces =

Armed forces of Finland

- Puolustusvoimat (Finnish); Försvarsmakten (Swedish)
- Emblem of the Finnish Defence Forces

- Military flag of Finland
- Founded: 25 January 1918; 108 years ago
- Service branches: Finnish Army; Finnish Navy; Finnish Air Force
- Website: Official website

Leadership
- President: Alexander Stubb
- Minister of Defence: Antti Häkkänen
- Chief of Defence: General Janne Jaakkola

Personnel
- Military age: 18
- Conscription: 165, 255, or 347 days term
- Active personnel: 24,000 (2023), 280,000 (wartime)
- Reserve personnel: 870,000
- Deployed personnel: 486

Expenditure
- Budget: €6.5 billion (2025)
- Percent of GDP: 2.3% (2024)

Industry
- Domestic suppliers: Patria; Robonic; SAKO; Sisu Auto
- Foreign suppliers: Germany; Israel; Norway; Sweden; United States
- Annual exports: €133 million (2016)

Related articles
- Ranks: Finnish military ranks

Björneborgarnas marsch (MID)
"March of the Björneborgers" or "March of the Pori Regiment" from the 19th century; known as the military anthem of the Finnish Defence Force

The Finnish Defence Forces (FDF) (Finnish: Puolustusvoimat; Swedish: Försvarsmakten) are the military of Finland. The Finnish Defence Forces consist of the Finnish Army, the Finnish Navy, and the Finnish Air Force. In wartime, the Finnish Border Guard becomes part of the Finnish Defence Forces.

Universal male conscription is in place, under which all mentally and physically capable men serve for 165, 255, or 347 days, from the year they turn 18 until the year they turn 29. Alternative non-military service for men and voluntary service for women is available.

Finland's official policy states that a wartime military strength of 280,000 personnel constitutes a sufficient deterrent. The army consists of a highly mobile field army backed up by local defence units. The army defends the national territory and its military strategy employs the use of the heavily forested terrain and numerous lakes to wear down an aggressor, instead of attempting to hold the attacking army on the frontier.

Finland's defence budget for 2025 equals approximately €6.5 billion. The voluntary overseas service is highly popular and troops serve around the world in UN, NATO, and EU missions. With an arsenal of 700 howitzers, 700 heavy mortars and 100 multiple rocket launchers, Finland has the largest artillery capability in western Europe. Homeland defence willingness against a superior enemy is at 83%, one of the highest rates in Europe. The air force has 62 F/A-18 combat aircraft from 1995, to be replaced with 64 F-35 aircraft in 2026 by the HX Fighter Program.

The Finnish Defence Forces cooperate closely with the Finnish Border Guard. The Finnish Border Guard has its own yearly and long-term investment budget.

== History ==
=== Civil War ===
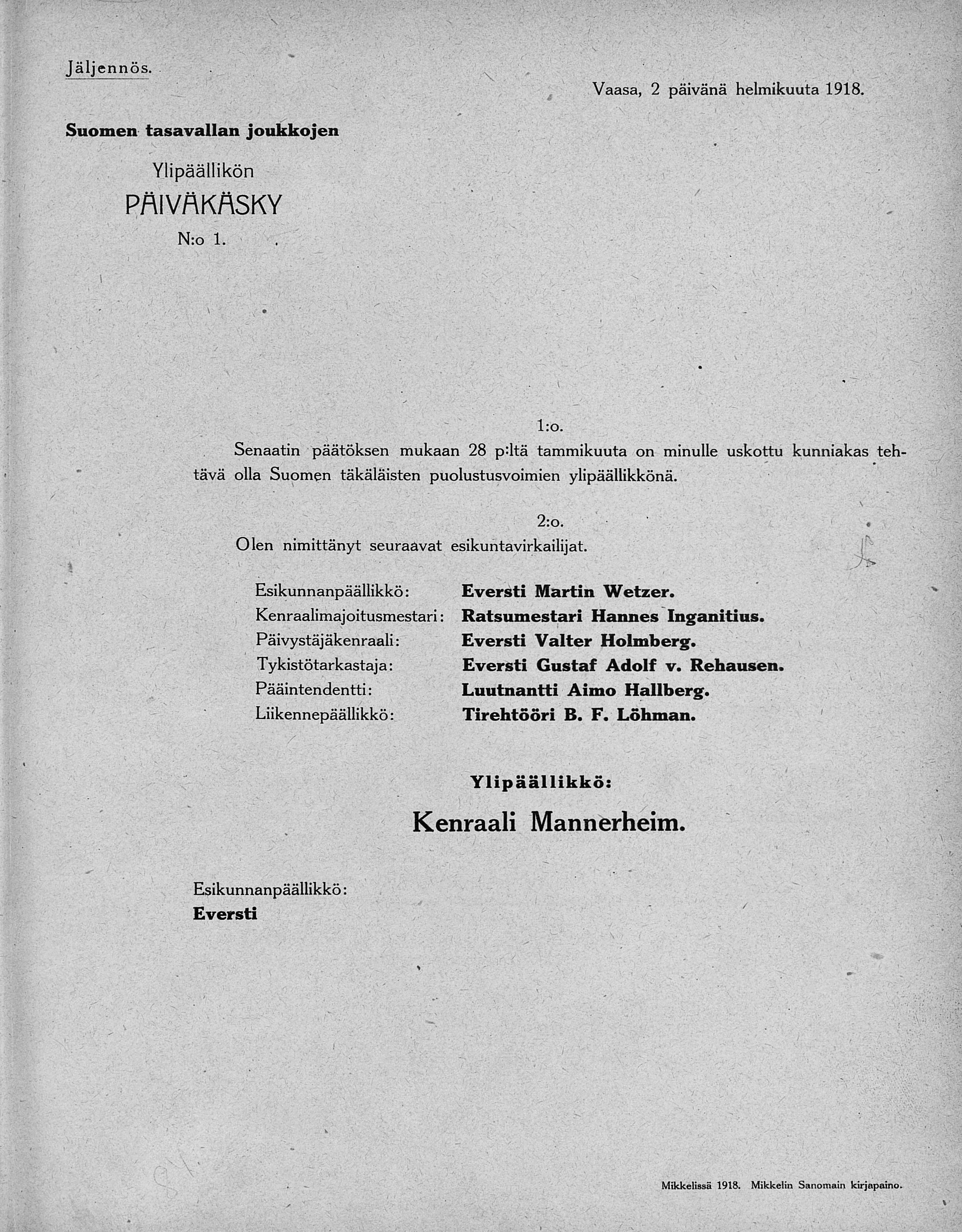
Establishment of the first headquarters of the Finnish Defence Forces on 2 February 1918

After Finland's declaration of independence on 6 December 1917, the Civil Guards were proclaimed the troops of the government on 25 January 1918 and then Lieutenant General of the Russian Imperial Army Carl Gustaf Emil Mannerheim was appointed as Commander-in-Chief of these forces the next day. Fighting between the White Guards (as the Civil Guards were commonly known) and the Red Guards had already broken out about a week before around Viipuri, in what became known as the Finnish Civil War.

In the war, the Whites were victorious in large part thanks to the leadership of General Mannerheim and the lead by example offensive mindedness of 1,800 German-trained Finnish Jägers, who brought with them German tactical doctrine and military culture. The post-war years were characterized by the Volunteer Campaigns that came to an end in 1920 with the signing of the Treaty of Tartu, which ended the state of war between Finland and Soviet Russia and defined the internationally recognized borders of Finland.

=== Interwar years ===
After winning the Civil War, the Finnish peacetime army was organized as three divisions and a brigade by professional German officers. It became the basic structure for the next 20 years. The coast was guarded by former czarist coastal fortifications and ships taken as prizes of war. The Air Force had already been formed in March 1918, but remained a part of the Army and did not become a fully independent fighting force until 1928. The White Guard (Suojeluskunta) played a key role in interwar Finnish defence policy, as they essentially served as local/territorial militia forces, and some had higher readiness and training for quick mobilization.

The new government instituted conscription after the Civil War and also introduced a mobilization system and compulsory refresher courses for reservists. An academy providing basic officer training (Kadettikoulu) was established in 1919, the founding of a General Staff College (Sotakorkeakoulu) followed in 1924, and in 1927 a tactical training school (Taistelukoulu) for company-grade and junior officers and NCOs was set up. The requirement of one year of compulsory service was greater than that imposed by any other Scandinavian country in the 1920s and the 1930s, but political opposition to defence spending left the military badly equipped to resist an attack by the Soviet Union, the only security threat in Finnish eyes.

=== World War II ===
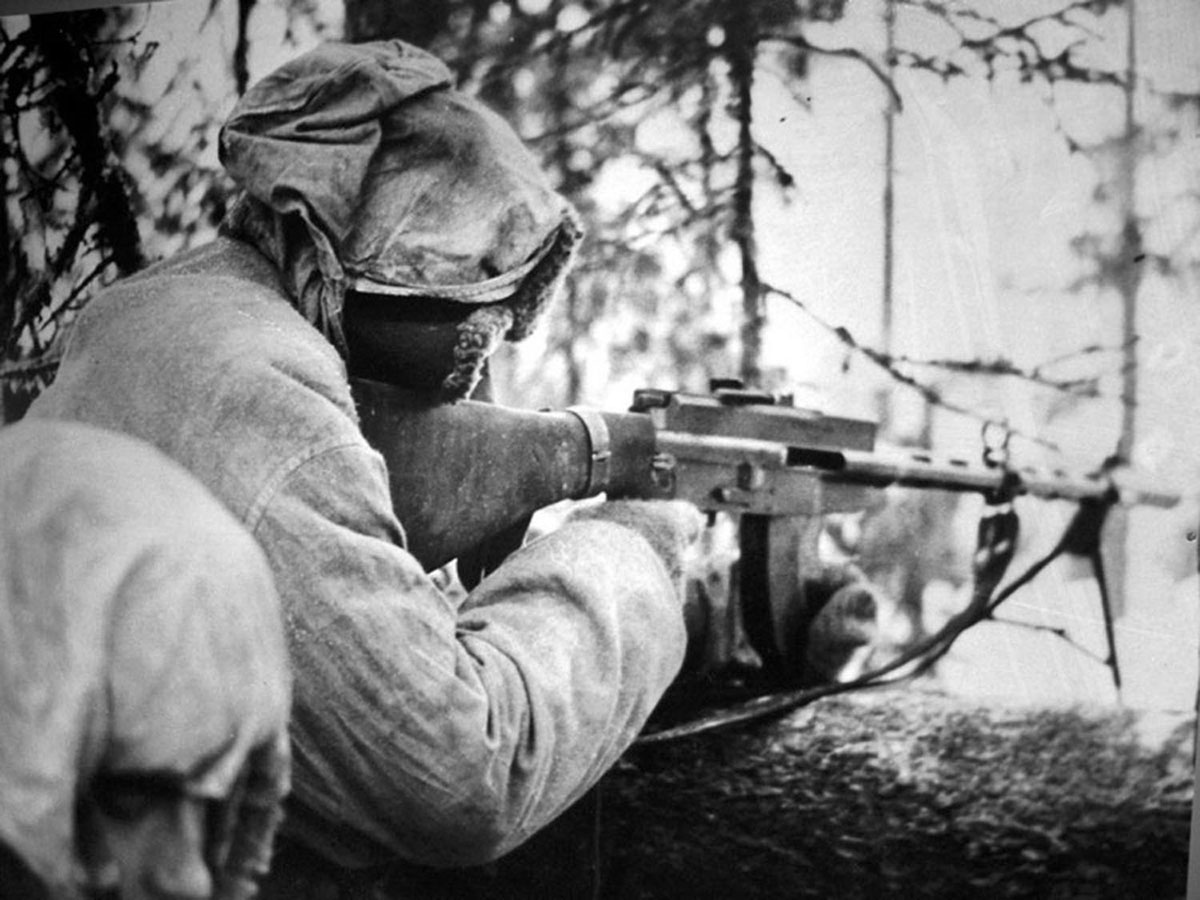
Finnish soldier equipped with Lahti-Saloranta M-26 during the Winter War

When the Soviets invaded in November 1939, the Finns, led by Marshal Mannerheim, defeated the Red Army on numerous occasions, including at the crucial Battle of Suomussalmi. These successes were in large part thanks to the application of motti tactics. Finland successfully defended its independence but ceded 9% of its territory per the Moscow Peace Treaty. During the war, the Finns lost 25,904 men, while the Soviet losses were 167,976 dead.

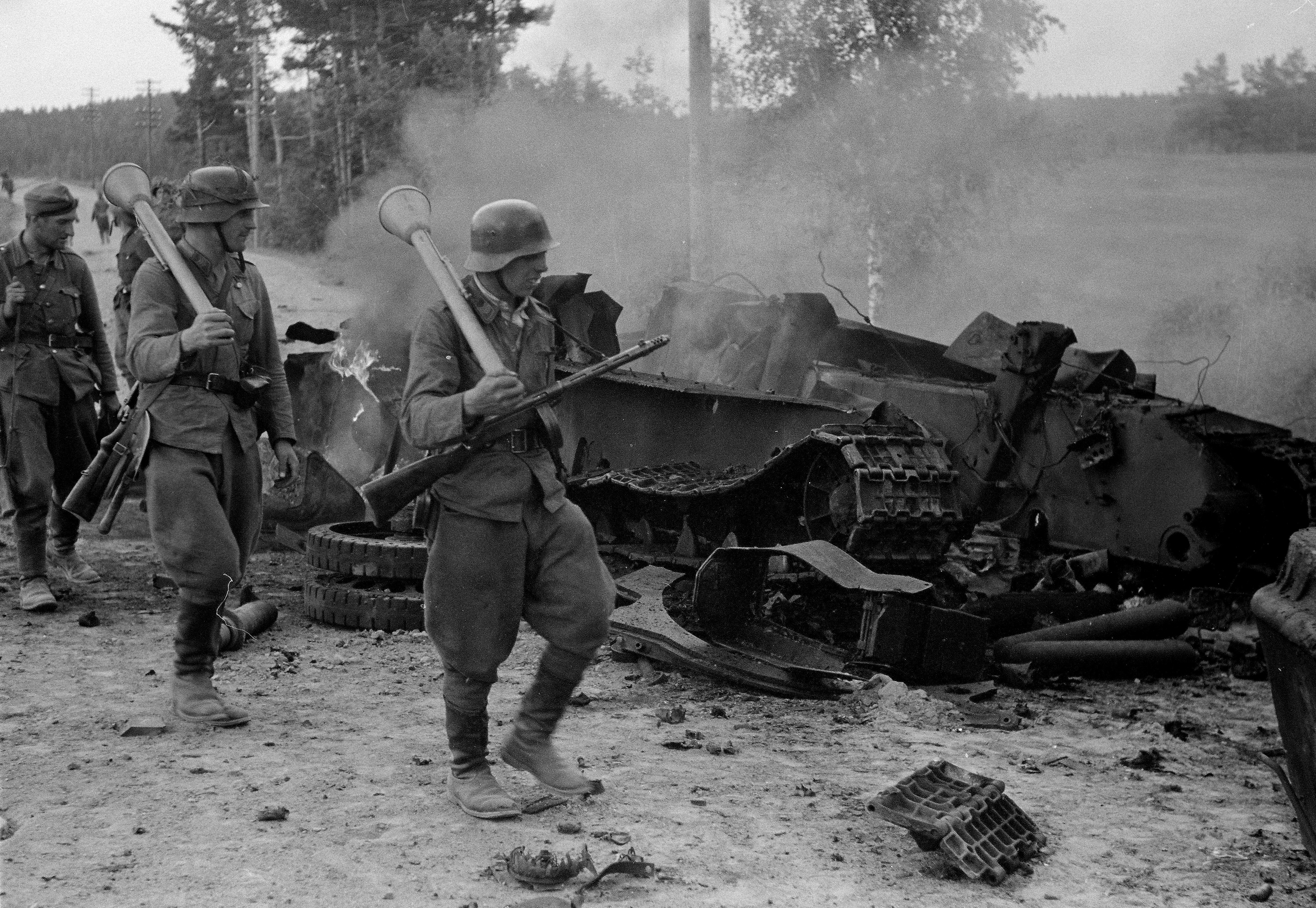
Finnish troops equipped with Panzerfaust antitank weapons walk past a destroyed Soviet T-34 tank during the Battle of Tali-Ihantala. The lead soldier is also armed with a Suomi KP/-31.

Finland fought in the Continuation War alongside Germany from 1941 to 1944. Thanks to Nazi-German aid, the army was much better equipped, and the period of conscription was increased to two years, making possible the formation of sixteen infantry divisions. Having initially deployed on the defensive, the Finns took advantage of the weakened Soviet positions as a consequence of Operation Barbarossa, swiftly recovering their lost territories and invading Soviet territory in Karelia, after settling into defensive positions in December 1941. The Soviet offensive of June 1944 undid these Finnish gains and, while failing in its objective of destroying the Finnish army and forcing Finland's unconditional surrender, forced Finland out of the war. The Finns were able to preserve their independence with key defensive victories over the Red Army, the Battle of Tali-Ihantala being very significant.

==== Impact of World War II on the later Armed Forces - into the cold war and present day ====
During the Cold War, the FAF had to conceal much of its war planning and preparations, which were directed against an Soviet invasion. The size of the Finnish Armed Forces has remained large ever since;

- In 1973 it had 34,000 Army, 2,500 Navy, 3,000 Air Force personnel as well as 685,000 reserves. No Wartime figure given.
- In 1992, just after the Cold war, 32,800 active personnel as well as 700,000 reserves, out of which 50,000 had annually refresher training. The Wartime strength being 500,000.
- By 2000, 31,700 were in active service, 485,000 Reservists with 485,000 given as the wartime strength. 35,000 doing refresher training annually.
- By 2014, 22,200 were in active service, 354,000 Reservists. 25,000 doing refresher training annually.

These conflicts involving Finland had a significant impact on the modern Finnish defence force. While other European militaries have reduced their forces, Finland has maintained a large conscript-based reserve army. As a Swedish report stated: "The reason why the FDF chose to maintain this model while its Nordic neighbors jumped on the expeditionary bandwagon is not hard to see. Sharing a 1340km border with Russia, the need for large ground forces is self-explanatory. Furthermore, memories of World War II – in which over 2 percent of the population perished in two brutal wars with the Soviet Union – are very much alive in Finland". This same aspect has been highlighted even more strongly after the Russian invasion of Ukraine and Finland's decision to join NATO. With quotes like; "After World War II, having thwarted the advance of the mighty Red Army in the Winter War of 1939-40 and then seeking to recapture the territory the Soviets eventually claimed, Finland had to settle for neutrality imposed by Moscow. But to almost everyone's surprise, it succeeded in this degrading task, too, building up armed forces that were highly capable and were energetically supported by civil society—while at the same time managing to maintain dialogue with Moscow.", "Finland still has compulsory military service. Finland would be in a position to mobilize an army of 280,000 soldiers. That's quite a big army in modern Europe", with similar views being expressed elsewhere as well, often referring to the fact that Finland has kept its conscript-based armed force or other readiness-related units, contrasting with other European countries that now have to re-arm, such as Germany as an example. During the events of 2022, all this has received attention internationally as well.

=== Cold War ===
The demobilization and regrouping of the Finnish Defence Forces were carried out in late 1944 under the supervision of the Soviet-dominated Allied Control Commission. Following the Treaty of Paris in 1947, which imposed restrictions on the size and equipment of the armed forces and required disbandment of the Civic Guard, Finland reorganized its defence forces. The fact that the conditions of the peace treaty did not include prohibitions on reserves or mobilization made it possible to contemplate an adequate defence establishment within the prescribed limits. The reorganization resulted in the adoption of the brigade -in place of the division- as the standard formation.

For the first two decades after the Second World War, the Finnish Defence Forces relied largely on obsolete wartime material. Defence spending remained minimal until the early 1960s. During the peak of the Cold War, the Finnish government made a conscious effort to increase defence capability. This resulted in the commissioning of several new weapons systems and the strengthening of the defence of Finnish Lapland by the establishment of new garrisons in the area. From 1968 onwards, the Finnish government adopted the doctrine of territorial defence, which requires the use of large land areas to delay and wear out a potential aggressor. The doctrine was complemented by the concept of total defence which calls for the use of all resources of society for national defence in case of a crisis. From the mid-1960s onwards, the Finnish Defence Forces also began to specifically prepare to defeat a strategic strike, the kind which the Soviet Union employed successfully to topple the government of Czechoslovakia in 1968. In an all-out confrontation between the two major blocs, the Finnish objective would have been to prevent any military incursions in Finnish territory and thereby keep Finland outside the war.

=== Post-1991 ===
The collapse of the Soviet Union in 1991 did not eliminate the military threat perceived by the government, but the nature of the threat had changed. While the concept of total, territorial defence was not dropped, military planning has moved towards the capability to prevent and frustrate a strategic attack toward the vital regions of the country.

The end of the Cold War also allowed new opportunities which would have previously been seen as breaking Finland's stance of neutrality, such as participation in the War in Afghanistan and the Nordic Battlegroup.

In 2013-2014 there was societal debate as to whether to abolish the conscription model from earlier, with a motion having gathered 4,000 signatures to move towards a professional force. Ari Puheloinen stated that such an force would cost about double the then conscription model and produce an mobilized force of 40,000.

With the change in the European security environment brought by the 2022 Russian invasion of Ukraine, Finnish government officials began voicing increasingly strong support for joining NATO, buttressed by polls showing a rapid increase in Finnish citizens' willingness to join NATO. NATO Secretary General Jens Stoltenberg voiced his support in April 2022 for the inclusion of Finland into the Euro-Atlantic defence alliance and stated that NATO member countries would likely enthusiastically support a Finland bid for membership.

On 11 May 2022, British Prime Minister Boris Johnson and Finnish President Sauli Niinistö signed a new mutual defence agreement "to reinforce their security and fortify northern Europe's defences, in the face of renewed threats." This has helped to address concerns within Finland that the delay between application and acceptance to NATO, during which time Finland would not yet be able to invoke NATO Article 5 and may present an opportunity for a Russian invasion.

On 12 May 2022, Niinistö and Prime Minister Sanna Marin issued a joint statement supporting Finland's application for membership of NATO, saying "As a member of NATO, Finland would strengthen the entire defence alliance. Finland must apply for NATO membership without delay." On 17 May 2022, the Parliament of Finland voted overwhelmingly to apply for membership of NATO, with 188 votes in favour of the motion and 8 against. The following morning, the Finnish ambassador to NATO, Klaus Korhonen, formally submitted Finland's application to NATO Secretary General Jens Stoltenberg. Sweden also submitted its application at the same time.

On 29 June 2022, thirty NATO countries invited Finland and Sweden to join NATO. Both countries received the status of aspiring members while attending the annual NATO summit in Madrid as guest nations. Finland became a full NATO member on 4 April 2023.

As of 2025, the Defence Forces are undergoing key procurement programmes for all the three branches. The Navy is scheduled to get its largest vessels since the WW2-era Väinämöinen class with the new Pohjanmaa class. The Air Force has made the decision to acquire the Lockheed Martin F-35A to replace all McDonnell Douglas F/A-18 Hornet fighter jets for €10 billion. Meanwhile, the Army is planning to complement the modernized Patria Pasi armoured vehicles with the Finnish Patria 6×6. The standard issue assault rifle RK 62 is also being upgraded to a new variant. A new high altitude air defence missile system was selected in April 2023, Rafael's David's Sling system.

== Organization ==
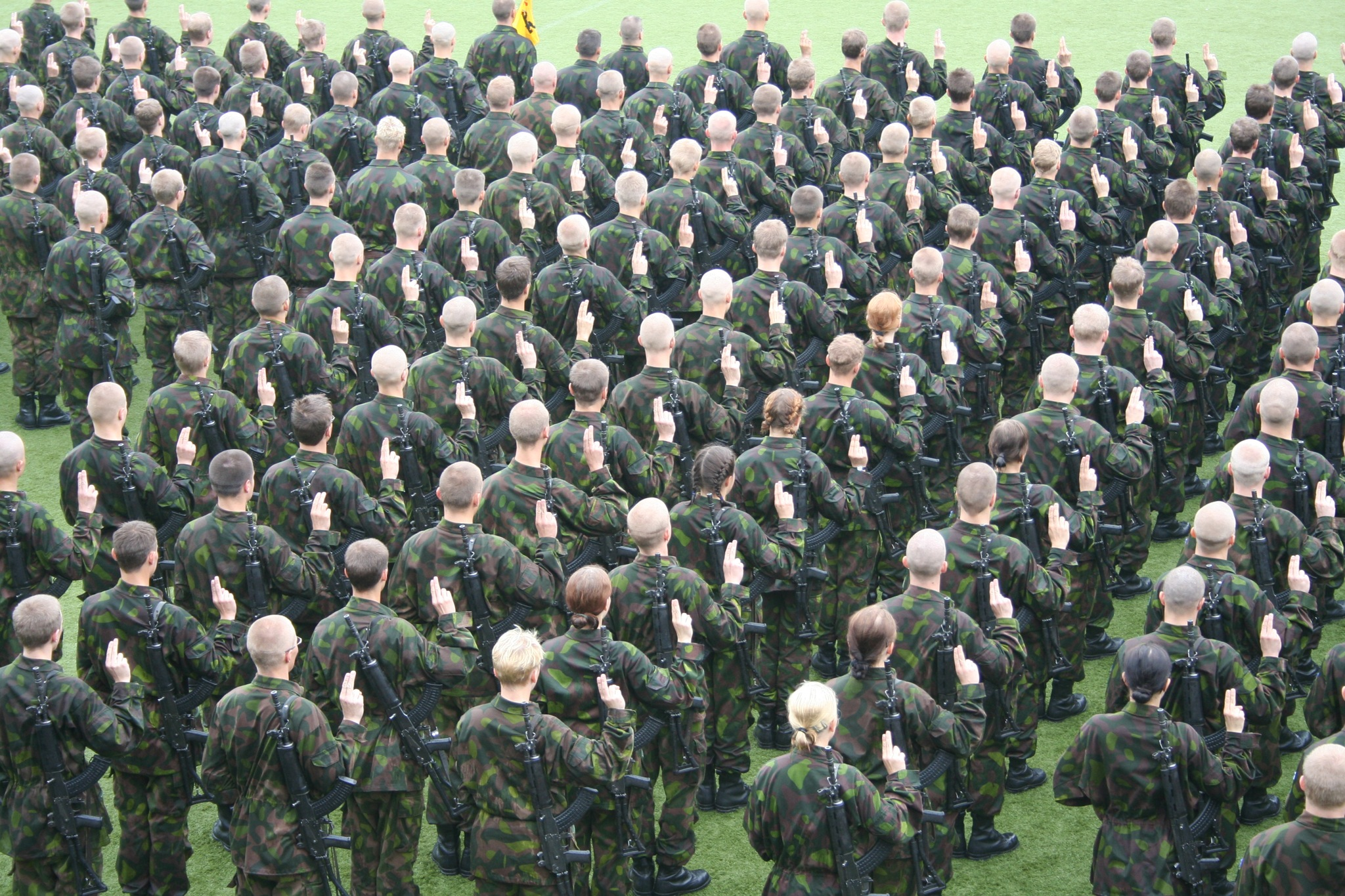
Finnish soldiers taking the Finnish Defence Forces military oath

The Finnish Defence Forces are under the command of the Chief of Defence, who is directly subordinate to the President of the Republic in matters related to the military command. Decisions concerning military orders are made by the President of the Republic in consultation with the Prime Minister and the Minister of Defence.

Apart from the Defence Command (Finnish: Pääesikunta, Swedish: Huvudstaben), the military branches are the Finnish Army (Finnish: Maavoimat, Swedish: Armén), the Finnish Navy (Finnish: Merivoimat, Swedish: Marinen) and the Finnish Air Force (Finnish: Ilmavoimat, Swedish: Flygvapnet). The Border Guard (Finnish: Rajavartiolaitos, Swedish: Gränsbevakningsväsendet) (including the coast guard) is under the authority of the Ministry of the Interior, but can be incorporated fully or in part into the defence forces when required by defence readiness. All logistical duties of the Defence Forces are carried out by the Defence Forces Logistics Command (Finnish: Puolustusvoimien logistiikkalaitos), which includes three logistics regiments.

The Army is divided into eight brigade-level units (Finnish: joukko-osasto). Under the brigades, there were 12 military districts, which were responsible for carrying out the draft, training and crisis-time activation of reservists and for planning and executing territorial defence of their areas. The military districts were disbanded in 2014, as a part of the 800 million euro savings the Finnish Defence Forces had to carry out. Their duties are now carried out by regional offices (Finnish: aluetoimisto).

The Navy consists of headquarters and four brigade-level units: Coastal Fleet (Finnish: Rannikkolaivasto), Coastal Brigade (Finnish: Rannikkoprikaati), Nyland Brigade (Finnish: Uudenmaan Prikaati, Swedish: Nylands Brigad), and Naval Academy (Finnish: Merisotakoulu). The Coastal Fleet includes all the surface combatants of the Navy, while Coastal Brigade and Nyland Brigade train coastal troops.

The Air Force consists of headquarters and four brigade-level units: Satakunta, Lapland and Karelian Air Wings (Finnish: lennosto) and Air Force Academy (Finnish: Ilmasotakoulu). They are responsible for securing the integrity of the Finnish airspace during peace and for conducting aerial warfare independently during a crisis.

The military training of the reservists is primarily the duty of the Defence Forces, but it is assisted by the National Defence Training Association of Finland (Finnish: Maanpuolustuskoulutusyhdistys). This association provides reservists with personal, squad, platoon and company level military training. Most of the 2,000 instructors of the association are volunteers certified by the Defence Forces, but when Defence Forces materiel is used, the training always takes place under the supervision of career military personnel. Annually, the Defence Forces requests the Association to run specialized exercises for some 8,500 personnel placed in reserve units, and an additional 16,500 reservists participate in military courses where the participants are not directly selected by the Defence Forces. The legislation concerning the association will require that the chairman and the majority of the members of its board are chosen by the Finnish Government. The other board members are chosen by NGOs active in the national defence.

== General officers ==
=== The Finnish Defence Forces ===
Chief of Defence General Janne Jaakkola

=== Defence Command ===
Chief of Defence Command Finland Lieutenant General Vesa Virtanen

Deputy Chief of Staff, Logistics and Armaments Lieutenant General Mikko Heiskanen

Deputy Chief of Staff, Strategy Major General Sami Nurmi

Deputy Chief of Staff, Operations Major General Kari Nisula

Deputy Chief of Staff, Personnel Major General Rami Saari

Chief of Planning Brigadier General Tero Ylitalo

Assistant Chief of Staff Operations Commodore Janne Huusko

Defence Command Chief of C5 Brigadier General Jarmo Vähätiitto

Chief of Personnel (J1) Commodore Tuomas Tiilikainen

Chief of Logistics Brigadier General Timo Saarinen

Assistant Chief of Staff, Training (J7) Brigadier General Manu Tuominen

Defence Command Chief of Intelligence Brigadier General Pekka Turunen

Chief Surgeon Commodore Medical Juha-Petri Ruohola

Field Bishop Jukka Pekka Asikainen

=== Army ===
Commander of the Finnish Army Lieutenant General Pasi Välimäki

Chief of Staff, Army Major General Jukka Jokinen

Chief of Operations, Army Command Brigadier General Sami-Antti Takamaa

Commander of Karelia Brigade Brigadier General Jyri Raitasalo

Commander of Kainuu Brigade Brigadier General Ari Laaksonen

Commander of Pori Brigade Brigadier General Jami Virta

=== Navy ===
Commander of the Finnish Navy Rear Admiral Jori Harju

Chief of Staff, Navy Commodore Jukka Anteroinen

=== Air Force ===
Commander of the Finnish Air Force Major General Timo Herranen

Chief of Staff, Air Force Brigadier General Aki Puustinen

=== National Defence University ===
Rector of The National Defence University Major General Mika Kalliomaa

=== Special assignments ===
Military Representative to the EU and NATO Lieutenant General Kim Jäämeri

=== Defence Forces Logistics Command ===
Chief of Finnish Defence Forces Logistics Command Major General Tero Ylitalo (2024)

Deputy Manager, Logistic Command Brigadier General Engineering Juha-Matti Ylitalo

== Conscription ==
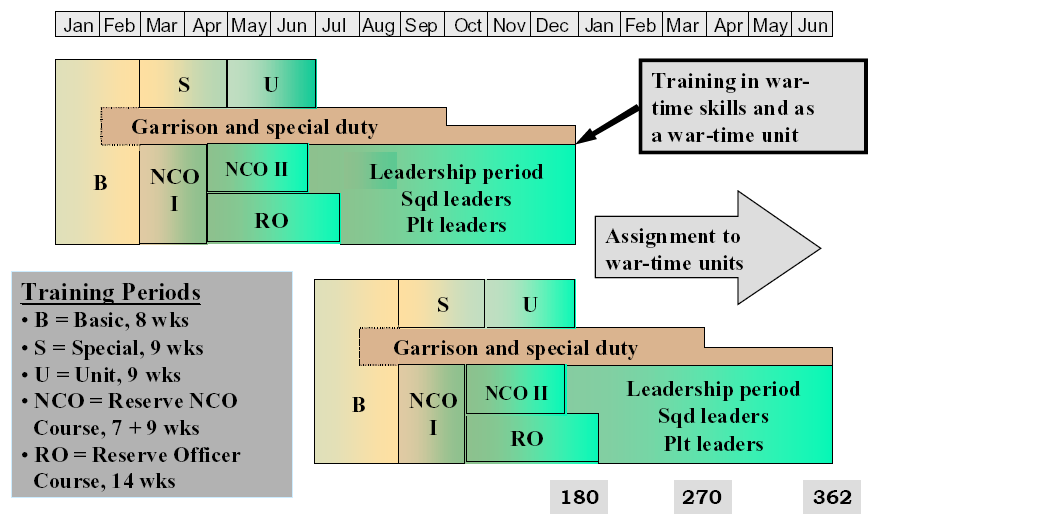
Figure illustrating the organization of Finnish conscript training

The Finnish Defence Forces are based on universal male conscription. All men above 18 years of age are liable to serve either six, nine, or 12 months. Some 27,000 conscripts are trained annually. 65% of Finnish men complete their service. The conscripts at first receive basic training, after which they are assigned to various units for special training. Privates who are trained for tasks not requiring special skills serve for six months. In technically demanding tasks the time of service is nine, or in some cases 12 months. Those selected for NCO (non-commissioned officer) or officer training serve 12 months. At the completion of the service, the conscripts receive a reserve military rank of private, lance corporal, corporal, sergeant or second lieutenant, depending on their training and accomplishments. After their military service, the conscripts are placed in reserve until the end of their 50th or 60th living year, depending on their military rank. During their time in reserve, the reservists are liable to participate in military refresher exercises for a total of 40, 75 or 100 days, depending on their military rank. In addition, all reservists are liable for activation in a situation where the military threat against Finland has seriously increased, in full or partial mobilization or in a large-scale disaster or a virulent epidemic. The males who do not belong to the reserve may only be activated in case of full mobilization, and those rank-and-file personnel who have reached 50 years of age only with a specific parliamentary decision.

Military service can be started after turning 18. The service can be delayed due to studies, work or other personal reasons until the 28th birthday, but these reasons do not result in exemptions. In addition to lodging, food, clothes and health care the conscripts receive between 6.10 and 14.15 euros per day, depending on the time they have served. The state also pays for any rental and electricity bills the conscripts incur during their service. If the conscripts have families, they are entitled to benefits as well. It is illegal to fire an employee due to military service or due to a refresher exercise or activation. Voluntary females in military service receive a small additional benefit, because they are expected to provide their own underwear and other personal items.

The military service consists of lessons, practical training, various cleaning and maintenance duties and field exercises. Most weekends conscripts can leave the barracks on Friday and are expected to return by midnight on Sunday. A small force of conscripts are kept in readiness on weekends to aid civil agencies in various types of emergency situations, to guard the premises and to maintain defence in case of a sudden military emergency. Field exercises can go on regardless of the time of day or week.

The training of conscripts is based on joukkotuotanto-principle (lit. English troop production). In this system, 80% of the conscripts are trained to fulfill a specific role in a specific wartime military unit. Each brigade-level unit is responsible for producing specified reserve units from the conscripts it has been allocated. As the reservists are discharged, they receive a specific wartime placement in the unit with which they have trained during their conscription. As the conscripts age, their unit is given new, different tasks and materiel. Typically, reservists are placed for the first five years in first-line units, then moved to military formations with less demanding tasks, while the reservists unable to serve in the unit are substituted with reservists from the reserve without specific placement. In refresher exercises, the unit is then given new training for these duties, if the defence funding permits this.

The inhabitants of the demilitarized Åland islands are exempt from military service. By the Conscription act of 1950, they are however required to serve a time at a local institution, like the coast guard instead. However, until such service has been arranged, they are freed from service obligation. The non-military service of the Åland islands has not been arranged since the introduction of the act, and there are no plans to institute it. The inhabitants of the Åland islands can also volunteer for military service on the mainland. Jehovah's Witnesses were exempt until February 2019. It is also possible to serve either weapon-free military service of 255 or 347 days or undergo a 12-month-long non-military service. Finnish law requires that men who do not want to serve the defence of the country in any capacity (so-called total objectors) be sentenced to a prison term of 173 days. As of 1995, women were permitted to serve on a voluntary basis and pursue careers as officers. In conscription, women have a consideration time of 30 days, during which they have the choice to halt their service without any other specific reason. After the said 30 days, all the same laws and jurisdictions apply to them as to men. Unlike in many other countries, women are allowed to serve in all combat arms including front-line infantry and special forces.

== Military ranks ==
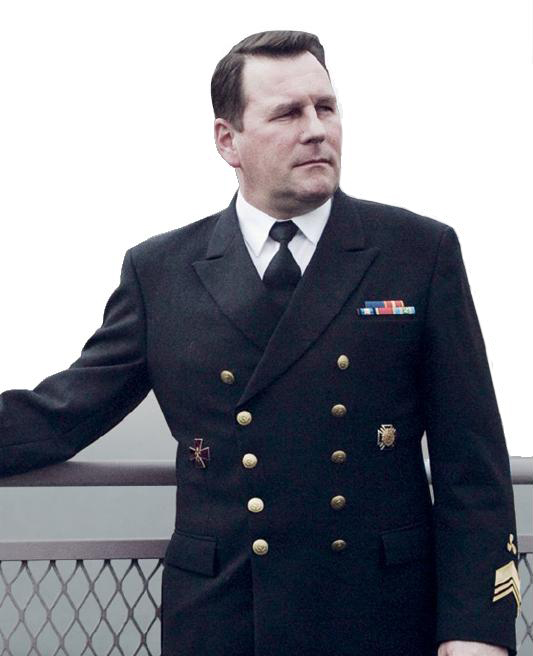
Finnish Navy Master Chief Petty Officer (machine branch)

The Finnish military ranks follow the Western usage in the officer ranks. As a Finnish peculiarity, the rank of lieutenant has three grades: 2nd lieutenant, lieutenant and senior lieutenant. The 2nd lieutenant is a reserve officer rank, active commissioned officers beginning their service as lieutenants.

The basic structure of the NCO ranks is a variant of the German rank structure, but the rank system has some peculiarities due to different personnel groups. The duties carried out by NCOs in most Western armed forces are carried out by

- warrant officers (opistoupseeri) serving in the ranks from lieutenant to captain. This personnel group is being phased out.
- career NCOs serving in the ranks from enlistee (sotilasammattihenkilö), sergeant, staff sergeant, sergeant first class (gunnery sergeant is equivalent), master sergeant and sergeant major (sotilasmestari). Career NCO's with rank of sergeant have a sword symbol in their insignia to distinguish them from conscript sergeants.
- contractual military personnel (sopimussotilas) serving in the ranks of corporal, sergeant and 2nd lieutenant (reserve officers)
- conscripts in the ranks of corporal, officer student, sergeant and officer candidate.

In a case of war, most of the NCO duties would be carried out by reserve NCOs who have received their training during conscription.

The rank and file of the Finnish Defence Forces is composed of conscripts serving in the ranks of private, lance corporal and NCO student.

== Equipment ==
Finnish Defence Forces Materiel and equipment photos.

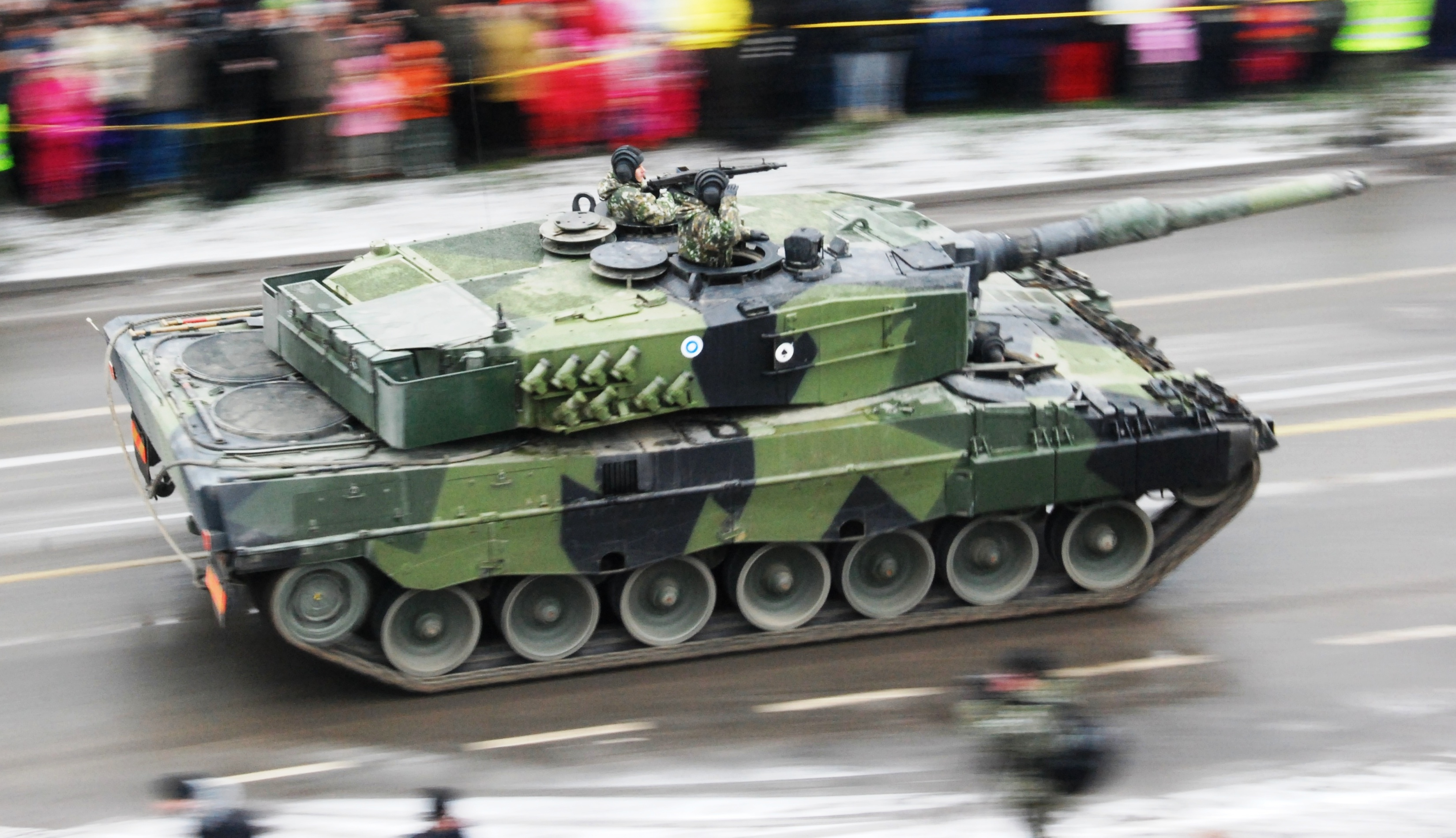
Finnish Leopard 2A4 main battle tank on parade in Riihimäki, Finland

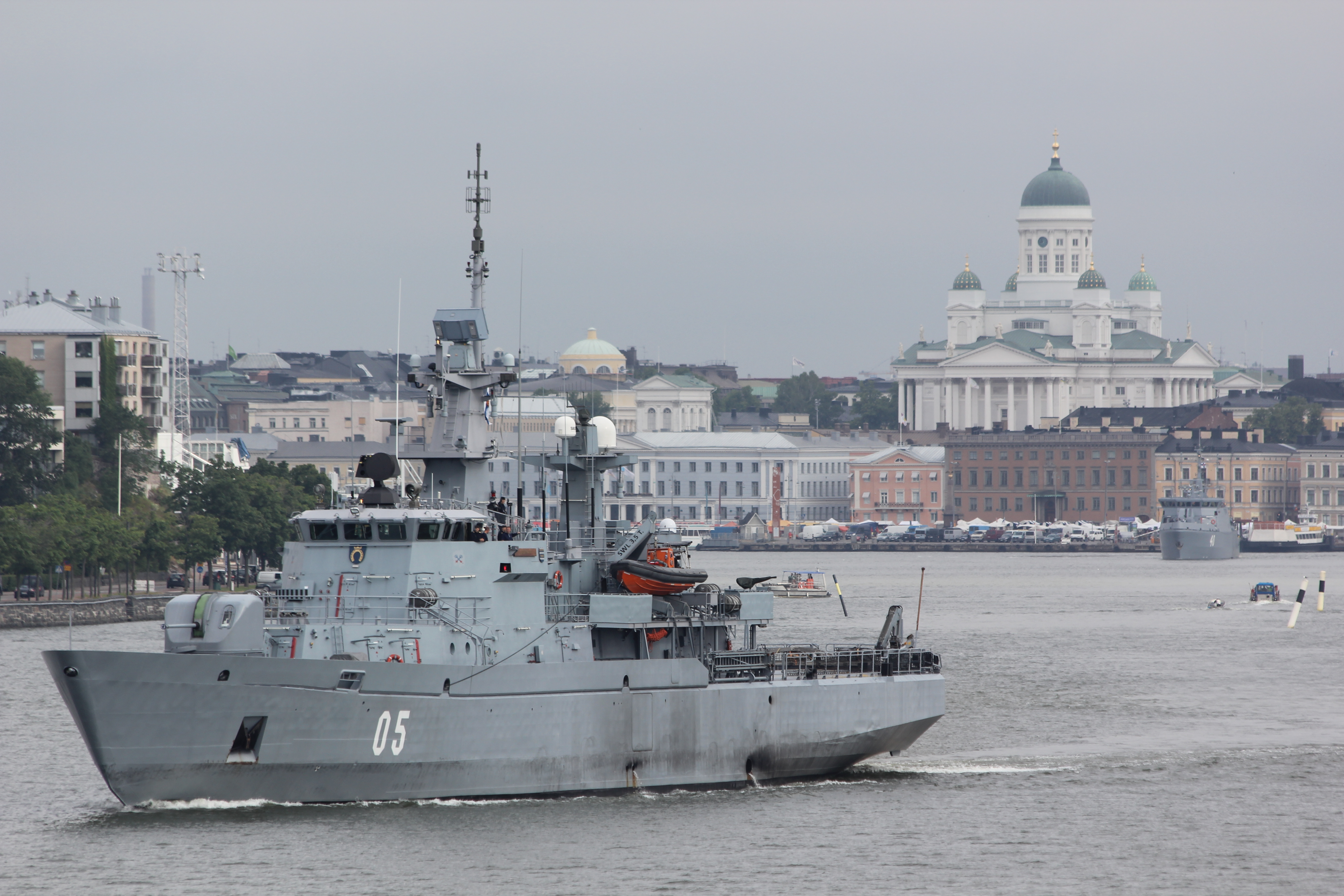
Finnish minelayer Uusimaa and Katanpää-class mine countermeasure vessel in Helsinki

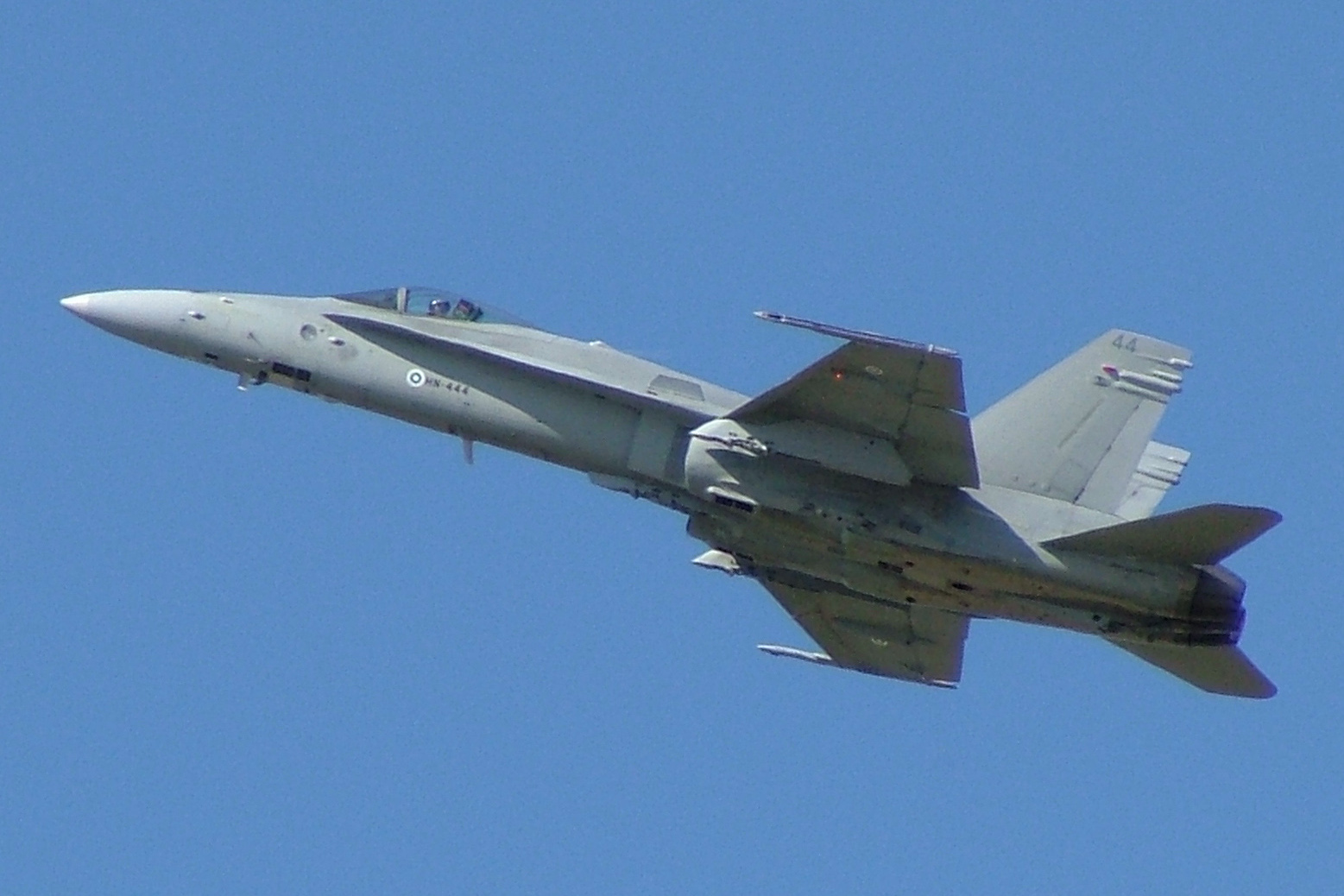
Finnish Air Force F-18C Hornet

Equipment	Numbers
Main battle tanks	239
Infantry fighting vehicles Armoured personnel carriers Armoured vehicle-launched bridges Heavy mine breaching vehicles	212; 860; 18; 6
Mobile surface-to-air missile launchers MANPADS; Anti-aircraft artillery	60; 286 +1,068
Anti-tank guided missile launchers Recoilless rifles	2,685; 71,000
Artillery; Self-propelled artillery Mortars; Multiple rocket launchers	740; 72 +(48) +1,248; 56
Assault rifles	350,000 Rk 62, 40,000 Rk 95 Tp and an unknown amount of Rk 56 Tp and Rk 72 & Rk 72 Tp
Fighter aircraft Combat-capable advanced trainer aircraft Helicopters; UAVs; Transport aircraft	62; 65; 25 + 14 (Border Guard); 215; 13

Finland does not have attack helicopters or submarines. Legislation forbids nuclear weapons entirely.

In early March 2012, Finland decided to purchase advanced Joint Air-to-Surface Standoff Missiles (AGM-158 JASSM) from the United States. Other non-USA operators for the JASSM are Australia, Poland and South Korea. The deal also included other sophisticated bombs like glide-bombs AGM-154 Joint Standoff Weapon and JDAM (Joint Direct Attack Munition).

Finland has updated its M270 multiple launch rocket system (MLRS. In Finnish 298 RSRAKH 06) to be able to fire the ATACMS tactical ballistic missile).

=== Uniform ===
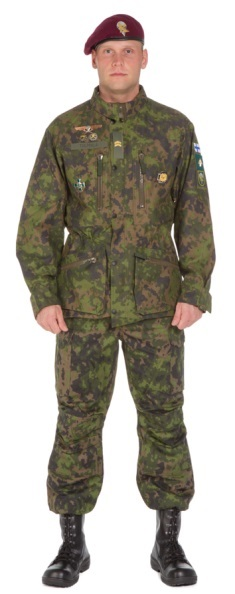
M05 with parachute troops beret

The main field uniform is the M05 uniform, introduced in 2005, which is a green camouflage uniform used by the army. M05 has cold weather and snow camouflage variants, which are gray-green and white with green flecks, respectively. Older green camouflage uniforms are M91 and M62. The M83 light service uniform remains in use as a service uniform for permanent personnel, such as officers and as a dress uniform, but is not commonly issued to troops. This is gray for the army, blue for the air force and dark blue for the navy. The navy has separate naval uniforms, while the air force uses army-pattern uniforms. There are also four separate full dress uniforms depending on the dress code.

== Peacekeeping operations ==
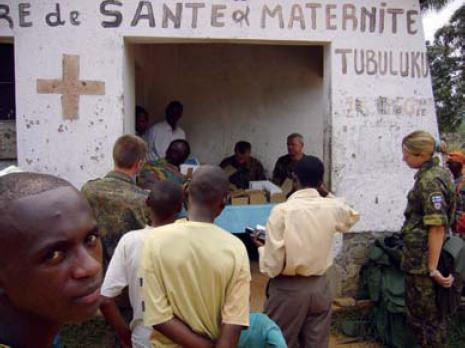
Finnish soldiers at a polling station during operation EUFOR RD Congo in 2006

Finland has taken part in peacekeeping operations since 1956 (the number of Finnish peacekeepers who have served since 1956 amounts to 43,000). In 2003, over a thousand Finnish peacekeepers were involved in peacekeeping operations, including UN and NATO led missions. According to the Finnish law the maximum simultaneous strength of the peacekeeping forces is limited to 2,000 soldiers.

Since 1956, 39 Finnish soldiers have died while serving in peacekeeping operations.

Since 1996, the Pori Brigade has trained parts of the Finnish Rapid Deployment Force (FRDF), which can take part in international crisis management/peacekeeping operations at short notice. The Nyland/Uusimaa Brigade has started training the Amphibious Task Unit (ATU) in recent years, a joint Swedish-Finnish international task unit.

Since 2006, Finland has participated in the formation of European Union Battlegroups. Finland participated in two European Union Battlegroups in 2011.

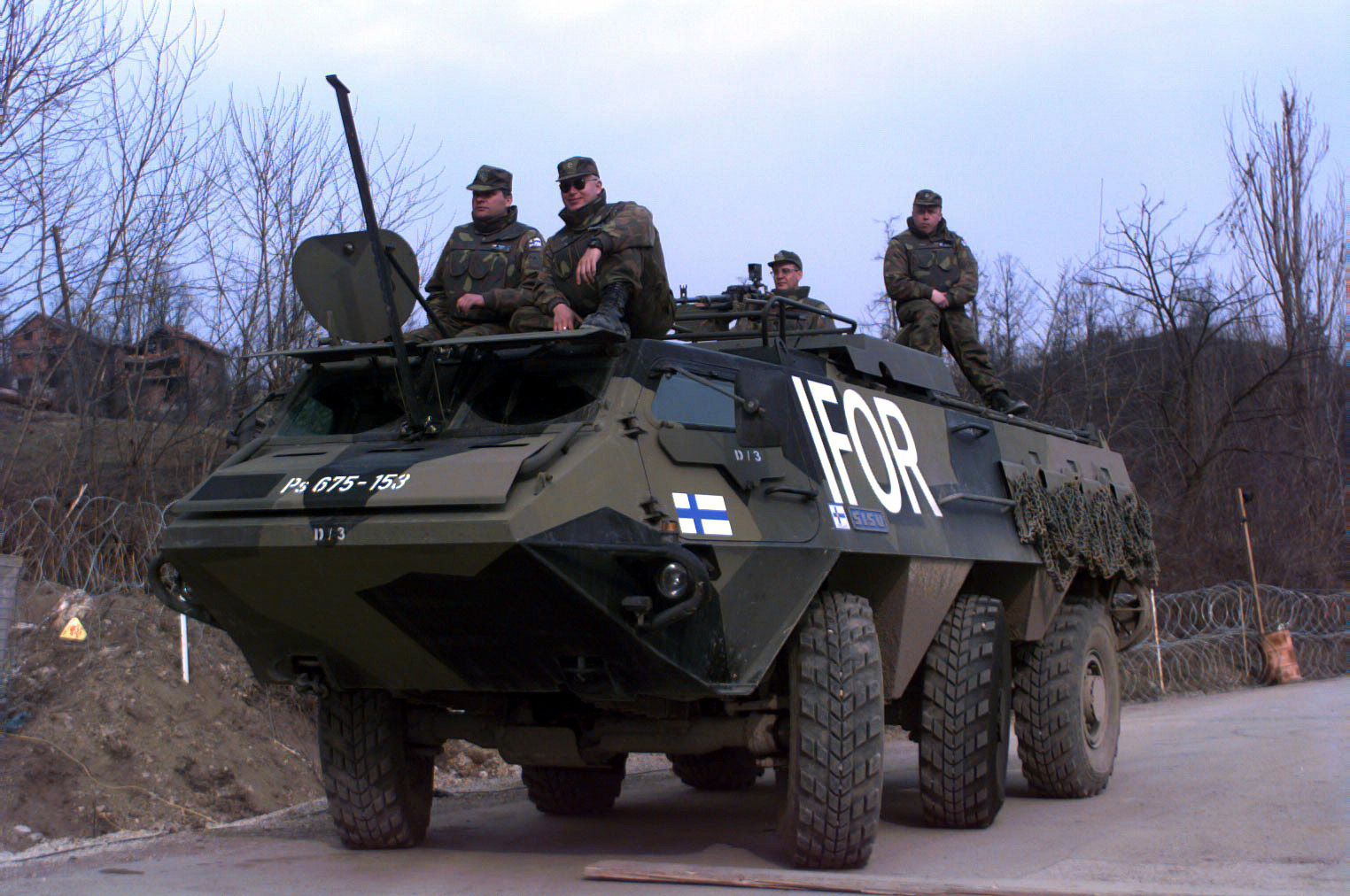
Finnish IFOR troops with their Sisu XA-180 Armored Personnel Carrier

International operations Finland is participating in by deploying military units (personnel strength in parentheses):

- Operation Inherent Resolve in Kurdistan Region (50)
- UNIFIL in Lebanon (350)

Other international operations Finland is participating in with staff personnel, military observers and similar (personnel strength in parentheses):

- EUFOR Althea in Bosnia and Herzegovina (8)
- EUNAVFOR/OPERATION ATALANTA in Gulf of Aden Somalian coast (6)
- European Union Training Mission Somalia (6)
- European Union Training Mission in Mali (11)
- EUNAVFOR MED - OPERATION SOPHIA (8)
- KFOR in Kosovo (20)
- UNTSO (19)
- UNMOGIP in India and Pakistan (6)
- MINUSMA in Mali (5)

== Total defence ==
The Finnish military doctrine is based on the concept of total defence. The term total means that all sectors of the government and economy are involved in the defence planning. In principle, each ministry has the responsibility for planning its operations during a crisis. There are no special emergency authorities, such as the U.S. Federal Emergency Management Agency (FEMA) or Russian Ministry of Emergency Situations. Instead, each authority regularly trains for crises and has been allocated a combination of normal and emergency powers it needs to keep functioning in any conceivable situation. In a war, all resources of society may be diverted to ensure the survival of the nation. The legal basis for such measures is found in the Readiness Act and in the State of Defence Act, which would come into force through a presidential decision verified by parliament in the case of a crisis.

The main objective of the doctrine is to establish and maintain a military force capable of deterring any potential aggressor from using Finnish territory or applying military pressure against Finland. To accomplish this, the defence is organised on the doctrine of territorial defence. The stated main principles of the territorial defence doctrine are

- general conscription,
- territorial defence,
- training of conscripts for wartime units,
- dispersed mobilisation, and
- flexible readiness in responding to military threats of various degree.

The defence planning is organised to counteract three threat situations:

- A regional crisis that may have effects on Finland.
- Political, economic and military pressure, which may include a threat of using military force and its restricted use.
- Use of military force in the form of a strategic strike or an attack beginning with a strategic strike aimed at seizing territory.

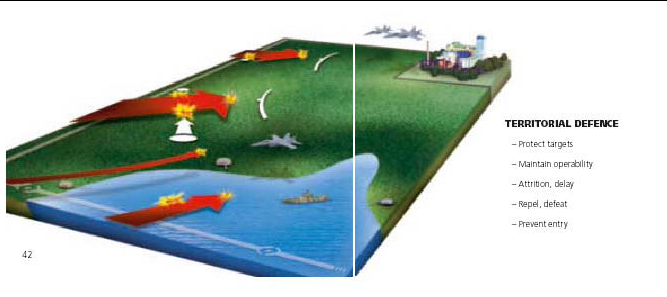
A figure illustrating the principle of territorial defence. The enemy is worn down from the border onwards, and the invasion force is stopped before it captures vital areas. On the sea border, the invasion is stopped on the coast. All services are used jointly to repel the aggressor.

In all cases, the national objective is to keep the vital areas, especially the Helsinki metropolitan area in Finnish possession. In other areas, the size of the country is used to delay and wear down the invader, until the enemy may be defeated in an area of Finnish choosing. The Army carries most of the responsibility for this task.

The key wartime army units in 2015 are:

- 3 Readiness brigades
- 2 Jaeger brigades
- 2 mechanised battle groups
- 6 Infantry brigades (regional)
- 14 independent battalions / battlegroups (regional)
- 28 Territorial Forces (Finland) / company sized (regional)
- Helicopter battalion
- Special Jaeger battalion

The total number of territorial and regional units is undisclosed. The army units are mostly composed of reservists, the career soldiers manning the command and specialty positions.

The role of the Navy is to repel all attacks carried out against Finnish coasts and to safeguard the territorial integrity during peacetime and the "gray" phase of the conflict. The maritime defence relies on the combined use of coastal artillery, missile systems and naval mines to wear down the attacker. The Air Force is used to deny the invader air superiority and to protect most important troops and objects of national importance in conjunction with the ground-based air defence. As the readiness of the Air Force and the Navy is high, even during peacetime, the career personnel have a much more visible role in the wartime duties of these defence branches.

The Border Guard has the responsibility for border security in all situations. During a war, it will contribute to the national defence partially integrated into the army, its total mobilized strength being some 11,600 troops. One of the projected uses for the Border Guard is guerrilla warfare in areas temporarily occupied by enemy.

== Key wartime units ==
The army is organised into operative forces, which consist of approximately 61,000 persons, and territorial forces, which consist of 176,000 persons. The following list is the wartime organisation of the Finnish army from January 2008.

=== Army ===
- 3 readiness brigades
- 2 Jaeger brigades
- 2 Mechanized battlegroups
- 1 Helicopter battalion
- 1 Special jaeger battalion
- 1 Anti-aircraft missile and anti-aircraft unit

Territorial forces:

- 6 infantry brigades (regional)
- 14 independent battalions / battlegroups (regional)
- 28 Territorial Forces (Finland) / company sized (regional)

=== Navy ===
- 2 Battle groups (fleet)
- 3 Battle groups (coastal)
- Battle group (coastal Jaeger)

=== Air Force ===
- 3 fighter squadrons
- 4 Main operating bases

== Gallery ==
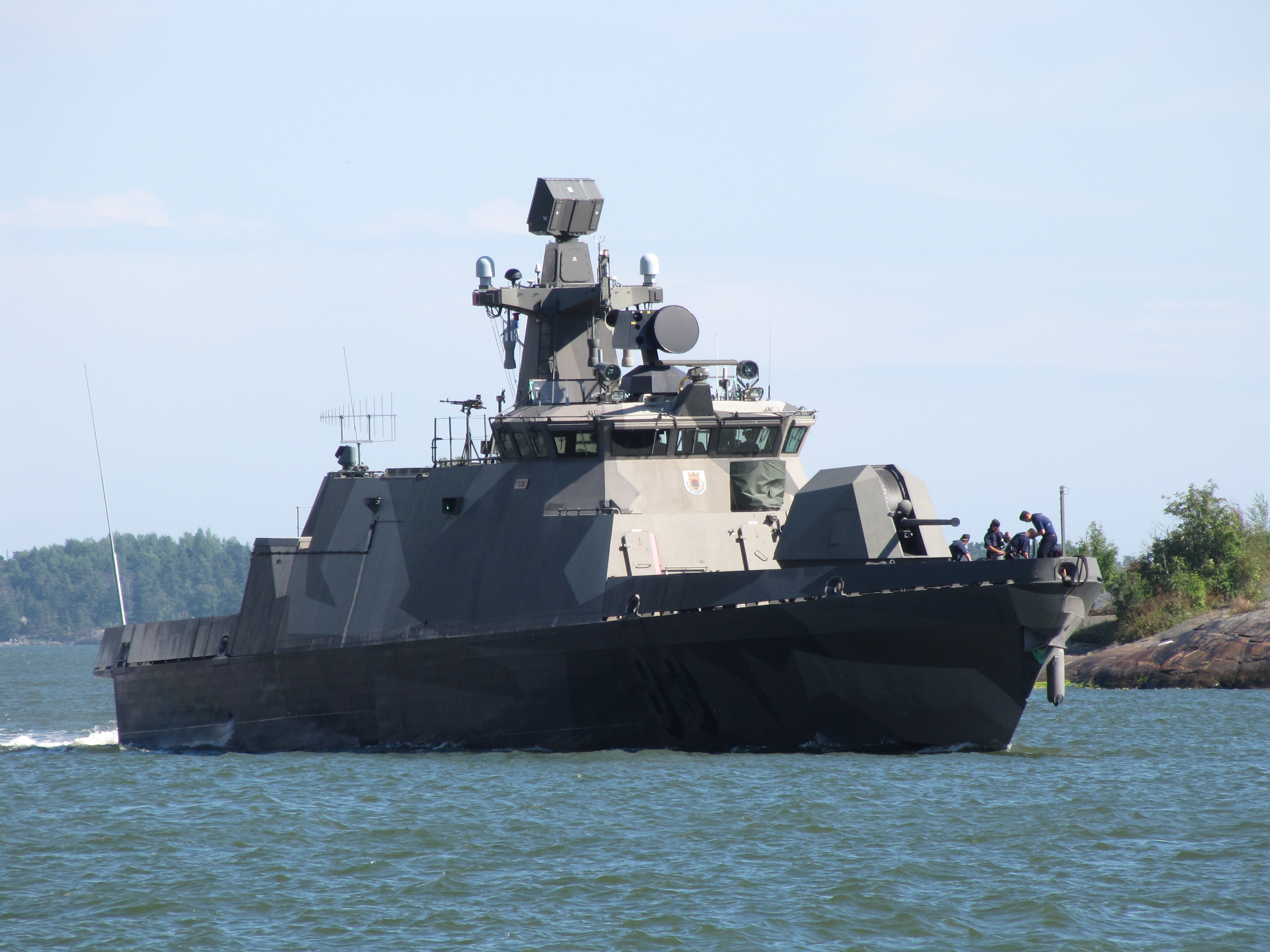
Pori, a Hamina-class fast attack craft of the Finnish Navy

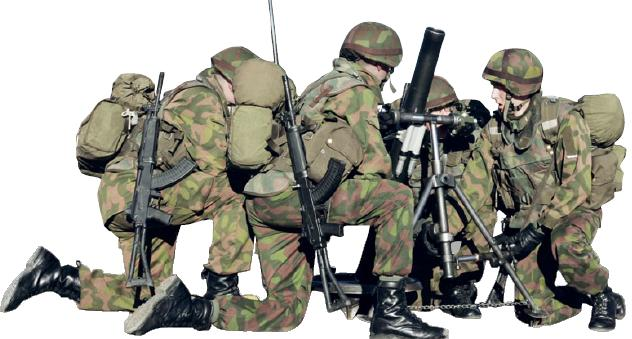
Finnish 81 KRH 71 Y mortar squad equipped with Rk 95 Tp assault rifles

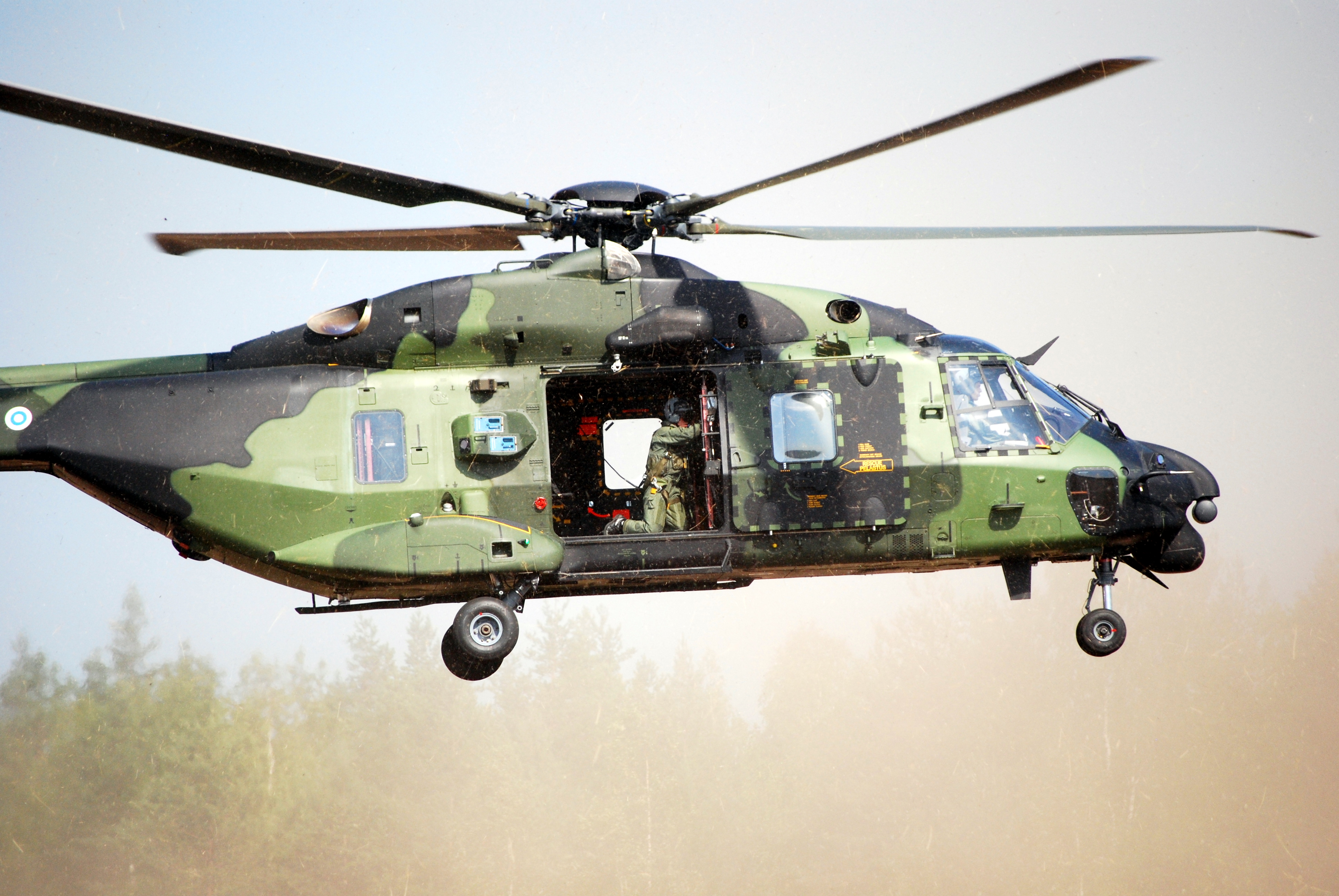
Finnish NH90 in action

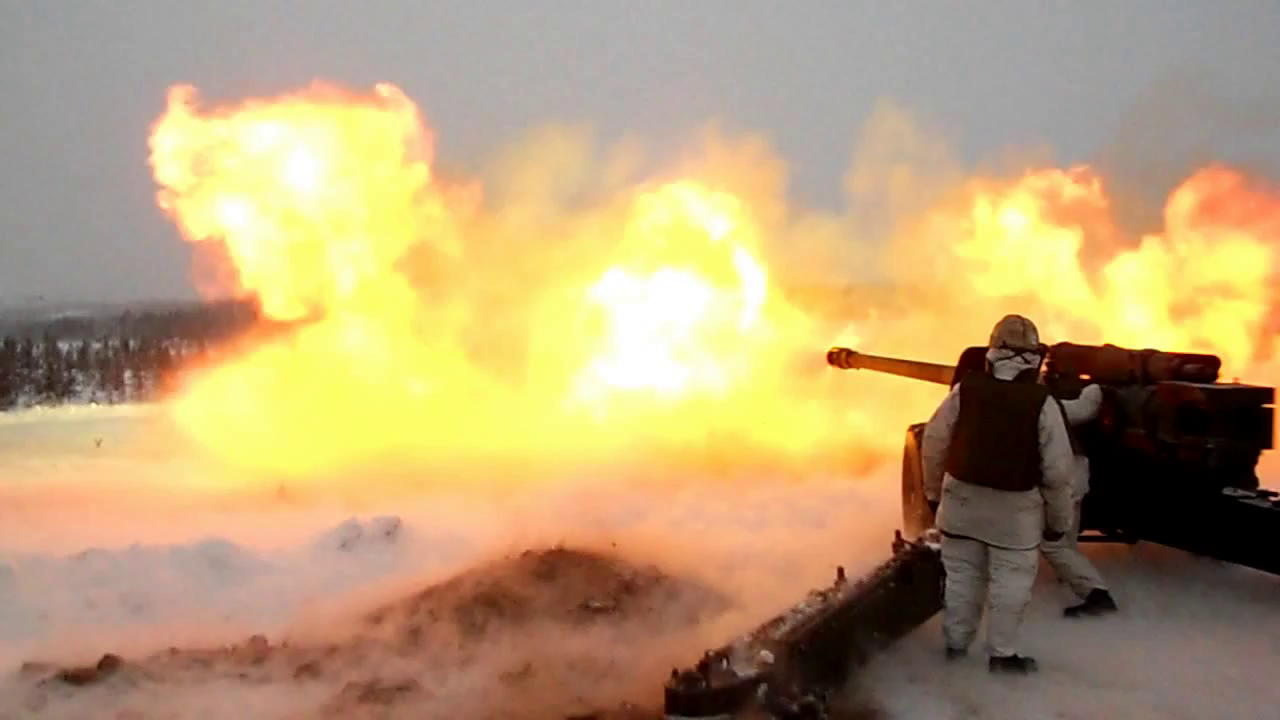
Finnish artillery crew firing an M-46

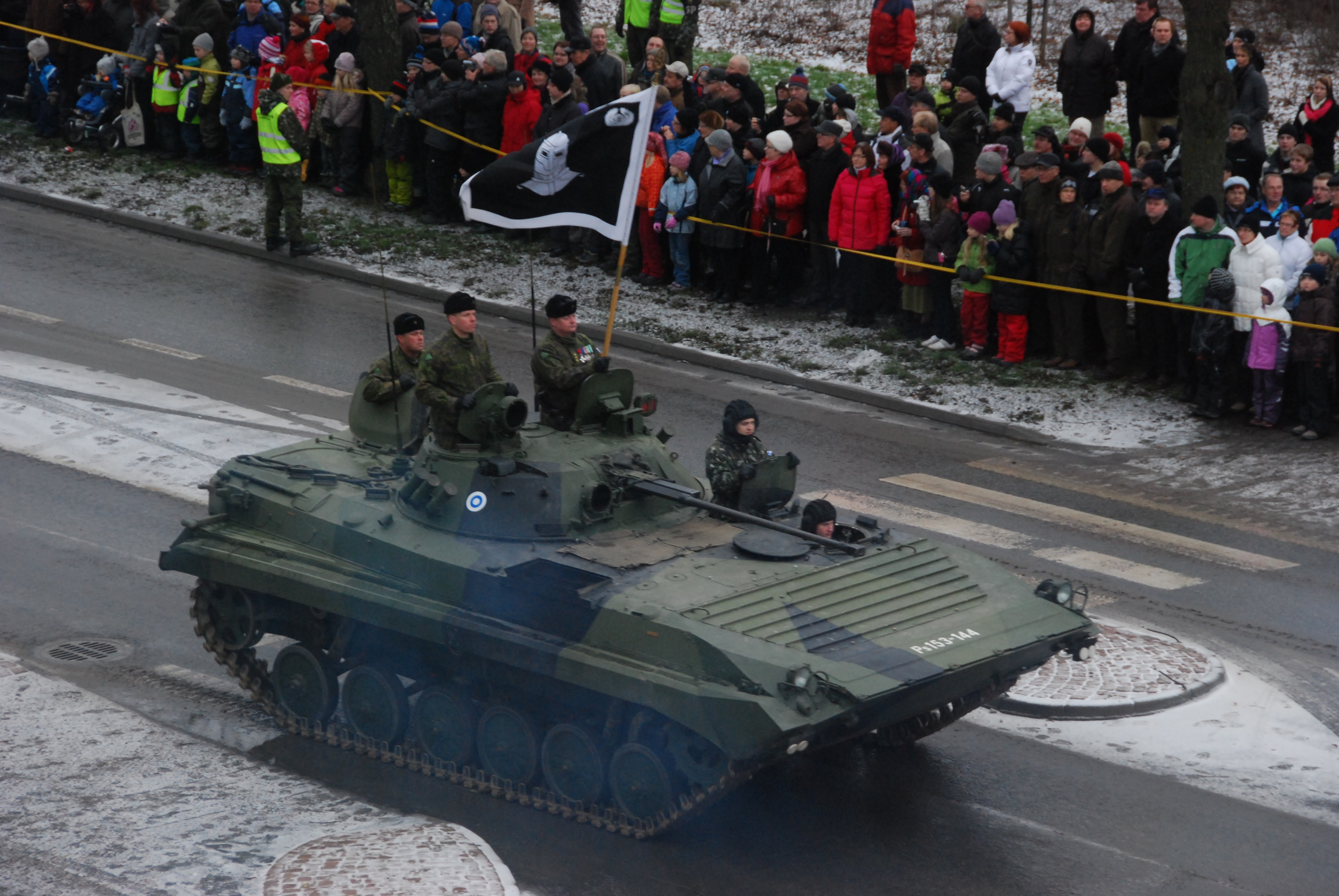
Finnish BMP-2 on parade

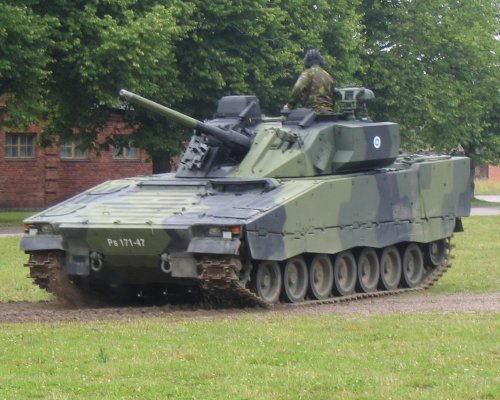
Finnish CV9030FIN Infantry Fighting Vehicle

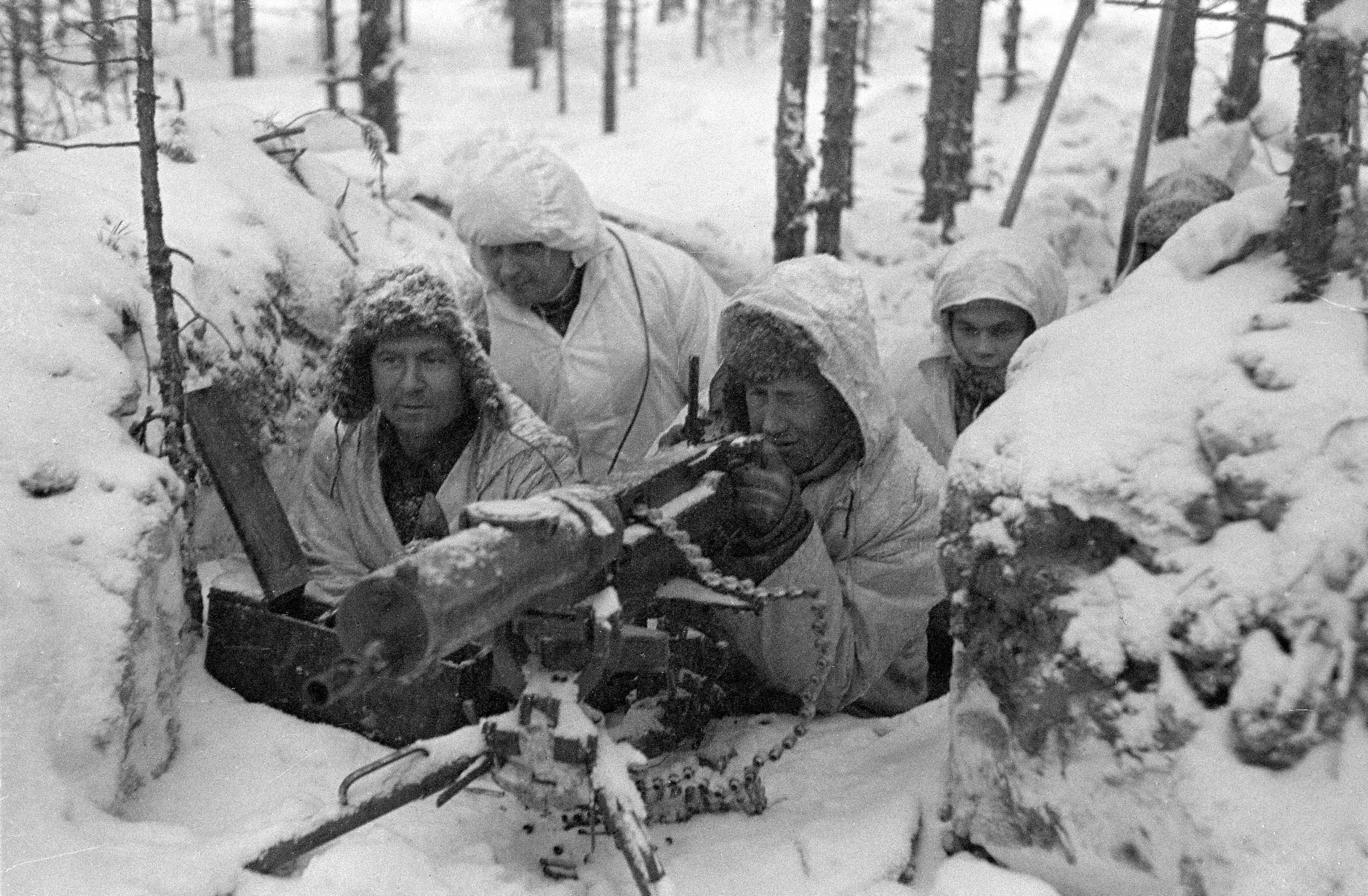
Finnish troops at machine-gun post during the Winter War

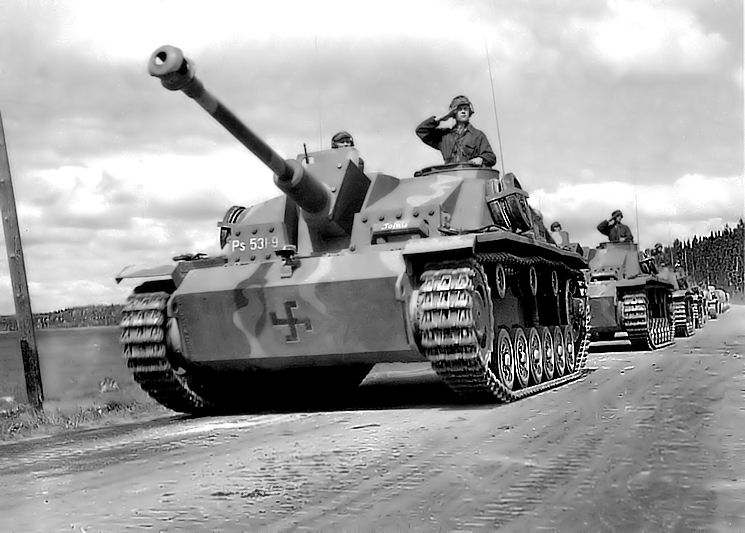
Finnish Sturmgeschütz assault gun during the Continuation War

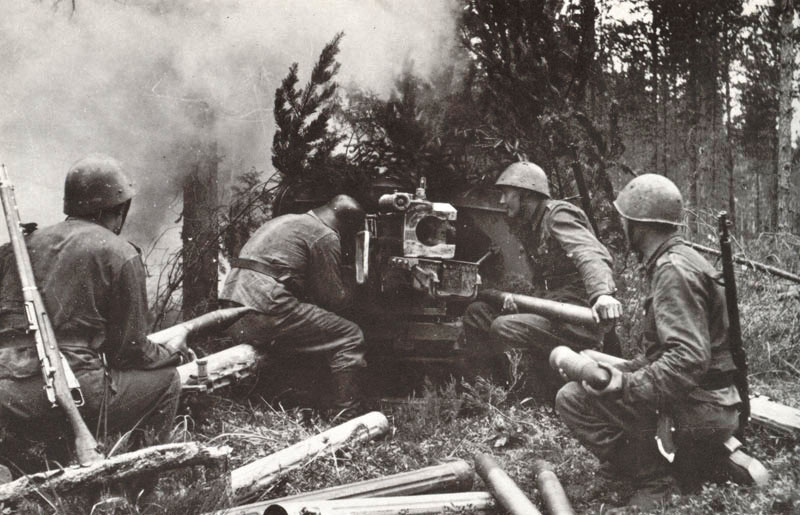
Finnish troops man an antitank gun during the Continuation War

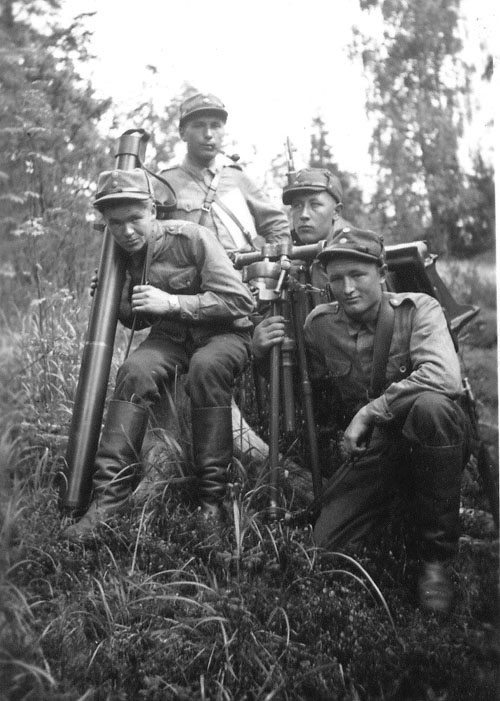
Finnish mortar crew during the Continuation War

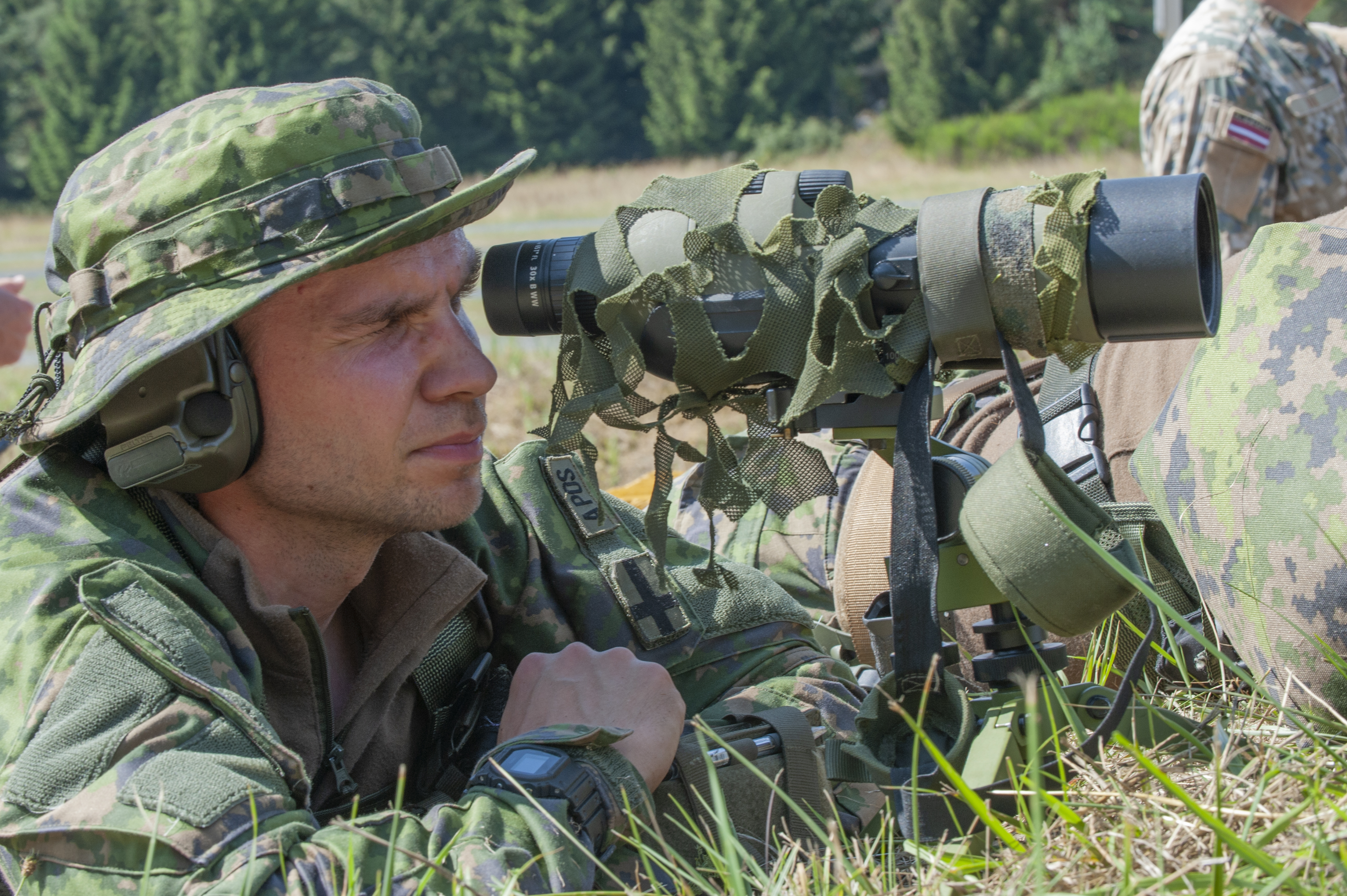
Spotter from a sniper team observing targets

== See also ==
- Finnish Defence Intelligence Agency
- Finnish military ranks
- Finnish Rapid Deployment Force
- Flag Day of the Finnish Defence Forces
- Hybrid warfare
- Military history of Finland during World War II
- Military of the Grand Duchy of Finland
- Nordic Battlegroup
- List of active Finnish Navy ships
- List of equipment of the Finnish Army
- List of military aircraft of Finland
- List of senior officers of the Finnish Defence Forces
- Total defence

== Bibliography ==
- Kronlund, Jarl (project leader) Suomen Puolustuslaitos 1918-1939, Porvoo: WSOY, 1988, ISBN 951-0-14799-0.
