= List of senior officers of the Finnish Defence Forces =

This is a list of senior officers of the Finnish Defence Forces since Finland's independence from Russia in 1917/18.

== Chiefs of Defence ==
- General Carl Gustaf Emil Mannerheim 1918
- Major-General Karl Fredrik Wilkman 1918
- Major-General Vilhelm Aleksander Thesleff 1918
- Colonel Karl Rudolf Walden 1918
- Major-General Karl Fredrik Wilkman 1919
- Major-General Kaarlo Edward Kivekäs 1919
- Major-General Karl Fredrik Wilkama 1919–1924
- Lieutenant General Vilho Petter Nenonen 1924–1925
- Colonel Lauri Malmberg 1925
- Lieutenant General Karl Fredrik Wilkama 1925–1926
- Lieutenant General Aarne Sihvo 22 May 1926 – 13 January 1933
- Lieutenant General Hugo Viktor Österman 1933–1939
- Marshal Carl Gustaf Emil Mannerheim 1939–1944
- General Axel Erik Heinrichs 1944–1945
- Lieutenant General Jarl Frithiof Lundqvist 1945–1946
- General Aarne Sihvo 1946–1953
- General Kaarlo Aleksander Heiskanen 1953–1959
- General Jaakko Sakari Simelius 1959–1965
- General Yrjö Ilmari Keinonen 1965–1969
- General Kaarlo Olavi Leinonen 1969–1974
- General Lauri Sutela 1974–1983
- General Jaakko Valtanen 1983–1990
- Admiral Jan Klenberg 1990–1994
- General Gustav Hägglund 1994–2001
- Admiral Juhani Kaskeala 2001–2009
- General Ari Puheloinen 2009–2014
- General Jarmo Lindberg 2014–2019
- General Timo Kivinen 2019–

== Other ==
- General Adolf Ehrnrooth 1905–2004
