= List of commanders of the Grand Cross of the Order of the White Rose of Finland =

This is a list of commanders of the Grand Cross of the Order of the White Rose of Finland. Living Commanders are in bold and foreign Commanders are on blue background.

The Grand Cross can be awarded with a Collar.

Year of appointment	Commander	Role	Lived	Notes
1919	(Sweden) Gustaf V	King of Sweden (1907–1950)	1858–1950	with Collar
1919	(Denmark) Christian X	King of Denmark (1912–1947)	1870–1947	with Collar
1919	(Finland) Carl Gustaf Emil Mannerheim	Regent of Finland (1918–1919); Commander-in-Chief of the Finnish Defence Forces (1918, 1939–1946); President of Finland (1944–1946)	1867–1951	with Collar with Collar, Swords and Diamonds from 1944
1919	(Finland) Kaarlo Castrén	Prime Minister of Finland (1919)	1860–1938	
1919	(Finland) Lauri Ingman	Prime Minister of Finland (1918–1919); Archbishop of Turku (1930–1934)	1868–1934	
1919	(Finland) Gustaf Johansson	Archbishop of Turku (1899–1930)	1844–1930	
1919	(Finland) August Nybergh	President of the Supreme Court of Finland (1918–1920)	1851–1920	
1919	(Finland) Kaarlo Juho Ståhlberg	President of the Supreme Administrative Court of Finland (1918–1919); President of Finland (1919–1925)	1865–1952	with Collar from later 1919
1919	(Finland) Johan Richard Danielson-Kalmari	statesman	1853–1933	
1919	(Finland) Thiodolf Rein	professor, statesman	1838–1919	
1919	(Finland) Rabbe Axel Wrede	professor	1851–1938	
1920	(Finland) Otto Stenroth	Governor of the Bank of Finland (1918–1923); Chancellor of the Order (1919–1938)	1861–1939	
1920	(France) Paul Deschanel	President of France (1920)	1855–1922	with Collar
1920	(France) Raymond Poincaré	former president of France (1913–1920)	1860–1934	with Collar
1920	(Italy) Victor Emmanuel III	King of Italy (1900–1946)	1869–1947	with Collar
1920	(Finland) Robert Hermanson	professor	1846–1928	
1920	(Finland) Julius Grotenfelt	President of the Supreme Court of Finland (1920–1929)	1859–1929	
1920	(Finland) Juho Kusti Paasikivi	banker Prime Minister of Finland (1918, 1944–1946); President of Finland (1946–1956)	1870–1956	with Collar from 1946
1920	(Finland) Hugo Rautapää	President of the Supreme Administrative Court of Finland (1919–1922)	1874–1922	
1920	(Finland) Juho Vennola	Prime Minister of Finland (1919–1920, 1921–1922)	1872–1938	
1920	(Finland) Karl Fredrik Wilkama	Chief of Defence of the Finnish Defence Forces (1918, 1919, 1919–1924)	1876–1947	
1921	(Finland) Carl Enckell	politician, diplomat	1876–1959	
1921	(Finland) Rafael Erich	former prime minister of Finland (1920–1921)	1879–1946	
1923	(Estonia) Johan Laidoner	Estonian general and statesman.	1884–1953	
1924	(Finland) Aimo Cajander	Prime Minister of Finland (1922, 1924, 1937–1939)	1879–1943	
1924	(Finland) Anders Donner	professor	1854–1938	
1925	(Finland) Lauri Kristian Relander	President of Finland (1925–1931)	1883–1942	with Collar
1925	(Sweden) Gustaf Adolf (later Gustaf VI Adolf)	Crown Prince of Sweden (1907–1950); King of Sweden (1950–1973)	1882–1973	with Collar
1925	(Finland) Jean Sibelius	composer	1865–1957	
1925	(Finland) Ossian Donner	industrialist, diplomat	1866–1957	
1925	(Finland) Antti Tulenheimo	Prime Minister of Finland (1925); Chancellor of the Order (1942–1952)	1879–1952	
1926	(Latvia) Jānis Čakste	President of Latvia (1918–1927)	1859–1927	with Collar
1926	(Norway) Haakon VII	King of Norway (1905–1957)	1872–1957	with Collar
1926	(Norway) Olav (later Olav V)	Crown Prince of Norway (1905–1957); King of Norway (1957–1991)	1903–1991	with Collar
1926	(Denmark) Frederik (later Frederik IX)	Crown Prince of Denmark (1912–1947); King of Denmark (1947–1972)	1899–1972	with Collar
1926	(Finland) Eemil Nestor Setälä	statesman	1864–1935	
1927	(Finland) Pehr Evind Svinhufvud	former Regent of Finland (1918); Prime Minister of Finland (1917–1918, 1930–1931); President of Finland (1931–1937)	1861–1944	with Collar
1928	(Finland) Hugo Suolahti	professor, politician	1874–1944	
1928	(Finland) Axel Fredrik Charpentier	former Chancellor of Justice of Finland (1918–1928)	1865–1949	
1928	(Finland) Werner Söderhjelm	professor, diplomat	1859–1931	
1929	(Finland) August Ramsay	former Governor of the Bank of Finland (1923–1924)	1859–1943	
1929	(Finland) Juho Sunila	Prime Minister of Finland (1927–1928, 1931–1932)	1875–1936	
1929	(Finland) Hannes Gebhard	professor	1864–1933	
1929	(Finland) Oskari Mantere	former prime minister of Finland (1928–1929); Chancellor of the Order (1938–1942)	1874–1942	
1929	(Finland) Hjalmar J. Procopé	politician	1889–1954	
1930	(Czechoslovakia) Tomáš Garrigue Masaryk	President of Czechoslovakia (1918–1935)	1850–1937	with Collar
1930	(Poland) Ignacy Mościcki	President of Poland (1926–1939)	1867–1946	with Collar
1931	(Belgium) Albert I	King of the Belgians (1909–1934)	1875–1934	with Collar
1931	(Netherlands) Henry	Prince of the Netherlands, Consort to the Queen (1901–1934)	1876–1934	with Collar
1931	(Hungary) Miklós Horthy	Regent of Hungary (1920–1944)	1868–1957	with Collar
1932	(Latvia) Alberts Kviesis	President of Latvia (1930–1936)	1881–1944	with Collar
1932	(Lithuania) Antanas Smetona	President of Lithuania (1926–1940)	1874–1944	with Collar
1932	(Netherlands) Wilhelmina	Queen of the Netherlands (1890–1948)	1880–1962	with Collar
1933	(Finland) Lars Karl Krogius	businessman	1860–1935	
1935	(Egypt) Fuad I	King of Egypt (1922–1936)	1868–1936	with Collar
1935	(Finland) Hugo Magnus Johannes Relander	politician	1865–1947	
1935	(United Kingdom) Shaul Tchernichovsky	poet	1875–1943	
1935	(Finland) Frans Pehkonen	President of the Supreme Court of Finland (1929–1940)	1870–1957	
1935	(Finland) Toivo Mikael Kivimäki	Prime Minister of Finland (1932–1936)	1886–1968	
1936	(Finland) Erkki Kaila	Archbishop of Turku (1935–1944)	1867–1944	
1936	(Finland) Risto Ryti	Governor of the Bank of Finland (1923–1940, 1944–1945); Prime Minister of Finland (1939–1940); President of Finland (1940–1944)	1889–1956	with Collar from 1940
1937	(Finland) Hannes Ignatius	military leader	1871–1941	
1937	(Finland) Aarne Sihvo	Chief of Defence of the Finnish Defence Forces (1926–1933, 1946–1953)	1889–1963	
1937	(Finland) Rudolf Walden	military leader	1878–1946	
1937	(Finland) Martin Wetzer	military leader	1868–1954	
1937	(Finland) Kyösti Kallio	President of Finland (1937–1940)	1873–1940	with Collar
1937	(Finland) Jalmar Castrén	professor, politician, public servant	1873–1946	
1937	(Estonia) Konstantin Päts	Head of State of Estonia (1921–1922, 1923–1924, 1931–1932, 1932–1933, 1933–1940)	1874–1956	with Collar
1937	(Brazil) Getúlio Vargas	President of Brazil (1930–1945, 1951–1954)	1882–1954	with Collar
1937	(Finland) Leonard Hjelmman	professor	1869–1952	
1937	(Finland) Gustaf Komppa	professor	1867–1949	
1938	(Finland) Paul von Gerich	military leader	1873–1951	
1938	(Finland) Amos Anderson	newspaper proprietor	1878–1961	
1940	(Finland) Yrjö Hirn	professor	1870–1952	
1940	(Finland) Ernst Lindelöf	professor	1870–1946	
1940	(Uruguay) Alfredo Baldomir	President of Uruguay (1938–1943)	1884–1948	with Collar
1940	(Argentina) Roberto María Ortiz	President of Argentina (1938–1942)	1886–1942	with Collar
1940	(Finland) Urho Castrén	President of the Supreme Administrative Court of Finland (1929–1956); Prime Minister of Finland (1944)	1886–1965	
1940	(Finland) Hjalmar Neovius	President of the Supreme Court of Finland (1940–1945)	1877–1960	
1941	(Nazi Germany) Hermann Göring	politician, military leader	1893–1946	with Collar
1942	(Nazi Germany) Joachim von Ribbentrop	politician	1893–1946	with Collar
1942	(Romania) Michael I	King of Romania (1927–1930, 1940–1947)	1921–2017	with Collar
1942	(Finland) Eero Yrjö Pehkonen	politician	1882–1949	
1942	(Japan) Hirohito	Emperor of Japan (1926–1989)	1901–1989	with Collar
1942	(Finland) Mauri Honkajuuri	banker	1882–1948	
1942	(Finland) Johan Wilhelm Rangell	Prime Minister of Finland (1941–1943)	1894–1982	
1942	(Finland) Alexander Frey	politician, banker	1877–1945	
1943	(Finland) Antti Hackzell	former minister, Prime Minister of Finland (1944)	1881–1946	
1944	(Finland) Edwin Linkomies	former prime minister of Finland (1943–1944)	1894–1963	
1944	(Finland) Henrik Ramsay	politician	1886–1951	
1946	(Finland) Aleksi Lehtonen	Archbishop of Turku (1945–1951)	1891–1951	
1946	(Finland) Oskar Möller	President of the Supreme Court of Finland (1945–1950)	1880–1971	
1951	(Finland) Ilmari Salomies	Archbishop of Turku (1951–1964)	1893–1973	
1951	(Finland) Toivo Tarjanne	President of the Supreme Court of Finland (1950–1963); Chancellor of the Order (1963–?)	1893–1988	
1953	(Finland) Urho Kekkonen	Prime Minister of Finland (1950–1953, 1954–1956); President of Finland (1956–1982)	1900–1986	with Collar from 1956
1954	(Iceland) Ásgeir Ásgeirsson	President of Iceland (1952–1968)	1894–1972	with Collar
1954	(Belgium) Baudouin	King of the Belgians (1951–1993)	1930–1993	with Collar
1954	(Finland) Ralf Törngren	former prime minister of Finland (1954)	1899–1961	
1955	(Finland) Sakari Tuomioja	former prime minister of Finland (1953–1954)	1911–1964	
1955	(Soviet Union) Kliment Voroshilov	Chairman of the Presidium of the Supreme Soviet of the Soviet Union (1953–1960)	1881–1969	with Collar
1955	(Finland) Karl-August Fagerholm	Speaker of the Parliament of Finland (1945–1947, 1950–1956, 1957, 1958–1961, 1965); Prime Minister of Finland (1948–1950, 1956–1957, 1958–1959)	1901–1984	
1956	(Sweden) Louise	Queen consort of Sweden (1950–1965)	1889–1965	with Collar
1957	(Denmark) Ingrid	Queen consort of Denmark (1947–1972)	1910–2000	with Collar
1957	(Finland) Vieno Johannes Sukselainen	Prime Minister of Finland (1957, 1959–1961)	1906–1995	
1958	(Denmark) **Margrethe** (now Margrethe II)	Princess of Denmark (until 1972); Heir presumptive to the Danish throne (1953–1972); Queen of Denmark (1972–2024)	born 1940	with Collar
1958	(Finland) Rainer von Fieandt	former prime minister of Finland (1957–1958)	1890–1972	
1959	(Finland) Georg Achates Gripenberg	diplomat	1890–1975	
1959	(Finland) Reino Kuuskoski	President of the Supreme Administrative Court of Finland (1958–1965) former prime minister of Finland (1958)	1907–1965	
1959	(Finland) Pekka Myrberg	professor	1892–1976	
1960	(Austria) Adolf Schärf	President of Austria (1957–1965)	1890–1965	with Collar
1960	(Italy) Giovanni Gronchi	President of Italy (1955–1962)	1887–1978	with Collar
1961	(Norway) **Harald** (now Harald V)	Crown Prince of Norway (1957–1991); King of Norway (1991–2026)	1937-2026	with Collar
1961	(United Kingdom) Elizabeth II	Queen of the United Kingdom and the other Commonwealth realms (1952–2022)	1926–2022	with Collar
1961	(Finland) Eero Rydman	politician, Chancellor of the Order (1953–1963)	1889–1963	
1962	(Finland) Kauno Kleemola	Speaker of the Parliament of Finland (1962–1965)	1906–1965	
1962	(Finland) Martti Miettunen	Prime Minister of Finland (1961–1962, 1975–1977)	1907–2002	
1962	(France) Charles de Gaulle	President of France (1959–1969)	1890–1970	with Collar
1963	(Socialist Federal Republic of Yugoslavia) Josip Broz Tito	President of Yugoslavia (1953–1980)	1892–1980	with Collar
1963	(Tunisia) Habib Bourguiba	President of Tunisia (1957–1987)	1903–2000	with Collar
1963	(Tanganyika (1961–1964)) Julius Nyerere	President of Tanganyika (1962–1964); President of Tanzania (1964–1985)	1922–1999	with Collar
1964	(Mexico) Adolfo López Mateos	President of Mexico (1958–1964)	1909–1969	with Collar
1964	(Poland) Aleksander Zawadzki	Chairman of the Council of State of Poland (1952–1964)	1899–1964	with Collar
1964	(Finland) Ahti Karjalainen	Prime Minister of Finland (1962–1963, 1970–1971)	1923–1990	
1964	(Finland) Reino Ragnar Lehto	former prime minister of Finland (1963–1964)	1898–1966	
1964	(Finland) Matti Piipponen	former president of the Supreme Court of Finland (1963–1964)	1894–1980	
1965	(India) Sarvepalli Radhakrishnan	President of India (1962–1967)	1888–1975	with Collar
1965	(Poland) Edward Ochab	Chairman of the Council of State of Poland (1964–1968)	1906–1989	with Collar
1965	(Finland) Antti Hannikainen	President of the Supreme Court of Finland (1964–1975)	1910–1976	
1965	(Finland) Sakari Simelius	former Chief of Defence of the Finnish Defence Forces (1959–1965)	1900–1985	
1966	(Finland) Aarne Nuorvala	President of the Supreme Administrative Court of Finland (1965–1982)	1912–2013	
1966	(Finland) Martti Simojoki	Archbishop of Turku (1964–1978)	1908–1999	
1966	(Finland) Johannes Virolainen	Speaker of the Parliament of Finland (1966–1968, 1979–1982) former prime minister of Finland (1964–1966)	1914–2000	
1967	(Egypt) Gamal Abdel Nasser	President of Egypt (1956–1970)	1918–1970	with Collar
1968	(Bulgaria) Georgi Traykov	Chairman of the Presidium of the National Assembly of Bulgaria (1964–1971)	1898–1975	with Collar
1969	(Czechoslovakia) Ludvík Svoboda	President of Czechoslovakia (1968–1975)	1895–1979	with Collar
1969	(Romania) Nicolae Ceaușescu	Head of State of Romania (1967–1989)	1918–1989	with Collar
1969	(Hungary) Pál Losonczi	Chairman of the Presidential Council of Hungary (1967–1987)	1919–2005	with Collar
1969	(Soviet Union) Nikolai Podgorny	Chairman of the Presidium of the Supreme Soviet of the Soviet Union (1965–1977)	1903–1983	with Collar
1970	(Iran) Mohammed Reza Pahlavi	Shah of Iran (1941–1979)	1919–1980	with Collar
1970	(Iran) **Farah Pahlavi**	Consort to the Shah of Iran (1959–1979)	born 1933	with Collar
1970	(Finland) Mauno Koivisto	Governor of the Bank of Finland (1968–1982); Prime Minister of Finland (1968–1970, 1979–1982); President of Finland (1982–1994)	1923–2017	with Collar from 1982
1970	(Finland) Rafael Paasio	Speaker of the Parliament of Finland (1966, 1970–1972); Prime Minister of Finland (1966–1968, 1972)	1903–1980	
1971	(Italy) Giuseppe Saragat	President of Italy (1964–1971)	1898–1988	with Collar
1971	(Turkey) Cevdet Sunay	President of Turkey (1966–1973)	1899–1982	with Collar
1972	(Iceland) Kristján Eldjárn	President of Iceland (1968–1980)	1916–1982	with Collar
1972	(Austria) Franz Jonas	President of Austria (1965–1974)	1899–1974	with Collar
1972	(Netherlands) Juliana	Queen of the Netherlands (1948–1980)	1909–2004	with Collar
1972	(Netherlands) Bernhard	Prince of the Netherlands, Consort to the Queen (1948–1980)	1911–2004	with Collar
1972	(Finland) Teuvo Aura	former prime minister of Finland (1970, 1971–1972)	1912–1999	
1973	(Senegal) Léopold Sédar Senghor	President of Senegal (1960–1980)	1906–2001	with Collar
1973	(Denmark) Henrik	Consort to the Queen of Denmark (1972–2018)	1934–2018	with Collar
1973	(Finland) Erik Serlachius	industrialist	1901–1980	
1974	(East Germany) Willi Stoph	Chairman of the State Council of East Germany (1973–1976)	1914–1999	with Collar
1974	(Sweden) **Carl XVI Gustaf**	King of Sweden (1973–present)	born 1946	with Collar
1975	(Spain) **Juan Carlos** (later Juan Carlos I)	Prince of Spain; King of Spain (1975–2014)	born 1938	with Collar
1975	(Finland) Rolf Nevanlinna	professor	1895–1980	
1976	(Germany) Walter Scheel	President of West Germany (1974–1979)	1919–2016	with Collar
1976	(Soviet Union) Leonid Brezhnev	General Secretary of the Communist Party of the Soviet Union (1964–1982); Chairman of the Presidium of the Supreme Soviet of the Soviet Union (1960–1964, 1977–1982)	1906–1982	with Collar
1977	(Austria) Rudolf Kirchschläger	President of Austria (1974–1986)	1915–2000	with Collar
1977	(Turkey) Fahri Korutürk	President of Turkey (1973–1980)	1903–1987	with Collar
1977	(East Germany) Erich Honecker	Chairman of the State Council of East Germany (1976–1989)	1912–1994	with Collar
1978	(Spain) **Sofía**	Queen consort of Spain (1975–2014)	born 1938	with Collar
1979	(Finland) Uolevi Raade	industrialist	1912–1998	
1979	(Finland) Lauri Sutela	Chief of Defence of the Finnish Defence Forces (1974–1983)	1918–2011	
1980	(France) Valéry Giscard d'Estaing	President of France (1974–1981)	1926–2020	with Collar
1980	(Finland) Armas-Eino Martola	military leader	1896–1986	
1980	(Finland) Curt Olsson	President of the Supreme Court of Finland (1975–1989)	1919–2014	
1982	(Sweden) **Silvia**	Queen consort of Sweden (1976–present)	born 1943	with Collar
1982	(Iceland) **Vigdís Finnbogadóttir**	President of Iceland (1980–1996)	born 1930	with Collar
1982	(Finland) Aksel Airo	military leader	1898–1985	
1982	(Finland) Arvo Ylppö	doctor, professor	1887–1992	
1983	(France) François Mitterrand	President of France (1981–1995)	1916–1996	with Collar
1983	(Finland) Klaus Waris	former Governor of the Bank of Finland (1957–1967)	1914–1994	
1985	(Germany) Richard von Weizsäcker	President of Germany (1984–1994)	1920–2015	with Collar
1985	(Finland) Kalevi Sorsa	Prime Minister of Finland (1972–1975, 1977–1979, 1982–1987)	1930–2004	
1986	(Socialist Federal Republic of Yugoslavia) Radovan Vlajković	President of the Presidency of Yugoslavia (1985–1986)	1924–2001	with Collar
1986	(Japan) **Akihito**	Crown Prince of Japan (1952–1989); Emperor of Japan (1989–2019)	born 1933	with Collar
1986	(Finland) **John Vikström**	Archbishop of Turku (1982–1998)	born 1931	
1987	(Czechoslovakia) Gustáv Husák	President of Czechoslovakia (1975–1989)	1913–1991	with Collar
1987	(Jordan) Hussein	King of Jordan (1952–1999)	1935–1999	with Collar
1987	(Finland) Antti Suviranta	President of the Supreme Administrative Court of Finland (1982–1993)	1923–2008	
1988	(Finland) **Tellervo Koivisto**	Spouse of the President of Finland (1982–1994)	born 1929	
1988	(Finland) Harri Holkeri	Prime Minister of Finland (1987–1991)	1937–2011	
1988	(Finland) Esko Rekola	politician, Chancellor of the Order (1987–1996)	1919–2014	
1989	(Poland) Wojciech Jaruzelski	Head of State of Poland (1985–1990)	1923–2014	with Collar
1989	(Nepal) Birendra	King of Nepal (1972–2001)	1944–2001	with Collar
1989	(Finland) Jaakko Valtanen	Chief of Defence of the Finnish Defence Forces (1983–1990)	1925–2024	
1990	(Netherlands) **Beatrix**	Queen of the Netherlands (1980–2013)	born 1938	with Collar
1990	(Netherlands) Claus	Prince of the Netherlands, Consort to the Queen (1980–2002)	1926–2002	with Collar
1990	(Portugal) Mário Soares	President of Portugal (1986–1996)	1924–2017	with Collar
1991	(Finland) Jan Klenberg	Chief of Defence of the Finnish Defence Forces (1990–1994)	1931–2020	
1992	(Finland) **Esko Aho**	Prime Minister of Finland (1991–1995)	born 1954	
1993	(Luxembourg) Jean	Grand Duke of Luxembourg (1964–2000)	1921–2019	with Collar
1993	(Luxembourg) Joséphine Charlotte	Grand Duchess consort of Luxembourg (1964–2000)	1927–2005	with Collar
1993	(Italy) Oscar Luigi Scalfaro	President of Italy (1992–1999)	1918–2012	with Collar
1993	(Poland) **Lech Wałęsa**	President of Poland (1990–1995)	born 1943	with Collar
1994	(Finland) Martti Ahtisaari	President of Finland (1994–2000)	1937–2023	with Collar
1994	(Finland) **Eeva Ahtisaari**	Spouse of the President of Finland (1994–2000)	born 1936	
1994	(Germany) Roman Herzog	President of Germany (1994–1999)	1934–2017	with Collar
1994	(Finland) Olavi Heinonen	President of the Supreme Court of Finland (1989–2001)	1938–2024	
1995	(Malaysia) Ja'afar of Negeri Sembilan	King of Malaysia (1994–1999)	1922–2008	with Collar
1995	(Hungary) Árpád Göncz	President of Hungary (1990–2000)	1922–2015	with Collar
1995	(Estonia) Lennart Meri	President of Estonia (1992–2001)	1929–2006	with Collar
1995	(Ukraine) **Leonid Kuchma**	President of Ukraine (1994–2005)	born 1938	with Collar
1995	(Finland) **Gustav Hägglund**	Chief of Defence of the Finnish Defence Forces (1994–2001)	born 1938	
1996	(Kuwait) Jaber Al-Ahmad Al-Sabah	Emir of Kuwait (1977–2006)	1926–2006	with Collar
1996	(United Arab Emirates) Zayed bin Sultan Al Nahyan	President of the United Arab Emirates (1971–2004)	1918–2004	with Collar
1996	(Belgium) **Albert II**	King of the Belgians (1993–2013)	born 1934	with Collar
1996	(Greece) Konstantinos Stephanopoulos	President of Greece (1995–2005)	1926–2016	with Collar
1996	(Finland) **Pekka Hallberg**	President of the Supreme Court of Finland (1993–2012)	born 1944	
1996	(Finland) **Paavo Lipponen**	Prime Minister of Finland (1995–2003)	born 1941	
1997	(Argentina) Carlos Menem	President of Argentina (1989–1999)	1930–2021	with Collar
1997	(Brazil) **Fernando Henrique Cardoso**	President of Brazil (1995–2003)	born 1931	with Collar
1997	(Chile) **Eduardo Frei Ruiz-Tagle**	President of Chile (1994–2000)	born 1942	with Collar
1997	(Poland) **Aleksander Kwaśniewski**	President of Poland (1995–2005)	born 1954	with Collar
1997	(South Africa) Nelson Mandela	President of South Africa (1994–1999)	1918–2013	with Collar
1997	(Iceland) **Ólafur Ragnar Grímsson**	President of Iceland (1996–2016)	born 1943	with Collar
1998	(Romania) **Emil Constantinescu**	President of Romania (1996–2000)	born 1939	with Collar
1999	(Mexico) **Ernesto Zedillo**	President of Mexico (1994–2000)	born 1951	with Collar
1999	(France) Jacques Chirac	President of France (1995–2007)	1932–2019	with Collar
1999	(Italy) Carlo Azeglio Ciampi	President of Italy (1999–2006)	1920–2016	with Collar
1999	(Finland) **Jaakko Iloniemi**	diplomat, Chancellor of the Order (1997–2005)	born 1932	
2000	(Finland) **Tarja Halonen**	President of Finland (2000–2012)	born 1943	with Collar
2000	(Finland) **Pentti Arajärvi**	Spouse of the President of Finland (2000–2012)	born 1948	
2001	(Latvia) **Vaira Vīķe-Freiberga**	President of Latvia (1999–2007)	born 1937	with Collar
2001	(Germany) Johannes Rau	President of Germany (1999–2004)	1931–2006	with Collar
2001	(Estonia) **Arnold Rüütel**	President of Estonia (2001–2006)	born 1928	with Collar
2002	(Lithuania) **Valdas Adamkus**	President of Lithuania (1998–2003, 2004–2009)	born 1926	with Collar
2002	(Chile) **Ricardo Lagos**	President of Chile (2000–2006)	born 1938	with Collar
2002	(Hungary) Ferenc Mádl	President of Hungary (2000–2005)	1931–2011	with Collar
2002	(Portugal) Jorge Sampaio	President of Portugal (1996–2006)	1939–2021	with Collar
2002	(Finland) **Juhani Kaskeala**	Chief of Defence of the Finnish Defence Forces (2001–2009)	born 1946	
2002	(Finland) **Riitta Uosukainen**	Speaker of the Parliament of Finland (1994, 1995–1998, 1999–2003)	born 1942	
2003	(Finland) **Leif Sevón**	President of the Supreme Court of Finland (2001–2005)	born 1941	
2004	(Nicaragua) Enrique Bolaños	President of Nicaragua (2002–2007)	1928–2021	with Collar
2004	(Finland) **Matti Vanhanen**	Prime Minister of Finland (2003–2010)	born 1955	
2006	(Hungary) László Sólyom	President of Hungary (2005–2010)	1942–2023	with Collar
2006	(Austria) **Heinz Fischer**	President of Austria (2004–2016)	born 1938	with Collar
2006	(Ukraine) **Viktor Yushchenko**	President of Ukraine (2005–2010)	born 1954	with Collar
2007	(Estonia) **Toomas Hendrik Ilves**	President of Estonia (2006–2016)	born 1953	with Collar
2007	(Qatar) **Hamad bin Khalifa Al Thani**	Emir of Qatar (1995–2013)	born 1952	with Collar
2007	(Germany) **Horst Köhler**	President of Germany (2004–2010)	born 1943	with Collar
2007	(Chile) **Michelle Bachelet**	President of Chile (2006–2010, 2014–2018)	born 1951	with Collar
2007	(Saudi Arabia) Abdullah	King of Saudi Arabia (2005–2015)	1924–2015	with Collar
2007	(Finland) **Aino Sallinen**	professor, Chancellor of the Order (2005–2016)	born 1947	
2008	(Poland) Lech Kaczyński	President of Poland (2005–2010)	1949–2010	with Collar
2008	(Romania) **Traian Băsescu**	President of Romania (2004–2014)	born 1951	with Collar
2008	(Italy) Giorgio Napolitano	President of Italy (2006–2015)	1925–2023	with Collar
2008	(Luxembourg) **Henri**	Grand Duke of Luxembourg (2000–2025)	born 1955	with Collar
2009	(Kazakhstan) **Nursultan Nazarbayev**	President of Kazakhstan (1991–2019)	born 1940	with Collar
2009	(Greece) Karolos Papoulias	President of Greece (2005–2015)	1929–2021	with Collar
2009	(Croatia) **Stjepan Mesić**	President of Croatia (2000–2010)	born 1934	with Collar
2009	(Liberia) **Ellen Johnson Sirleaf**	President of Liberia (2006–2018)	born 1938	with Collar
2009	(Senegal) **Abdoulaye Wade**	President of Senegal (2000–2012)	born 1926	with Collar
2009	(Syria) **Bashar al-Assad**	President of Syria (2000–2024)	born 1965	with Collar
2009	(Finland) **Pauliine Koskelo**	President of the Supreme Court of Finland (2006–2015)	born 1956	
2010	(Slovenia) **Danilo Türk**	President of Slovenia (2007–2012)	born 1952	with Collar
2010	(Latvia) **Valdis Zatlers**	President of Latvia (2007–2011)	born 1955	with Collar
2010	(Benin) **Thomas Boni Yayi**	President of Benin (2006–2016)	born 1951	with Collar
2010	(Jordan) **Abdullah II**	King of Jordan (1999–present)	born 1962	with Collar
2011	(Croatia) **Ivo Josipović**	President of Croatia (2010–2015)	born 1957	with Collar
2011	(Finland) **Ari Puheloinen**	Chief of Defence of the Finnish Defence Forces (2009–2014)	born 1951	
2012	(Finland) **Sauli Niinistö**	President of Finland (2012–2024)	born 1948	with Collar
2012	(Finland) **Jenni Haukio**	Spouse of the President of Finland (2012–2024)	born 1977	
2013	(Lithuania) **Dalia Grybauskaitė**	President of Lithuania (2009–2019)	born 1956	with Collar
2013	(Latvia) **Andris Bērziņš**	President of Latvia (2011–2015)	born 1966	with Collar
2013	(France) **François Hollande**	President of France (2012–2017)	born 1954	with Collar
2013	(Finland) **Jyrki Katainen**	Prime Minister of Finland (2011–2014)	born 1971	
2015	(Poland) **Bronisław Komorowski**	President of Poland (2010–2015)	born 1952	with Collar
2015	(Mexico) **Enrique Peña Nieto**	President of Mexico (2012–2018)	born 1966	with Collar
2016	(Finland) **Jarmo Lindberg**	Chief of Defence of the Finnish Defence Forces (2014–2019)	born 1959	
2016	(Finland) **Juha Sipilä**	Prime Minister of Finland (2015–2019)	born 1961	
2017	(Estonia) **Kersti Kaljulaid**	President of Estonia (2016–2021)	born 1969	with Collar
2017	(Iceland) **Guðni Thorlacius Jóhannesson**	President of Iceland (2016–2024)	born 1968	with Collar
2017	(Italy) **Sergio Mattarella**	President of Italy (2015–present)	born 1941	with Collar
2017	(Poland) **Andrzej Duda**	President of Poland (2015–present)	born 1972	with Collar
2018	(France) **Emmanuel Macron**	President of the French Republic (2017–present)	born 1977	with Collar
2018	(Germany) **Frank-Walter Steinmeier**	President of Germany (2017–present)	born 1956	with Collar
2019	(Finland) **Timo Esko**	President of the Supreme Court of Finland (2016–2019)	born 1952	
2021	(Finland) **Kari Kuusiniemi**	President of the Supreme Administrative Court of Finland (2018–present)	born 1960	
2022	(Sweden) **Victoria**	Crown Princess of Sweden (1980–present)	born 1977	with Collar
2022	(Finland) **Timo Kivinen**	Chief of Defence of the Finnish Defence Forces (2019–2024)	born 1959	
2022	(Finland) **Sanna Marin**	Prime Minister of Finland (2019–2023)	born 1985	
2023	(Finland) **Tatu Leppänen**	President of the Supreme Court of Finland (2019–present)	born 1968	
2024	(Finland) **Alexander Stubb**	President of Finland (2024–present)	born 1968	with Collar
2024	(Finland) **Suzanne Innes-Stubb**	Spouse of the President of Finland (2024–present)	born 1970	
2024	(Estonia) **Alar Karis**	President of Estonia (2021–present)	born 1958	with Collar
2024	(Norway) **Haakon VIII**	King of Norway (2026–present)	born 1973	with Collar
2024	(Finland) **Petteri Orpo**	Prime Minister of Finland (2023–present)	born 1969	
2025	(Finland) **Timo Laitinen**	Chancellor of the Order (2025–present)	born 1958	
2025	(Denmark) **Frederik X**	King of Denmark (2024–present)	born 1968	with Collar
2025	(Ukraine) **Volodymyr Zelenskyy**	President of Ukraine (2019–present)	born 1978	with Collar
2025	(Ukraine) **Olena Zelenska**	Spouse of the President of Ukraine (2019–present)	born 1978	
2025	(Latvia) **Edgars Rinkēvičs**	President of Latvia (2023–present)	born 1973	with Collar
2025	(Iceland) **Halla Tómasdóttir**	President of Iceland (2024–present)	born 1968	with Collar
2025	(Iceland) **Björn Skúlason**	Spouse of the President of Iceland (2024–present)	born 1973	
2025	(Finland) **Jussi Halla-aho**	Speaker of the Parliament of Finland (2023–present)	born 1971	

== Sources ==
- Suomen Valkoisen Ruusun ritarikunnan suurristin ketjuineen ulkomaalaiset saajat (in Finnish)
- Korkeimpien suomalaisten kunniamerkkien haltijat 1918–1969 (in Finnish)
