= Order of the Cross of Liberty =

Finnish honorary chivalry order

Order of the Cross of Liberty: Vapaudenristin ritarikunta; Frihetskorsets orden
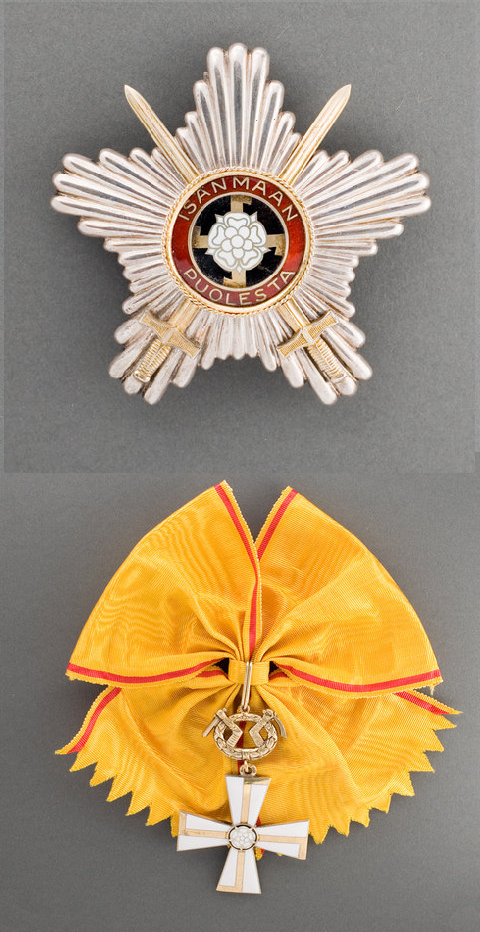
- Grand cross of the Cross of Liberty with swords and a breast star

Awarded by Finland
- Type: State order
- Established: March 4, 1918; 108 years ago
- Country: Finland
- Seat: Defence Command, Helsinki
- Motto: Isänmaan puolesta ('For the Fatherland' or 'Pro Patria')
- Eligibility: Finnish nationals and foreigners, Finnish Defence Force units and other organizations
- Awarded for: military merits and distinguished service to the defense forces.
- Status: Currently constituted
- First head: Carl Gustaf Emil Mannerheim
- Grand Master: Alexander Stubb
- Chancellor: Kenraali Ari Puheloinen
- Vice-Chancellor: Kenraaliluutnantti Sakari Honkamaa
- Classes: Grand Cross; Cross of Liberty, 1st Class; Cross of Liberty, 2nd Class; Cross of Liberty, 3rd Class; Cross of Liberty, 4th Class; Medal of Liberty, 1st Class; Medal of Liberty, 2nd class; Medal of Merit, 1st Class; Medal of Merit, 2nd Class
- Website: vapaudenristinritarikunta.fi/en

Statistics
- First induction: March 12, 1918

Precedence
- Next (higher): Order of the White Rose of Finland
- Next (lower): Order of the Lion of Finland

The Order of the Cross of Liberty (Finnish: Vapaudenristin ritarikunta; Swedish: Frihetskorsets orden) is one of three official state orders in Finland, along with the Order of the White Rose of Finland and the Order of the Lion of Finland.

The awards of the Order of the Cross of Liberty can be granted for both civil and military merits. They are usually conferred on the Flag Day of the Finnish Defence Forces and on Finland's Independence Day but may also be awarded on other occasions as needed.

With the exception of the Mannerheim Cross, the class of an award to be conferred depends on the recipient's military rank or an equivalent civilian status. Crosses of Liberty are primarily awarded to officers, while Medals of Liberty are given to non-commissioned officers and enlisted personnel. The Cross of Liberty is awarded for military merits with swords and for civil merits without swords. To recognize exceptional performance on the front line or leadership during wartime, the Cross of Liberty may be conferred upon a soldier adorned with oak leaves. The Medal of Liberty is awarded to military personnel, while the Cross of Liberty Medal of Merit is granted to civilians. During wartime, the Cross of Liberty with swords or the Medal of Liberty may also be awarded to civilians.

The Mannerheim Cross is also the highest Finnish military award for gallantry and can be awarded in two classes.

== Organisation ==
The President of Finland is the Grand Master of the Order of the White Rose of Finland and of the Order of the Lion of Finland, and usually of the Order of the Cross of Liberty as well, Grand Mastership of which is attached to the position of Commander-in-chief. All of these orders are administered by boards consisting of a chancellor, a vice-chancellor and at least four members. The orders of the White Rose of Finland and the Lion of Finland have a joint board.

== History ==
The Order of the Cross of Liberty was founded on March 4, 1918, upon the initiative of Regent of Finland Carl Gustaf Emil Mannerheim. He had commissioned the artist Akseli Gallen-Kallela to design awards and other insignia for the White Army towards the end of February 1918.

The designs by Gallen-Kallela were confirmed by the Finnish Senate at the foundation of the order in seven classes: grand cross, cross of liberty (1st to 4th Class) and the medal of liberty (1st and 2nd Class). Since the Order of the Cross of Liberty was initially established to reward wartime merits, Regent Mannerheim decided to cease awarding these decorations on the first anniversary of the Finnish Civil War's outbreak, January 28, 1919 and the order was in essence defunct from that day on.

The outbreak of war in 1939 between Finland and the Soviet Union highlighted the need to reward soldiers and civilians during wartime. Immediately after the beginning of the Winter War, Mannerheim, who had been appointed Commander-in-Chief of the Finnish Defense Forces, initiated the reinstatement of the Cross of Liberty and the Medals of Liberty. President Kyösti Kallio issued a decree on December 8, 1939, concerning the awarding of the Crosses and Medals of Liberty. This decree largely followed the provisions established earlier in 1918. The most significant change was that the President authorized the Commander-in-Chief to confer all Crosses and Medals of Liberty. The Order of Cross of Liberty was made a permanent order on 16 December 1940.

A decree issued on 18 August 1944 enabled the decorations to be awarded in peacetime. In the same decree, Mannerheim (1867–1951) was designated as Grand Master for life, after which the title would move to the serving Commander-in-Chief of the Finnish Defence Forces.

Decorations of the order were awarded in great numbers during the World War II, partly due to Marshal Mannerheim having issued an order that wounded soldiers were to be awarded for their sacrifice, and Finland has no separate decoration for wounded. The Cross of Liberty is usually reserved for commissioned officers, with the Medal of Liberty being awarded for soldiers of junior rank and NCOs.

The Cross of Liberty has a red ribbon when it is granted in wartime and a yellow ribbon when it is awarded in peacetime.

== List of awards of the Order of the Cross of Liberty ==
Grand Cross of the Order of the Cross of Liberty; Vapaudenristin suurristi (VR SR); Frihetskorsets storkors (FrK SK)
Without swords	With swords	Notes		
		The Grand Cross of the Order of the Cross of Liberty is a large white-enamelled medal cross, measuring 53 mm in height and width. At its center is a white-enamelled, gold-edged heraldic rose on a black background, surrounded by a narrow golden ring. A golden swastika is embedded into the arms of the cross. When the decoration is awarded for wartime merits, it is attached to a 102 mm wide red ribbon, which has a 3 mm wide white stripe 2 mm from each edge. When awarded for peacetime merits, it is attached to a yellow ribbon, which has a 3 mm wide red stripe located 2 mm from each edge. The ribbon is worn from the right shoulder to the left hip. The breast star belonging to the Grand Cross is a silver, five-pointed star which is worn on the left side of the chest. The distance from the center to the tips of the radiating rays is 44 mm. At the center is a 33 mm diameter white-enamelled, gold-edged heraldic rose placed over a golden swastika on a black enamel background. This central design is surrounded by a circular golden frame with a red enamel background inscribed in gold letters with the words "ISÄNMAAN PUOLESTA" ("For the Fatherland"). The swords on the breast star are positioned so that their hilts rest on the two downward-facing rays of the star. The central motif covers part of the swords, with their tips re-emerging symmetrically on both sides of the upward-facing ray. The breast star belonging to the Grand Cross awarded without swords is identical to the version with swords, except that it does not include the swords.		
Cross of Liberty, 1st Class with star 1. luokan Vapaudenristi rintatähtineen (VR 1 rtk.); Frihetskorsets 1. klass med kraschan (FrK 1 mkr.)
Without swords	With swords	For gallantry	Notes	
			The Cross of Liberty, 1st Class with star is similar in appearance to the Grand Cross but measures 49 mm in height and width. When awarded for wartime merits, it is worn around the neck on a 41 mm wide red ribbon, which has a 2 mm wide white stripe 1.5 mm from each edge. When awarded for peacetime merits, it is worn on a 41 mm wide yellow ribbon, which has a 2 mm wide red stripe 1.5 mm from each edge. The Cross of Liberty, 1st Class with star without swords is similar to the cross awarded with swords, but the wreath design matches that of the Grand Cross awarded without swords. The breast stars belonging to this decoration are identical in design to the breast stars of the Grand Cross, both with and without swords, but the distance from the center to the tips of the radiating rays is 41 mm, and the diameter of the central part is 29 mm. The breast stars are worn on the left side of the chest. The award for gallantry with oak leaves can only be awarded together with the swords.	
Cross of Liberty, 1st Class; 1. luokan Vapaudenristi )(VR 1); Frihetskorsets 1. klass (FrK 1)
Without swords	With swords	For gallantry	Notes	
			Cross of Liberty, 1st Class, both with and without swords, are identical to those described above but do not include the breast star.	
Cross of Liberty, 2nd Class; 2. luokan Vapaudenristi (VR 2); Frihetskorsets 2. klass (FrK 2)
Without swords	With swords	For gallantry	Notes	
			The Cross of Liberty, 2nd Class with swords is similar in appearance to the Grand Cross with swords but measures 40 mm in height and width. When awarded for wartime merits, it is worn on the chest on a 31 mm wide red ribbon with a rosette, featuring a 1.5 mm wide white stripe 1 mm from each edge. For peacetime merits, it is worn on a 31 mm wide yellow ribbon, which has a 1.5 mm wide red stripe 1 mm from each edge. The Cross of Liberty, 2nd Class without swords is identical to the version with swords but features a wreath design similar to that of the Grand Cross awarded without swords.	
Cross of Liberty, 3rd Class; 3. luokan Vapaudenristi (VR 3); Frihetskorsets 3. klass (FrK 3)
With Red Cross	Without swords	With swords	For gallantry	Notes
				The Cross of Liberty, 3rd Class with swords is the same size as the Cross of Liberty, 2nd Class but is made of black oxidized iron. The heraldic rose in the center, the swastika on the arms of the cross, and the wreath design are gilded silver. For wartime merits, the decoration is worn on the chest with a 31 mm wide red ribbon with a rosette, featuring two 2 mm wide white stripes with a 4.5 mm wide red central stripe between them. For peacetime merits, it is worn on a 31 mm wide yellow ribbon with two 2 mm wide red stripes and a 4.5 mm wide yellow central stripe between them. The Cross of Liberty, 3rd Class without swords is the same size as the version with swords but is made of dark blue enamel and set in gilded silver. The heraldic rose in the center, the swastika on the arms of the cross, and the wreath design matching that of the Grand Cross without swords are gilded silver.
Cross of Liberty, 4th Class; 4. luokan Vapaudenristi (VR 4 / VR 4 ra); Frihetskorsets 4. klass (FrK 4 / FrK 4 fr)
With Red Cross	Without swords	With swords	For gallantry	Notes
				The Cross of Liberty, 4th Class with swords is identical in appearance and size to the Cross of Liberty, 3rd Class with swords . However, the heraldic rose in the center, the swastika on the arms of the cross, and the wreath design are made of silver. The decoration is worn on the chest with the same ribbon as the Cross of Liberty, 3rd Class with swords: a 31 mm wide red ribbon with a rosette, featuring two 2 mm wide white stripes with a 4.5 mm wide red central stripe between them. The Cross of Liberty, 4th Class without swords is identical in appearance to the Cross of Liberty, 3rd Class without swords but is set in silver. The heraldic rose in the center, the swastika on the arms of the cross, and the wreath design matching that of the Grand Cross without swords are made of silver.
Medal of Liberty, 1st Class; 1. luokan Vapaudenmitali (VM 1); Frihetsmedaljens 1. klass (FrM 1)
Peacetime, with Red Cross	Wartime, with Red Cross	Peacetime	Wartime	Notes
				The Medal of Liberty, 1st Class is made of silver and has a diameter of 30 mm. On the obverse side, there is the crowned head of the lion from the Finnish coat of arms and an armored lion's arm wielding a sword, surrounded by the words "Urheudesta" – "För tapperhet" ("For Bravery"), separated by two heraldic roses. On the reverse side, within a laurel wreath, are the words "Suomen kansalta" ("From the People of Finland") and the year marking the start of the war during which the medal was awarded. When the medal is awarded for peacetime merits, it is otherwise identical to the wartime version, but on the obverse, the words "Urheudesta" – "För tapperhet" are replaced with "Isänmaan puolesta" – "För fosterlandet" ("For the Fatherland"). On the reverse side, within the laurel wreath, are the words "Suomen kansalta". The medal is worn on the chest, attached to a 31 mm wide blue ribbon with a 1.5 mm wide white stripe located 2.5 mm from each edge.
Medal of Merit, 1st Class; Vapaudenristin 1. luokan ansiomitali (VR Am 1); Frihetskorsets förtjänstmedalj av 1. klass (FrK Fm 1)
	Notes			
	The Medal of Merit, 1st Class is identical to the 1st Class Medal of Liberty awarded for peacetime merits. It is worn on the chest, attached to a 31 mm wide green ribbon featuring a 7 mm wide black central stripe and a 3 mm wide red stripe located 2 mm from each edge.			
Medal of Liberty, 2nd Class; 2. luokan Vapaudenmitali (VM 2); Frihetsmedaljens 2. klass (FrM 2)
Peacetime, with Red Cross	Wartime, with Red Cross	Peacetime	Wartime	Notes
				The Medal of Liberty, 2nd Class is identical in size and appearance to the Medal of Liberty, 1st Class, but it is made of bronze. The medal is worn on the chest, attached to a 31 mm wide red ribbon with a 4 mm wide yellow stripe located 1 mm from each edge.
Medal of Merit, 2nd Class; Vapaudenristin 2. luokan ansiomitali (VR Am 2); Frihetskorsets förtjänstmedalj av 2. klass (FrK Fm 2)
Civil	Notes			
	The Medal of Merit, 2nd Class is identical to the Medal of Liberty, 2nd Class awarded for peacetime merits but is worn on the same ribbon as the Medal of Merit, 1st Class.			

=== Special awards ===
Mannerheim Cross, 1st Class; Vapaudenristin 1. luokan Mannerheim -risti (MR 1); Frihetskorsets Mannerheimkors av 1. klass (MK 1)
Notes
The Mannerheim Cross, 1st Class is identical in size to the Cross of Liberty, 1st Class with Swords, but apart from the heraldic rose in the center, it is made of black enamel. The decoration is worn around the neck, suspended from the same ribbon as the Cross of Liberty, 1st Class with Swords awarded for wartime merits. The cross bears its unique serial number engraved in gold on the reverse side.
Mannerheim Cross, 2nd Class; Vapaudenristin 2. luokan Mannerheim -risti (MR 2); Frihetskorsets Mannerheimkors av 2. klass (MK 2)
Notes
The Mannerheim Cross, 2nd Class is 46 mm high and wide cross made of black enamel and cast in gold. The center features the heraldic rose of the Cross of Liberty in white enamel, surrounded by a 26 mm wide and 20 mm high golden laurel wreath, with the armored, armed arm from the Coat of Arms of Karelia. The arms of the cross are inset with golden swastikas. The cross is worn on the left side of the chest without a ribbon. The cross bears its unique serial number engraved on the reverse side. The second award of the Mannerheim Cross, 2nd Class is distinguished by a buckle attached above the decoration. This buckle consists of two crossed miniature Marshal's batons, each 31.5 mm long, patinated black. The ferrules of the batons are gilded, and each features seven gilded protrusions shaped like lions. The baton pointing upward to the right is positioned on top.
Medal of Liberty, 1st Class with Rosette; 1. luokan Vapaudenmitali ruusukenauhassa (Vm 1 rnk.); Frihetsmedaljens 1. klass med rosett på bandet (Frm 1 mrb.)
Notes
The Medal of Liberty, 1st Class with Rosette is identical to the Medal of Liberty, 1st Class awarded for wartime merits, except that the ribbon is fitted with a ribbon bow. The Medal of Liberty, 1st Class with Rosette has been awarded only once, to C. G. E. Mannerheim post Winter War.
Medal of Merit in gold of the Order of the Cross of Liberty; Vapaudenristin kultainen ansiomitali (VR kult.Am); Frihetskorsets förtjänstmedalj i guld (FrK Fm g.)
Notes
Medal of Merit in gold is identical to the Medal of Merit, 1st Class, but it is made of gold and is worn on the chest with the same ribbon as the other merit medals. Medal of Merit in gold has been awarded only once, to Waldemar Erfurth on 13th of June, 1944.
Cross of Mourning of the Order of the Cross of Liberty; Vapaudenristin sururisti (VR surur.); Frihetskorsets sorgekors (FrK srk.)
Notes
Cross of Mourning is identical to the Cross of Liberty, 4th Class with Swords, but it is worn on the chest with a 31 mm wide black ribbon, featuring a ribbon bow. Cross of Mourning can be awarded to the next of kin of a fallen member of the Finnish Defence Forces. A female next of kin has the right to wear the Cross of Mourning, with the order of precedence being wife, eldest daughter, and mother. If there are no female next of kin, the cross is awarded to the closest male relative, who does not have the right to wear it.
Medal of Mourning of the Order of the Cross of Liberty; Vapaudenristin surumitali (VR surum.); Frihetskorsets sorgemedalj (FrK srm.)
Notes
Medal of Mourning of the Order of the Cross of Liberty is identical to the Medal of Merit, 1st Class of the Cross of Liberty, but it is worn on the chest with a 31 mm wide black ribbon. The Medal of Mourning is awarded to the next of kin of those who lost their lives in military industry or other work for the defense of the country, under the same conditions as the Cross of Mourning.

In total the order has 55 distinct insignia. Due to the numerous ways of awarding it has been called "the most complex order in Europe".

== Notable recipients ==
Grand Crosses

- Martti Ahtisaari
- Ion Antonescu
- Walther von Brauchitsch
- Stephan Burián von Rajecz
- Prince Carl, Duke of Västergötland
- Eduard Dietl
- Karl Dönitz
- Adolf Ehrnrooth
- Hermann Göring
- Tarja Halonen
- Erik Heinrichs
- Kaarlo Heiskanen
- Prince Henry of Prussia
- Georg von Hertling
- Heinrich Himmler
- Paul von Hindenburg
- Gustav Hägglund
- Kyösti Kallio
- Juhani Kaskeala
- Wilhelm Keitel
- Urho Kekkonen
- Jan Klenberg
- Mauno Koivisto
- Erich Ludendorff
- Jarl Lundqvist
- Carl Gustaf Emil Mannerheim
- Vilho Petter Nenonen
- Sauli Niinistö
- Karl Lennart Oesch
- Juho Kusti Paasikivi
- Ari Puheloinen
- Erich Raeder
- Risto Ryti
- Aarne Sihvo
- Alexander Stubb
- Lauri Sutela
- Pehr Evind Svinhufvud
- Talaat Pasha
- Jaakko Valtanen
- Väinö Valve
- Rudolf Walden
- Wilhelm II, German Emperor

1st Class with a Star

- Ernst Busch
- Wilhelm Canaris
- Rolf Carls
- Eduard Dietl
- Waldemar Erfurth
- Hans Jeschonnek
- Timo Kivinen
- Hans-Georg von Seidel
- Günther Korten
- Felix Steiner

1st Class

- Karl Allmendinger
- Hans Baur
- Gottlob Berger
- Wilhelm Berlin
- Karl Bodenschatz
- Franz Böhme
- Kurt Böhmer
- Theodor Burchardi
- Leopold Bürkner
- Erich Buschenhagen
- Hans Bütow
- Hans Degen
- Karl Maria Demelhuber
- Erwin Engelbrecht
- Kurt Fricke
- William R. Furlong
- Herbert Gille
- Rüdiger von der Goltz
- Władysław Grabski
- Wilhelm Hasse
- Georg Ritter von Hengl
- Adolf Heusinger
- Otto Hoffmann von Waldau
- Alexander Holle
- Alfred Jodl
- Ferdinand Jodl
- Heinrich Kittel
- Philipp Kleffel
- Matthias Kleinheisterkamp
- August Krakau
- Hans Kreysing
- Karl von Le Suire
- Fanni Luukkonen
- Walter Nowotny
- Friedrich Paulus
- Georg Radziej
- Elisabeth Rehn
- Herbert Rieckhoff
- August Schmidt
- Hubert Schmundt
- Ferdinand Schörner
- Hans-Georg von Seidel
- Karl Weisenberger
- Albert Wodrig
- Kurt Zeitzler
- Arthur Zimmermann

2nd Class

- Eugen-Heinrich Bleyer
- Eckhard Christian
- Gerhard Engel
- Hans-Karl Freiherr von Esebeck
- Nikolaus von Falkenhorst
- Hermann Fischer
- Bruno Frankewitz
- Eberhard Kinzel
- Mauno Koivisto
- Rolf Nevanlinna
- Carl Petersén
- Erich Rudorffer
- Jorma Sarvanto
- Karl Schnörrer
- Reiner Stahel
- Alois Windisch

3rd Class

- Simo Häyhä
- Ilmari Juutilainen
- Paul Klatt
- Einar Lundborg
- Carl Petersén
- Jorma Sarvanto
- Reiner Stahel
- Mikko Hyppönen
- Prince Wolfgang of Hesse

Other or unknown classes

- Franz Augsberger
- Verna Erikson
- John F. "Jack" Hasey
- Olaf Helset
- Harry Järv
- Kurt Kuhlmey
- Rudolph Lambart, 10th Earl of Cavan
- Leonard Mociulschi
- Bernhard Paus
- Walter Schuck
- Hjalmar Siilasvuo
- Arne Somersalo
- Jerzy Świrski

=== Institutions ===
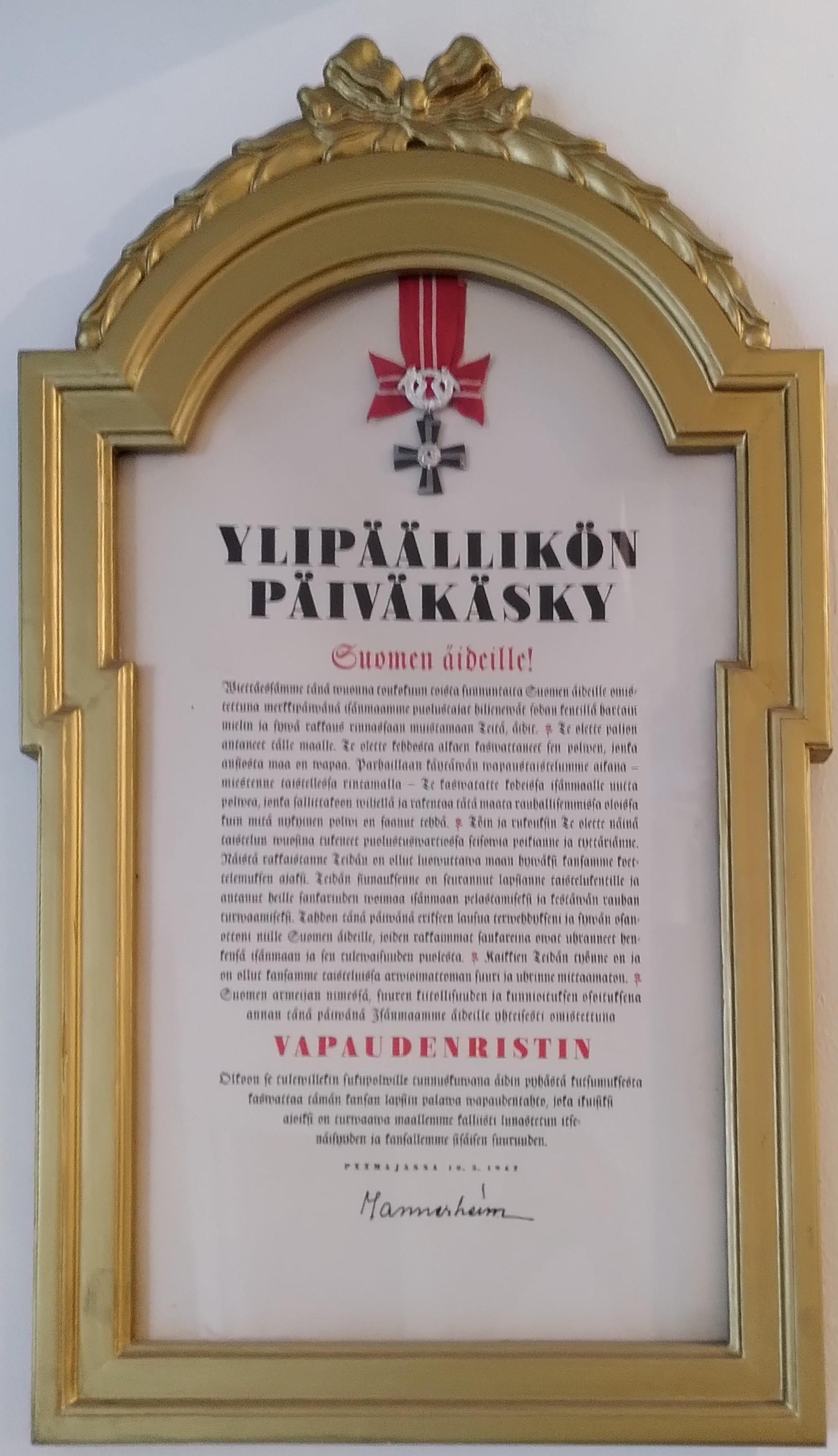
Order of the Day № 60 (1942) awarding Order of the Cross of Liberty, 4th Class to all mothers of Finland

The statutes allow the order to be conferred collectively. The following have been awarded:

- City of Vaasa
- White Guard of Finland
- Karelian Guard Regiment
- Guard Jaeger Battalion
- Nyland Dragoon Regiment
- Field Artillery Regiment 1
- Nyland Regiment
- Karelian Cavalry Jaeger Regiment
- Pori Regiment
- The Invalids' Association of the War of Independence^{[Note]}
- Jaeger Battalion 1
- Jaeger Battalion 2
- Jaeger Battalion 3
- Jaeger Battalion 4
- University of Helsinki
- Cadet School
- Reserve Officer School
- Mothers of Finland
- City of Mikkeli
- Naval Academy
- Disabled War Veterans Association of Finland
- National Defence Institute
- Air Force Academy
- Finland’s War Veteran Association
- The Union of Front Veteran Soldiers
- Federation of Women Veterans in Finland
- Soldiers' Home Association
- Peacekeepers' Association Finland
- Finnish Cadet and Officer Corps Association
- Tammenlehvän perinneliitto

^{[Note]} No official translation available.

== See also ==
- Orders, decorations, and medals of Finland

== See also ==
- Mannerheim Cross
