= Janne Jaakkola =

Finnish general (born 1967)

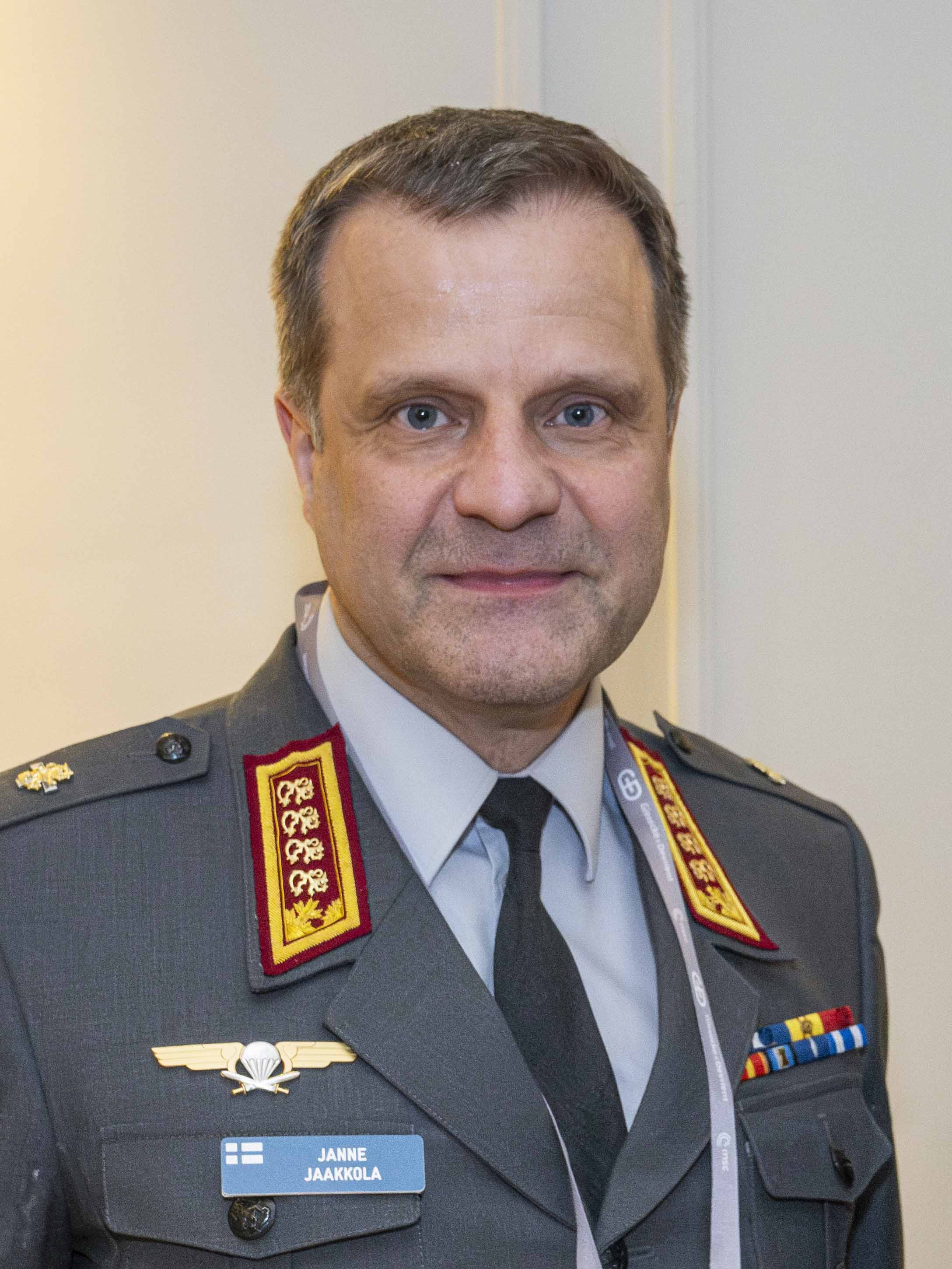
- Jaakkola in 2025
- Born: Janne Alpertti Jaakkola; 17 July 1967 (age 59); Vehmaa, Finland
- Military career
- Allegiance: Finland
- Branch: Finnish Army
- Service years: 1990–present
- Rank: General
- Commands: Chief of Defence; Deputy Chief of Staff, Strategy; Chief of Planning; Special Operations Detachment (EUBG); Special Jaeger Battalion
- Conflicts: Kosovo War; War in Afghanistan

Janne Alpertti Jaakkola (born 17 July 1967 in Vehmaa) is a Finnish general, serving as the Chief of Defence and commander of the Finnish Defence Forces since 1 April 2024.

Jaakkola was started his service as a conscript in 1986, was commissioned as reserve officer in 1987, graduated the military academy in 1990. He was promoted to first lieutenant in 1990, captain in 1994, major in 2000, colonel in 2014, brigadier general in 2017, and a full general in 2024.

== Early life and education ==
Jaakkola was born in Vehmaa on 17 July 1967. He graduated high school at the Tuurepori Upper Secondary School ad entered military service as a conscript of Pori Brigade. After the conscription, he entered the Finland's National Defence University in 1990, with infantry as his branch. There, he excelled in a rare manner, being both the at the top of his class, and being the military senior of his course, in Cadet rank of Kadettivääpeli. He subsequently completed general staff officer courses such as the Infantry Captain Course in 1993, the staff officer course from 1997 to 1998, the Finnish National Defence Course in 2006 and the Senior Command Course in 2007. Jaakkola also completed the General Staff Officer Course at the Norwegian Defence University College in Oslo, Norway.

== Military career ==
After Jaakkola's graduation from the military academy, he first served as a platoon commander and instructor at the Airborne Ranger School in 1990 to 1993, where he trained future airborne units in helicopter assault, sabotage, and paratrooping operations. He later served as a Company Commander at the same school in 1994 to 1996. He was named as Chief of Office at the Airborne Ranger School in 1996 to 1997, until he was later placed as Staff Officer at the Utti Jaeger Regiment from 1998 to 2000, where he also served as Chief of Office from 2000 to 2002. Jaakkola later served as senior staff officer both in the Western Command Headquarters and in the Defence Command Intelligence Division from 2002 to 2004, and was eventually deployed as a member of the Finnish Contingent under the Kosovo Force (KFOR) in 2003 for crisis management operations. Jaakkola also served as an Aide de Camp to the then Chief of Defence, Admiral Juhani Kaskeala from 2004 to 2007, before being named as Battalion Commander of the Special Jaeger Battalion of the Utti Jaeger Regiment in 2007 to 2010. During his stint as the Battalion Commander, Jaakkola was later deployed in Afghanistan for a year, where he served as part of the Finnish Contingent under the International Security Assistance Force (ISAF) from 2009 to 2010, where he was involved in various missions, ranging from cooperation with Afghan local rebel groups to humanitarian aid and development initiatives. After his tour of duty in Afghanistan, Jaakkola later served as commander of the Special Operations Detachment (EUBG) from 2010 to 2011.

Jaakkola later became a senior staff officer at the Ministry of Defence from 2011 to 2013, before serving as the Chief of Staff of the Pori Brigade in 2013–2015, and later as Chief of Branch in the Defence Command Plans and Policy Division in 2015 to 2017, where he led strategic planning initiatives and laid out plans for modernizing the armed force's strategies. Jaakkola later served as Assistant Chief of Staff Logistics in 2018 to 2020, where he was promoted to the rank or Brigadier General. Jaakkola later served as Chief of Planning at the Defense Command Headquarters in 2021–2022 and was later named as Deputy Chief of Staff, Strategy in 2023–2024, which was his most recent role before ascending to the Chief of Defence. On 31 January 2024, President Sauli Niinistö named Jaakkola as the new Chief of Defence, and later replaced General Timo Kivinen. His 5-year term is set to expire on 31 March 2029.

== Ranks from military service ==
- First Lieutenant 1987
- Senior Lieutenant 1990
- Captain 1994
- Major 2000
- Lieutenant Colonel 2007
- Colonel 2014
- Brigadier General 2017
- Major General 2021
- Lieutenant General 2023
- General 2024

== Awards from military service ==
- Grand Cross of the White Rose of Finland
- Commander, Order of the Lion of Finland
- 3rd Class with Swords, Order of the Cross of Liberty
- Medal of Military Merit
- NATO Medal for
- NATO Medal (Non-Article 5) for his service in Afghanistan (ISAF)
- Finnish Parachutist Badge, 1st class

== Personal life ==
Jaakkola is married to Marjo née Hiltunen, with one child. Alongside his military duties he manages the family farm near Turku. He also does CrossFit exercises and does gym workouts during his freetime. His hobbies include Brazilian jiu-jitsu, karate, as well as Krav Maga, in which he is a qualified trainer and holds a 2nd dan.

Military offices
Preceded by General Timo Kivinen	Chief of Defence; 2024–	Succeeded by in office
