= Sihvo =

Sihvo is a Finnish surname.

== Geographical distribution ==
As of 2014, 92.8% of all known bearers of the surname Sihvo were residents of Finland (frequency 1:7,886), 4.7% of Sweden (1:281,336) and 1.5% of Canada (1:3,345,273).

In Finland, the frequency of the surname was higher than national average (1:7,886) in the following regions:

1. South Karelia (1:2,003)
2. Kymenlaakso (1:3,351)
3. Päijänne Tavastia (1:3,749)
4. Tavastia Proper (1:3,980)
5. Pirkanmaa (1:5,318)
6. Southern Savonia (1:7,153)
7. Uusimaa (1:7,768)
8. Lapland (1:7,876)

== People ==
- Aarne Sihvo (1889–1963), Finnish general and Member of Parliament
