= Army of the Isthmus =

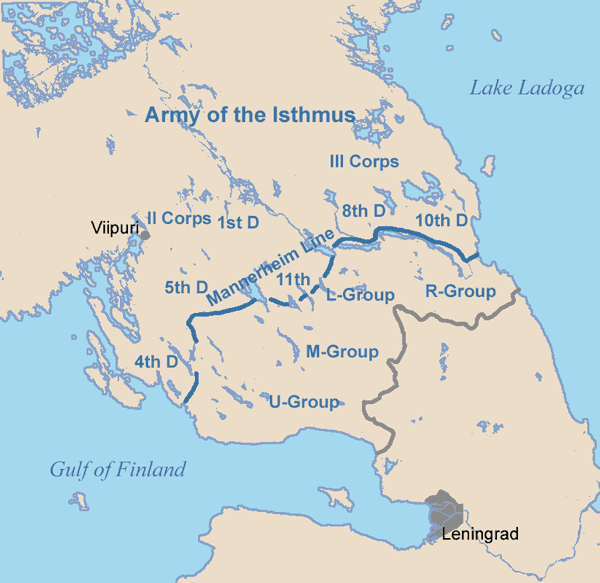
Positions of the different units of the Army of the Isthmus at the beginning of the Winter War.

The Army of the Isthmus (Finnish: Kannaksen Armeija) was an army formation of the Finnish Army during the Winter War. It was stationed on the Karelian Isthmus and was the largest formation of the Finnish Army, as it was charged to defend the important isthmus.

== Organisation ==
The army was organized into two corps. At the beginning of the war it had one division in reserve. Along the Soviet border four delaying groups of smaller units was deployed.

- II Corps (II AK) under Lieutenant General Harald Öhquist
  - 4th Division
  - 5th Division
  - 11th Division (later the 2nd Division)
  - Cavalry Brigade
- III Corps (III AK) under Major General Erik Heinrichs.
  - 8th Division
  - 10th Division (later the 7th Division)
- Reserve
  - 1st Division

Immediately by the border on the isthmus were the four delaying groups named after their location:

- U-Group at Uusikirkko
- M-Group at Muolaa
- L-Group at Lipola
- R-Group at Rautu

On February 25 the II Corps was split and a new I Corps was established. It was given the 1st and 2nd Divisions (former 11th Division).

== Commanders ==
- Lieutenant General Hugo Österman (until 19 February 1940)
- Lieutenant General Erik Heinrichs (after 19 February 1940)

== See also ==
- Finnish Army (1939)
- List of Finnish corps in the Winter War
- List of Finnish divisions in the Winter War
