= Hugo Österman =

Finnish general (1892–1975)

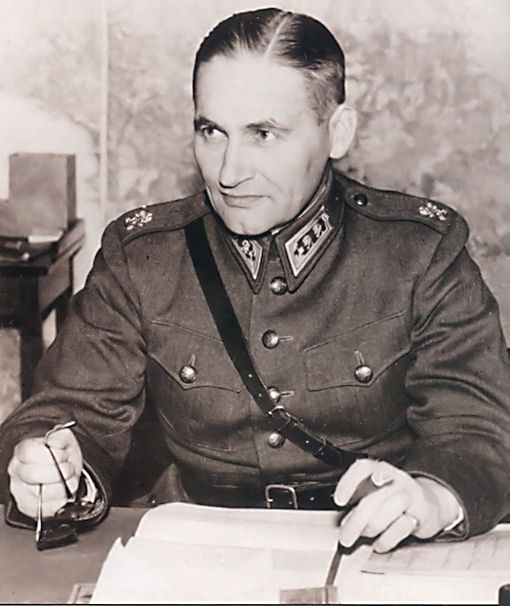

Chief of Defence
- In office 1933–1939

Deputy Minister of Defence
- In office 10 July 1930 – 21 March 1931

Personal details
- Born: 5 September 1892 Helsinki, Finland
- Died: 17 February 1975 (aged 82) Helsinki, Finland
- Awards: Grand Officer of the Legion of Honour; Grand Cross of the Order of the Lion of Finland; Order of the Cross of Liberty; Commander First Class of the Order of the White Rose of Finland; King George VI Coronation Medal; Knight Grand Cross of the Order of the Crown of Italy; Order of the Three Stars; Grand Cross of the Order of Polonia Restituta; Order of the Sword - Commander Grand Cross; Knight Grand Officer of the Order of the Polar Star; Order of the German Eagle; Iron Cross; Order of Merit of the Kingdom of Hungary; Order of the Cross of the Eagle; Finnish Olympic Cross of Merit

Military service
- Allegiance: Finland
- Branch/service: Finnish Army
- Rank: Lieutenant-general
- Commands: Army of the Isthmus
- Battles/wars: Winter War, Continuation War

Hugo Viktor Österman (5 September 1892 – 17 February 1975) was a Finland-Swedish lieutenant-general. He served as Chief of Defence from 1933 to 1939 and commanded the Army of the Isthmus during the Winter War.

== Biography ==
Österman was born in Helsinki, the son of police officer Viktor Valfrid Österman and Elin Karolina Karlsdotter. He graduated from Svenska normallyceum in Helsinki. Österman underwent military training at the Finnish Jäger Battalion in Germany from 1915 to 1918 and the Royal Swedish Army Staff College (now the Swedish Defence University) in Sweden from 1927 to 1928. After returning to Finland in February 1918, Österman was ordered to Kuopio to found a Jäger Battalion composed of conscripts. After the Civil War, he became commander of the Pori Regiment, from 1925 commander of the 3rd Division and from 1927 inspector of the infantry.

Österman became a major in 1918, lieutenant colonel in 1920, colonel in 1925, major general in 1930 and lieutenant general in 1935. Österman served as Deputy Minister of Defence from 10 July 1930 to 21 March 1931. After the Mäntsälä rebellion in 1932, Österman served as governor of Uusimaa Province for six months.

He was commander of the Finnish Armed Forces from 1933 to 1939. When the Winter War started Österman was made commander of the Army of the Isthmus, but was relieved of command in February 1940 after the Finnish lines, also known as the Mannerheim Line, had been breached.

During the Continuation War he served as an inspector in the army and in 1944 he was the commander-in-chief's representative in the Oberkommando der Wehrmacht. Österman retired from active service in 1946 and thereafter worked in business.

Österman married Marga von Troil in 1919.

Military offices
Preceded by Lieutenant General Aarne Sihvo	Chief of Defence; 1933–1939	Succeeded by Marshal C. G. E. Mannerheim
