= Eckhard Christian =

German World War II general (1907–1985)

- Born: 1 December 1907; Charlottenburg near Berlin, Province of Brandenburg, Kingdom of Prussia, German Empire
- Died: 3 January 1985 (aged 77); Bad Kreuznach, West Germany
- Spouse(s): Ursula Lüdecke (m. 1936; div. 1939); 3 children Gerda Christian (m. 1943; div. 1946)
- Military career
- Allegiance: Weimar Republic; Nazi Germany
- Branch: Reichsmarine; Luftwaffe
- Service years: 1926–1934; 1934–1945
- Rank: Oberleutnant zur See; Generalmajor
- Conflicts: World War II: Operation Weserübung; Battles of Narvik; Battle of Berlin
- Awards: War Merit Cross; Iron Cross; German Cross in Silver

Eckhard Christian (1 December 1907 – 3 January 1985) was a Luftwaffe officer in World War II, and rose to the rank of Generalmajor. On 2 February 1943, he married Gerda Daranowski who was one of Adolf Hitler's private secretaries during World War II. Christian was captured by British troops on 8 May 1945 and held in custody until 7 May 1947.

== Biography ==
Eckhard Christian was born in Charlottenburg (Berlin). He first joined the Reichsmarine (German Navy) in 1926. In 1928 and 1929, he attended officer candidate courses. Thereafter, he continued in the navy and obtained the rank of Leutnant zur See (second lieutenant) on 1 October 1930. In 1934, Christian transferred to the Luftwaffe (German Air force) glider school in Warnemünde. He was promoted to the rank of Hauptmann (captain) on 1 April 1935. He was transferred to the Air Ministry in July 1938 and onto the General Staff. On 1 June 1940, he was promoted to major and from 15 January 1941 was attached to Chief of the Armed Forces Command Staff at Adolf Hitler's Führer HQ. Christian was promoted to Oberstleutnant (lieutenant colonel) on 15 March 1942.

It was there at Hitler's HQ that Christian met Gerda "Dara" Daranowski, who was working as one of Adolf Hitler's private secretaries. They were married on 2 February 1943 in Danzig. Gerda Christian then took a break from her employment for Hitler. Christian was promoted to Oberst (colonel) on 1 March 1943. In mid-1943, Gerda Christian returned to Hitler's staff as one of his private secretaries. After the suicide of Generaloberst Hans Jeschonnek, when the latter was replaced by Günther Korten, Christian was appointed to the Luftwaffe Command Staff at Hitler's request. One year later, he was promoted to Generalmajor and made Chef des Luftwaffe-Führungsstabes (Chief of the Luftwaffe Command Staff) at Hitler's request on 1 September 1944.

In April 1945, Christian was stationed in Berlin at the Führerbunker HQ. He left the bunker complex on 22 April 1945 to become chief of the liaison staff of the Luftwaffe to OKW Command Staff North. His wife, Gerda, was one of two secretaries who volunteered to remain with Hitler in the Führerbunker.

On 8 May 1945, he surrendered to British troops in Mürwik and was held in custody until 7 May 1947. Gerda did not ever reunite with her husband after the war ended. Gerda divorced Christian in 1946 because he did not remain with her in the Führerbunker until after the death of Hitler. Christian died on 3 January 1985 in Bad Kreuznach.

== Promotions ==
- 1 April 1926 Matrose (sailor)
- 12 October 1926 Seekadett (officer candidate)
- 1 April 1927 Gefreiter (private E-2 / lance corporal)
- 1 April 1928 Fähnrich zur See (officer cadet)
- 1 July 1928 Obermaat (chief petty officer)
- 1 June 1930 Oberfähnrich zur See (senior officer cadet)
- 1 October 1930 Leutnant zur See (2nd lieutenant at sea)
- 1 January 1933 Oberleutnant zur See (1st lieutenant at sea)

=== Luftwaffe ===
- 1 October 1934 Oberleutnant (1st lieutenant) with rank seniority (RDA) from 1 January 1933 (2)
- 1 April 1935 Hauptmann (captain) (11)
  - 1 October 1938 Hauptmann i. G. (captain in general staff)
- 1 June 1940 Major (4)
  - 14 November 1940 received new and improved RDA from 1 December 1939 (9)
- 15 March 1942 Oberstleutnant (lieutenant colonel) with effect from 1 March 1942 (87)
- 1 March 1943 Oberst (colonel)
  - 20 April 1943 Oberst i. G. (colonel in general staff) with effect from 1 April 1943
  - 21 September 1943 received new and improved RDA from 1 October 1943 (12)
  - 24 January 1944 received new and improved RDA from 1 September 1943 (11a)
- 16 September 1944 Generalmajor (major general) with effect and RDA from 1 September 1944 (8)

== Awards and decorations ==
- Luftwaffe Observer Badge on 19 September 1935
- Wehrmacht Long Service Award
  - 4th Class on 2 October 1936
  - 1st Class on 31 March 1938
- Combined Pilot/Observer Badge of the Luftwaffe on 7 October 1938
- Sudetenland Medal with the “Prague Castle” clasp on 8 August 1939
- Memelland Medal on 26 October 1939
- Iron Cross (1939), 2nd and 1st Class
  - 2nd Class on 10 April 1940
  - 1st Class on 5 May 1940
- Narvik Shield
- Front Flying Clasp of the Luftwaffe
- Order of Military Merit (Bulgaria), Officer (IV. Grade) with War Decoration on 17 February 1942
- Finnish Order of the Cross of Liberty, 2nd Class with Swords on 18 August 1943
- War Merit Cross (1939), 2nd and 1st Class with Swords
  - 2nd Class on 30 January 1944
  - 1st Class on 20 April 1944
- German Cross in Silver on 10 May 1945 as Generalmajor and Chief of the Luftwaffen-Führungsstab and Verbindungskommando zum OKW-Stab

== See also ==
- Air warfare of World War II
- Glossary of German military terms
