= Kaarlo Edvard Kivekäs =

Finnish general

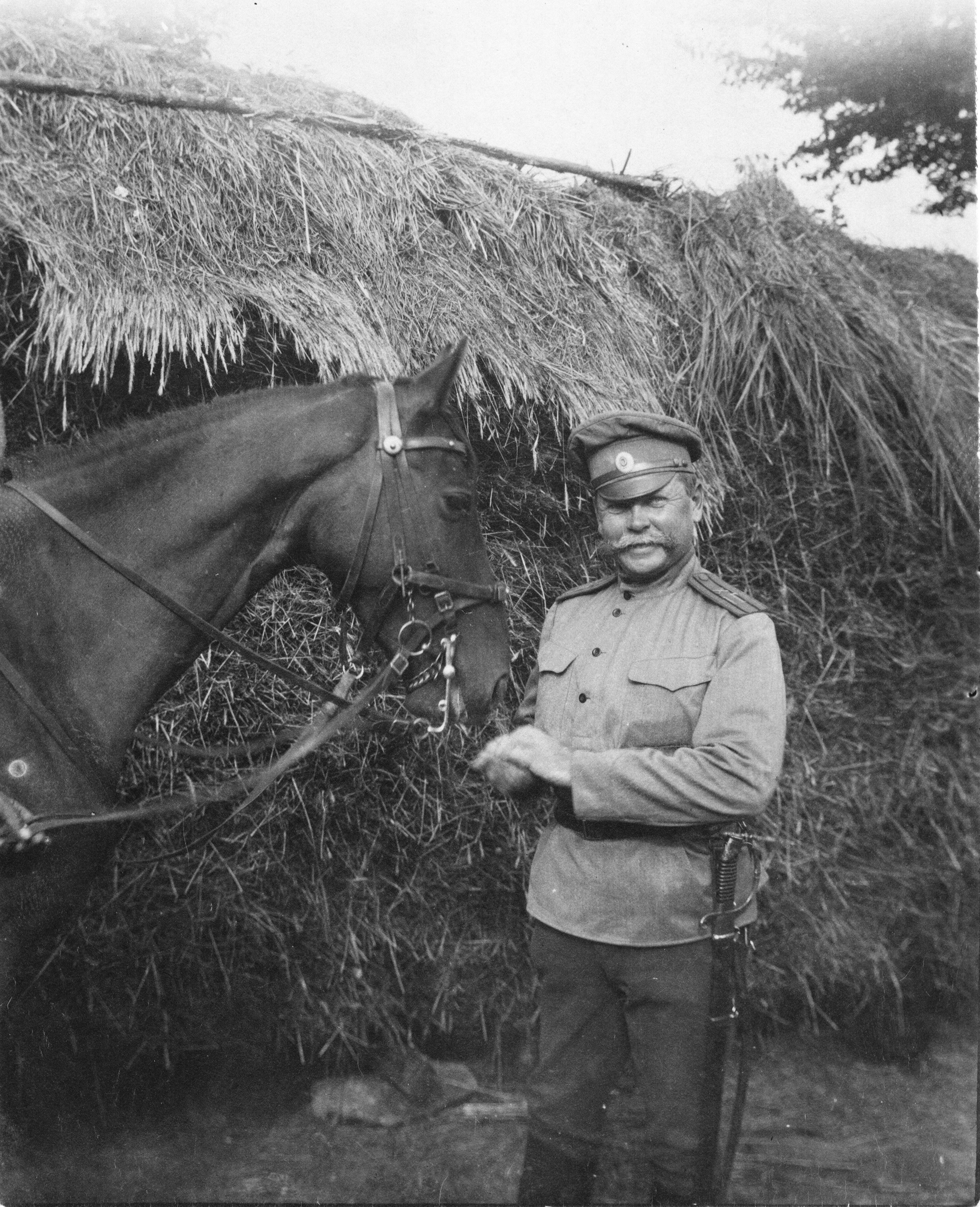
Kaarlo Kivekäs.

Kaarlo Edvard Kivekäs (6 December 1866, in Valkeala – 19 February 1940, in Hämeenlinna; original name Karl Edvard Backman until 1880) was a Finnish general. Educated at Hamina Cadet School (1886–1890), he served in the Russian army from 1890 on, in the Pamir area, under the command of, M.E. Ionova, the leader of a Russian Expedition in 1893, he was fluent in Shughni, Tajik, Uzbek, and Kyrgyz, and reportedly understanding of the traditions and cultures of the people of the Pamir area, who purportedly held him in high regard, ending his service there as a Lieutenant Colonel on October 13, 1908, and later Kivekäs served in World War I, becoming a Major General on September 23, 1916. After the Finnish Civil War, he returned to Finland, being accepted as a Major General sometime around 1918. He also was the Chief of Defence of the Finnish Defence Forces in 1919. Kivekäs is the recipient of the Latvian military Order of Lāčplēsis, 2nd class.
