= Chief of Defence (Finland) =

Highest-ranking professional military officer in the Finnish Armed Forces

Chief of the Finnish Defence
- Puolustusvoimain komentaja (Finnish); Kommendören för försvarsmakten (Swedish)
- Flag of the Chief of Defence

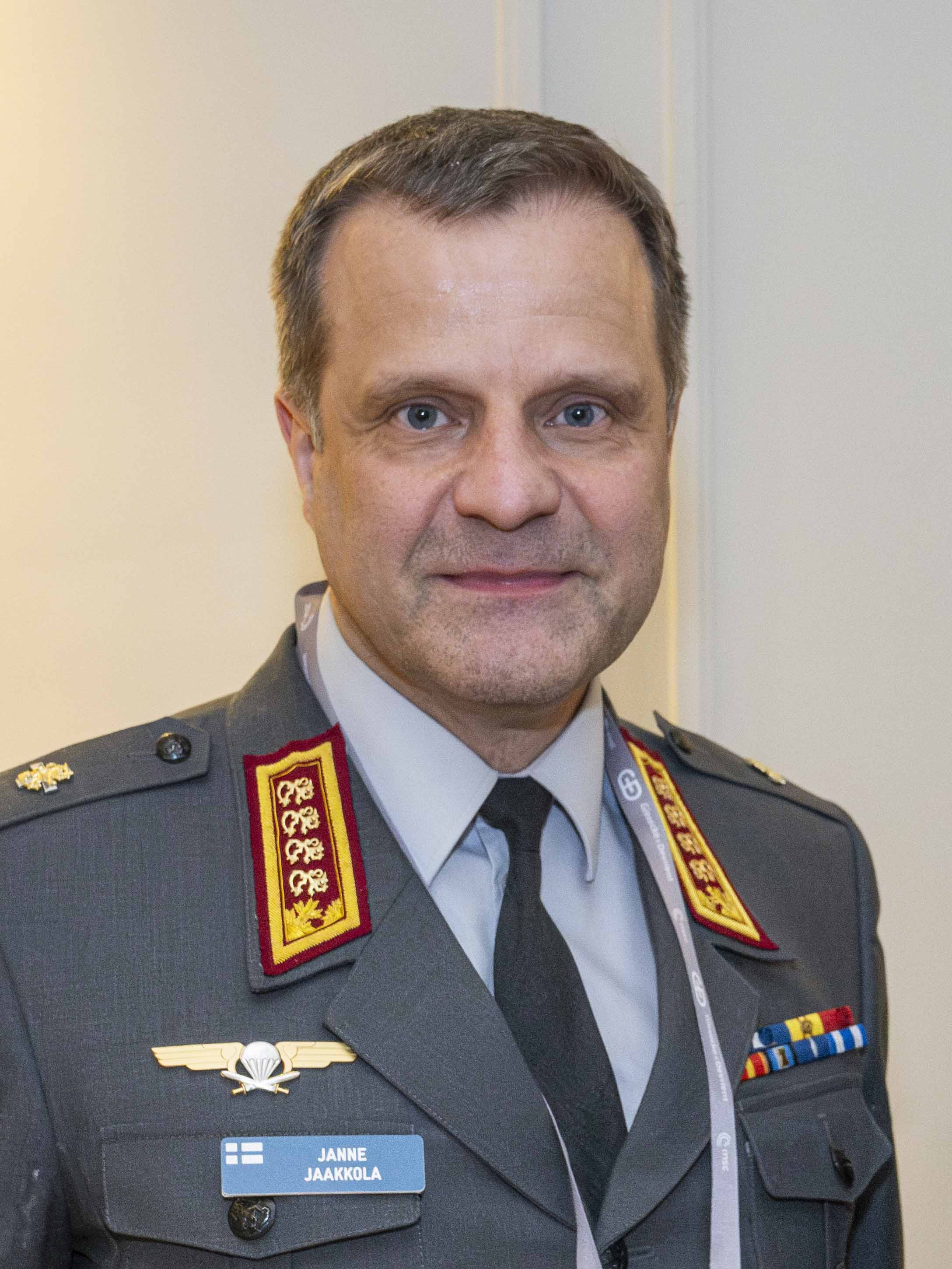
- Incumbent; General Janne Jaakkola since 1 April 2024
- Finnish Defence Forces
- Reports to: President of the Republic; Minister of Defence
- Nominator: The Government
- Appointer: President of the Republic
- Formation: 28 January 1918; 108 years ago
- First holder: Carl Gustaf Emil Mannerheim
- Deputy: Chief of Staff of the Defence Command
- Website: Official website

The Chief of Defence (Finnish: Puolustusvoimain komentaja, Swedish: Kommendören för försvarsmakten lit. 'Commander of the Defence Forces') is the chief of defence and commander of the Finnish Defence Forces, under the authority of the President of Finland.

The Chief of Defence commands the Finnish Army, the Finnish Air Force, the Finnish Navy and is assisted by the Defence Command. He is the highest-ranking officer of the forces (Admiral or General) and his deputy is the Chief of Staff of the Defence Command (Finnish: pääesikunnan päällikkö).

The current Chief of Defence is General Janne Jaakkola.

== Role and functions ==
In contrast to many other Western countries, the Finnish Defence Forces have an actual military commander with direct authority over all forces, and the Chief of Staff is a separate position. The Chief of Defence is responsible for all operative aspects of the Defence Forces, while the Minister of Defence plans the long-term economical aspects. In administrative matters, the Chief of Defence has the authority to form or disband any unit below brigade level and to make any necessary reorganization to the command structure of the Defence Forces, unless such changes have wide impacts on the Finnish society, on the finances of the state or on the personnel of the Defence Forces. In command matters, the Chief of Defence has the authority to make any command decision that is not reserved to the President of Finland. In matters reserved to the Minister of Defence or to the President of Finland, the Chief of Defence prepares the decision and introduces his proposal to the Minister or to the President.

The immediate subordinates of the Chief of Defence are

- Chief-of-staff of the Defence Command
- Commander of the Finnish Army
- Commander of the Finnish Navy
- Commander of the Finnish Air Force
- Rector of the National Defence University

The Chief of Defence is appointed by the President on the nomination of the Finnish Council of State and may be asked to retire whenever a reason occurs. However, since 1972, all Chiefs of Defence have retired only after fulfilling the statutory retirement age of 63.

== List of Finnish Chiefs of Defence ==
No.	Portrait	Chief of Defence	Took office	Left office	Time in office	Defence branch
1	Carl Gustaf Emil Mannerheim	General of Cavalry; Carl Gustaf Emil Mannerheim (1867–1951) (as Supreme Commander of the forces of the Republic of Finland)	28 January 1918	30 May 1918	122 days	Finnish Army
2	Karl Fredrik Wilkama	Major General; Karl Fredrik Wilkama (1876–1947) (as Supreme Commander of the Finnish Military Forces)	31 May 1918	12 August 1918	74 days	Finnish Army
3	Vilhelm Aleksander Thesleff	Major General; Vilhelm Aleksander Thesleff (1880–1941) (as Minister of Defence)	13 August 1918	27 November 1918	106 days	Finnish Army
4	Rudolf Walden	Colonel; Rudolf Walden (1878–1946) (as Minister of War)	27 November 1918	31 December 1918	34 days	Finnish Army
(2)	Karl Fredrik Wilkama	Major General; Karl Fredrik Wilkama (1876–1947) (as Commander of the Finnish Army)	1 January 1919	19 June 1919	169 days	Finnish Army
5	Kaarlo Edward Kivekäs	Major General; Kaarlo Edward Kivekäs (1866–1940) (as Commander of the Finnish Army)	20 June 1919	11 September 1919	83 days	Finnish Army
(2)	Karl Fredrik Wilkama	Major General; Karl Fredrik Wilkama (1876–1947) (as Commander of the Hosts)	12 September 1919	7 August 1924	4 years, 330 days	Finnish Army
6	Vilho Petter Nenonen	Lieutenant General; Vilho Petter Nenonen (1883–1960) (as Commander of the Hosts)	8 August 1924	16 April 1925	251 days	Finnish Army
7	Lauri Malmberg	Colonel; Lauri Malmberg (1888–1948) (as Commander of the Hosts)	16 April 1925	1 October 1925	168 days	Finnish Army
(2)	Karl Fredrik Wilkama	Lieutenant General; Karl Fredrik Wilkama (1876–1947) (as Commander of the Hosts)	2 October 1925	21 May 1926	231 days	Finnish Army
8	Aarne Sihvo	Lieutenant General; Aarne Sihvo (1889–1963) (as Commander of the Hosts)	21 May 1926	15 January 1933	6 years, 239 days	Finnish Army
9	Hugo Viktor Österman	Lieutenant General; Hugo Viktor Österman (1892–1975) (as Commander of the Hosts)	15 January 1933	16 October 1939	6 years, 274 days	Finnish Army
(1)	Carl Gustaf Emil Mannerheim	Field Marshal; Carl Gustaf Emil Mannerheim (1867–1951); Acting (Note: The official list of Chiefs of Defence on the Finnish Defence Forces site (Retrieved 2016-01-15) does not list Mannerheim as a Chief of Defence. This is because the position of sotaväen päällikkö (Commander of the Hosts) was not abolished. Instead, the newly formed position of puolustusvoimain komentaja was the commander of puolustuslaitos, the contemporary name of the Defence Forces, the Finnish Border Guard and the White Guard.)	17 October 1939	20 November 1939	34 days	Finnish Army
(1)	Carl Gustaf Emil Mannerheim	Marshal of Finland; Carl Gustaf Emil Mannerheim (1867–1951) (Note: From 1942 onwards, prior to that, Field Marshal) (as Commander-in-Chief )	20 November 1939	12 January 1945	5 years, 53 days	Finnish Army
10	Erik Heinrichs	General of the Infantry; Erik Heinrichs (1890–1965)	12 January 1945	1 July 1945	170 days	Finnish Army
11	Jarl Lundqvist	Lieutenant General; Jarl Lundqvist (1896–1965)	2 July 1945	3 June 1946	336 days	Finnish Air Force
(8)	Aarne Sihvo	General of the Infantry; Aarne Sihvo (1889–1963)	4 June 1946	31 May 1953	6 years, 361 days	Finnish Army
12	Kaarlo Heiskanen	General of the Infantry; Kaarlo Heiskanen (1894–1962)	1 June 1953	28 October 1959	6 years, 149 days	Finnish Army
13	Sakari Simelius	General of the Infantry; Sakari Simelius (1900–1985)	29 October 1959	12 November 1965	5 years, 348 days	Finnish Army
14	Yrjö Keinonen	General of the Infantry; Yrjö Keinonen (1912–1977)	13 November 1965	30 April 1969	3 years, 199 days	Finnish Army
15	Kaarlo Leinonen	General; Kaarlo Leinonen (1914–1975)	1 May 1969	14 March 1974	4 years, 317 days	Finnish Army
16	Lauri Sutela	General; Lauri Sutela (1918–2011)	15 March 1974	11 October 1983	9 years, 210 days	Finnish Army
17	Jaakko Valtanen	General; Jaakko Valtanen (1925–2024)	12 October 1983	28 February 1990	6 years, 139 days	Finnish Army
18	Jan Klenberg	Admiral; Jan Klenberg (1931–2020)	1 March 1990	31 October 1994	4 years, 244 days	Finnish Navy
19	Gustav Hägglund	General; Gustav Hägglund (born 1938)	1 November 1994	3 June 2001	6 years, 214 days	Finnish Army
20	Juhani Kaskeala	Admiral; Juhani Kaskeala (born 1946)	4 June 2001	31 July 2009	8 years, 57 days	Finnish Navy
21	Ari Puheloinen	General; Ari Puheloinen (born 1951)	1 August 2009	31 July 2014	4 years, 364 days	Finnish Army
22	Jarmo Lindberg	General; Jarmo Lindberg (born 1959)	1 August 2014	31 July 2019	4 years, 364 days	Finnish Air Force
23	Timo Kivinen	General; Timo Kivinen (born 1959)	1 August 2019	31 March 2024	4 years, 244 days	Finnish Army
24	Janne Jaakkola	General; Janne Jaakkola (born 1967)	1 April 2024	Incumbent	2 years, 159 days	Finnish Army
