= Kaarlo Heiskanen =

Finnish general

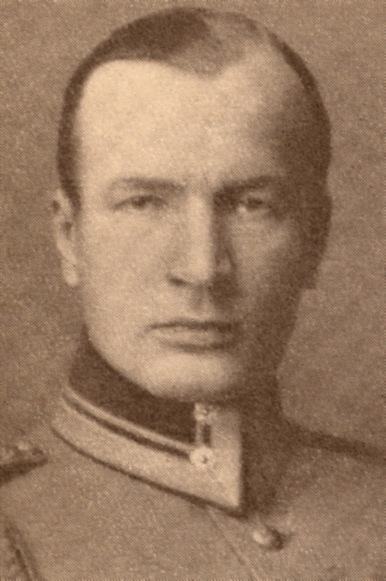
Kaarlo Heiskanen

Kaarlo Aleksanteri (Aleksander) Heiskanen (28 October 1894 in Joroinen – 6 November 1962 in Hämeenlinna) was a Finnish general and Knight of the Mannerheim Cross. He was the Chief of Defence of the Finnish Defence Forces between 1953 and 1959.

Military offices
Preceded by General Aarne Sihvo	Chief of Defence; 1953–1959	Succeeded by General Sakari Simelius
