= Jarl Lundqvist =

Finnish lieutenant general

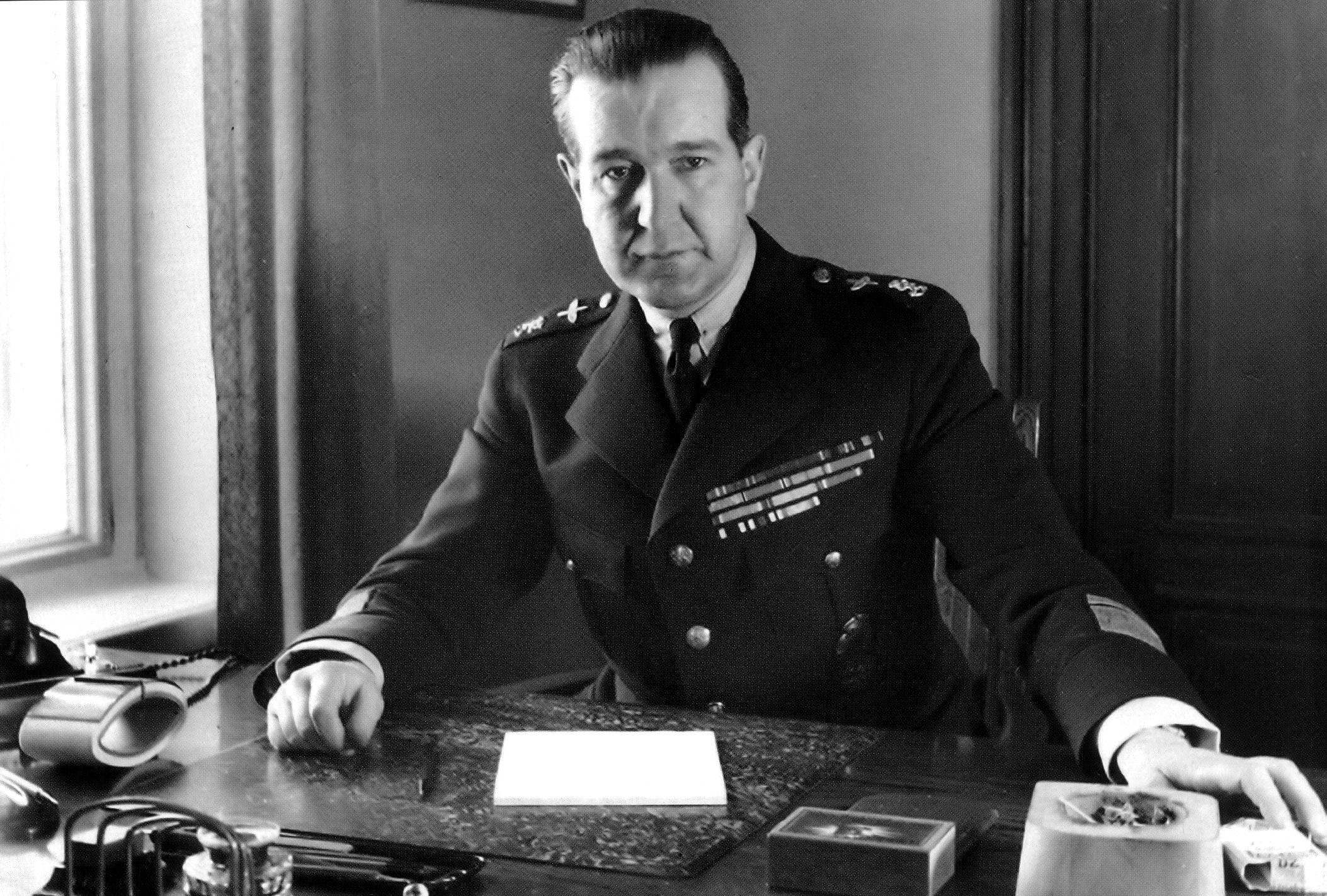
Jarl Lundqvist

Jarl Frithiof Lundqvist (August 15, 1896 in Helsinki – September 23, 1965) was a Finnish lieutenant general. Lundqvist was the Commander of the Finnish Air Force from 8 September 1932 to 29 June 1945. After World War II, he was the Chief of Defence of the Finnish Defence Forces between 1945 and 1946.

Military offices
Preceded by Väinö Vuori	Commander of the Finnish Air Force; 8 September 1932 – 29 June 1945	Succeeded by Frans Helminen
Preceded by Erik Heinrichs	Commander of the Defence Forces; 2 July 1945 – 3 June 1946	Succeeded by Aarne Sihvo
