= Jarmo Lindberg =

Finnish Air Force General, politician and former Chief of Defence

Jarmo Ilmari Lindberg
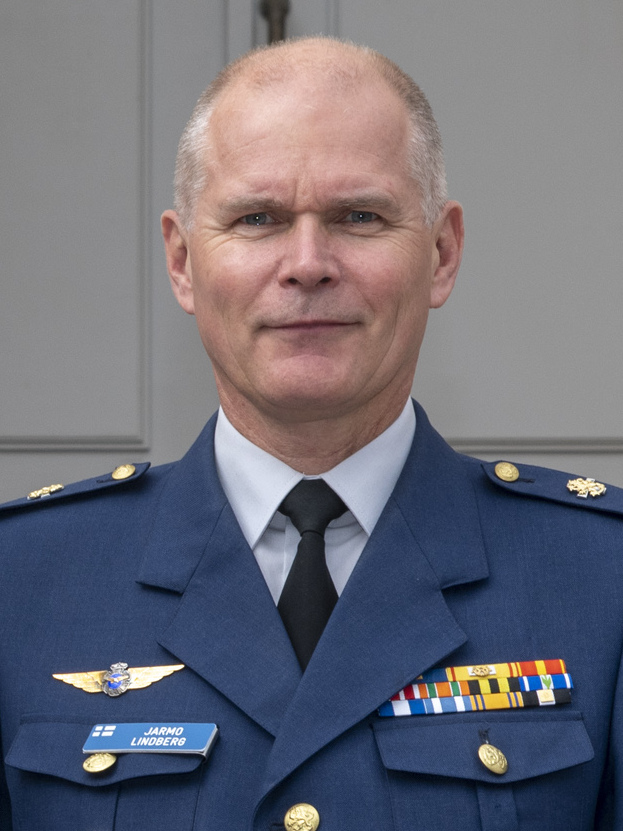
- Jarmo Lindberg in 2018
- Born: 10 June 1959 (age 67); Oulu, Finland
- Military career
- Allegiance: Finland
- Branch: Finnish Air Force
- Service years: 1978–2019
- Rank: General
- Nickname: "Charles"
- Commands: Lapland Air Command; Finnish Air Force; Finnish Defence Forces

Jarmo Ilmari Lindberg (born 10 June 1959) is a retired Finnish general and former Chief of Defence from 2014 to 2019. Lindberg began his career as a fighter pilot, and was eventually promoted to Commander of the Finnish Air Force (in 2008) and then Deputy Chief of Staff, Logistics and Armaments in the Defence Command (in 2012). He is also a member of the Parliament from the National Coalition Party since 2023.

== Career ==
Lindberg graduated from the Kuusaa gymnasium in Kouvola in 1978 and completed his mandatory military service in Training Air Wing, Finnish Air Force in Kauhava, and was active as a hobby pilot. In the 1970s he received the nickname "Charles" Lindberg, after the famous aviator Charles Lindbergh. He maintains an active Twitter account by that name.

In 1979, Lindberg enrolled in the flight cadet course and graduated in 1982, receiving a promotion to luutnantti (Lieutenant). He flew as an officer pilot, instructor and demo pilot in Karelia Air Command in 1982–87, flying Soviet MiG–21BIS 1988 fighter planes, and was promoted to flight commander in 1989. In 1993–94, Lindberg was the Chief of Pilot Training in the Finnish Air Force headquarters in Tikkakoski, Jyväskylä. In 1995, American McDonnell Douglas F/A-18 Hornets were purchased to become the frontline fighter jets for the Finnish Air Force, replacing Saab Drakens and MiGs. Lindberg attended a seven-month US Navy F/A–18 Hornet training course in Naval Air Station Lemoore, California, and participated in the acquisition, introduction and maintenance of the Hornets. In 1995–1999 Lindberg was the Commander of Fighter Squadron 21 in Satakunta Air Command. In 1999 Lindberg was promoted to the Air Force Command, working as a Deputy Chief of Staff Air Force Operations and Chief of Plans and Ops (A5/A3). After working as Assistant Chief of Finnish Defence Staff (Ops Division) in the Defence Command in Helsinki, he again served as a commander in Lapland Air Command, Rovaniemi in 2005.

In 2005, he received promotion to brigadier general, and worked as the Deputy Chief of Operations in 2005–2008. In 2008–2012 he was the Commander of the Finnish Air Force, strongly promoting international cooperation. In 2012–2014, he returned to the Defence Command as Deputy Chief of Staff, Logistics and Armaments. In 2014, General Ari Puheloinen reached statutory retirement age, and Lindberg was appointed as the Chief of Defence i.e. commander of the Finnish Defence Forces. He served in the position until August 2019, when he transferred to the reserve.

== Promotions ==
- Lieutenant 1982
- First Lieutenant 1984
- Captain 1987
- Major 1992
- Lieutenant Colonel 1995
- Colonel 2001
- Brigadier General 2005
- Major General 2008
- Lieutenant General 2011
- General 2014

== Honors ==
- Grand Cross, Order of the White Rose of Finland (Finland, 2016)
- Cross of Liberty, 1st Class, Order of the Cross of Liberty (Finland, 2009)
- Military merit medal (Finland, 1996)
- Cross of Merit of the War Invalides (Finland, 2015)
- Golden Medal of the Finnish Reserve Officers’ Federation (Finland, 2016)
- Commander Degree, Legion of Merit (United States)

In 2015 Lindberg received an Honorary doctorate at the University of Turku.

== Criticism ==
In 2016, the National Audit Office (NAO) officially criticized Lindberg for frequently attending hunting and fishing events organized by military suppliers and contractors. Lindberg had spent 25 days a year on these trips. Many of them were without any official programme, and travel was paid by the organizer, which goes against the regulations of the FDF. NAO also found a liability in that this sort of culture for breaching regulations could spread to the rest of the organization; some evidence of other generals behaving similarly was found. Nevertheless, Assistant Parliamentary Ombudsman Maija Sakslin reviewed the case and decided not to prosecute, finding Lindberg's attendance of these social events acceptable.

Military offices
Preceded by General Ari Puheloinen	Chief of Defence; 2014-2019	Succeeded by General Timo Kivinen
