= Timo Kivinen =

Finnish general and former Chief of Defence (born 1959)

Timo Pekka Kivinen
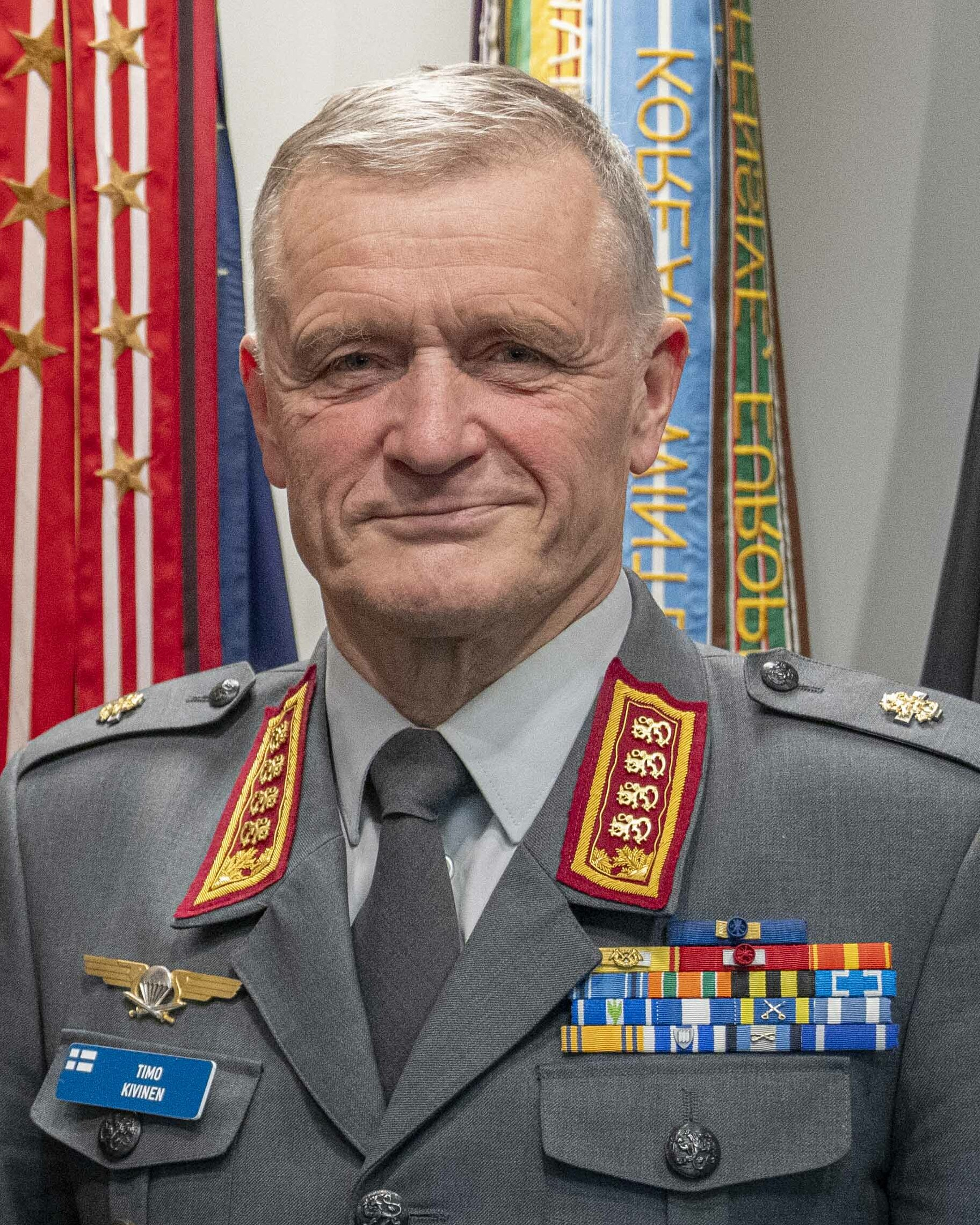
- Kivinen in 2023
- Born: 8 December 1959 (age 66); Lappeenranta, Finland
- Military career
- Allegiance: Finland
- Branch: Finnish Army
- Service years: 1977–2024
- Rank: General
- Commands: Chief of Defence; Commander, Finnish Defence Command; Deputy Chief of Staff, Strategy; Karelia Brigade
- Conflicts: NATO intervention in Bosnia and Herzegovina

Timo Pekka Kivinen (born 8 December 1959) is a Finnish general who served as the Chief of Defence 2019–2024. Kivinen began his career as a dragoon, and was eventually promoted to brigade commander of the Karelia Brigade in 2011, Deputy chief of staff, Strategy in 2015 and Chief of Defence Command Finland in 2017.

== Career ==
Kivinen entered military service in the Finnish Army in 1977, and completed various courses at home and abroad, including the US Army Airborne and Ranger Courses in 1983, the Infantry Captain Course and the United Nation Staff Officer Course in Sweden in 1996, the International Visitors Programme in the US in 2003, the National Defence Course in 2006, the High Command Course in 2007 and the Flag Officers and Ambassadors Course, NATO Defence College 2012. He also studied at the National War College in 1991–1993 and in the Royal College of Defence Studies in the UK in 2008. He spent his junior years at the Uusimaa Jaeger Battalion, and was deployed in the Bosnian War as deputy commanding officer, Finnish Jaeger Battalion of the Stabilisation Force in Bosnia and Herzegovina (SFOR) in 1997. He also served as a defence attaché in Austria, Hungary and Ukraine from 1998 to 2001, and became the commander of the Utti Jaeger Regiment. He became the head of department and vice president, National Defence University from 2004 to 2007, became the assistant chief of staff, Plans and Policy Division, Defence Command 2009–2010, assistant chief of staff, Plans and Policy Division, Defence Command from 2009 to 2010, until he became the commander of the Karelia Brigade from 2011 to 2014, became the deputy chief of staff, strategy, from 2015 to 2017, became Chief of Defence Command Finland from 2017 to 2019, and became Chief of Defence on August 1, 2019, retiring from that role and from active service on 31 March 2024.

== Promotions ==
- First lieutenant 1982
- Senior lieutenant 1984
- Captain 1989
- Major 1992
- Lieutenant colonel 1998
- Colonel 2004
- Brigadier general 2010
- Major general 2014
- Lieutenant general 2016
- General 2019

== Honors ==
- Military Merits Medal (sotilasansiomitali)
- Commander, Order of the Lion of Finland
- 1st Class with Grand Star, Order of the Cross of Liberty
- NATO medal for the former Yugoslavia
- Order of the Polar Star

Military offices
Preceded by General Jarmo Lindberg	Chief of Defence; 2019–2024	Succeeded by General Janne Jaakkola
