= Ari Puheloinen =

Finnish General (born 1951)

Ari Tapani Puheloinen
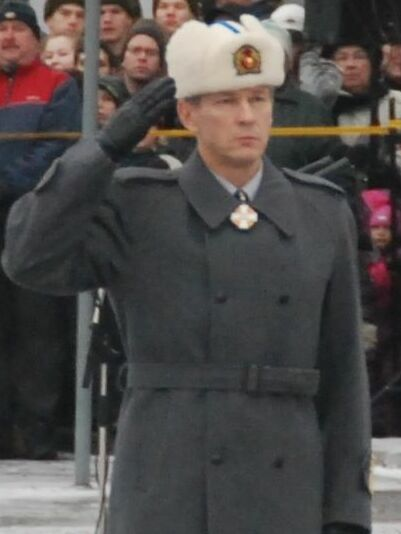
- Puheloinen in 2009
- Born: 26 December 1951 (age 74); Taipalsaari, Finland
- Military career
- Allegiance: Finland
- Branch: Finnish Army
- Service years: 1970–2014
- Rank: General
- Commands: battalion, Panssariprikaati (Armoured Brigade): 1993–1995; Panssariprikaati: 1999–2000; Itäinen maanpuolustusalue (Eastern Command): 2004-2007.
- Awards: 1st Class Commander, Order of the White Rose

Ari Tapani Puheloinen (born 26 December 1951) is a Finnish General who was Chief of Defence of the Finnish Defence Forces between 2009 and 2014.

Ari Puheloinen was born in Taipalsaari as the second son of the family of an electrician and a cleaner. Such working-class background is unusual for high-ranking Finnish officers, who usually come from middle-class or military families. For example, the fathers of the four preceding Finnish Chiefs of Defence have been either colonels, admirals, or generals. Later, the family moved from Savonia to Luumäki. Puheloinen's civilian education was accomplished in Taavetin lukio, where he graduated from in 1970.

After leaving secondary school, Puheloinen began his military career as a conscript in the Uudenmaan rakuunapataljoona in Lappeenranta, where he was trained as a reserve officer. After the statutory service period, he entered the military officer-training institution Kadettikoulu, although he had been admitted to both Helsinki School of Economics and University of Tampere. In 1974, Puheloinen graduated as a lieutenant and started service as a regular officer in the Armoured Brigade (Finnish: Panssariprikaati). In 1978, Puheloinen was selected to participate with three other Finnish officers in the five-month "Tactical Commander Course of Motorized Infantry Troops" in Soviet Union. Shortly thereafter, Puheloinen entered the Finnish Sotakorkeakoulu, the command college, which he graduated in 1983. After the command college, Puheloinen served for three years as an intelligence officer in the Finnish Defence Staff, specializing in eastern affairs. This was followed by a tour of duty as an assistant military attaché in Moscow at the end of the cold war, until 1990.

Puheloinen returned to Finland in 1990 and was selected to command a battalion in the Armoured Brigade in 1993, as his first command assignment. In 1995, Puheloinen served a tour of duty in the Organization for Security and Co-operation in Europe (OSCE) headquarters, and then returned to Finnish Defence Staff to work on starting the Finnish cooperation with NATO. This was followed by a study period as a Fellow at Harvard University. In 1999, Puheloinen assumed the command of Armoured Brigade. After 2000, Puheloinen worked for three years as the Readiness Chief of the Defence Staff and from 2004 to 2007 as the commander of the Finnish Eastern Command (Finnish: Itäinen maanpuolustusalue), a regional command entity responsible for the Defence of Eastern Finland. During this time, he was also responsible for the reorganization of the Finnish Army. From 2007 to 2009 Puheloinen was the Chief of Defence Staff, the second-in-command of the Defence Forces. At the same time, he married a career officer, 1st lieutenant Tiina Laisi-Puheloinen, his second wife.

The selection of Puheloinen as the next Finnish Chief of Defence was announced on 23 January 2009. He succeeded Admiral Juhani Kaskeala on 1 August 2009. He retired in 2014 and was succeeded by Jarmo Lindberg. — In 2023, Puheloinen published his memoirs, Sotilas ja työmies.

== Honors ==
- Order of the White Rose of Finland (Finland)
- Order of the Lion of Finland (Finland)
- Military merit medal (Finland)
- Royal Norwegian Order of Merit (Norway, 2012)

Military offices
Preceded by Admiral Juhani Kaskeala	Chief of Defence; 2009–2014	Succeeded by General Jarmo Lindberg
