= Jaakko Valtanen =

Finnish general (1925–2024)

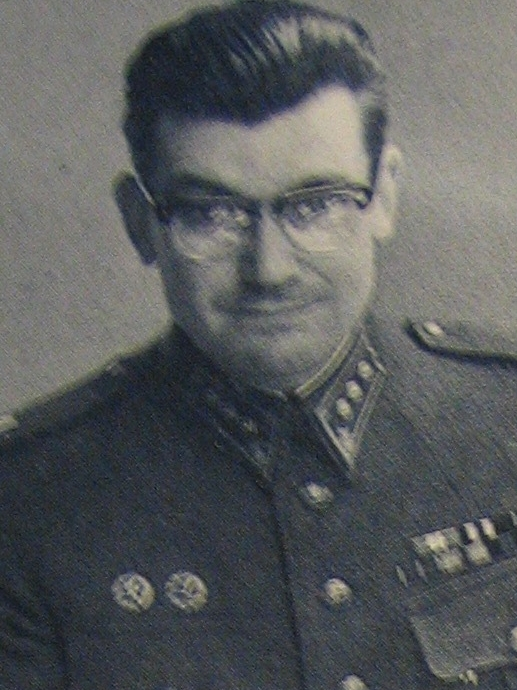
- Valtanen in 1960
- Born: 9 February 1925; Hämeenlinnan maalaiskunta, Finland
- Died: 17 January 2024 (aged 98); Kauniainen, Finland
- Military career
- Allegiance: Finland
- Branch: Finnish Army
- Service years: 1939–1990
- Rank: General
- Conflicts: World War II; Continuation War

Jaakko Valtanen (9 February 1925 – 17 January 2024) was a Finnish general. He was the Chief of Defence of the Finnish Defence Forces from 1983 to 1990. He was the last Finnish Chief of Defence to have served in the Continuation War. He was the first guest to greet the President of Finland in the annual Independence Day Receptions from 2016 until his death. Valtanen died in Kauniainen on 17 January 2024, at the age of 98.

Military offices
Preceded by General Lauri Sutela	Chief of Defence; 1983–1990	Succeeded by General Jan Klenberg
