= Gustav Hägglund =

Chief of Defence of the Finnish Defence Forces (born 1938)

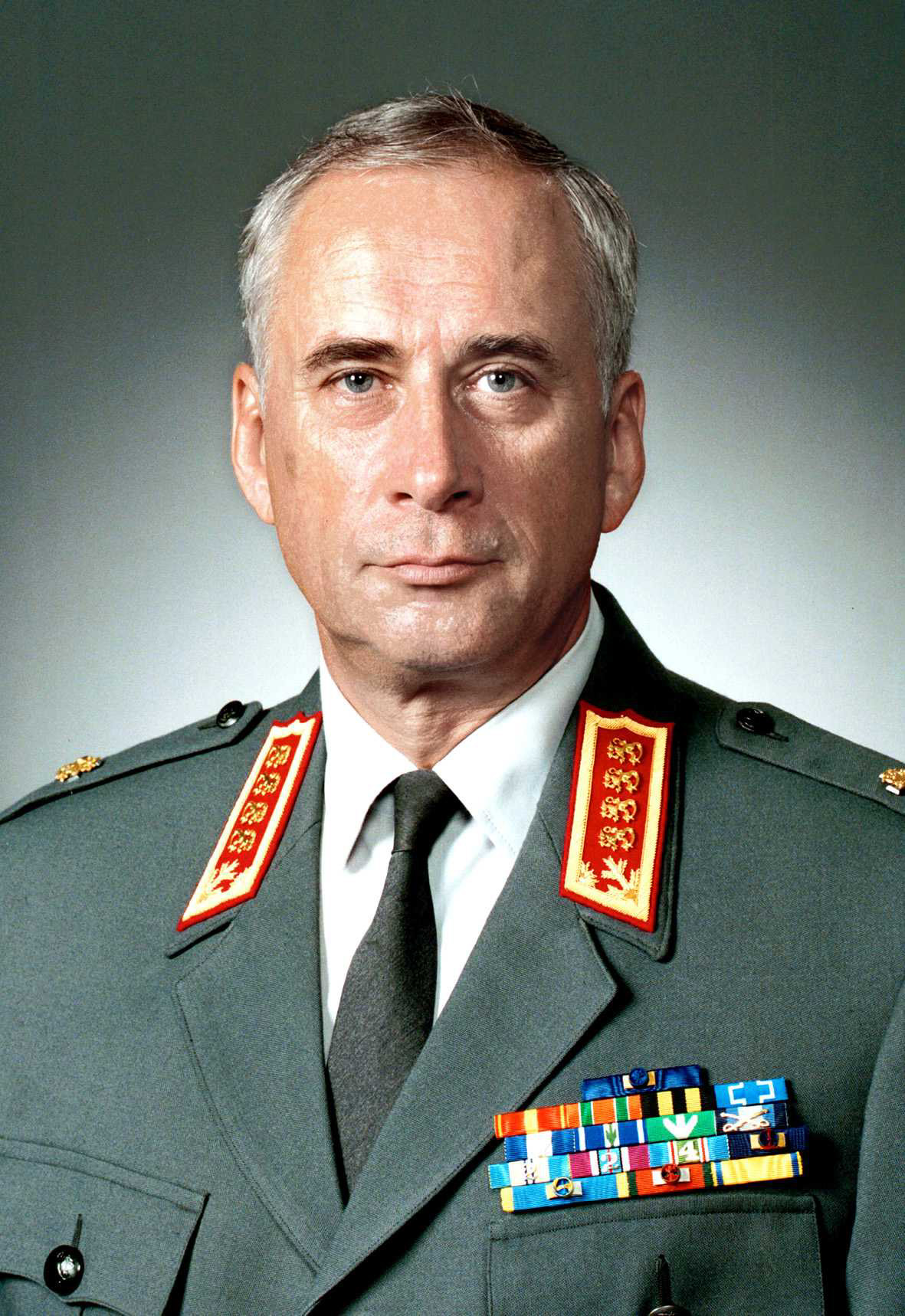
- Born: Johan Edvin Birger Gustav Hägglund; 6 September 1938 (age 88); Viipuri, Finland (now Vyborg, Russia)
- Relatives: Woldemar Hägglund (father)
- Military career
- Allegiance: Finland
- Branch: Finnish Army
- Service years: 1958–2001
- Rank: General
- Commands: UNIFIL; Chief of Defence
- Conflicts: Arab–Israeli conflict (1978); Israeli–Lebanese conflict (1986–88)

Johan Edvin Birger Gustav Hägglund (born 6 September 1938) is a retired general of Finland. He was the Chief of Defence 1994–2001, and Chairman of the European Union Military Committee 2001–2004.

== Life and career ==
Johan Edvin Birger Gustav Hägglund was born in Viipuri, Finland on 6 September 1938 to a Swedish-speaking family. Hägglund's father was General Woldemar Hägglund, commander of the Karelian Front in the Second World War. He was born in Viipuri, an area ceded to the Soviet Union in the Second World War. Despite his Swedish-speaking family background, Finnish language immersion was total in his youth, and he ultimately had to learn Swedish at school. Hägglund went to Svenska normallyceum i Helsingfors and was then educated not only at the Cadet School in Finland, but also at the United States Army Command and General Staff College in Leavenworth, Kansas. He is also a fellow of Harvard University.

Hägglund commanded United Nations troops in 1978–1979 as the commander of the Finnish battalion (FINBATT) in UNEF II in Sinai, as the commander of UNDOF in Golan in 1985–1986, and as the commander of UNIFIL in Southern Lebanon in 1986–88.

Hägglund served under Presidents Martti Ahtisaari and briefly under Tarja Halonen. Hägglund's command of the defence forces was characterised by the general modernisation of the force and refocusing from quantity to quality. In the Army, three large "readiness brigades" were formed, and the Air Force upgraded to Hornet F/A-18 fighters. Finland entered NATO's Partnership for Peace programme under Hägglund's command.

A major change was made in terms of conscription service: reserve officers and NCOs would serve 12 months (lengthened from 11 months), but rank and file would serve 6 months (shortened from 8 months), with some specialists such as military police serving 9 months. Previously the rotation had been thrice per year, in order to maintain a contingent that had been trained at least 4 months. The rotation was changed to twice per year.

Within the military, Hägglund was also a strong proponent of peacekeeping operations, worked to improve their appreciation and opined that officers should necessarily participate. Since Finnish law requires that all participants be volunteers, this brought him into conflict with the officers' union, whose opinion was that peacekeeping experience could not be a requirement for career advancement.

Officer training went through a major improvement due to his actions. The cadet school was promoted to university status as the Finnish National Defence University, and degrees were formalised.

Hägglund has published three books, one concerning the defence of Finland, one about the defence of Europe and an autobiography. In the 2000s, Hägglund promoted the development of the independent defence of Europe, and took the view that the United States would shift its focus away from Europe, changing the role of NATO.

Military offices
Preceded by Carl-Gustaf Ståhl	United Nations Disengagement Observer Force (UNDOF); June 1985–May 1988	Succeeded by Gustaf Welin
Preceded by William O'Callaghan	United Nations Interim Force in Lebanon (UNIFIL); June 1986–June 1988	Succeeded by Lars-Eric Wahlgren
Preceded by Admiral Jan Klenberg	Chief of Defence; 1994–2001	Succeeded by Admiral Juhani Kaskeala
Preceded by first in office	Chairman of the European Union Military Committee; 2001-2004	Succeeded by General Rolando Mosca Moschini
