= Aarne Sihvo =

Finnish general and Chief of Defence (1889–1963)

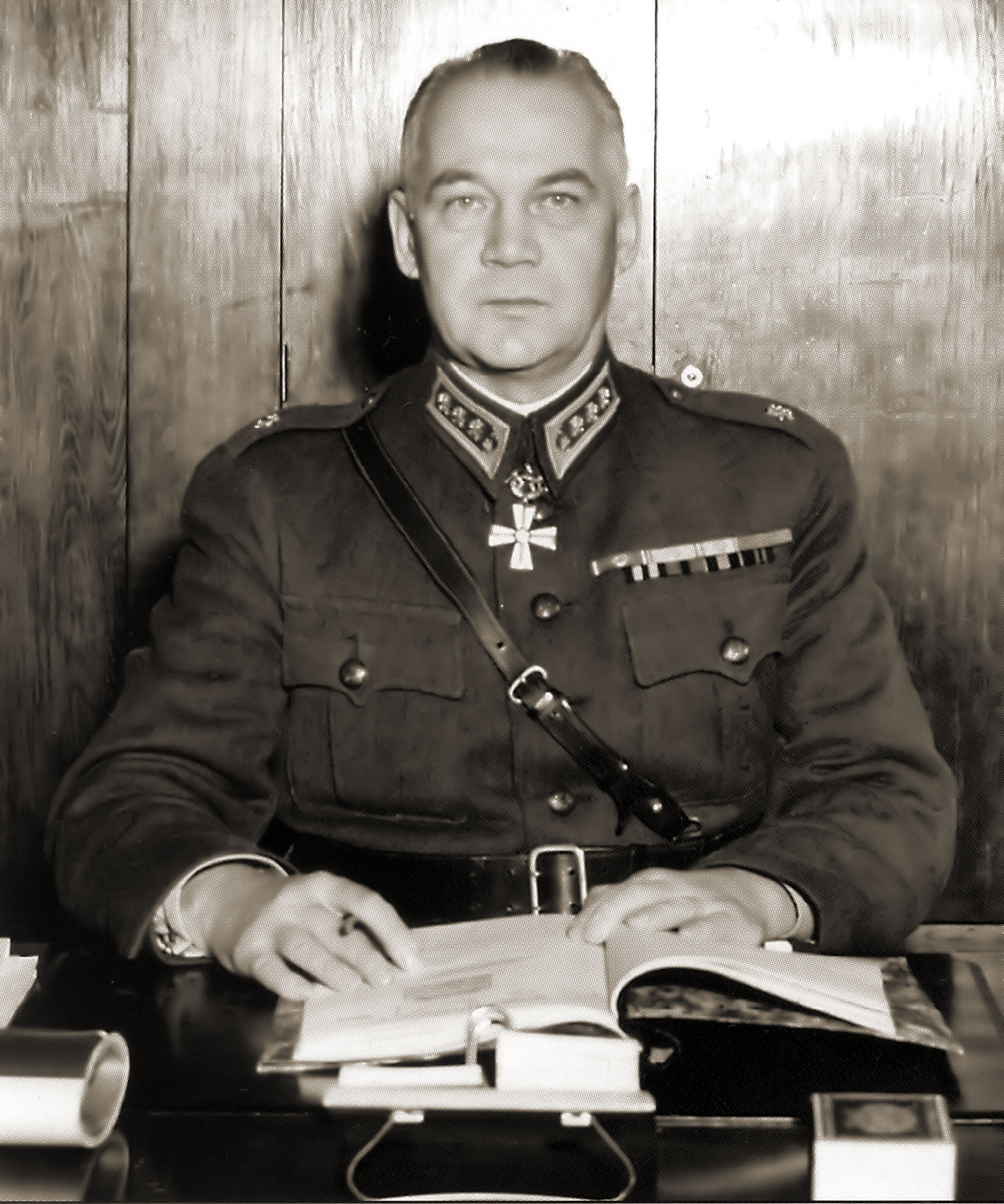
- Aarne Sihvo
- Born: 22 November 1889; Virolahti, Viipuri Province, Grand Duchy of Finland
- Died: 12 June 1963 (aged 73); Helsinki, Finland
- Military career
- Allegiance: Finland
- Service years: 1918–1953
- Rank: General
- Commands: Chief of Defence
- Conflicts: Finnish Civil War; World War II; Winter War; Continuation War
- Awards: Order of Lāčplēsis, 2nd class (Latvian)

Aarne Sihvo (22 November 1889 – 12 June 1963) was a Finnish general and politician.

== Biography ==
Sihvo was born in Virolahti to a family of school teachers: Antti Adolf Sihvo and Minna Elisabeth Nyman. He graduated from high school in 1910 and began studying medicine at the University of Helsinki.

In 1915 he moved to Germany where he started his military education as part of the Jäger movement. His time as a Jäger was unusually eventful, including recruitment and espionage trips to Finland and a period as a so-called "cage Jäger" imprisoned in the Spalernaya prison in St Petersburg.

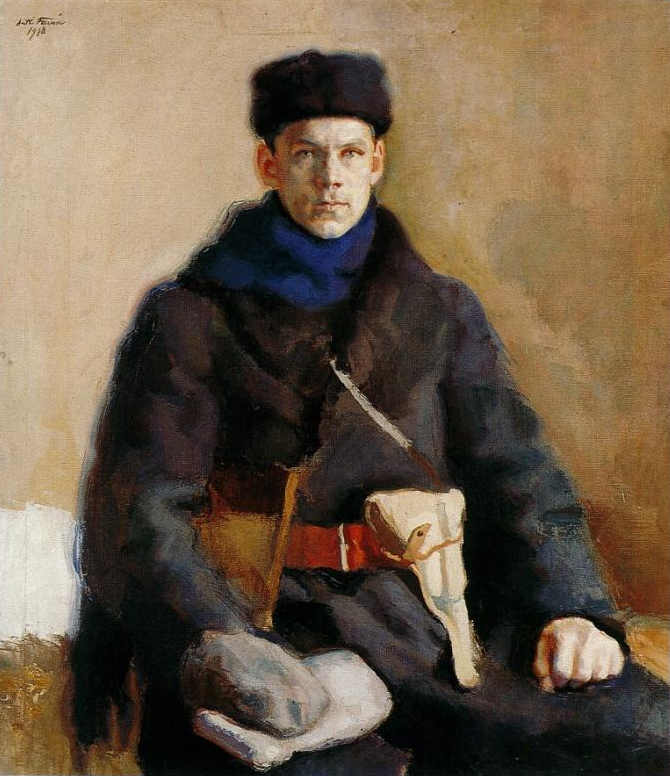
Portrait by Antti Favén in 1918

During the Finnish Civil War in 1918 Aarne commanded the front in Karelia between Saimen and Ladoga Lake. His military operations as a part of the Karelian Army concluded to holding a position south of Vuoksen. His youth, his background as a Jäger and his speaking Finnish made him an alternative to Gustaf Mannerheim. But despite his successful initial career he left the Army in 1918 because he couldn't come to terms with German orientation. He was an adherent of Republic unlike with many advocates of monarchy of his country.

Aarne Sihvo had run as a candidate for parliamentary elections in 1919 as a member of the National Progressive Party and won the majority of votes in his district. He was a member of the Parliament of Finland from 1919 to 1920, representing the National Progressive Party.

He was the Chief of Defence of the Finnish Defence Forces from 1926 to 1933. In the early 1930s he became the most prominent opponent of right-wing radicalism within the Finnish military leadership. His uncompromising stance toward the Mäntsälä rebellion of 1932 — in which he advocated firm measures against the pro-Lapua Civil Guard members who defied the government — brought him into conflict with the Civil Guard leadership and with Mannerheim, and he was dismissed from his command in early 1933.

After serving as inspector of the armed forces from 1933 to 1938 and as commander of anti-aircraft forces during the Continuation War, Sihvo was appointed Chief of Defence for a second time in 1946, serving until 1953. In this role he steered the Finnish Defence Forces toward the line of President J. K. Paasikivi, participating in the elaboration of the Finnish-Soviet VSB treaty and attending the Paris Peace Conference as a military expert.

Sihvo was a recipient of the Latvian military Order of Lāčplēsis, 2nd class.

Sihvo died aged 73 in Helsinki. He is buried in the Hietaniemi Cemetery in Helsinki.

Military offices
Preceded by General K. F. Wilkama	Chief of Defence; 1926–1933	Succeeded by Lieutenant General Hugo Österman
Preceded by Lieutenant General Jarl Lundqvist	Chief of Defence; 1946–1953	Succeeded by General Kaarlo Heiskanen
