= Lauri Sutela =

Finnish military officer

- Born: 11 October 1918; Äänekoski, Finland
- Died: 8 November 2011 (aged 93); Helsinki, Finland
- Military career
- Allegiance: Finland
- Branch: Finnish Army
- Service years: 1939–1983
- Rank: General
- Unit: 12th Jager Engineer Regiment.
- Commands: Chief of Defence
- Conflicts: World War II; Winter War; Continuation War

General Lauri Johannes Sutela (11 October 1918, Äänekoski – 8 November 2011; surname until 1929 Schroderus) was a Finnish military officer. He served as an officer in the engineer corps during World War II.

Sutela worked his way up the Finnish Army and finally became the Chief of Defence from 15 April 1974 until 11 October 1983. His appointment was controversial since he was the first (and last) non-combat arms officer to be appointed as the Chief of Defence, but he was appointed solely based on seniority. He was considered to be acceptable and a consensus candidate to both Sweden, Soviet Union, West Germany and East Germany, i.e. the main foreign players with influence in the Finnish defence establishment. As a Staff Colonel in the early-to-mid 1960s, he had authored several books on doctrine and tactics on how to adapt Soviet weapons systems to Western/Finnish doctrine and tactics.

== Death ==
Sutela died in Helsinki, Finland on 8 November 2011 at the age of 93. He is buried in the Hietaniemi Cemetery in Helsinki.

Military offices
| Preceded by General Kaarlo Leinonen | Chief of Defence; 1974–1983 | Succeeded by General Jaakko Valtanen |
