= Jan Klenberg =

Finnish admiral (1931–2020)

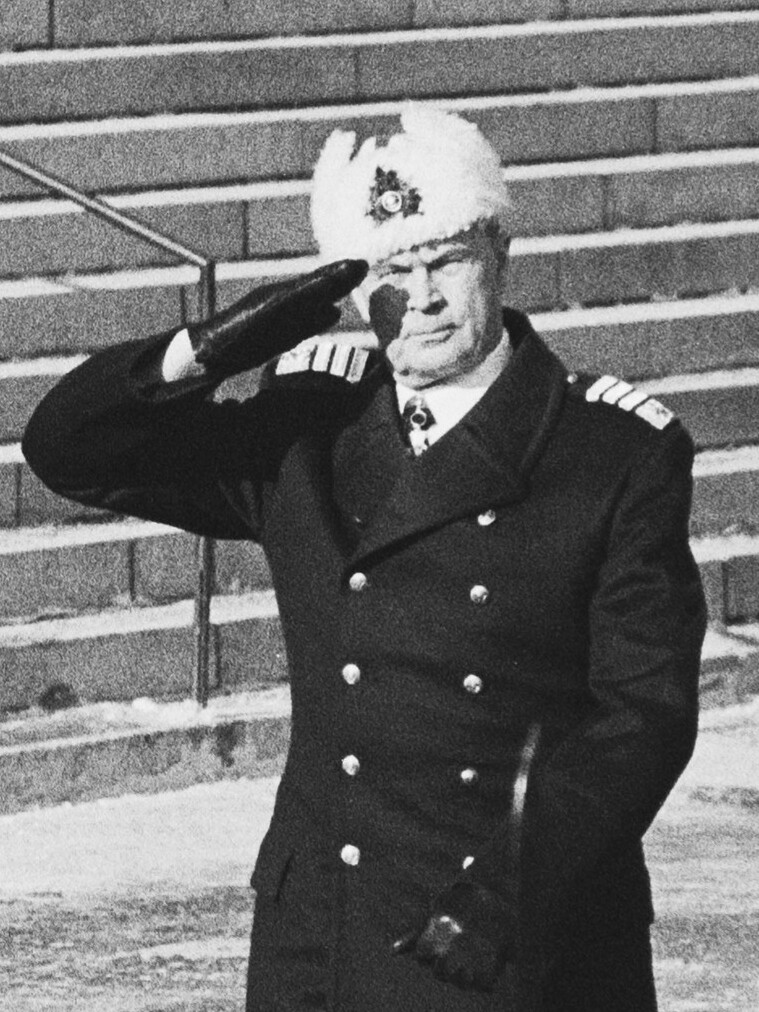
- Klenberg in 1994
- Born: October 22, 1931
- Died: August 28, 2020 (aged 88)
- Military career
- Allegiance: Finland
- Branch: Finnish Defence Forces
- Commands: Chief of Defence

Jan Gottfrid Klenberg (22 October 1931 – 28 August 2020) was a Finnish admiral. He was born in Mikkeli. He served as Chief of Defence of the Finnish Defence Forces between 1990 and 1994. Klenberg was the first navy officer in that position.

Military offices
Preceded by General Jaakko Valtanen	Chief of Defence; 1990–1994	Succeeded by General Gustav Hägglund
