= Juhani Kaskeala =

Finnish admiral (b. 1946)

Pauli Juhani Kaskeala
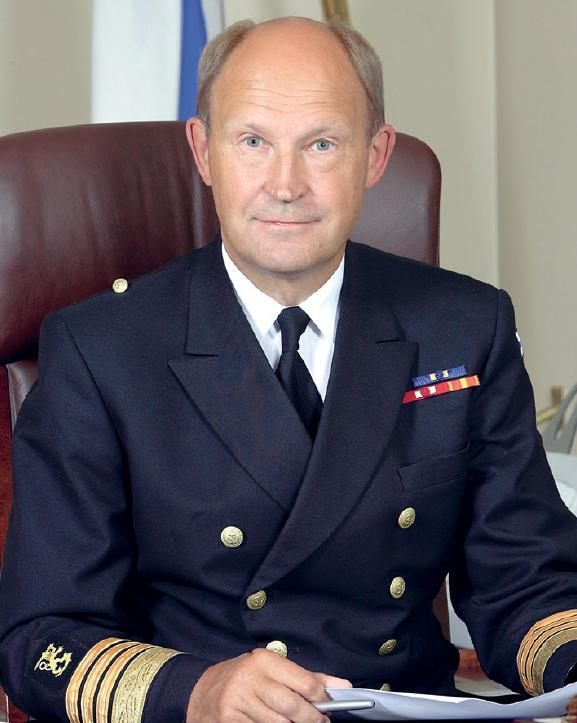
- Born: 26 July 1946 (age 80); Kuopio, Finland
- Military career
- Allegiance: Finland
- Branch: Finnish Navy
- Service years: 1965–2009
- Rank: Admiral

Admiral Pauli Juhani Kaskeala (born 26 July 1946, Kuopio) is a senior Finnish admiral and was Chief of Defence of the Finnish Defence Forces from 2001 to 1 August 2009.

In 1982, Kaskeala was appointed as Third Aide-de-Camp to the President of the Republic, Mauno Koivisto, eventually serving as First Aide-de-Camp from 1987.

From 1989 to 1991, he was commander of a missile squadron in the Coastal Fleet. Kaskeala was then a military attaché in London, The Hague and Brussels between 1991 and 1994, before serving as principal secretary to the Defence Council 1994–1997, and as Commander of the Turku And Pori Military Province 1997–1998.

He served as Director General for Defence Policy at Finland's Ministry of Defence from 1998 to 2001, and was then the Finnish Military Representative to the EU and NATO in Brussels, before being appointed Chief of Defence on 4 June 2001.

Kaskeala resigned from the Finnish Ships' Officers' Association in 2005 after an incident involving a search by the government.

In 2006, Kaskeala was chosen as the most positive person of the year because of his work to improve Finland and its interest, while still showing a "positive attitude and bright character".

Military offices
Preceded by General Gustav Hägglund	Chief of Defence; 2001–2009	Succeeded by General Ari Puheloinen
