= Karl Fredrik Wilkama =

Finnish military officer

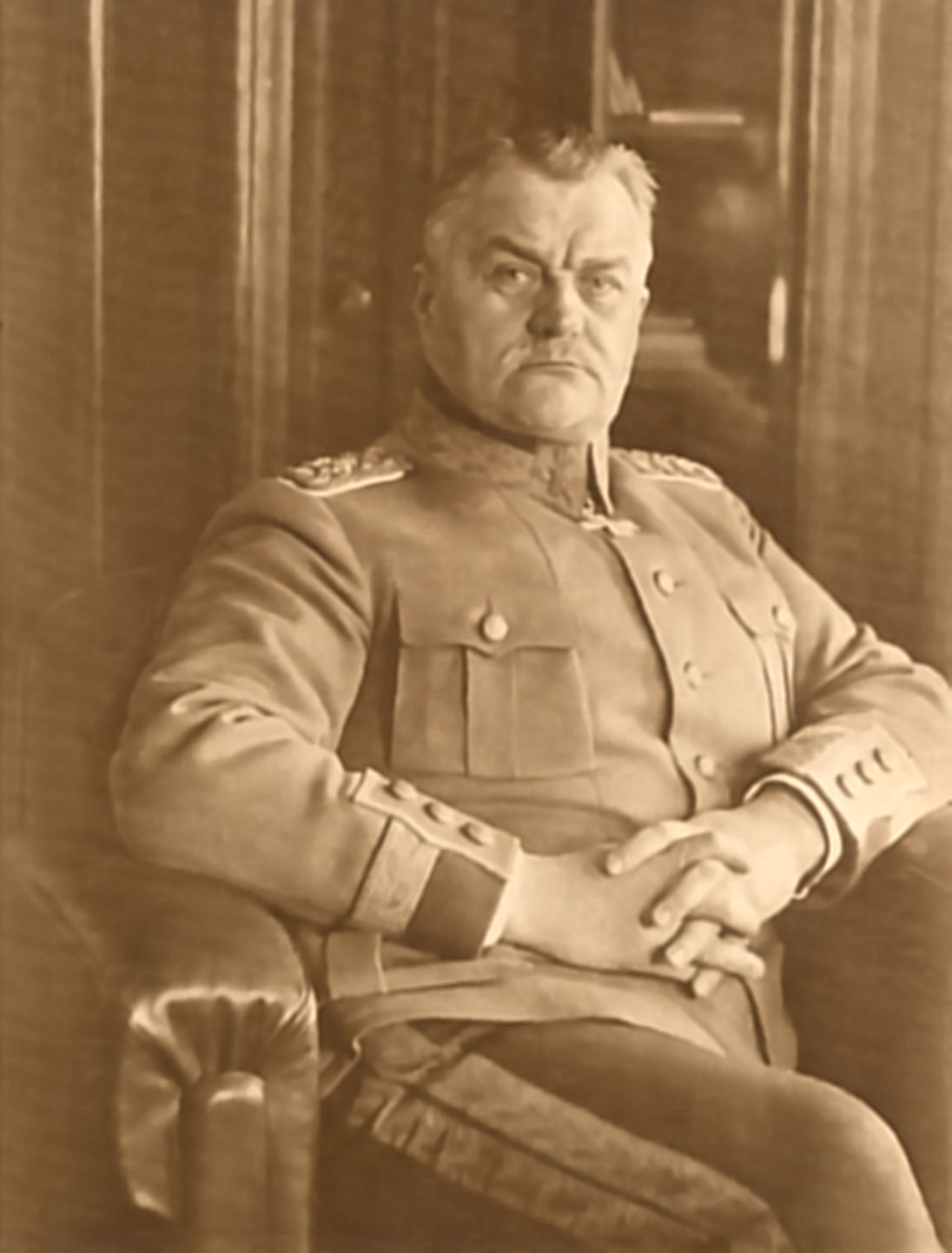
- Born: Karl Fredrik Wilkman; 27 March 1876; Helsinki, Grand Duchy of Finland, Russian Empire
- Died: 15 July 1947 (aged 71); Helsinki, Finland
- Military career
- Allegiance: Russia (1899–1917); Finland (1918–1944)
- Branch: Imperial Russian Army; White Guard; Finnish Army
- Service years: 1899–1944
- Rank: General of the Infantry
- Conflicts: Finnish Civil War; World War II; Winter War; Continuation War

Karl Fredrik Wilkama (27 March 1876 – 15 July 1947), born Wilkman, was a Finnish General of the Infantry. He was the supreme commander of the Finnish Defence Forces.

Wilkama became an officer in the Imperial Russian Army in 1899. According to the records, he started his military career on 30 May 1889, when he was only 13.

Wilkama was appointed General Major on 12 April 1918. He initially commanded the Finnish Eastern Army.

Major General Wilkama was appointed Commander-in-chief of the Finnish Army on 31 May 1918, when General of the Cavalry Mannerheim was granted leave from his position. However, Wilkama only held his position for 2½ months (until 13 August 1918). He resigned from the army on 18 June 1919, but he was reappointed Commander-in-chief between 12 September 1919 – 7 August 1924. He was promoted to Lieutenant General on 16 May 1922.

His third period as Commander-in-chief began on 2 October 1925 and he retired on 22 May 1926. He became a general of the infantry on May 16, 1928. He served on special positions in the Finnish Headquarters during the Winter War and the Continuation War.

Wilkama is recipient of the Latvian military Order of Lāčplēsis, 2nd class.
