= Hotel McAlpin =

Residential building in Manhattan, New York

Herald Towers
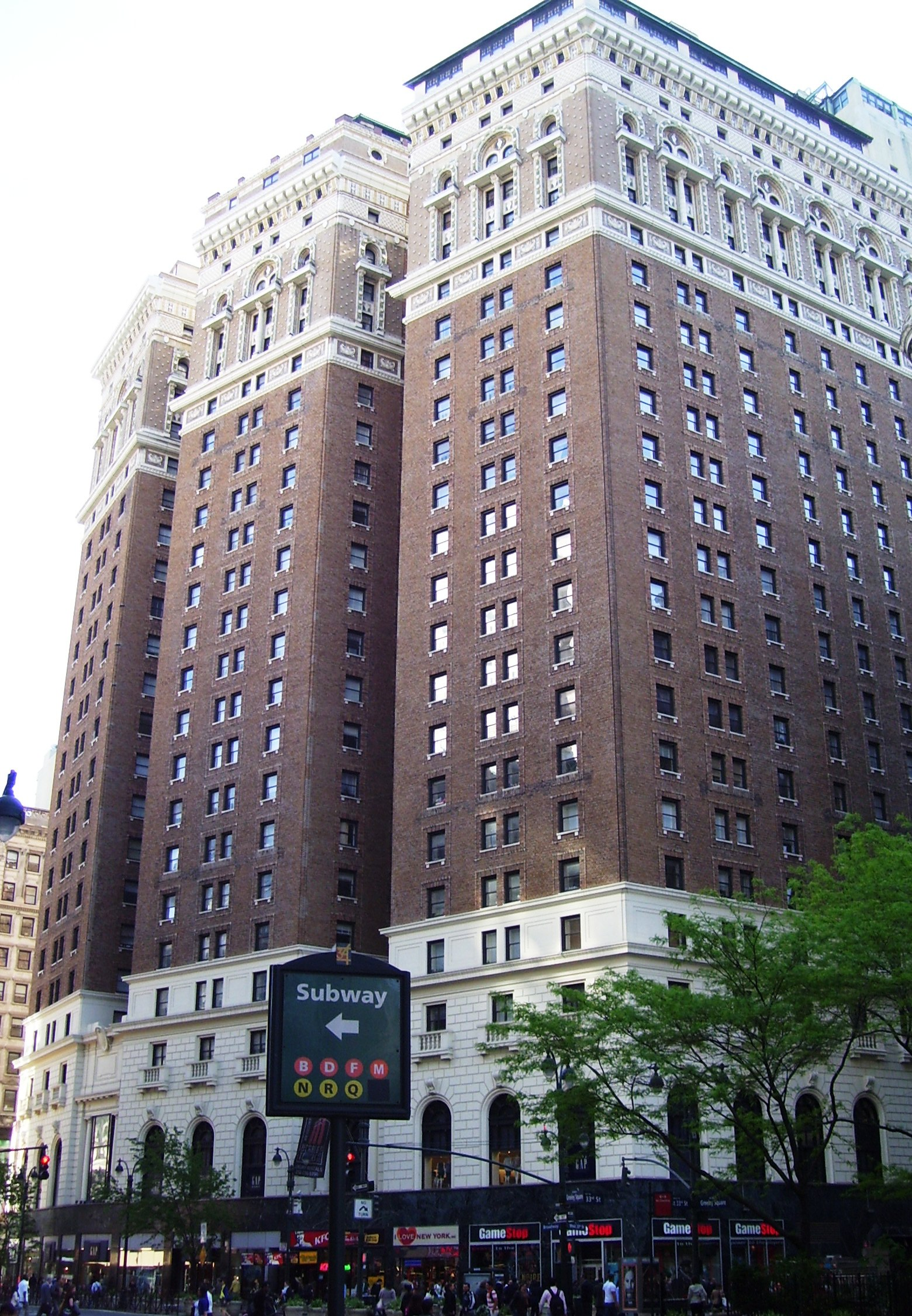
- The hotel building as seen in 2011
- Former names: Hotel McAlpin

General information
- Location: 1282–1300 Broadway; Manhattan, New York
- Coordinates: 40°44′57″N 73°59′16″W
- Construction started: 1911
- Completed: 1912

Height
- Height: 308 feet (94 m)

Technical details
- Floor count: 25

Design and construction
- Architect: Frank Mills Andrews

Herald Towers, formerly the Hotel McAlpin, is a residential condominium building on Herald Square, along Broadway between 33rd and 34th Streets, in the Midtown Manhattan neighborhood of New York City. Constructed from 1910 to 1912 by the Greeley Square Hotel Company, it operated as a short-term hotel until 1976. The building was designed by Frank Mills Andrews in the Italian Renaissance style and was the largest hotel in the world at the time of its completion, with 1,500 guestrooms. The hotel was expanded in 1917, when Warren and Wetmore designed an annex with 200 rooms.

The building is 390 feet (120 m) high and has 25 above-ground stories and four basement levels. It is divided into three wings facing Broadway and Sixth Avenue and is largely clad in brick, limestone, and terracotta. The hotel building contains 13,000 short tons (12,000 long tons; 12,000 t) of structural steel as well as an extensive system of mechanical equipment. Originally, the hotel included a triple-height lobby clad in marble and stone, as well as various public rooms in the Renaissance and Louis XVI styles. In the hotel's basement was the Marine Grill, which could fit 250 people. On the upper stories, two floors were set aside for men and women. The top floor had men's baths and a ballroom. In the late 1970s, the hotel was converted into about 690 apartments.

The Greeley Square Hotel Company operated the hotel for two decades and refurbished it in 1928. The hotel was sold in 1936 and refurbished the following year; the New York Life Insurance Company then resold the McAlpin to Joseph Levy in 1945. The hotel was managed by the Knott hotel chain from 1938 to 1952, when the Tisch Organization took over operation. Levy sold the hotel to Sheraton Hotels in 1954 and it was renamed the Sheraton-McAlpin. Following a renovation in 1959, the hotel became the Sheraton-Atlantic Hotel in 1959. Sol Goldman and Alexander DiLorenzo bought the hotel in 1968, restoring the hotel's original name. Sheraton reacquired the hotel in 1976 and resold it to developer William Zeckendorf Jr., who converted the McAlpin to 700 rental apartments. The building reopened in 1980 as the McAlpin House. The McAlpin was renamed Herald Towers in 1999 and was converted to condominiums in the 2000s.

== Site ==
The McAlpin Hotel is on the eastern side of Greeley Square, south of Herald Square, in the Koreatown and Midtown South neighborhoods of Manhattan in New York City, United States. It has addresses at 1300 Broadway and 50 West 34th Street. The building has a frontage along Broadway to the west, 33rd Street to the north, and 32nd Street to the south. The hotel was built on lots at West 33rd and 32nd Streets, and also the northeast corner of Broadway and 32nd Street. The irregularly shaped land lot covers 19,975 square feet (1,855.7 m^{2}), with a frontage of 93.17 feet (28 m) on Broadway and a depth of 122.83 feet (37.44 m) between 33rd and 34th Streets. The property is identified on the Manhattan tax map as Block 834, Lot 11. The hotel comprises two 17-story structures on Broadway and 32nd Street, as well as a six-story wing on 33rd Street.

The building shares the city block with the Hotel Pierrepont and the Hotel at Fifth Avenue (the former Aberdeen Hotel) to the east. Other nearby structures include the Empire State Building to the northeast, Herald Towers to the north, Macy's Herald Square to the northwest, Manhattan Mall to the west, and the former Grand Hotel and the Hotel Wolcott one block south. There were once several department stores to the west, while there are office and hotel buildings to the east. To the south are other former hotels including the Gilsey House and Grand Hotel. The 12-story, 165-room Hotel Alcazar at one time adjoined the Hotel Martinique on the north side of 34th Street, east of Broadway. The Martinique also wrapped around a 20-story hotel at the southeast corner of Broadway and 33rd Street. An entrance to the New York City Subway's 34th Street–Herald Square station and to the PATH system's adjacent 33rd Street station is directly outside the hotel, within Greeley Square.

== Architecture ==
Herald Towers was designed by architect Frank Mills Andrews, who was also president of the Greeley Square Hotel Company, the hotel's developer. It was designed in the Italian Renaissance style. Between 1915 and 1917, the hotel was expanded east to designs by Warren and Wetmore. The hotel's original owners cited the McAlpin as being 26 stories tall, (Note: Architecture and Building 1913, p. 43, cites the hotel as having 24 stories, in addition to two mezzanines. The same source cites the hotel as having one basement, two sub-basements, and a basement mezzanine.) although other sources gave a height of 25 stories. The roof is 390 feet (120 m) above the curb. The hotel also had four basement levels, three of which were full stories; these extended 60 feet (18 m) below ground.

The building is divided into three wings facing Broadway and Sixth Avenue, with light courts between each wing. The base is clad with Bedford limestone, while the main shaft of the building contains a facade of orange brick. There were originally iron and terracotta balconies in front of many of the windows. The top stories contain a facade of orange brick and terracotta, with intricate decorations. There are multi-story arched openings on the top several stories, above which are a terracotta cornice and attic. Fiske and Company Inc. manufactured most of the brick, while Michael Cohen and Co. made the limestone.

=== Mechanical features ===
The building uses 13,000 short tons (12,000 long tons; 12,000 t) of structural steel. The foundations consist of concrete footings, built atop a layer of solid rock. Some of the columns in the superstructure are placed extremely close to the lot line, so girders are used to distribute the weight of the columns across multiple footers. The columns at the building's corners are placed atop cantilevered girders. At the end of each wing is an enclosed emergency stair that runs the full height of the building. Stairways were also placed next to the service elevators along 33rd Street, as well as next to the public elevators at the core of the building. As a fireproofing measure, the hotel's doors and trim were all made of hollow steel, and each floor contained five standpipes.

The first basement level connected to the New York City Subway at 34th Street–Herald Square and to the Hudson & Manhattan Railroad's Uptown Hudson Tubes (now PATH) at 33rd Street. There were also a ratskeller (later the Marine Grill), kitchen, servants' rooms, service entrance, and receiving room on the first basement level. The other basement levels included stewards' departments, mechanical equipment, and an in-house laundry. There was also a wine cellar, as well as humidors for cigars.

The hotel's sub-basement contained power generators with a capacity of 2,400 horsepower (1,800 kW), as well as two icemakers that could create up to 10 tons of ice per day. The hotel had 13 elevators, which traveled at 600 feet per minute (180 m/min) and could carry up to 20 people each, as well as three sidewalk lifts. The hotel's mechanical system included 7 miles (11 km) of heating ducts, 115 miles (185 km) of electric wires, and 3.25 miles (5.23 km) of tubes. When the hotel was under construction in 1911, one source described its 30-by-120-foot (9.1 by 36.6 m) telephone switchboard equipment as the largest in any hotel. There were three switchboards with 100 trunk lines and 1,800 stations, which could accommodate 500,000 calls per day at the time of the McAlpin's opening. In addition, the hotel contained 16 telautograph machines. Servants communicated using a telephone system with 17 stations.

=== Public rooms ===
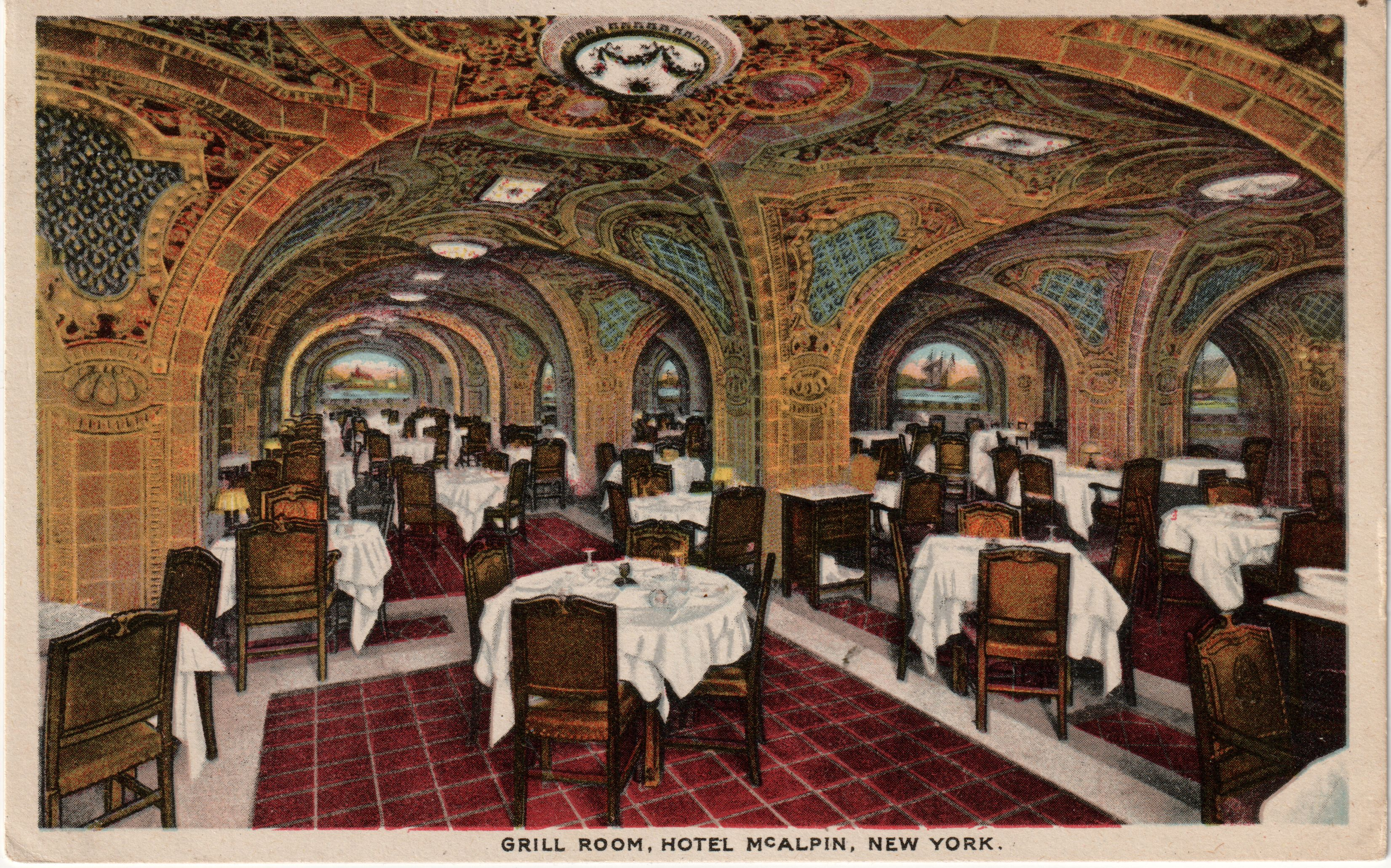
Grill room, Hotel McAlpin, New York, circa 1930s

When the hotel was built, the Real Estate Record and Guide wrote that the design of the base "marks a distinct departure from the established New York type of hostelry", in that the dining rooms and restaurants were placed one story above ground level. This allowed the hotel's proprietors to maximize its retail space by placing shops on three sides of the ground level, while also retaining sufficient space on the ground story for a large lobby.

==== Ground level ====
The ground story was largely devoted to retail. The main entrance was from 34th Street; there was a women's reception room to the left (east) of the main entrance. The main lobby, a three-story space, was clad in marble and Caen stone and was designed in the Italian Renaissance style. It measured 64 by 96 feet (20 by 29 m) wide and 50 feet (15 m) tall. The space could be accessed from Broadway, 33rd Street, and 34th Street. The reception desk was made of marble, and near the reception desk was a maids' signal board, which showed whether a certain room was being cleaned. The western side of the lobby contained a bronze railing, behind which were the cashier, room clerk, key clerk, information desk, and other departments. The lobby also had leather seats, marble pedestals, vases, and other decorations. The lobby's ceiling contained three red-and-gold chandeliers. The lobby was surrounded by sixteen marble columns, twelve of which were light-golden veined Famosa and four of which were light Bongard. The columns formed an arcade of arches, the tops of which contained lunettes with eight murals by T. Gilbert White.

West of the central lobby, facing Broadway, was a men's restaurant designed in a 15th-century Italian Gothic style. The men's restaurant had a low vaulted ceiling and was sparsely decorated. The walls were wainscoted with square and rhombus-shaped wooden panels. The cornice contained a gilded frieze made of carved wood; the frieze contained the coats of arms of various 15th-century Italian families. The columns in the men's restaurant contained niches with carved wooden figures, which represented 15th- and 16th-century Italian decorations.

==== Upper stories ====
A gallery surrounded the lobby at mezzanine level, which was 17 feet (5.2 m) above ground. The mezzanine level contained a "tapestry gallery" decorated with tapestries by Albert Herter. The tapestries, which were colored blue and ocher, varied in size from 7 by 6 feet (2.1 by 1.8 m) to 33 by 7 feet (10.1 by 2.1 m). They were disassembled in the 1930s and reinstalled at the Armenian Sisters Academy in Radnor, Pennsylvania, during the 1970s. Corridors surrounded the lobby on both the first story and the mezzanine level. The ceilings of each corridor contained gold decorations with red and blue accents.

The dining room, banquet room, women's restaurant, reception room, writing room, and library were on the mezzanine level. The dining room measured 63 by 145 feet (19 by 44 m) across and 25 feet (7.6 m) high and was designed in the French Renaissance style. The dining room included gilded decorations, mirrored panels, and damask tapestries on its walls; cream-and-gold decorations on the ceiling; and crystal chandeliers. On Broadway was a banquet hall with a vaulted ceiling, measuring 80 by 32 feet (24.4 by 9.8 m) across. The banquet hall was decorated in green and gold, and it contained murals on its ceiling. The south side of the hotel contained a women's tea room and restaurant, measuring 65 by 30 feet (19.8 by 9.1 m), and a women's reception room, measuring 30 by 30 feet (9.1 by 9.1 m). These two rooms were colored gray and blue. The women's restaurant, an irregularly shaped space at the southeast corner of the mezzanine, was decorated with blue tapestries and carved capitals. There was also a library measuring 30 by 45 feet (9.1 by 13.7 m) on the east side of the mezzanine. These rooms were designed in the Renaissance style, except the women's rooms, which were in the Louis XVI style.

The second floor included a men's lounge and private dining rooms. The men's lounge measured 65 by 96 feet (20 by 29 m). During the mid-1910s expansion, a children's play area was added to the sixth floor. The hotel had a medical clinic on its 23rd story. The top floor had men's baths and a ballroom. The baths included a Victorian-style Turkish bath, a Russian bath, an outdoor lounge, and a swimming pool made of enameled brick. Fifty additional dressing rooms were added next to the Turkish bath in the 1910s. The ballroom, designed in a Renaissance style, measured 46 by 84 feet (14 by 26 m) across and 25 feet (7.6 m) high. By 1970, the upper stories contained an off-Broadway theater, the McAlpin Roof Theater.

==== Marine Grill ====
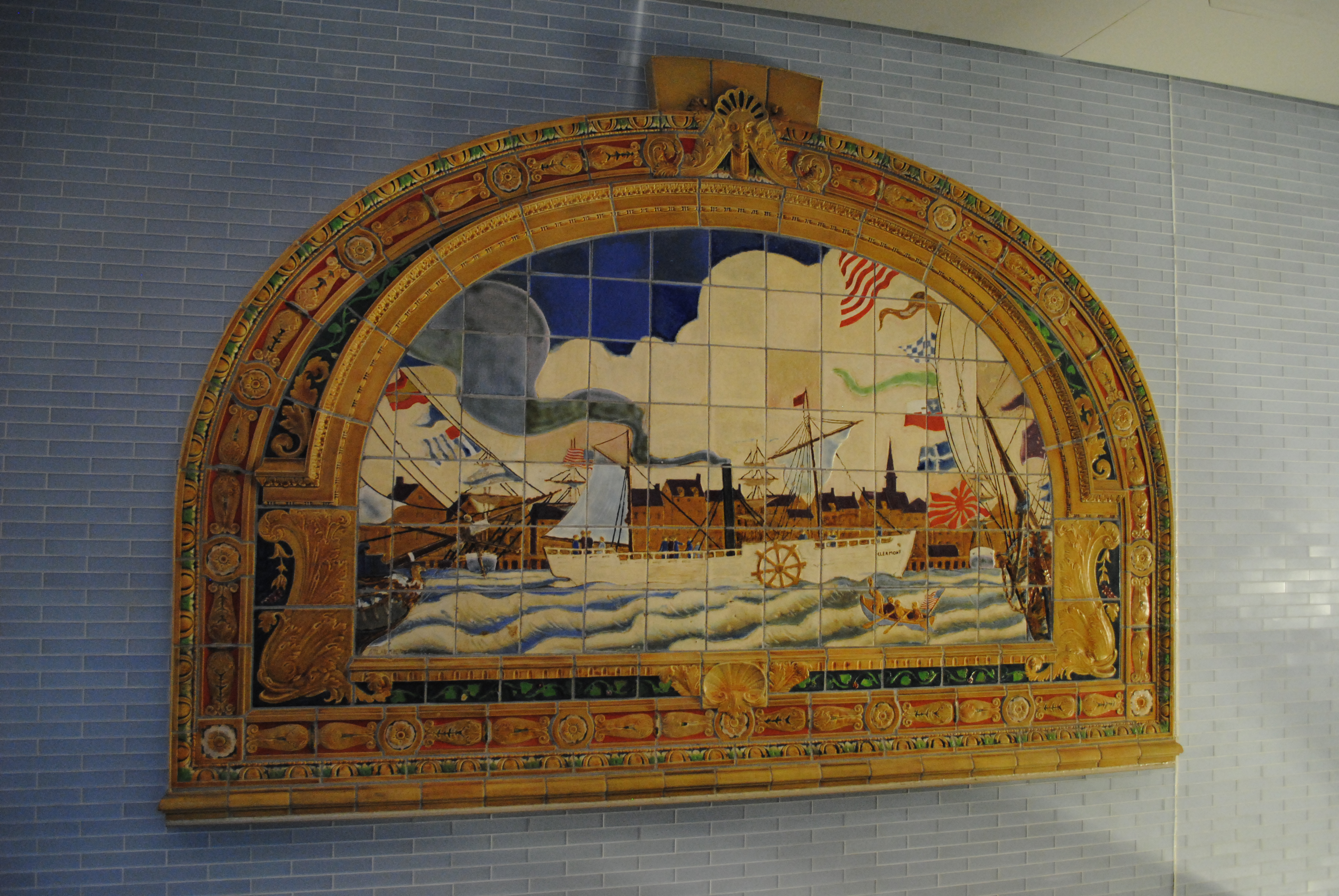
Frederick Dana Marsh designed numerous terracotta murals for the Marine Grill, some of which were reinstalled in the Fulton Street station.

In the hotel's basement was the Marine Grill, which could fit 250 people. The Marine Grill, also known as the ratskeller, was designed in the Spanish Renaissance style with arched niches and ceiling vaults. According to a promotional booklet for the hotel, the space was decorated with "beautifully colored, glazed terra-cotta tiles, [which have] made it really unique and one of New York's most talked about novelties." The Marine Grill was illuminated by recessed lighting on the ceiling and lamps on the tables.

The space had numerous terracotta murals designed by Frederick Dana Marsh. Each mural measured 8 feet 2 inches (2.49 m) tall by 11 feet 7 inches (3.53 m) wide and was shaped like a lunette. Of the 16 original murals, 12 depicted two sets of six related scenes, while the other four depicted separate motifs. The murals depicted historical scenes of New York Harbor, including Henry Hudson's Half Moon and Robert Fulton's North River Steamboat. The Marine Grill was relatively obscure due to its location in the basement. According to The New York Times, the space "was generally unknown to architectural aficionados and not listed in encyclopedic works like the WPA Guide to New York City or the AIA Guide to New York City".

The original Marine Grill had been closed by 1951. The restaurant was renovated in 1957 and was rebranded the Gate of Cleve, after a restaurant in Amsterdam called Die Port van Cleve. The Gate of Cleve was not successful, and a German restaurant, an Indian restaurant, and a Japanese restaurant all occupied the space in subsequent years. In the early 1970s, it operated as an event space. During the 1980s, the Grenadier Realty Corporation had unsuccessfully attempted to lease the space. The New York City Landmarks Preservation Commission declined to preserve the restaurant as a landmark, and the restaurant was demolished in 1989 to make way for a Gap clothing store. Susan Tunick, president of the non-profit group Friends of Terra Cotta, saw dumpsters outside the hotel filled with fragments from the murals. In 2001, six of the murals were reassembled under the oversight of the MTA Arts for Transit program at the William Street entrance of the New York City Subway's Fulton Street station.

=== Guestrooms and apartments ===
==== Original hotel rooms ====
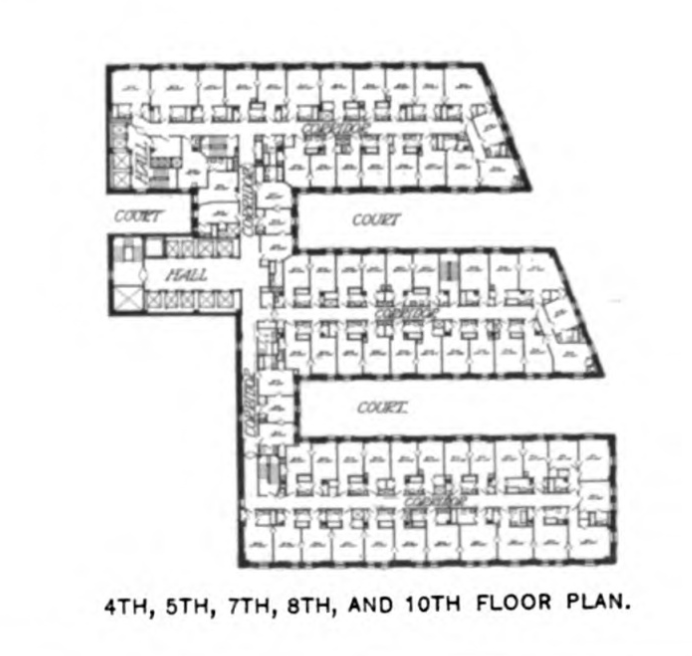
Typical plan of a guestroom floor

When the hotel opened, it had 1,500 guestrooms and 1,100 bathrooms. At the time of its completion, this made the McAlpin the largest hotel in New York City. The hotel rooms started at the third story and ended just below the roof. All rooms faced outward toward the street or a light court. The larger rooms faced the street, while smaller rooms faced light courts. Some of the bathrooms were placed between two guestrooms so every guestroom had a bathroom. Each story also had a floor clerk and a kitchen. At its peak, the McAlpin contained 1,700 guestrooms, as some of the smaller units were split up.

The third floor contained sample hotel rooms. In addition, there were two gender-specific floors: one each for men and women. The Greeley Square Hotel Company designated one story as a women-only floor at the suggestion of philanthropist Anne Morgan. The sixth floor was designated as a women-only floor and contained a library, lounge, and reception room. It was staffed entirely by women and had its own elevator and checkout area, as well as a library of fiction books. Men could not access the women's-only floor unless they were accompanying a woman. The 19th floor was converted to a women's floor in 1938. The 22nd floor was designated as the men's floor and had a stairway leading directly up to the baths on the 24th floor. The men's floor was designed like a private club. The United Service Club for Army and Navy Officers was on the same story. In addition, there was a men's lounge immediately above the 22nd floor, with a library, smoking room, bar, stock ticker, stenographer, and seating areas.

On the floor below the ballroom were rooms for 500 servants. The servants' rooms were arranged based on their tenure, according to the New-York Tribune, "so that the high salaried domestics would not be obliged to associate with the inferior fellow workers between the hours of duty". The 16th floor, dubbed the "sleepy 16th", was designed for night workers, so it was kept quiet during the day.

==== Modern apartments ====
In the late 1970s, the hotel was converted into about 690 apartments, including 30 model apartments designed by Macy's. These were composed of 333 studio apartments, which covered 440 square feet (41 m^{2}) on average, and 357 one-bedroom apartments with one to two bathrooms, which ranged from 670 to 790 square feet (62 to 73 m^{2}). The McAlpin's apartments included soundproof windows, large closets, and parquet floors, as well as concrete floors. Some of the original decorations were preserved when the McAlpin was renovated. The building was converted to 692 condominiums in 2007, including 330 studio apartments and 280 one-bedroom apartments. The studios ranged from 450 to 525 square feet (41.8 to 48.8 m^{2}); the one-bedroom units averaged 650 square feet (60 m^{2}); and the two-bedroom units averaged 1,000 square feet (93 m^{2}).

When the McAlpin became an apartment building in the 1970s, the roof was converted into a fitness center that included a sauna, swimming pool, squash courts, and game rooms. By the 2000s, Herald Towers' rooftop contained a New York Sports Club and a rooftop terrace.

== History ==
Prior to the Hotel McAlpin's construction, the site had contained low-rise residences, as well as the eight-story Alpine Building at Broadway and 33rd Street. The Alpine had housed "legislators, actors, and business executives". David Hunter McAlpin had owned the site, and the trustees of his estate took over the site following his death in 1901.

=== Construction ===
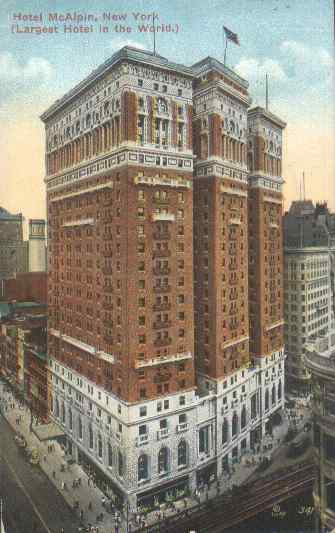
1914 Postcard photo of the Hotel McAlpin

The Greeley Square Hotel Company was incorporated in June 1910 to lease the site from the McAlpin family. The directors included Frank Mills Andrews, Charles P. Taft, T. Coleman du Pont, Lucius M. Boomer, and William W. McAlpin (D. H. McAlpin's son). The company planned to develop a hotel on the east side of Broadway between 33rd and 34th Streets. Workers started demolishing the existing buildings in September 1910. Nearly all existing tenants left the site, except the Mutual Bank at the base of the Alpine Building, which had two years remaining on its lease. In April 1911, the Greeley Square Hotel Company formally leased the site from the McAlpin family for 21 years, paying between $4 million and $5 million. Under the terms of the lease, the McAlpin estate was to lend $2 million to the Greeley Square Hotel Company for the construction of a 20-story hotel costing $3.04 million.

The Greeley Square Hotel Company had awarded a contract for the site's demolition by the end of 1910. Andrews, who was president of the Greeley Square Hotel Company, submitted plans for the hotel to the New York City Bureau of Buildings in January 1911. However, the bureau refused to approve the plans for two months, saying that the plans failed to comply with various building codes. The city's commissioner of buildings said that, under the building code, only about 51 percent of the lot area may be covered above the first story. By mid-1911, the Greeley Square Hotel Company was planning to build a 28-story hotel for $5.05 million, and it was permitted to borrow up to $4 million. It took five months to excavate 175,000 short tons (156,000 long tons; 159,000 t) of rock from the site; the excavation was completed in August 1911. The Thompson–Starrett Company was then hired as the hotel's general contractor. During the hotel's construction, a worker dropped a piece of terracotta onto a passing streetcar, killing a passenger. Andrews went to Europe in August 1912 to acquire furniture for the new hotel.

The hotel officially opened on December 29, 1912, at a total cost of $13.5 million. It was the largest hotel in the world at the time; The New York Times commented that the 25-story McAlpin "seems isolated from other buildings". On opening day, 600 guests ate dinner from custom-made silver plates. The hotel could accommodate 2,500 guests and employed either 1,500 or 2,000 servants. It was built at a cost of $13.5 million ($450 million today). Room rates ranged from $1.50 to $5.00 per night. A promotional booklet for the hotel advertised the hotel's proximity to various modes of transit, including the original Pennsylvania Station, as well as elevated, streetcar, and subway lines. Lucius M. Boomer, who also operated the adjacent Waldorf-Astoria and the Hotel Claridge, was the McAlpin's first manager. Boomer was associated with Du Pont's group, which controlled all of these hotels.

=== Operation as hotel ===
==== Early years ====
The McAlpin family acquired two lots on 46 and 48 West 34th Street, measuring 50 by 100 feet (15 by 30 m), in December 1914. The Greeley Square Hotel Company planned to build an annex on the site, but the company was forced to postpone these plans during World War I. By early 1915, the hotel company decided to build the annex, as the hotel's business had increased sufficiently. In February 1915, the Greeley Square Hotel Company filed plans with the New York City Bureau of Buildings for a 23-story annex on the site, to be designed by Warren and Wetmore. The new addition was expected to provide an additional 200 rooms, four elevators, an enlarged ballroom, and a children's play area on the sixth floor. The company began razing the existing buildings the same month, although the structures were not completely demolished until the end of 1916. The annex was built during 1917; the same year, Boomer opened a store for employees, selling merchandise at reduced prices.

When Boomer went to Europe in 1918, Benjamin B. McAlpin began managing the Hotel McAlpin's finances. In 1922, the McAlpin became one of the first hotels to link ship-to-shore radios into their phone system. In February 1925, an antenna for radio station WMCA was installed atop the building, reaching 430 feet (130 m) above ground. The same year, the McAlpin replaced 50 beds on the 22nd floor with oversized beds for tall guests; it also signed a contract with the Curtiss Flying Service in 1926, allowing guests to book flights quickly. The McAlpin family sold the site to the Greeley Square Hotel Company in September 1926 for $7.2 million.

Frank A. Duggan took over as the hotel's manager in 1928. A major refurbishment costing $2.1 million was announced that May. The owners refreshed the rooms, installed modern bathrooms, and updated the elevators; in addition, numerous groups of three rooms were combined into two rooms. The project was completed that December. By 1930, there were rumors that the hotel would be replaced with a skyscraper, but Duggan denied these rumors. At the end of 1931, John J. Woelfe replaced Duggan as the hotel's manager. The Greeley Square Hotel Company transferred the hotel in 1934 to the 34th Street Hotel Corporation, subject to a $7.4 million mortgage from the New York Life Insurance Company. This only involved a nominal change in ownership. At the time, the hotel was valued at $5.5 million.

==== New York Life ownership ====
Communist Party leaders review election returns at the Hotel McAlpin, November 7, 1946 Left to right: Si Gerson, Robert G. Thompson, Israel Amter, Benjamin J. Davis Jr.

By January 1936, the McAlpin's operators were considering spending $2 million to renovate the hotel, expanding the ballroom and relocating some rooms. In addition, the operators planned to expand the cafe and restore its horseshoe-shaped bar, which had been a popular feature of the cafe before it was removed during Prohibition. In November 1936, to satisfy a $3.14 million lien, the Title Guarantee and Trust Company moved to foreclose on the hotel. At the time, the McAlpin had 1,444 rooms. At an auction the same month, the Title Guarantee and Trust Company paid $135,000 for the property. The hotel was renovated in 1937. Myers, Minott & Co. Inc. and W. & J. Sloane were hired to renovate different sections of the hotel. Myers, Minott & Co. Inc. redecorated approximately 300 rooms in two color schemes, while W. & J. Sloane redecorated the remaining rooms in four color schemes. As part of the project, the 19th floor was converted into a women-only floor, with a dedicated lounge and library. The New York Life Insurance Company hired the Knott hotel chain to manage it in May 1938.

New York Life was in the process of selling the hotel by May 1945; the McAlpin was valued at $7.8 million at the time. Shortly afterward, the media reported that Joseph Levy, president of Crawford Clothes, had agreed to buy the hotel. Levy, who operated a small store at the hotel's base on 33rd Street, planned to expand his store after the end of World War II. Levy's company Jamlee Hotels took title to the hotel in June 1945; the company paid $5.25 million, including $1.2 million in cash and $4.05 million toward the mortgage. The hotel remained an upscale hostelry during this time.

Jamlee reportedly invested an additional $1,760,000 in renovations. Levy hired the firm of Ely Jacques Kahn and Robert Allan Jacobs to redesign the Crawford store, combining seven stores into a single, large space. These modifications include installing a new storefront with display windows, recessed behind the hotel's facade to create an arcade along the sidewalk, as well as a main entrance with curved glass doors at the corner of 34th Street and Broadway. The store, marketed as the "Store of Tomorrow", predated the construction of strip malls with outdoor arcades. Knott Hotels subsidiary Hotel McAlpin Inc. leased the hotel from Levy in January 1949. The Tisch Organization took over the hotel's operation at the beginning of 1952, with plans to spend $1,225,000 on renovations. Tisch hired Norman D. Waters Associates as the hotel's advertising agent, and it appointed Alexander C. Allen as the hotel's manager in 1953.

==== Sheraton ownership ====
Sheraton Hotels and Resorts offered to buy the hotel in September 1954 for $3 million. Following several weeks of negotiations, Jamlee sold the hotel to Sheraton for $9 million that October. Under the terms of Tisch's lease, which ran through 1958, Sheraton had to give nine months' notice before breaking the lease. Although Sheraton was scheduled to take over the hotel in May 1955, Tisch refused to hand over the lease for several months. Sheraton finally gained full control of the hotel in September 1955, and the McAlpin was renamed the Sheraton-McAlpin. At the time, Sheraton president Ernest Henderson announced plans to renovate the hotel for $2 million. Sheraton completely renovated the hotel five years later and renamed it the Sheraton-Atlantic Hotel in October 1959. Sheraton sold the underlying land to United States Steel and the Carnegie Pension Fund in 1961, but it retained ownership of the hotel building. In anticipation of the opening of the nearby Madison Square Garden arena, Sheraton made further upgrades to the Sheraton-Atlantic during the mid-1960s. For example, the chain hired a special-events director, added double beds to many guestrooms, and replaced the elevators.

Sheraton sold the hotel to the investing partnership of Sol Goldman and Alexander DiLorenzo in June 1968 for $7.5 million; the partnership also agreed to lease the land for 94 years. Goldman and DiLorenzo took over the hotel the next month and restored the original name. In early 1970, the owners opened a 299-seat off-Broadway theater, the McAlpin Rooftop Theater, on the 24th floor. The basement restaurant contained the hotel's only kitchen, so Goldman and DiLorenzo decided to convert the mezzanine-level lounge into a dining room called the McAlpin Grill. Subsequently, the basement restaurant became the Alpine Cellar, used by large groups and special events. The owners hosted shows in the Alpine Cellar, and the hotel was charging $14 to $26 per night by 1970. Goldman and DiLorenzo had planned to replace the McAlpin, and numerous adjacent structures that they also owned, with a 50-story building. Goldman began experiencing financial issues after DiLorenzo died in 1975, and Sheraton reacquired the hotel in January 1976 after Goldman defaulted on his mortgage.

=== Apartment conversion ===
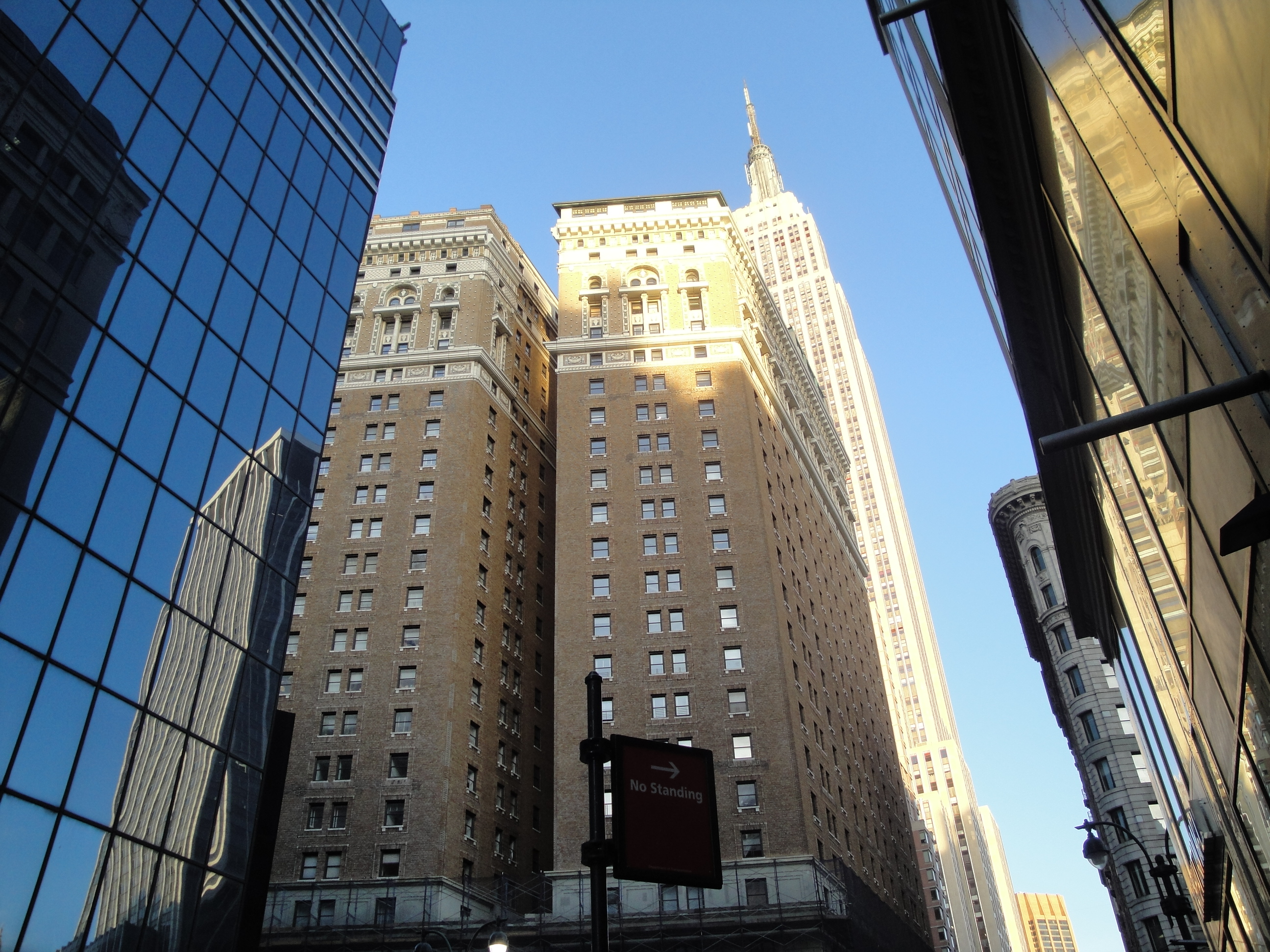
The Hotel McAlpin as seen from 33rd Street, facing eastward

==== Zeckendorf ownership ====
Developer William Zeckendorf Jr. began negotiating to buy the hotel in April 1976. Zeckendorf and his partners, Justin Colin and the Starrett Corporation, bought the hotel for $2.5 million that July. The new owners immediately closed the hotel; they planned to spend $9 million converting the building to rental apartments over the following 18 months. Zeckendorf said at the time: "This is the proper time for a new era of hotel construction here." Zeckendorf and his partners formed McAlpin Apartments Inc. to oversee the apartment conversion. This was one of several residential projects in which Zeckendorf was involved during the late 1970s, and it was the first of more than 20 residential developments that Zeckendorf oversaw during the next decade. The owners started a 120-day sale of furnishings and decorations that November, including televisions, linens, office equipment, and chandeliers. At that point, approximately 30 tenants remained, many of them elderly residents of rent-controlled apartments. The remaining tenants alleged that the owners were trying to evict them by discontinuing room service and shutting off the heat and hot water.

The project was stalled until mid-1977, when Zeckendorf announced that he and his partners would convert the building to rental apartments later the same year. The owners requested permission from the New York City Board of Standards and Appeals to convert the stories above the third floor to apartments. The owners unsuccessfully attempted to find private financing for nine months. By 1978, the McAlpin's owners had received a 40-year mortgage commitment from the United States Department of Housing and Urban Development. At the time, the conversion was the largest such project in New York City's history, with an expected cost of $25 million. The lower floors were converted to retail. J. J. Sopher & Co. began leasing apartments at the McAlpin in August 1979, and the building reopened in July 1980 as the McAlpin House.

As part of the city's J-51 program, the building received a 15-year tax abatement in 1980. To qualify for the abatement, the owners placed the apartments under rent regulation, which limited how much rent the owners could charge. Existing tenants could retain their rent-regulated apartments until they moved out, but anyone who moved into the building after the tax abatement expired on June 30, 1995, paid market rates. A renovation of the facade started in 1989 and continued over the next two years. In addition, the Marine Grill was demolished the same year to make way for a Gap store. A Gitano store opened within the hotel's former mezzanine in 1990. Ian Schrager took over the McAlpin in early 1998. Schrager had planned to reopen the McAlpin as a 700-room hotel with "stylized American versions of European/Asian residential-style apartments".

==== JEMB and Property Markets Group ownership ====
JEMB Realty, controlled by Morris Bailey and Joseph Jerome, bought the McAlpin in August 1999 for $150 million and renamed it Herald Towers. The rebranding coincided with the revitalization of the neighborhood around Herald Square. The McAlpin had 290 rent-regulated apartments and 403 market-rate apartments at the time. JEMB planned to spend $10 million on renovating common rooms; refurbishing vacant studio apartments and one-bedroom units; and converting 70 units into furnished apartments for corporations. JEMB Realty attempted to sell Herald Towers in 2003 to Property Markets Group, but the two companies became involved in a legal dispute. As part of a settlement, Property Markets Group agreed to convert the apartments to condominiums, and JEMB agreed to sell the building after the Attorney General of New York approved a condominium offering plan.

Georgia Malone & Company negotiated to sell Herald Towers for $270 million in 2005. Property Markets Group took over the upper stories, while JEMB retained control of the storefronts at the building's base. Property Markets Group had sold 125 condos by early 2006, when more than 70 buyers reneged from their contracts following a revision to the offering plan. Amid continuing disputes over the Herald Towers condominium conversion, the New York Supreme Court reviewed the case in June 2006. The lawsuit was ultimately settled out of court. Around the same time, the attorney general's office began investigating allegations that some of the apartments were illegally being rented out as hotel rooms. The condominium conversion was completed in July 2007, and 124 condominiums had been sold by that November.

After the daughter of U.S. diplomat Eric G. John fell to her death at Herald Towers in 2010, residents expressed concerns that the building was attracting raucous parties and that the building's managers were not preventing such parties. The Gap store at the building's base operated until 2018. Some tenants had fallen behind on rent payments by 2021, prompting JEMB to sue these tenants. This prompted several tenants to file lawsuits in the New York Supreme Court. Additionally, in the early 2020s, amid efforts to legalize full-scale gambling in New York, Morris Bailey considered erecting a casino on the site of Herald Towers. In 2025, the clothing store Old Navy leased 55,000 square feet (5,100 m^{2}) on two floors of Herald Towers, relocating its store from 34th Street nearby, and Moomoo also opened a store there. During this time, JEMB spent $13 million renovating Herald Towers. Blackstone Inc. refinanced the building in September 2025, at which point it was 97% occupied.

== Notable events ==
In its early years, the McAlpin hosted numerous events. Former U.S. president William Howard Taft attended a party at the McAlpin in 1913 to mark the hotel's first anniversary. At a 1914 banquet in the hotel, members of the New York Democratic Party formed an organization to fight the Tammany Hall political machine. In October 1917 and again in December 1918, the McAlpin hosted conferences for the League of Small and Subject Nationalities, a New York City-based self-determinist organization led by Frederic C. Howe. When Luisa Tetrazzini sang from her hotel room in December 1920, the United States Army Signal Corps broadcast her performance to warships. This made Tetrazzini the first woman to sing to military personnel via radio broadcast. The New York Republican State Committee opened a headquarters at the McAlpin in 1926, and the Society of American Magicians also hosted its annual dinners at the McAlpin in the 1920s and 1930s.

In a 1945 ceremony at the hotel, Mordecai Kaplan was excommunicated by the Union of Orthodox Rabbis of the United States and Canada. Jackie Robinson was living on the 11th floor in 1947 when the Brooklyn Dodgers called to tell him that he would be the first African American player in Major League Baseball. The building's facade contains a plaque with the text "In this building on April 10, 1947, Jackie Robinson received his historic call from the Brooklyn Dodgers and changed America."

The hotel continued to host major events in later years. The hotel hosted the U.S. National High School Chess Championship every year from 1969 to 1975, except for 1973. Additionally, the First National Jewish Women's Conference took place at the hotel in 1973, after the Reform Jewish denomination began to ordain female rabbis. During the 1976 Democratic Party presidential primaries, U.S. senator Fred R. Harris of Oklahoma launched his presidential campaign at the hotel, and California governor Jerry Brown had his headquarters on the McAlpin's 15th floor.

== See also ==
- List of buildings and structures on Broadway in Manhattan
- List of former hotels in Manhattan
