= SS Frederic C. Howe =

World War II Liberty ship of the United States

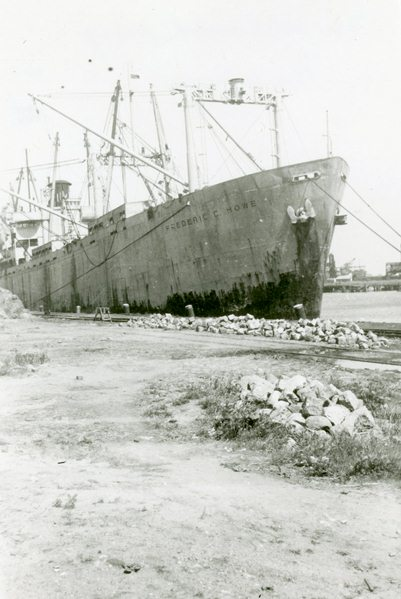
- Frederic C. Howe

History

United States
- Name: Frederic C. Howe
- Namesake: Frederic C. Howe
- Owner: War Shipping Administration (WSA)
- Operator: United Fruit Co.
- Ordered: as type (Z-EC2-S-C2) hull, MC hull 1536
- Builder: J.A. Jones Construction, Panama City, Florida
- Cost: $1,824,649
- Yard number: 18
- Way number: 2
- Laid down: 24 August 1943
- Launched: 30 October 1943
- Completed: 6 December 1943
- Identification: Call Signal: KYPR
- Fate: Laid up in National Defense Reserve Fleet, James River Group, Lee Hall, Virginia, 10 October 1947; Sold for non-transportation use (NTU), 9 June 1972

General characteristics
- Class & type: type Z-EC2-S-C2, army tank transport
- Tonnage: 10,865 LT DWT; 7,176 GRT
- Displacement: 3,380 long tons (3,434 t) (light); 14,245 long tons (14,474 t) (max)
- Length: 441 feet 6 inches (135 m) oa; 416 feet (127 m) pp; 427 feet (130 m) lwl
- Beam: 57 feet (17 m)
- Draft: 27 ft 9.25 in (8.4646 m)
- Installed power: 2 × Oil fired 450 °F (232 °C) boilers, operating at 220 psi (1,500 kPa); 2,500 hp (1,900 kW)
- Propulsion: 1 × triple-expansion steam engine, (manufactured by General Machinery Corp., Hamilton, Ohio); 1 × screw propeller
- Speed: 11.5 knots (21.3 km/h; 13.2 mph)
- Capacity: 562,608 cubic feet (15,931 m^{3}) (grain); 499,573 cubic feet (14,146 m^{3}) (bale)
- Complement: 38–62 USMM; 21–40 USNAG
- Armament: Varied by ship; Bow-mounted 3-inch (76 mm)/50-caliber gun; Stern-mounted 4-inch (102 mm)/50-caliber gun; 2–8 × single 20-millimeter (0.79 in) Oerlikon anti-aircraft (AA) cannons and/or, 2–8 × 37-millimeter (1.46 in) M1 AA guns

SS Frederic C. Howe was a Liberty ship built in the United States during World War II. She was named after Frederic C. Howe, a member of the Ohio Senate, Commissioner of Immigration of the Port of New York, and president of the League of Small and Subject Nationalities.

== Construction ==
Frederic C. Howe was laid down on 24 August 1943, under a United States Maritime Commission (MARCOM) contract, MC hull 1536, by J.A. Jones Construction, Panama City, Florida; she was launched on 30 October 1943.

== History ==
She was allocated to United Fruit Co., on 6 December 1943. She was one of eight special ships, a Z-EC2-S-C2, a Tank carrier. She was built with larger cargo hold hatches and stronger crane lifts. J.A.Jones Construction built the eight Z-EC2-S-C2 Tank carrier in 1943. On 30 October 1947, she was laid up in the National Defense Reserve Fleet, in the James River Group, Lee Hall, Virginia. On 9 June 1972, she was sold for $38,753.54 to Union Minerals and Alloys Corporation, for non-transportation use (NTU). She was removed from the fleet on 18 August 1972.

== Bibliography ==
- "Jones Construction, Panama City FL". ShipbuildingHistory.com. 13 October 2010.
- "Liberty Ships – World War II".
- Maritime Administration. "Frederic C. Howe". Ship History Database Vessel Status Card. U.S. Department of Transportation, Maritime Administration. Archived from the original on 12 December 2019.
- Davies, James (May 2004). "Specifications (As-Built)" (PDF). p. 23.
- "SS Frederic C. Howe".
