= Capital controls in China =

Chinese government policy

The People's Republic of China maintains strict capital controls. An individual citizen is allowed to transfer around $50,000 of foreign currency a year, with transfers higher than that requiring permits from the State Administration of Foreign Exchange. China has viewed capital controls as a key anchor of economic stability, protecting from economic turbulence during the 1997 Asian financial crisis and the 2008 financial crisis.

== History ==
The Chinese government embarked on several measures to relax capital controls since the 1990s.

In 2006, the Qualified Domestic Institutional Investor programme was introduced, allowing selected domestic financial institutions to trade in overseas-listed equities and debt securities subject to a small quota.

In December 2011, China partially loosened its controls on inbound capital flows, which the Financial Times described as reflecting an ongoing desire by Chinese authorities for further liberalization.

Capital controls were tightened again following the 2015–2016 Chinese stock market turbulence.

in 2026, the Chinese government introduced further controls over capital outflow from the country. In May 2026, the China Securities Regulatory Commission, the People’s Bank of China, the Ministry of Public Security and five other government bodies announced a joint plan stating they will dismantle unauthorized offshore investment services that target mainland Chinese investors. Almost immediately after the announcement, the regulators announced action against Futu, Up Fintech and Long Bridge.
