= Leaf Hua Li =

Hong Kong businessman

- 李华
- Born: 1977 (age 48–49); Loudi, Hunan, China
- Education: Hunan University
- Occupation: Entrepreneur
- Title: Founder, chairman and chief executive officer of Futu

Leaf Hua Li (Chinese: 李华; pinyin: Lǐ Huá; born 1977), also known as Leaf Li, is a Chinese entrepreneur and business executive. He is the founder, chairman and chief executive officer of Futu Holdings, which operates the Futubull and Moomoo online investment platforms. Before founding Futu, Li was an early employee of Tencent, where he participated in the early development of QQ and helped found Tencent Video.

== Early life and education ==
Li was born in 1977 in Loudi, Hunan. He entered Hunan University in 1995, where he studied electronics and computer-related subjects, and graduated in 2000 with a bachelor's degree in computer science. (Note: The Hunan University Alumni Association identifies Li as a member of the university's 1996 computer science cohort.)

== Career ==
=== Tencent ===
Li joined Tencent in 2000 as the company's first graduate hire and employee number 18. He worked in marketing, operations, research and development, and product management, and participated in the early development of QQ.

During his time at Tencent, Li contributed to 24 Chinese and international patent applications. He later helped found Tencent Video and led its product design and development. Before leaving Tencent, Li headed the company's innovation centre, where he was responsible for incubating new businesses.

=== Futu and Moomoo ===
Li began investing in Hong Kong-listed shares after Tencent's listing in 2004. His frustration with brokerage services and trading software that he regarded as cumbersome and unreliable led him to develop his own online trading platform. Li left Tencent in 2008 and launched Futu's online brokerage in 2012. He invested about HK$40 million of his own money in regulatory capital and early operations. Tencent became one of the company's earliest investors. Futu listed on the Nasdaq on 8 March 2019.

Futu launched Moomoo as its international trading platform. Moomoo entered the United States market in 2018. It later expanded to Singapore, Australia, Japan, Canada, Malaysia and New Zealand.

In May 2026, the China Securities Regulatory Commission issued a pre-notification of administrative penalties against several Futu entities, alleging that they had provided securities, public-fund sales and futures services in mainland China without the required licences or approval. The regulator proposed confiscations and fines totalling approximately 1.85 billion yuan against the related entities and a personal fine of 1.25 million yuan against Leaf Li. Following the announcement, Futu's Nasdaq-listed shares fell by nearly 28 per cent, their lowest level in thirteen months.

In 2026, Li was named, alongside Futu and chief financial officer Arthur Yu Chen, as a defendant in a proposed securities class action in the United States District Court for the Southern District of New York. The complaint alleged that they had failed to adequately disclose legal risks associated with Futu's mainland China business; the allegations had not been adjudicated as of July 2026.

In August 2026, Forbes estimated Leaf Li's net worth at US$6.4 billion.
