= League for Small and Subject Nationalities =

Organization

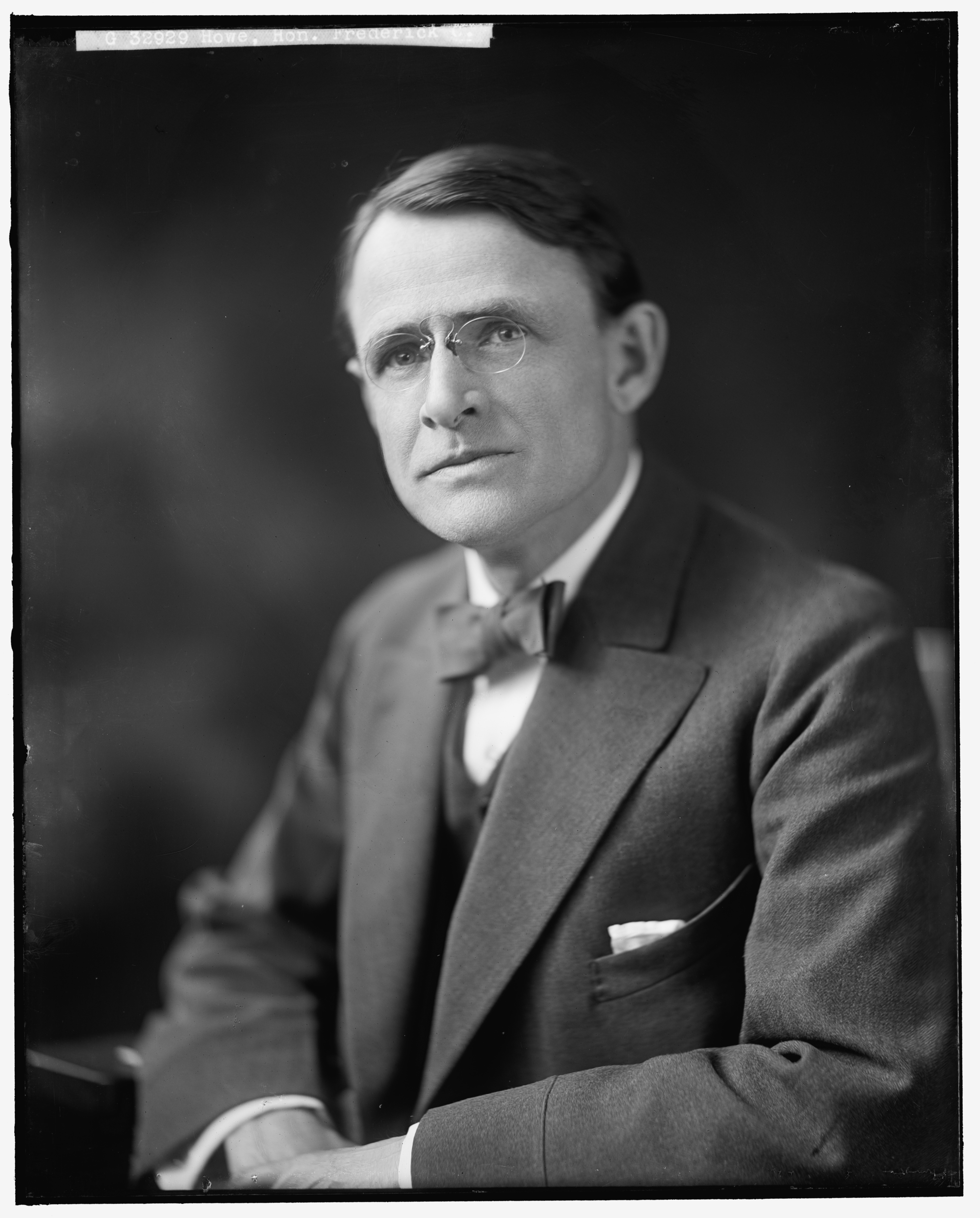
Frederic C. Howe, President of the League

The League of Small and Subject Nationalities, Inc. (LSSN), informally known as the League of Small Nations, was a self-determinist organization formed during World War I (1915 or May 1917) in New York City, with the following aims:

...to establish a permanent congress of the small, subject and oppressed nationalities of the world; to assert the right of each nationality to direct representation at the peace conference following this war, as well as at every international conference held thereafter for the discussion of questions affecting its interests; to present the case of these nationalities to the world; to emphasize the importance of restoring to these nationalities the right of self-government as an indispensable condition for world peace..."

The League's president was Frederic C. Howe, who also served as Commissioner of Immigration of the Port of New York during World War I. The corresponding secretaries of the League were Marion A. Smith (Scottish-American) and Vincent F. Jankovski (Lithuanian). Jewish American banker Jacob H. Schiff was offered the role of vice president of the League, but he declined. The League was headquartered at 480 Central Park West, New York City.

More than 25 nations sought representation in the League, taking into consideration displaced nationals residing in the United States. The additional domestic aim of the League was to ease ethnic tensions between émigrés. Its creators were encouraged and inspired by President Woodrow Wilson's speeches concerning the ideas of self-determination and equality of nations. Howe's ideas, based in part upon the same ideals behind Wilson's concept of a League of Nations put forth in his Fourteen Points, led to the formation of the League for Small and Subject Nationalities. The League sought the formation of a congress to ensure the equal representation of all nations in the Paris Peace Conference and in the post–World War I era.

Point XIV:

"A general association of nations must be formed under specific covenants for the purpose of affording mutual guarantees of political independence and territorial integrity to great and small states alike."

In 1917, the League held its first meeting, the First Congress of Small and Subject Nationalities, or World Conference of Small Nations in New York. The three-day conference was held from October 29–31 at the Hotel McAlpin, with 55 people in attendance. Following its controversial first meeting, the League was accused by the press of pro-German bias when the issue of Alsace-Lorraine was due to be discussed. The Irish delegation was represented by Hanna Sheehy-Skeffington of Sinn Féin, who was accused of sympathies for Germany. With the fallout from the Easter Rising and rise of Sinn Féin, Irish independence was a contentious issue, as anti-English sentiment was taken as pro-German sentiment. No fewer than twelve speaking delegates of Allied nations withdrew or resigned in protest of the perceived pro-German elements within the Congress. Belgian representative Senator Henri La Fontaine defended the League against attacks from the press, speaking and being interviewed on its behalf. Belgium was regarded by the League and Allied Powers as having one of the strongest cases for international protection against subjugation/oppression. Germany's atrocities committed in the Rape of Belgium were used as a propaganda device to bolster the war effort and anti-German sentiment. Prominent guest speakers and attendees included the likes of William Isaac Hull, Harry Allen Overstreet, Samuel T. Dutton, Moorfield Storey, and Hamilton Holt.

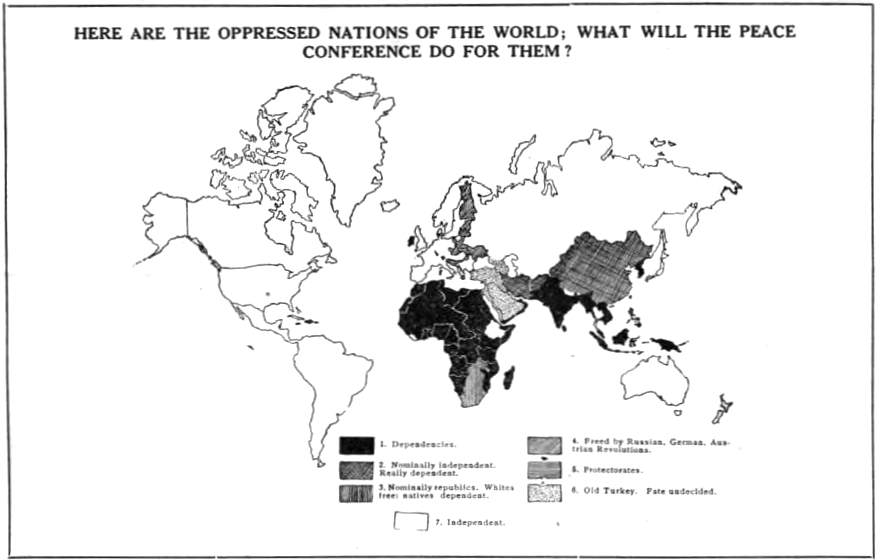
Oppressed Nations of the World map, 1919

A Second Congress was held December 14–15 of 1918 at the Hotel McAlpin and Liberty Theatre, attended by 22 nations. Again, the New York Times and other press accused the League and its organizers of having a pro-German agenda. Allegations of sedition and endorsement of the German war effort begat reluctance to associate with "pro-Hunism" and pacifism, even for oppressed and self-determinist movements. The main aim of this Second Congress was to gain a sense of the League's stance regarding the Peace Talks and the Russian Revolution. Additionally, an address was given by John Barrett, Director General of the Pan American Union, who had planned to attend the first Congress but backed out. Other speakers included Joseph D. Cannon, Patrick McCartan, Fan S. Noli, Lajpat Rai, Lincoln Steffens, Ivan Konigsberg, and W. E. B. Du Bois.

After correspondence with President Wilson, Howe attended the Paris Peace Conference, which failed to address the many ongoing calls for self-determination and decolonization. Howe left the project in order to focus on more pragmatic reform issues. By November 1919, with Howe's departure from the organization, the LSSN was rendered defunct. Other organizations performed similar functions to the League after its disbandment, the most prominent of which being the League of Oppressed Peoples, organized by Dudley Field Malone with the support of Howe, Oswald Garrison Villard, Arthur Upham Pope, Lajpat Rai, and W. E. B. Du Bois.

The League of Nations, precursor to the modern United Nations, was founded in January 1920 following the Paris Peace Talks.

== Members ==
Members of the League and their delegates (and delegates-designate) included:

- Africa
  - W. E. B. Du Bois, NAACP
- Albania
  - Fan S. Noli
  - Nicholas Tromara
  - Phocion Turtulli
- Alsace-Lorraine
  - Clément Rueff (resigned)
  - Daniel Jordan
  - Theophile Wucher
- Armenia
  - M. M. Housepian
  - Vahan Kurkjian
  - Miran Sevasly
- Assyria
  - Joel E. Werda
  - B. T. Jones
  - A. Mirzaoff
- Belgium
  - Henri La Fontaine
- Bohemia
  - Charles Pergler (resigned)
- China
- Denmark
  - Frode C. W. Rambusch
  - Echardt V. Eskesen
- Egypt
- Finland
  - Aino Malmberg
  - Toivo H. Nekton
- Greece
  - Adamantios Polyzoides (resigned)
  - George Caranicholas
  - Constantine Carusso
  - George D. Nicholas
- India
  - Lajpat Rai
  - J. R. Gaudhi
- Ireland
  - Hanna Sheehy-Skeffington
  - Patrick McCartan
  - Gertrude B. Kelly (2nd Congress)
  - Thomas J. Kennedy
  - Denis A. Spellissy
- Jews
  - Israel Friedlander
  - Bernard G. Richards
  - Henry Pereira Mendes
  - Richard Gottheil
  - Dr. Samuel Joseph
- Korea
  - Syngman Rhee
  - Park Yong-man
  - Kim Hŏn-sik
  - Chan-Ho Min
  - Henry Chung
- Latvia
  - Charles A. Carol
  - John Kweetin
- Lithuania
  - Vincent F. Jankovski
  - P. S. Villmont
  - Joseph Otto Sirvydas
- Norway
  - Edwin O. Holter (resigned)
- Poland
  - Sigismond Stojowski
  - W. O. Gorski
- Romania
  - Epaminonda S. Lucaciu (resigned)
  - Demetrius I. Andronescu
- Schleswig
  - Ivan Konigsberg
- Scotland
  - Chief Robert W. Douglas (Seamus Clannthearghuis)
  - Marion A. Smith
- Serbia
  - Thomas A. Mack
  - V.R. Savitch
  - Miloš Trivunac
- Sweden
  - Johannes Hoving
  - Charles J. Ogren
- Switzerland
  - Arthur K. Kuhn
  - William A. de Watteville
- Syria
  - Saleem Shehadeh George
- Transvaal
  - Gen. Samuel Pierson
  - Gen. Joachim D. Visser
- Ukraine
  - John J. Arden
  - Emil Reviewk
  - Miroslav Sichinsky

== Gallery of known delegates ==
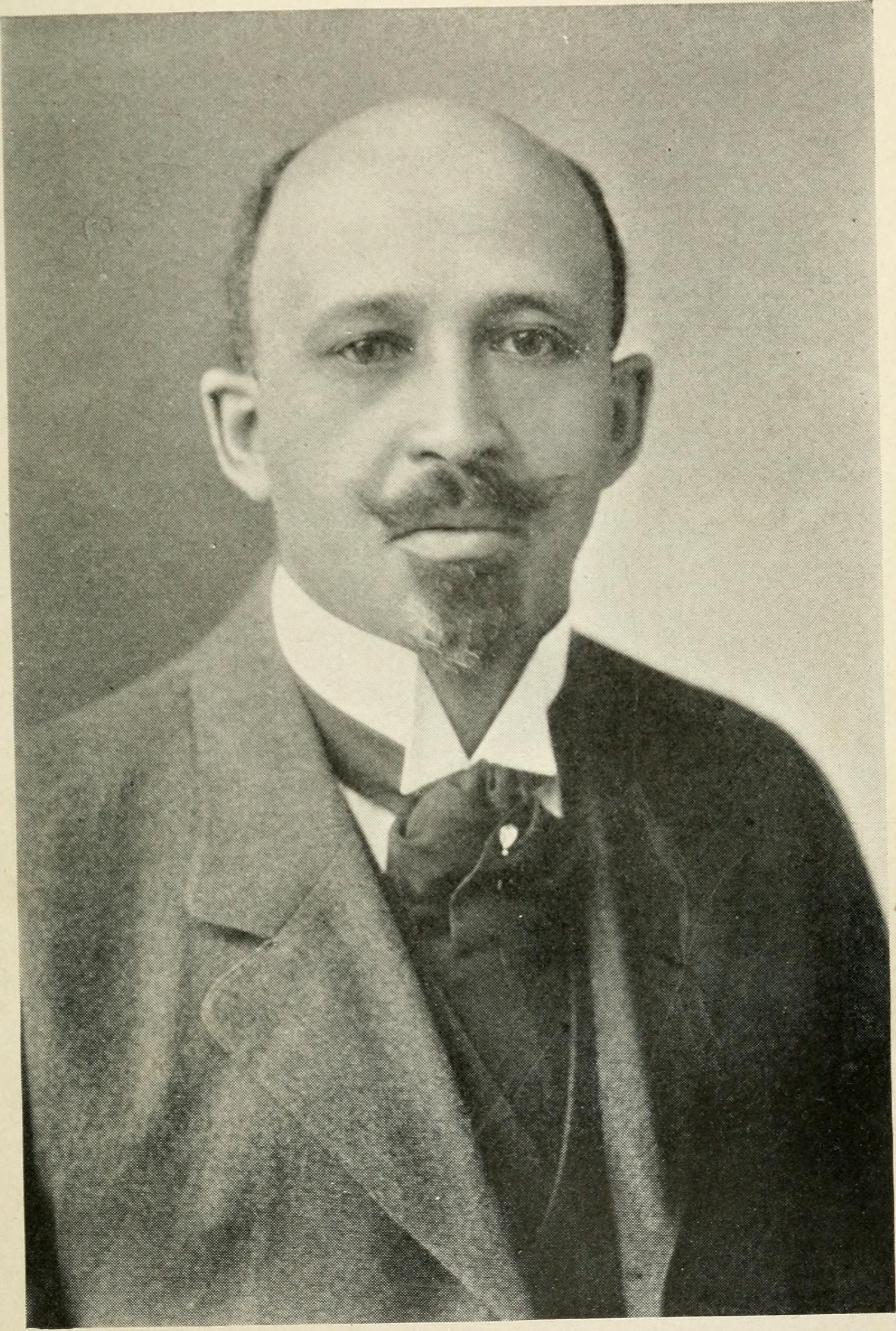
W. E. B. Du Bois

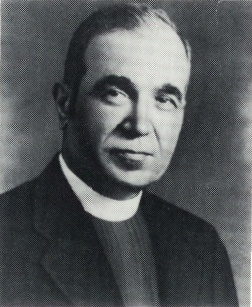
Fan S. Noli

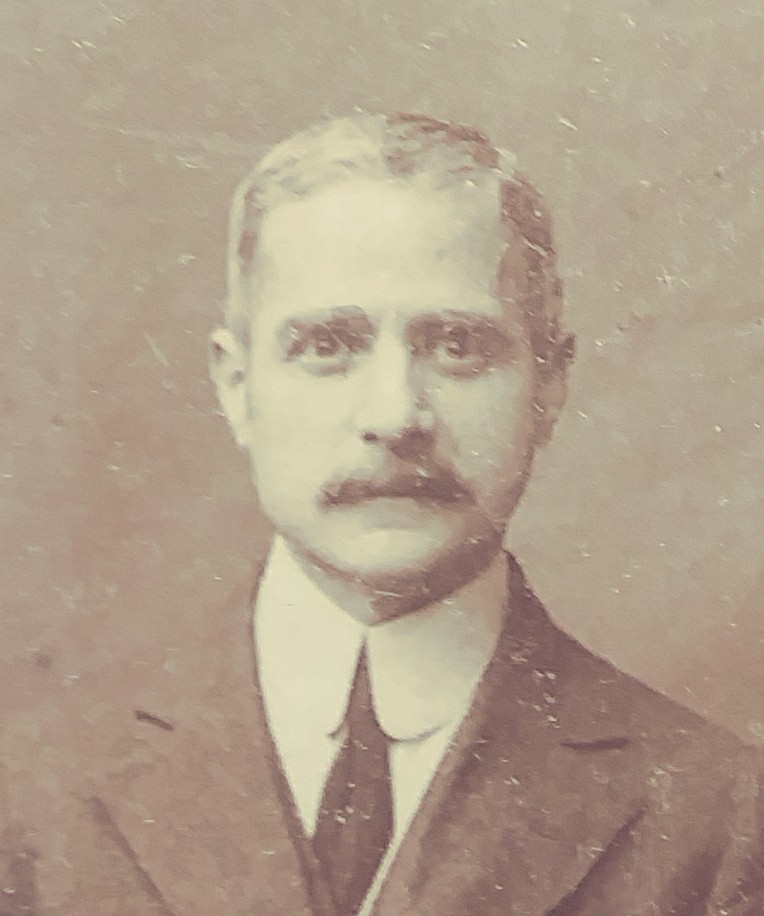
M. M. Housepian

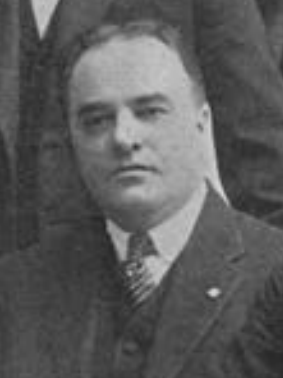
Joel E. Werda

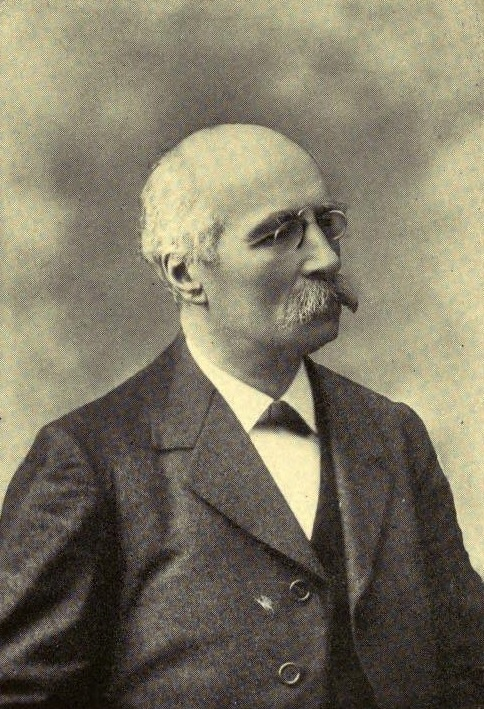
Henri La Fontaine

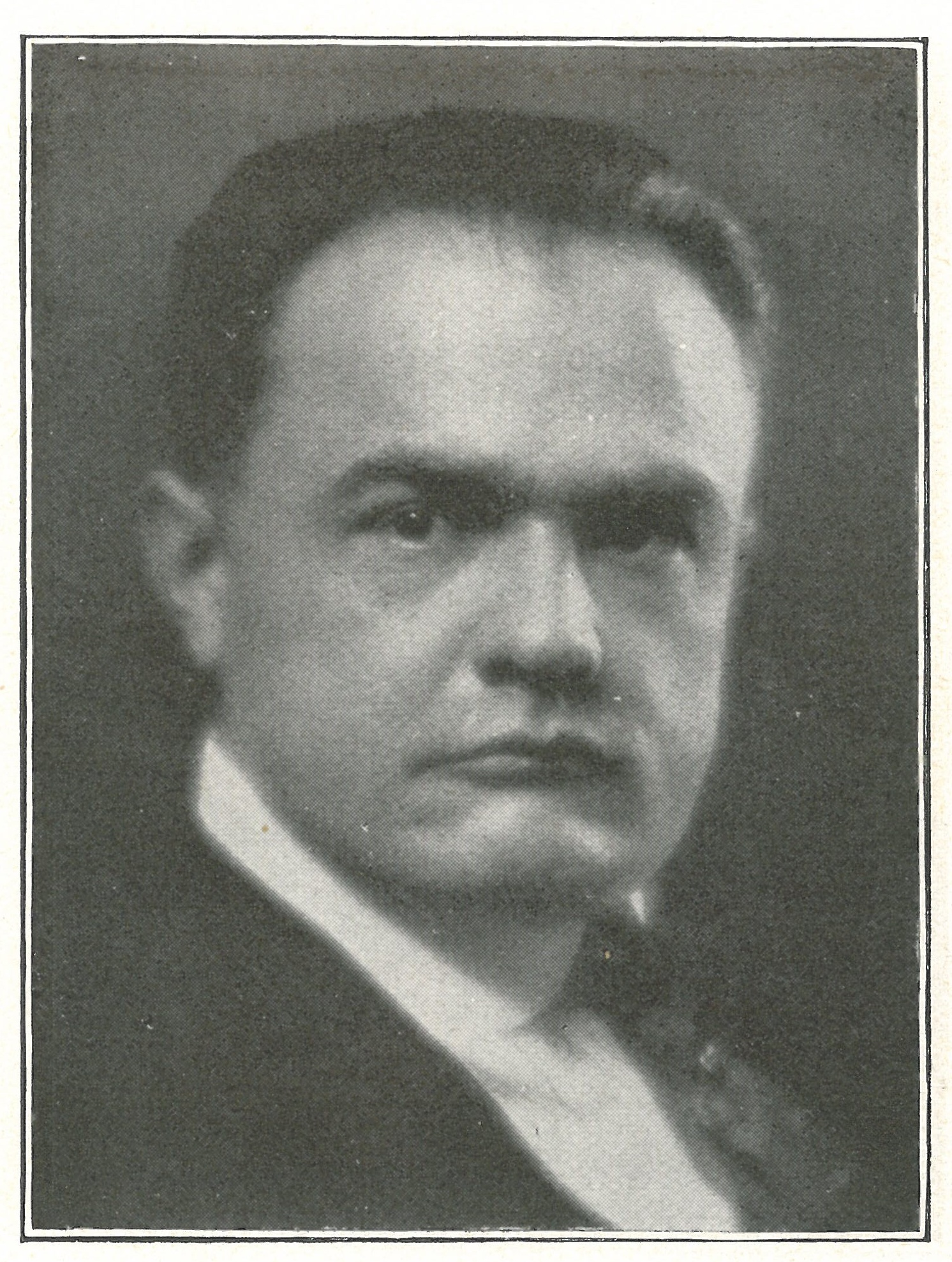
Charles Pergler

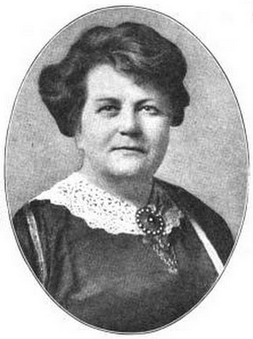
Aino Malmberg

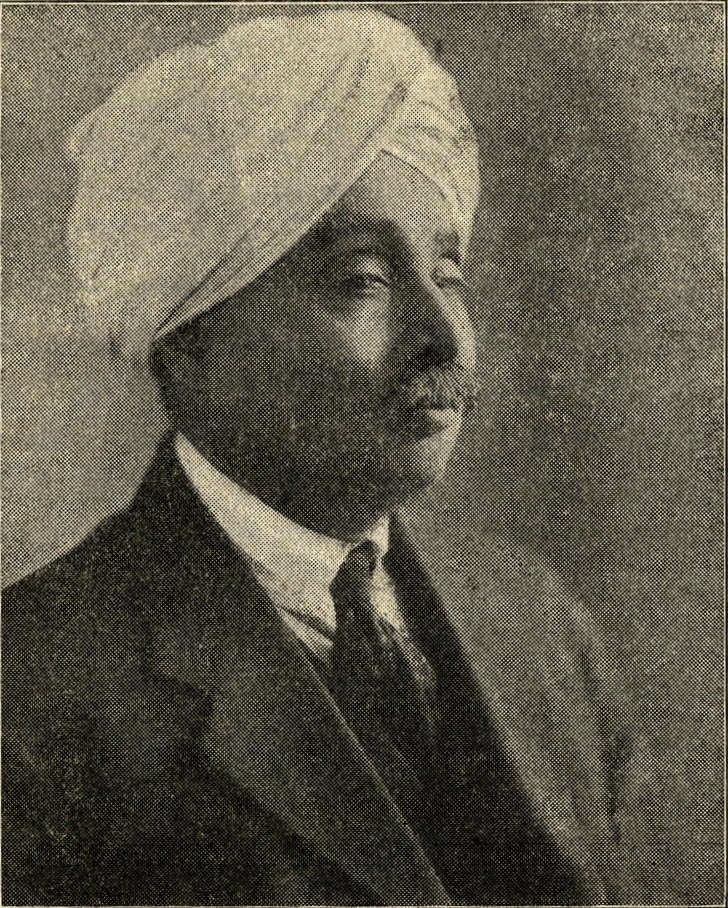
Lajpat Rai

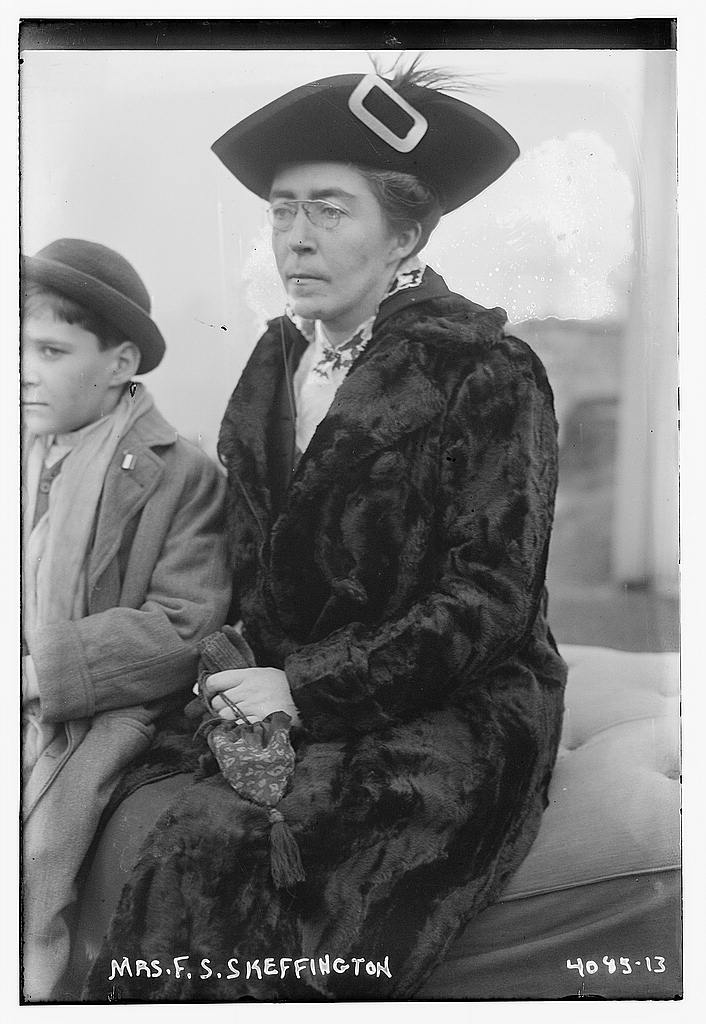
Hanna Sheehy-Skeffington

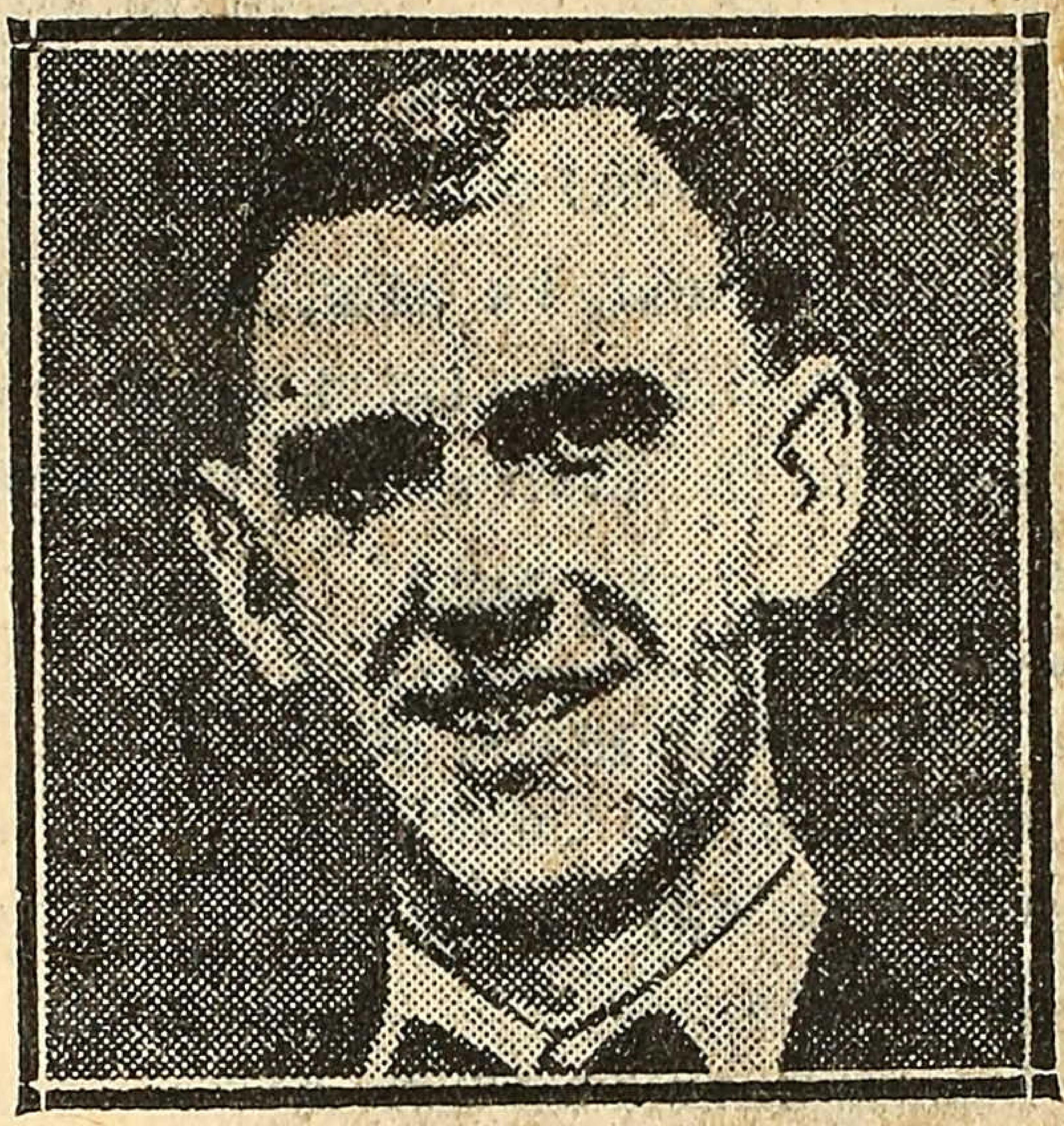
Patrick McCartan

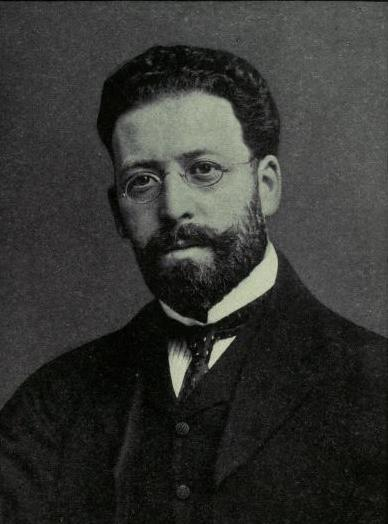
Israel Friedlander

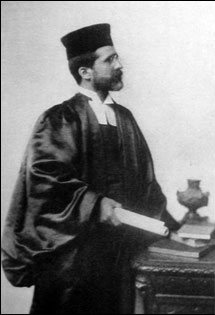
Henry Pereira Mendes

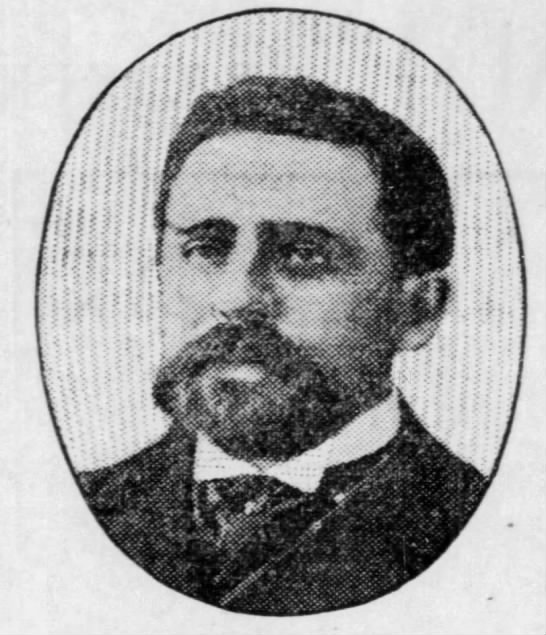
Richard Gottheil

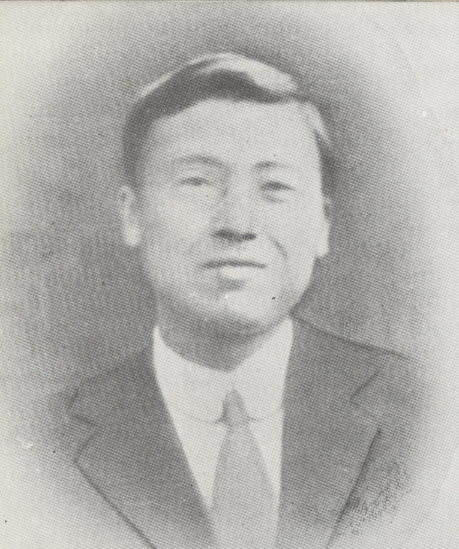
Syngman Rhee

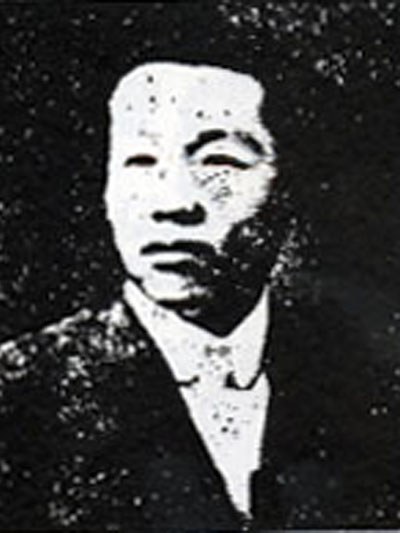
Park Yong-man

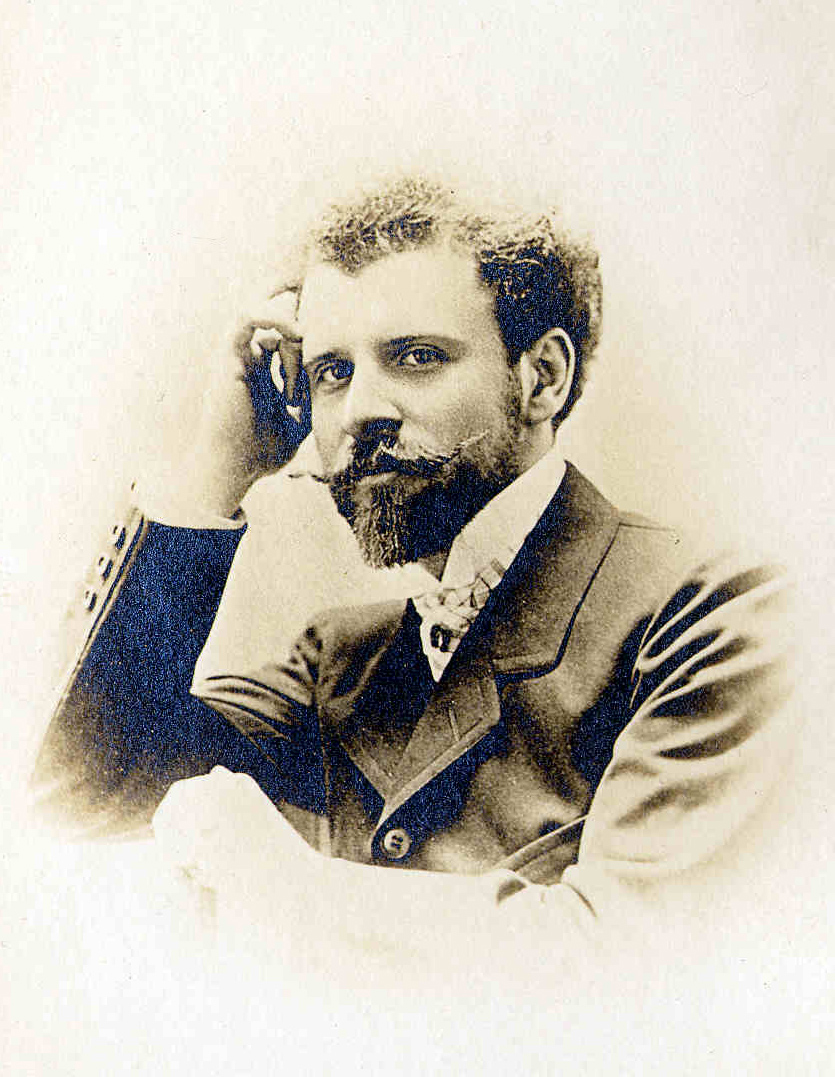
Sigismond Stojowski

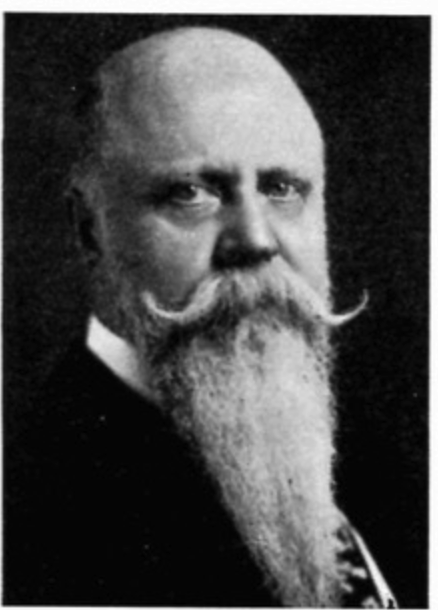
Johannes Hoving

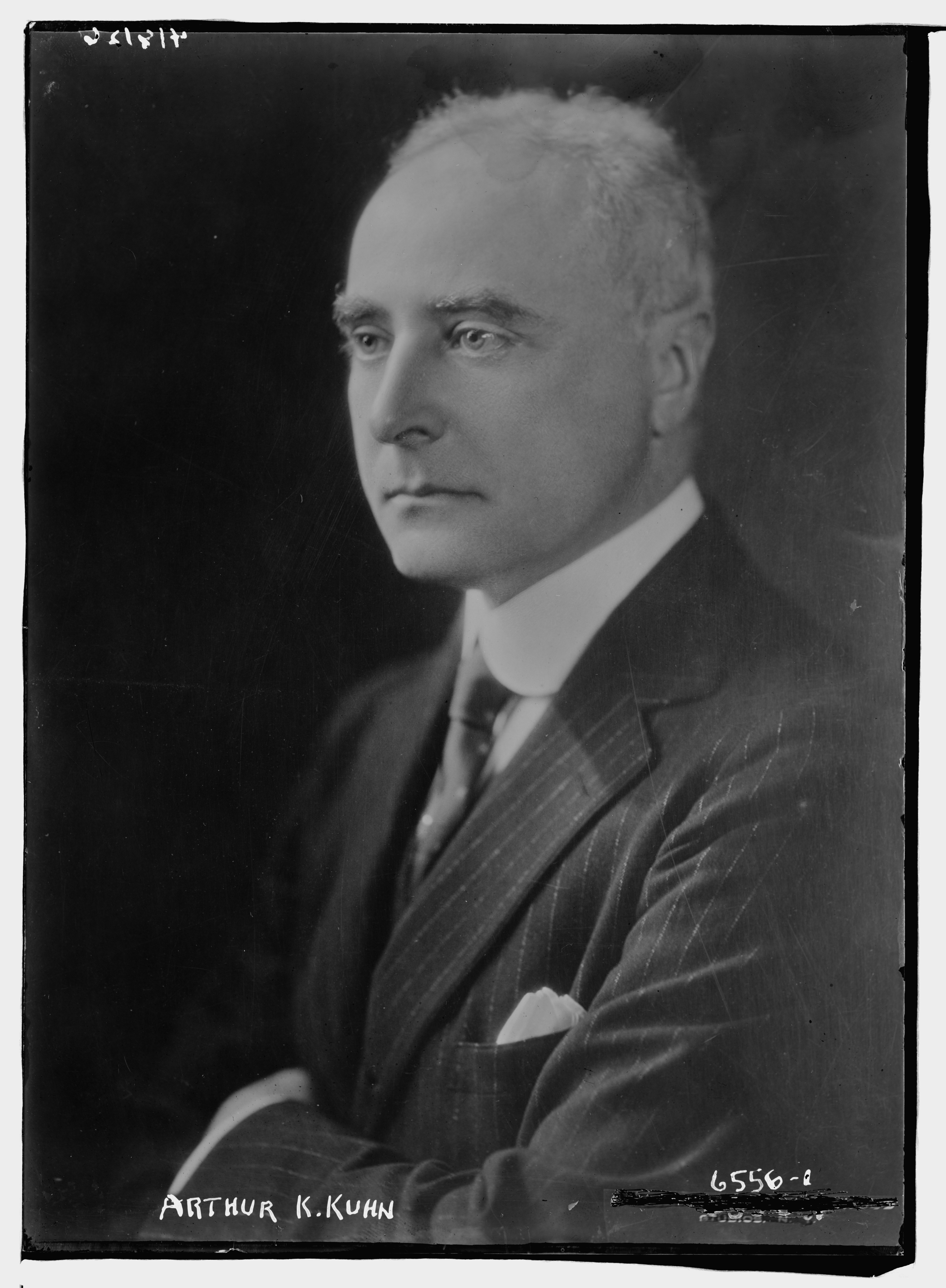
Arthur K. Kuhn

== See also ==
- Congress of Oppressed Nationalities of the Austro-Hungarian Empire
