= Lauri Malmberg =

Finnish general

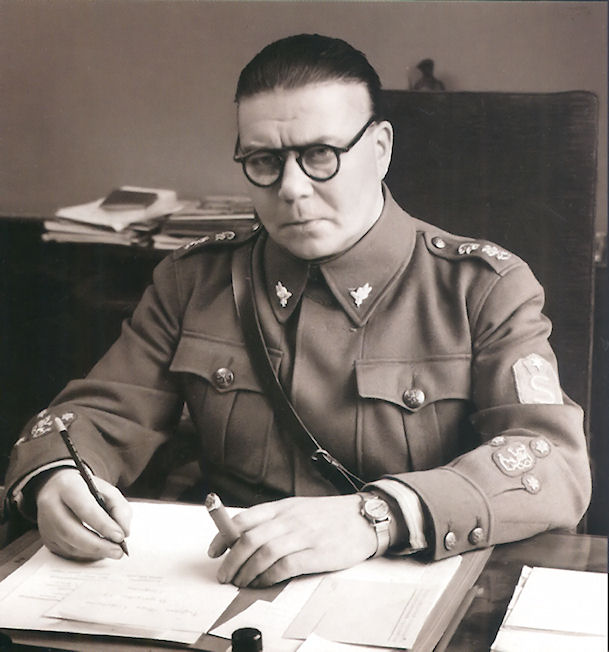
- Lauri Malmberg in 1927
- Born: May 8, 1888; Helsinki, Grand Duchy of Finland
- Died: March 14, 1948 (aged 59) Helsinki, Finland
- Allegiance: Finland
- Branch: Finnish Army
- Rank: Lieutenant general
- Commands: White Guard (1921–1944)
- Conflicts: World War I Finnish Civil War; Winter War; Continuation War

Kaarlo Lauri Torvald Malmberg (May 8, 1888 in Helsinki – March 14, 1948 in Helsinki) was a Finnish lieutenant general. He participated in the Jäger Movement and the Finnish Civil War, served briefly as Chief of Defence in 1925, and was Minister of Defense from 1924 to 1925. He is best known as the commander of the White Guard from 1921 to 1944, a position he held during, among other things, the Mäntsälä rebellion, the Winter War and the Continuation War.

== Biography ==
=== Early life, Jäger Movement and the Civil War ===
Malmberg was the son of Emil and Aino Malmberg, née Perenius. His brothers were Olavi and Erik Malmberg. Malmberg graduated with a degree in electrical engineering from the Polytechnical Institute in 1914 and then worked as an engineer at Strömberg's machine shop in Helsinki. His technical expertise came in handy in the activists' planning of sabotage against bridges, railways and telegraph lines as part of the fight against Russian supremacy.

Malmberg joined the Jäger Movement in 1915 and took part in the Finnish Civil War in 1918. He joined the Finnish Pfadfinder group at the Lockstedt training camp in Germany in March 1915 and served as an artilleryman in the Royal Prussian Jaeger Battalion 27 on the German Eastern Front in the Baltics in 1916–1917, where he rose to the rank of battery commander. He was the only Finnish Jäger in the artillery to reach the rank of major.

During the Civil War, Malmberg was appointed commander of an infantry division that advanced along the eastern shore of Lake Näsijärvi towards Tampere. His troops advanced through Messukylä to the centre of Tampere in heavy fighting. He then participated as commander of the Jäger Artillery Brigade in the fighting on the Karelian front and in the capture of Vyborg. During the war, Malmberg led the executions of six suspected Red Guards.

=== Interwar period ===
General Malmberg served as the Commander-in-Chief of the Finnish Civil Guards (a voluntary paramilitary defence organization) from 1921 to 1944, when the organization was abolished as an "anti-Soviet" organization. He also served as the Minister of Defence from 1924 to 1925. He was the Chief of Defence of the Finnish Defence Forces in 1925. At the time there was a power struggle between German-trained and Russian-trained officers in the Defence Forces. His appointment was a good compromise, because on the other hand he represented the White Guards and the German-trained officer faction, but on the other hand his loyalty to the civilian Finnish government was unwavering.

During his almost one-year term as minister, he implemented several important laws and regulations, including the law on educational institutions for officers with associated regulations on the War College, Kadettskolan (Cadet School) and the Reserve Officer School, as well as the law on the establishment of a fleet for coastal defense. In addition, he pushed through the replacement of older officers with Russian service merits with younger Jäger officers in leading positions in the army.

During the Mäntsälä rebellion of 1932, President Svinhufvud issued an order on 1 March in which he ordered all "protection corps to return to their home regions without delay, faithful to the laws and their oath, and to only obey orders from their own commanders". The proclamation was countersigned by Malmberg. At the same time, Malmberg spoke internally for a conciliatory solution and was unwilling to call on the radio for the men of the uprising to return home - he believed that the best way out was for the government to resign. However, it was Malmberg who personally went to Mäntsälä and persuaded the leader of the uprising, K. M. Wallenius, to come with him to Helsinki, thereby dissolving the uprising. After a radio address, the number of the mobilized protection corps members immediately began to be decimated.

=== World War II and the dissolution of the White Guard ===
During the Winter War and the Continuation War, Malmberg served as the commander of the home troops, whose main task was to raise and train new troops, while remaining commander of the White Guard. In the summer of 1944, Mannerheim ordered him to take leave to treat his alcoholism.

Malmberg himself signed the order to disband the White Guard in the autumn of 1944 after the war with the Soviet Union. In accordance with the mandate he had received, he donated the Guard staff's property to the Finnish Red Cross with a deed of gift dated 6 November 1944. A serious illness weakened his strength relatively quickly after the war, and he died in March 1948.

== Honours ==
Malmberg is recipient of the Latvian military Order of Lāčplēsis 2nd class and Lithuanian Riflemen's Star. Malmberg also received Estonian Order of the Cross of the Eagle 1st class and Latvian Order of the Three Stars Grand cross.
