= Congress of Oppressed Nationalities of the Austro-Hungarian Empire =

1918 event in Rome

Congress of Oppressed Nationalities of the Austro-Hungarian Empire Il Congresso delle Nazionalità oppresse dall’Austria-Ungheria (Italian) Kongress der unterdrückten Völker Österreich-Ungarns (German) Az Osztrák-Magyar Birodalom Elnyomott Nemzetiségek Kongresszusa (Hungarian) Kongres potlačenih naroda Austro-Ugarske (Serbo-Croatian) Kongres utlačovaných národů rakousko-uherských (Czech) Congresul Naționalităților Oprimate din Imperiul Austro-Ungar (Romanian) Kongres utláčaných národov Rakúsko-Uhorska (Slovak) Kongres Uciskanych Narodowości Austro-Węgier (Polish) Kongres zatiranih narodnosti Avstro-Ogrske (Slovene)
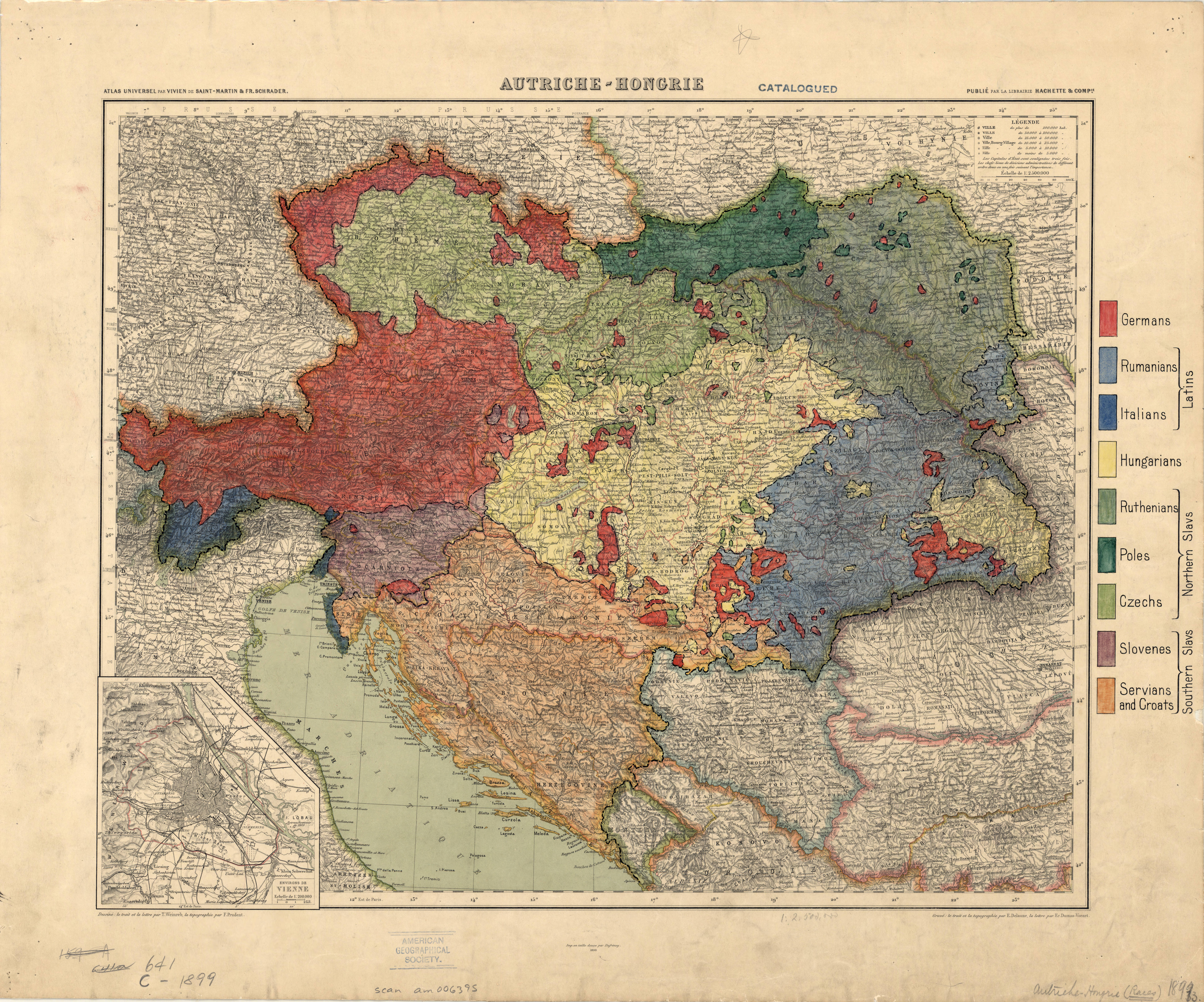
- 1899 ethnographic map of Austria-Hungary
- Host country: Kingdom of Italy
- Date: 8–10 April 1918
- Cities: Rome

Key points
- Entente's support for full self-determination of Yugoslavs, Czechoslovaks, Poles, Romanians and other "oppressed nationalities" [sic] implying upcoming dissolution of Austria-Hungary

The Congress of Oppressed Nationalities of the Austro-Hungarian Empire was held towards the end of the World War I in Rome, Kingdom of Italy, between 8 and 10 April 1918.

== History ==
The event, attended by Czechoslovak, Poles Italian, Yugoslav and Romanian delegations from Austria-Hungary, followed the publication of the Wilson's 14 points and represented the beginning of the real support to the independence movements and the dissolution of Austria-Hungary. Ukrainian or Rusyn delegations were not represented at the Congress, amid Polish–Ukrainian political disagreements over Galicia. The decision to host the event was made after prime ministers of Italy Vittorio Emanuele Orlando and Nikola Pašić of the Kingdom of Serbia became concerned with earlier statement of David Lloyd George that dissolution of the Austria-Hungary is not one of the war aims of his alliance and decided to prioritise self-determination before future border demarcation on the Adriatic Sea. The event rejected Austrophilist proposals on continued existence of the monarchy as a guarantor against violent and exclusive nationalism in the region and instead framed the war as a conflict between democracy and autocracy.

Alongside representatives from affected nationalities, all Entente powers and the United States sent their ambassadors and the Congress concluded that all nationalities fully or partially subjected to Austria-Hungary have a right of full independence. Ceremonial choice was made by the Prime minister Vittorio Emanuele Orlando when he decided to receive the delegation of the future neighboring Yugoslav state before any other delegation at the Congress. Czechoslovak representation was led by Edvard Beneš and Milan Rastislav Štefánik with all Slovak and Czech delegates being a part of the Czechoslovak National Council's delegation. Participant agreed to lay aside any dispute among themselves which would help Central Powers war efforts and which may negatively affect Allied public opinion.

Important precondition for the Italian agreement on hosting the event was reached during the meetings held on 14 and 18 December 1917 at the home of Wickham Steed, where the Yugoslav Committee agreed in principle to accept the subsequent Torre-Trumbić agreement (7 March 1918) on principles of border demarcation between Italy and future Yugoslav state. On 29 May 1918 United States Department of State expressed US government's strong interest in the work of the Congress and honest sympathies for Czechoslovak and Yugoslav national objectives.

== See also ==
- Paris Peace Conference (1919–1920)
- Treaty of Brest-Litovsk of 3 March 1918
- Adriatic question
- Self-determination
- Origins of Czechoslovakia
- Creation of Yugoslavia
- Corfu Declaration
- Union of Transylvania with Romania
- League for Small and Subject Nationalities
- Polish National Committee (1917–1919)
- Little Entente

== Bibliography ==
- G.A.Borgese, Golia. Marcia del fascismo, Mondadori, Milano, 1946, pp. 158-159.
- Giovanni Tassani, Responsabilità e storia. I Paulucci di Calboli sulla scienza del Novecento, ed. Graficamente, 2017, p. 175
- Giovanni Amendola, Il Patto di Roma e la “polemica”, in AA.VV., Il Patto di Roma, Quaderni della Voce, Roma, 1919
