= Moomoo (company) =

Online trading and investment platform

- Developer: Futu
- Release: 2018
- Type: Electronic trading platform
- Website: www.moomoo.com

Moomoo is an online trading and investment platform developed by Futu, a Hong Kong-headquartered financial services group. Launched in the United States in 2018 as the international version of Futu's Futubull platform, Moomoo later expanded to Singapore, Australia, Japan, Canada, Malaysia and New Zealand. The platform is operated by Moomoo Technologies Inc., while brokerage and other regulated financial services are provided through separate Futu subsidiaries in each market.

Depending on the jurisdiction, Moomoo provides access to stocks, exchange-traded funds, options and other investment products, together with market data, research tools, paper trading and educational resources. Its regulated brokerage entities have been subject to disciplinary actions in the United States and Japan.

== History ==
Moomoo was developed by Futu, a Hong Kong online brokerage founded in 2012, as the international version of its Futubull trading platform. Moomoo entered the U.S. online brokerage market in 2018.

Futu launched Moomoo in Singapore in March 2021, the platform's first expansion in Asia. In June 2022, Futu Singapore became the first digital brokerage in Singapore to hold full trading and clearing memberships across the securities and derivatives markets of the Singapore Exchange. Moomoo also launched in Australia in March 2022.

Futu entered Japan in 2022 by acquiring Hibiki Securities, a Japanese brokerage founded in 1920, and subsequently renamed it Moomoo Securities Japan. The Moomoo app launched in Japan that year, initially without securities trading. The Japanese brokerage began offering U.S. stock trading in September 2023. Futu also launched Moomoo in Canada in September 2023.

Moomoo launched brokerage services in Malaysia in February 2024 after receiving a local capital-markets licence. The platform expanded to New Zealand in June 2025.

== Platform and services ==
Moomoo is available through mobile and desktop trading applications. The investments offered vary by market. In the United States, the platform provides trading in U.S. and foreign stocks, exchange-traded funds and options, while its operations in some Asia-Pacific markets also offer access to regional securities and investment funds.

The platform combines order execution with market-data and research tools, including Level 2 quotes, customizable charting, stock and options screeners, financial news and company data. It also provides paper trading, strategy backtesting and educational resources.

== Operating entities and regulation ==
The Moomoo platform is operated by Moomoo Technologies Inc., while brokerage and other regulated financial services are provided through separate Futu subsidiaries in different jurisdictions. In the United States, Moomoo Financial Inc. is registered with the U.S. Securities and Exchange Commission as a broker-dealer and is a member of FINRA, while affiliated Futu Clearing Inc. provides clearing services.

In Singapore, financial services are provided by Moomoo Financial Singapore Pte. Ltd., which holds a Capital Markets Services licence and Major Payment Institution licence from the Monetary Authority of Singapore and has Exempt Financial Adviser status. In Australia, Moomoo Securities Australia Ltd operates under an Australian Financial Services Licence. The same company is registered in New Zealand as an overseas company and as a financial service provider.

In Japan, Moomoo Securities Japan Co., Ltd. is registered as a Financial Instruments Business Operator with the Kanto Local Finance Bureau. Moomoo Financial Canada Inc. is regulated as an Investment Dealer by the Canadian Investment Regulatory Organization. In Malaysia, Moomoo Securities Malaysia Sdn. Bhd. holds Capital Markets Services Licence and is listed by Bursa Malaysia as a participating organisation for equities and a trading participant for derivatives.

== Controversies ==
=== FINRA actions ===
In 2023, Forbes reported on the company's use of finance-focused social-media creators to attract customers. In November 2024, the Financial Industry Regulatory Authority (FINRA) censured Moomoo Financial Inc. and fined it US$750,000 over its supervision of paid influencer communications and customer privacy notices. FINRA found that customers had opened and funded more than 29,000 accounts through referral links supplied to influencers, whose posts included misleading or promissory statements, advertised "zero commission" without adequately disclosing other fees, and in some cases implied that FINRA membership made customers' investments safe. FINRA also found that Moomoo had failed to adequately review and retain records of influencer communications and had not provided required privacy notices to about 456,000 customers. Moomoo settled without admitting or denying the findings and was required to improve its supervisory procedures.

In December 2025, FINRA censured Moomoo Financial again and fined it US$125,000 for deficiencies in its reporting of large options positions. FINRA found that Moomoo lacked an adequate supervisory system and had failed to report thousands of reportable positions. Until March 2023, it had no system for identifying reportable customer positions held in omnibus accounts. Moomoo again settled without admitting or denying the findings.

=== Regulatory action in Japan ===
In June 2026, Japan's Securities and Exchange Surveillance Commission (SESC) reported multiple deficiencies at Moomoo Securities Japan following an inspection. The regulator found that the brokerage had falsely identified at least 77 U.S.-listed ETFs and ETNs as eligible for tax-advantaged NISA accounts; 59 customers subsequently traded 25 of those products through NISA accounts. After the firm stopped presenting the products as NISA-eligible in May 2025 but failed to establish effective controls, it again presented an ineligible U.S.-listed ETF as NISA-eligible between November 2025 and January 2026.

The SESC also found that, from April 2024, the firm had uniformly refused customer requests for outbound transfers of domestic listed stocks, except in tender-offer cases. From September 2024, it had also uniformly refused both incoming and outgoing transfers of publicly offered investment trusts, despite being able to process them. The firm had not reviewed at least 1,531 rejected account applicants to determine whether suspicious-transaction reports were required, and had inadequate cybersecurity and system-risk controls. The SESC said that management had prioritized business expansion and attracting new accounts without providing sufficient resources for compliance and system-risk management.

On June 19, the Kanto Local Finance Bureau imposed a three-month partial business suspension, barring Moomoo Securities Japan from soliciting or accepting new account applications through September 18, 2026. It also issued a business improvement order requiring the firm to strengthen its management, compliance and system-risk controls and address the problems identified in the inspection. On August 26, 2026, the Tokyo Stock Exchange and Osaka Exchange each censured Moomoo Securities Japan and requested that it submit a business improvement report.

=== U.S. data-security scrutiny ===
U.S. scrutiny of Moomoo has formed part of broader concerns about China-linked companies' access to sensitive personal data. Chinese law requires organizations to support and assist state intelligence work, while U.S. national-security authorities have warned that companies subject to Chinese jurisdiction may face government demands for access to data. These concerns are particularly relevant to financial platforms because brokerage firms typically collect identity, tax and financial information from their customers.

In May 2023, Senator Tommy Tuberville and Representative Jim Banks asked the SEC and FINRA to review whether Moomoo and Webull were complying with U.S. rules protecting customer information. The lawmakers cited the platforms' Chinese ownership links and their collection of sensitive information such as Social Security numbers, mailing addresses and financial-account data, raising concerns about the potential exposure of such information to entities in China.

In June 2024, Tennessee prohibited Moomoo from use on state government-issued computers and smartphones, alongside Webull, Tiger Brokers, Futu and digital-assets brokerage Prometheum. The Wall Street Journal reported that the state imposed the restrictions because of concerns that China-linked financial platforms collecting personal information could pose privacy and national-security risks.

Tuberville and Banks renewed their request to the SEC in June 2025, asking the agency to review Moomoo's and Webull's compliance with U.S. securities and data-protection requirements.
