= Tiger Brokers =

Chinese financial services company

UP Fintech Holding Limited
- Trade name: Tiger Brokers
- Native name: 老虎證券
- Type: Public
- Traded as: Nasdaq: TIGR
- Industry: Financial services
- Founded: June 2014; 12 years ago
- Founder: Wu Tianhua
- Headquarters: One Raffles Place, Singapore
- Key people: Wu Tianhua (CEO)
- Revenue: ▲US$612.07 million (2025)
- Net income: ▲US$171.48 million (2025)
- Total assets: ▲US$8.23 billion (2025)
- Total equity: ▲US$865.23 million (2025)
- Number of employees: 1,346 (2025)
- Website: www.itiger.com

UP Fintech Holding Limited (commonly known as Tiger Brokers) is a publicly listed Chinese financial services company headquartered in Singapore. It is known for providing internet securities brokerage services and has been compared to Futu and Robinhood Markets.

== History ==
In June 2014, Tiger Brokers was founded in Beijing by Wu Tianhua who had previously worked at NetEase. Investors of the company include Xiaomi, ZhenFund, Interactive Brokers and Jim Rogers.

Tiger Brokers was known for enabling Chinese investors to trade domestic A-Shares as well as foreign stocks such as those in the US and Hong Kong.

Originally based in mainland China, Tiger Brokers expanded into Hong Kong, Singapore, and Australia.

In 2017, Tiger Brokers started becoming a bookrunner for Chinese companies performing initial public offerings (IPOs)overseas after receiving its US broker licence.

In July 2018, Tiger Brokers reached Unicorn status obtaining a valuation over $1 billion.

In March 2019, Tiger Brokers held its IPO on the Nasdaq to become a listed company.

In June 2021, Tiger Brokers announced plans to launch cryptocurrency trading services.

In December 2022, the China Securities Regulatory Commission (CSRC) stated Tiger Brokers violated domestic laws by allowing customers in mainland China to make cross-border trades. In May 2023, Tiger Brokers announced it would be removing its trading app from the mainland China app store to comply with the CSRC requirements on its cross-border operations in the country. However this was done to stop accepting new customers and the changes would not affect existing customers. Despite this, the stock price of Tiger Brokers surged in 2023 due to interest rates as well as growth from overseas regions such as Singapore, Australia and New Zealand.

In February 2025, Tiger Brokers announced it was integrating DeepSeek’s R1 model into its AI-powered chatbot.

In May 2026, the CSRC announced it will penalize Tiger Brokers for illegally offering mainland China investors access to overseas securities trading without proper regulatory approval. This caused its stock to lose 47% Susquehanna International Group (SIG) took a loss of $71.4 million due to its options contracts. In June 2026, two units of SIG filed a lawsuit in federal court in New York against up to 100 traders claiming timing and nature of the options bets strongly suggested they knew of the event beforehand and were performing insider trading.
