= Futu =

Hong Kong financial technology company

Futu Holdings Limited
- Type: Public
- Traded as: Nasdaq: FUTU
- Industry: Financial services
- Incorporated: Cayman Islands
- Founded: 2012; 14 years ago
- Founder: Leaf Hua Li
- Headquarters: Admiralty, Hong Kong
- Key people: Leaf Hua Li (chairman & CEO); Arthur Yu Chen (CFO)
- Brands: Futubull; Moomoo
- Services: Online brokerage; Margin financing and securities lending; Wealth management; Corporate and institutional services; Digital banking
- Revenue: HK$22.8 billion (US$2.9 billion) (2025)
- Net income: HK$11.3 billion (US$1.5 billion) (2025)
- Total assets: HK$228.4 billion (US$29.3 billion) (2025)
- Total equity: HK$40.3 billion (US$5.2 billion) (2025)
- Number of employees: 3,540 (2025)
- Website: futuholdings.com/en-us

Futu Holdings Limited (Chinese: 富途控股) is a Cayman Islands-incorporated financial technology holding company headquartered in Hong Kong. Through its subsidiaries, it provides online securities brokerage, margin financing and securities lending, wealth management, and corporate and institutional services. Its main digital platforms are Futubull, used primarily in Hong Kong, and Moomoo, its international platform. Its ADR have traded on the Nasdaq since March 2019.

Futu's brokerage business was founded in Hong Kong in 2012 by Leaf Hua Li, an early employee of Tencent, which later became a major shareholder. The group began expanding outside Hong Kong in 2018, with Moomoo becoming the main platform for its international operations. At the end of 2025, Futu had 3.37 million funded accounts and HK$1.23 trillion (US$158.4 billion) in client assets.

Futu's historical cross-border brokerage business serving mainland Chinese investors drew a public warning from the China Securities Regulatory Commission (CSRC) in 2016 and became the subject of direct regulatory action beginning in 2021. In December 2022, the CSRC ordered Futu to stop soliciting new mainland clients and opening new accounts. In May 2026, the CSRC opened a formal investigation and proposed penalties totaling approximately RMB1.85 billion (US$271 million) as part of a broader campaign against unlicensed cross-border financial services. Affected mainland clients were subsequently restricted from making new investments during a two-year transition period.

== History ==
Futu was founded by Leaf Hua Li, an early employee of Tencent who worked at the company for eight years before leaving in 2008. Dissatisfied with the fees and trading systems of existing Hong Kong brokerages, Li invested about HK$40 million of his savings in developing his own online brokerage.

The group's technology operations trace back to Shenzhen Futu Network Technology Co., Ltd., established in December 2007. In April 2012, Li incorporated Futu Securities International (Hong Kong) Limited, which obtained a Type 1 licence from the Securities and Futures Commission and began operating an online brokerage in October. Futu Holdings Limited was incorporated in the Cayman Islands in April 2014, and Futu Securities International was transferred to the holding company the same year.

Futu received funding from Tencent, Matrix Partners China and Sequoia Capital China in three rounds: a Series A round in 2014, a US$60 million Series B round in 2015 and a US$145.5 million Series C round in 2017. Before its public listing, Tencent held about 38.2% of Futu, making it the company's largest institutional shareholder. By 2018, Futu was the fourth-largest online retail broker in Hong Kong by revenue for the first half of the year and had brokered about US$116 billion in trades during the year.

Futu went public on the Nasdaq on March 8, 2019, selling 7.5 million ADR at US$12 each and raising US$90 million. The shares closed their first day of trading at US$15.32, 28% above the offering price, giving Futu a market capitalization of about US$1.7 billion.

Futu's paying client base more than doubled year-on-year by September 2020, reaching 418,000 amid a boom in retail trading and strong demand for Hong Kong IPOs. In August 2020, Futu raised US$313.5 million in its first follow-on offering after the IPO, in part to expand its margin-financing business. By February 2021, its market capitalization had risen to about US$25 billion, roughly fifteen times its valuation after the IPO. In April 2021, Futu raised a further US$1.24 billion to fund margin financing, international expansion and additional licensing.

In December 2022, Futu postponed a planned dual-primary listing in Hong Kong Stock Exchange one day before trading was due to begin.

Futu began expanding outside Hong Kong in 2018, opening a U.S. office and launching its Moomoo platform for U.S. investors later that year. Its overseas expansion accelerated in 2021, when Futu launched Moomoo in Singapore and established its Southeast Asian headquarters there. Moomoo entered Australia in 2022. Futu launched securities trading in Japan and Canada in 2023, followed by Malaysia in 2024. Futu expanded to New Zealand in May 2025.

Futu entered wealth management in 2019 with the launch of Money Plus. Assets under management in the business exceeded US$10 billion in 2024. In June 2024, Futu invested HK$440 million in the parent company of Airstar Bank, acquiring an indirect 44.11% stake in the Hong Kong digital bank. It invested a further HK$500 million in September 2025, increasing its stake to 68.43% and becoming the bank's controlling shareholder. Airstar Bank was renamed Ele Bank in April 2026.

== Business ==
Futu operates its retail brokerage business through the Futubull and Moomoo digital platforms. Futubull is used mainly in Hong Kong, while Moomoo is the group's international platform. Through licensed subsidiaries, Futu provides trading in equities and derivatives, margin financing and securities lending. The platforms also provide market data, financial news, research tools and investor-community features.

Futu distributes wealth-management products under the Money Plus brand through Futubull and Moomoo, including mutual and private funds, bonds and structured products. In Hong Kong, it also provides private-wealth advisory services to affluent clients.

The group provides corporate and institutional services under Futu I&E, including IPO distribution, investor relations and marketing, employee stock ownership plan (ESOP) administration and institutional trading. Futu also controls Ele Bank, a Hong Kong digital bank. In Hong Kong, Futu Securities offers cryptocurrency trading, while its PantherTrade subsidiary operates a virtual-asset trading platform licensed by the SFC.

== Financials ==
Futu's revenue increased from HK$10.0 billion in 2023 to HK$13.6 billion in 2024 and HK$22.8 billion (US$2.9 billion) in 2025. Net income rose from HK$4.3 billion in 2023 to HK$5.4 billion in 2024 and HK$11.3 billion in 2025. At the end of 2025, Futu had 3.37 million funded accounts and HK$1.23 trillion (US$158.4 billion) in client assets.

In 2025, brokerage commissions and handling charges generated HK$10.57 billion, or 46.3% of revenue, while interest income was HK$10.44 billion, or 45.7%. Other income totaled HK$1.83 billion. Interest income is derived mainly from bank deposits, securities lending and margin financing, while other income includes fund distribution and currency-exchange services.

== Corporate structure and ownership ==
Futu Holdings Limited is a Cayman Islands holding company rather than an operating company. The group's financial-services businesses are conducted through subsidiaries, including Futu Securities International in Hong Kong and locally regulated Moomoo-branded brokerages in overseas markets.

Because Chinese regulations restrict foreign ownership of companies engaged in certain internet-related businesses, Futu conducts some of its mainland China operations through a variable interest entity (VIE) structure. Shenzhen Futu Network Technology and Haikou Futu Information Services are owned 85% by Leaf Hua Li and 15% by his wife, Lei Li, but are subject to contractual arrangements with Futu's wholly owned Chinese subsidiary Shensi Network Technology (Beijing). These arrangements allow Futu to consolidate the VIEs without owning equity interests in them. The VIEs accounted for 0.1% of the group's revenue in 2025.

Futu has a dual-class share structure, with each Class A share carrying one vote and each Class B share carrying 20 votes. As of March 31, 2026, Li beneficially owned 36.0% of Futu's shares and controlled 63.0% of its voting power, while Tencent-affiliated entities held 20.2% of the shares and 30.8% of the voting power. Li and Huang River Investment Limited, a wholly owned subsidiary of Tencent, held all Class B shares, representing 31.7% of Futu's share capital but 90.3% of its voting power.

== Controversies ==
=== Mainland China cross-border brokerage ===
In July 2016, the China Securities Regulatory Commission (CSRC) named Futu Network among online platforms providing mainland investors with access to overseas securities and warned that it had not approved such services outside authorised cross-border investment channels.

Regulatory pressure intensified in 2021. In October, Sun Tianqi, head of the Financial Stability Department of the People's Bank of China, said that online brokerages without a mainland Chinese licence were operating illegally if they served mainland clients over the internet. The CSRC subsequently said that it had met executives from Futu and Tiger Brokers in November 2021 and instructed them to bring their mainland cross-border business into compliance with Chinese law.

On December 30, 2022, the CSRC said that Futu and Tiger Brokers had provided cross-border securities services to mainland investors without its approval and ordered them to stop soliciting new mainland clients and opening new accounts. Existing clients could continue trading, but the brokers could not accept new funds transferred in violation of China's foreign-exchange controls. In May 2023, Futu removed Futubull from mainland Chinese app stores in response to the CSRC's requirements, while existing mainland clients could continue using the platform.

In May 2026, the CSRC and seven other government agencies launched a two-year campaign against unlicensed cross-border securities, futures and fund services conducted in mainland China. As part of the campaign, the CSRC opened an investigation into Futu and said that related Futu entities had provided securities brokerage, fund sales and futures services in mainland China without the required licences or approvals. The CSRC proposed penalties totaling approximately RMB1.85 billion (US$271 million), including confiscation of illegal gains and fines. The pre-notification letter also proposed a personal fine of RMB1.25 million for Li. As of late May 2026, neither the corporate nor personal penalties were final, and they remained subject to further proceedings and a final CSRC decision.

Beginning June 12, 2026, affected mainland clients could sell existing holdings and withdraw funds but could not add to their positions or transfer new funds into their accounts. The CSRC said that existing accounts would not be forcibly closed and client assets would not be subject to mandatory liquidation. The broader rectification campaign was planned to run for two years. At the end of the first quarter of 2026, mainland China accounted for about 13% of Futu's funded accounts.

=== Other regulatory issues ===
In filings from 2019 and 2022, Futu disclosed inquiries and investigations by Hong Kong's Securities and Futures Commission (SFC) concerning matters including client onboarding, risk management, client assets, cybersecurity and anti-money-laundering controls. Futu acknowledged that some of its historical online account-opening procedures had not strictly followed methods specified in SFC guidance and introduced new e-certification procedures in September 2021. The company has said that it has not been subject to disciplinary action over its online account-opening procedures.

In February 2025, the National Futures Association (NFA) fined Futu Futures Inc. US$100,000 for late monthly financial reports and notices of material changes, as well as failures to supervise employees and agents. Futu settled the case without admitting or denying the allegations and was ordered to cease and desist from further violations.
