= Aino Malmberg =

Finnish writer and politician (1865–1933)

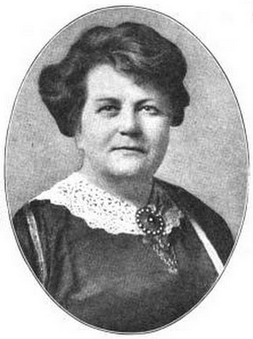
- Aino Malmberg, from a 1917 publication.
- Born: Aino Emma Wilhelmina Perenius; February 24, 1865; Hollola
- Died: February 3, 1933 (aged 67); Helsinki
- Children: Lauri Malmberg; Erik Malmberg

Aino Emma Wilhelmina Malmberg née Perenius (February 24, 1865 – February 3, 1933) was a Finnish writer and politician.

Malmberg was born in Hollola to Pastor John Perenius and Edla Olivia Björkstén. She took her matriculation examination in 1884 and graduated from the University of Helsinki in 1886. Malmberg then worked as an English teacher at various schools, and from 1898 to 1908 at the Finnish Business Institute.

Malmberg had to leave Finland in 1910 to England because of her participation in the fight against the Russian government. She represented the Independent Labour Party at the eighth congress of the Second International at Copenhagen in 1910. She returned to Finland upon the country's independence in 1917.

In 1912 Malmberg wrote "Woman Suffrage in Finland".

Malmberg was married from 1887 to 1910 to lecturer Emil Othniel Malmberg. They had three sons, Lauri Malmberg, Erik Malmberg and Olavi Malmberg.

Malmberg died in Helsinki.

== Works ==
- Tien ohesta tempomia. Otava 1901
- Totta ja leikkiä. Otava 1903
- Yksinkö? Otava 1903
- Maailmaa kierrellessä. Rosma, Helsinki 1922
- Voimakasta väkeä. Otava 1926
- Voimatonta väkeä. Otava 1927
- Suomi Australiassa : matkahavaintoja. Otava 1929
- Johtajia. Otava 1933
