= Epaminonda Lucaciu =

Father Epaminonda Lucaciu
- Born: February 25, 1877; Sâncrai, Austria-Hungary
- Died: July 29, 1960 (aged 83); Cluj
- Education: Pontificio Collegio Urbano de Propaganda Fide
- Occupation: Priest
- Church: Romanian Greek Catholic Church

Epaminonda Lucaciu (February 25, 1877 - July 29, 1960) was a Romanian Greek Catholic priest who was the first Romanian priest sent to the United States of America.

== Life ==
The son of Vasile Lucaciu, Epaminonda Lucaciu received a scholarship to study at the Pontificio Collegio Urbano de Propaganda Fide Fide in Rome, Italy.

On the 19th of November 1905, Lucaciu established Saint Helena Romanian Byzantine Catholic Church. Lucaciu served at the parish until 1907.
