= Frederic C. Howe =

American politician and author (1867–1940)

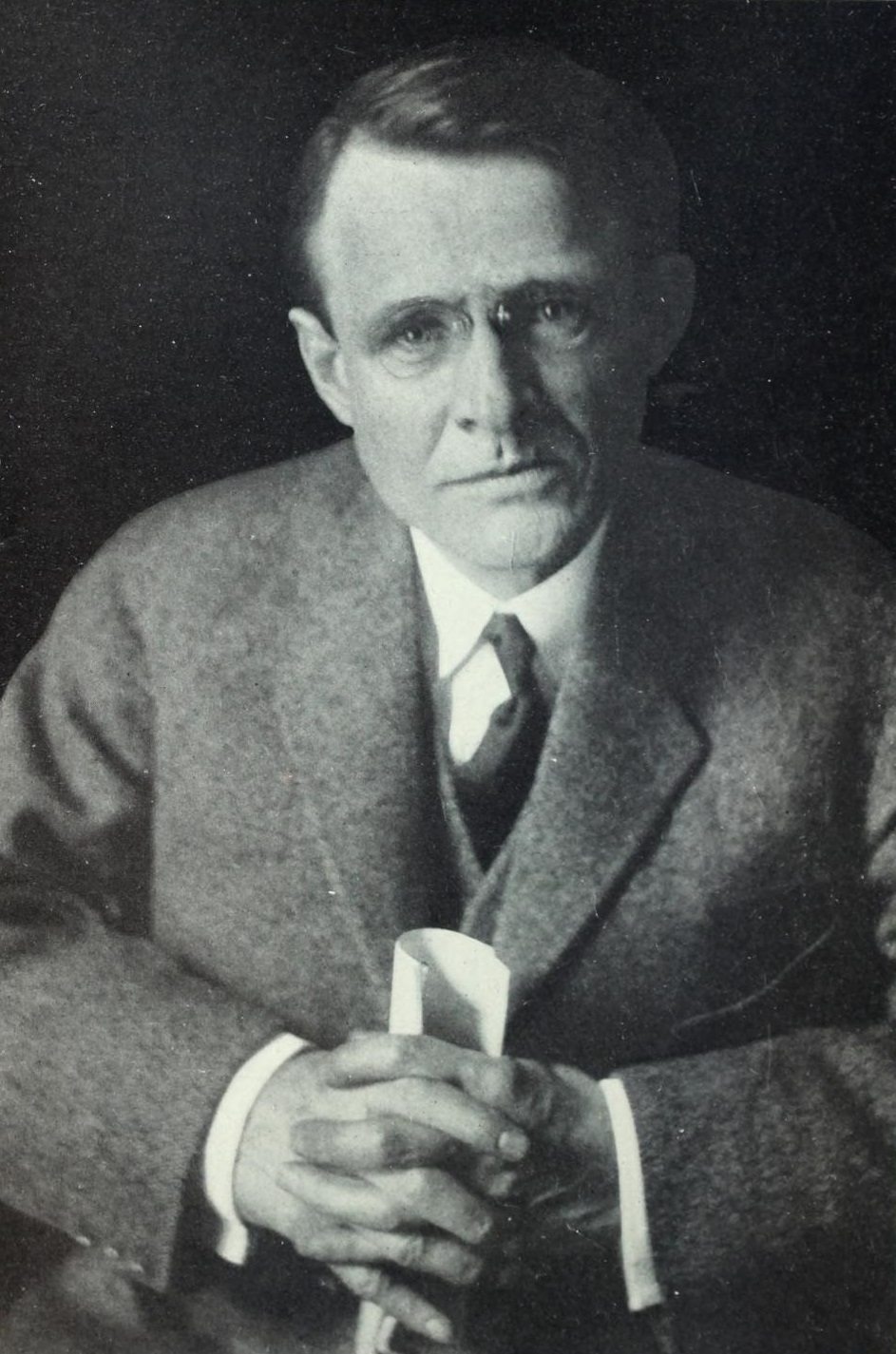

Ohio state senate
- In office 1903–1907

Personal details
- Born: Frederic Clemson Howe; November 21, 1867 Meadville, Pennsylvania
- Died: August 3, 1940 (aged 72)
- Party: Republican (until 1903); Democrat (after 1903)
- Spouse: Marie Jenney Howe
- Education: New York Law School; Johns Hopkins University; Allegheny College
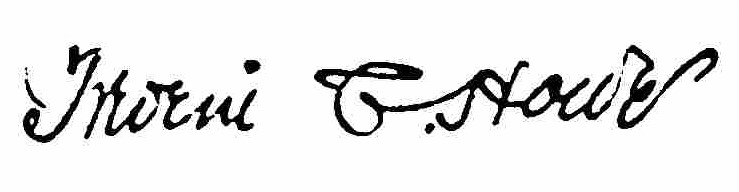
- Signature

Frederic Clemson Howe (November 21, 1867 – August 3, 1940) was a progressive era reform politician and author who served one term as a member of the Ohio Senate (1903–1907) before becoming managing director of the People's Institute in New York City in 1910 and Commissioner of Immigration of the Port of New York in 1914. He was also founder and president of the League of Small and Subject Nationalities.

The author of 17 books in his lifetime, Howe is recognized as the originator of the well-known phrase "big business" in 1905.

== Biography ==
=== Early years ===
Fred Howe was born in Meadville, Pennsylvania on November 21, 1867.

He received a bachelor's degree from Allegheny College in 1889 and a Ph.D. from Johns Hopkins University in 1892. He also attended the University of Halle in Germany as well as University of Maryland Law School and New York Law School.

=== Cleveland years ===
After graduation from law school, Howe relocated to Cleveland, Ohio, where he became a partner in the firm of Garfield, Garfield & Howe. Availing himself of his PhD, Howe also taught at Cleveland Law School on corporation and taxation matters. It was at this time that he became a committed adherent of the single-tax theory propounded by the economist Henry George.

In 1900, as a member of the Cleveland Municipal Association, Howe gained public attention as the author of a bill placing the expenditures of Cuyahoga County board of commissioners under increased scrutiny by requiring all contracts to gain approval of the county solicitor, with all proposals over $500 publicly advertised. Previously only contracts over $1,000 were scrutinized, with larger jobs frequently split into $1,000 pieces to elude oversight.

Long interested in matters of taxation and urban planning, Howe entered politics in 1901, standing in the February Republican primary as one of three candidates for Cleveland City Council in the city's 4th District. Howe won the primary and then defeated his Democratic opponent in the April general election, winning office in the same election that brought in reform mayor Tom L. Johnson, a Democrat. The two proved to be kindred spirits, with Howe broadly supportive of the new mayor's proposals for reforms to ensure honest and economical government, municipal ownership of public property, and a reduced 3-cent streetcar fare.

Embarrassment ensued early in 1902 when the national magazine The World's Work enlisted the Cleveland progressive Republican council member to write an article on the new Cleveland progressive Democratic mayor, emphasizing his innovative reform proposals. Howe agreed, provided his name was not used in the piece indicating authorship. Unfortunately, there was a breakdown in communication during the layout process and a byline was added, with 100,000 copies produced before the error was noticed. Although the magazine told Howe they would pulp the entire press run if he insisted, after 24 hours consideration Howe allowed release of the issue unchanged. A mass of printed magazines were saved, but Howe's political future as a Republican was effectively ruined.

Defeated in his bid for reelection to the Cleveland city council in 1903, the progressive Republican Howe switched political parties and ran for Ohio State Senate as a Democrat in the fall of that year, winning a seat. As a state senator, Howe gained a reputation of his own as a clean-government reformer when he took a leading role in exposing corruption in the Ohio state treasurer's office.

In 1904, he married Marie Jenney, a Unitarian minister and activist in the woman suffrage movement.

In 1905, he published The City: the Hope of Democracy, which the Oxford English Dictionary cites as the first use of the term "big business".

Howe was elected to the Cleveland board of assessors in 1909, in which capacity he was able to adapt some of the precepts of George's single-tax theory to local policy.

=== New York years ===
Crowd for a lecture of the People's Institute, held in the great hall of the Cooper Union, New York City, 1914.

Howe and his wife moved to New York City in 1910 where Howe took over for the recently deceased Charles Sprague Smith as director of the People's Institute, a civic education project targeted towards immigrants and centered around facilities of the Cooper Union for the Advancement of Science and Art. The People's Institute, while not formally affiliated with the Cooper Union, made use of the school's facilities after hours for the conducting of evening classes and public lectures on social and cultural themes, seeking to integrate the steady stream of immigrants through the Port of New York into American society.

According to Howe, the People's Institute was conceived around the founding idea that "freedom of discussion and contact of persons of divergent interests would aid in the solution of many social problems." Not only did the institute provide a forum "for discussion in which progressive, ethical, political, and social views can be voiced," Howe added, but it had also come to fulfill a social function, organizing the use of school buildings as social centers for music, dance, and education.

During Howe's tenure as managing director, the People's Institute also emerged as one of the United States' leading film censorship organizations through its direct administration of the National Board of Censorship of Motion Pictures, which controlled the content of 16,000 theaters across the country. The board, which saw itself as fulfilling the role of guardian of public morals, claimed responsibiility for the banning through withdrawal of 53 films and for forcing cuts in 401 others in 1913.

Howe remained as managing director of the People's Institute until resigning in 1914. During his time at the head of the organization, the institute expanded its programs through the establishment of the People's Music League and the Drama League of America, in addition to continuing to conduct its program of classes, social clubs, and educational lectures.

Howe also spent his New York years honing his craft as a writer on public themes, focusing on the efficient organization of cities and approaches to the amelioration of urban problems as well as to issues arising as a result of World War I. Over the decade of the 1910s Howe finished approximately one volume a year, with his work published by the prominent New York literary firm Charles Scribner's Sons.

In 1914, Howe was named Commissioner of immigration for the Port of New York. It was in this capacity that Howe was targeted in 1919 as part of an anarchist bombing spree, but was unharmed.

=== Washington, DC years ===
On 27 July 1933, George N. Peek, head of the Agricultural Adjustment Administration, appointed Howe as the head of the Consumers' Counsel. He left that position in 1935 to become a special assistant to Secretary of Agriculture Henry A. Wallace. In 1940 he went to work on the staff of the federal monopoly committee.

Howe was also founder and president of the League of Small and Subject Nationalities.

=== Death and legacy ===
In July 1940, the 72-year old Howe traveled to Chilmark, Massachusetts to visit the home of his friend, Roger Baldwin, top official of the American Civil Liberties Union. He fell ill there, however, dying in Oak Bluffs, Massachusetts on August 3.

Howe is buried in Meadville, Pennsylvania.

Rexford Tugwell claimed that Howe was "the subject of vitriolic attacks by the business interests" and was "pictured as a Red". Chester R. Davis now decided to get rid of Howe. He later recalled: "Fred Howe was a man of high ideals and very little practical sense. He was the 'turn the other cheek' type. He was a well-meaning man who permitted his organization to be loaded down with a group of people who were more concerned with stirring up discontent than they were with achieving the objectives of the act."

== Works ==
- Taxation and Taxes in the United States Under the Internal Revenue System, 1791–1895. Philadelphia: Thomas Y. Crowell & Co., 1896.
- The City of Cleveland in Relation to the Street Railway Question. Cleveland, OH: Municipal Association of Cleveland, 1897. (pamphlet)
- The City: The Hope of Democracy. New York: Charles Scribner's Sons, 1905.
- The Confessions of a Monopolist. Chicago: Public Publishing Co., 1906. (fiction)
- The British City: The Beginnings of Democracy. New York: Charles Scribner's Sons, 1907.
- Privilege and Democracy in America. New York: Charles Scribner's Sons, 1910.
- Wisconsin: An Experiment in Democracy. New York: Charles Scribner's Sons, 1912.
- European Cities at Work. New York: Charles Scribner's Sons, 1913.
- The Modern City and Its Problems. New York: Charles Scribner's Sons, 1914.
- Socialized Germany. New York: Charles Scribner's Sons, 1915.
- Why War. New York: Charles Scribner's Sons, 1916.
- The High Cost of Living. New York: Charles Scribner's Sons, 1917.
- The Only Possible Peace. New York: Charles Scribner's Sons, 1919.
- The Land and the Soldier. New York: Charles Scribner's Sons, 1919.
- Denmark: A Cooperative Commonwealth. New York: Harcourt, Brace and World, 1921.
- Revolution and Democracy. New York: B.W. Huebsch, 1921.
- The Confessions of a Reformer. New York: Charles Scribner's Sons, 1925. (memoir)

Articles

- "Industrial Democracy in Europe" (five articles), The Outlook, vol. 104 (Jan. 15; Jan. 26; Feb. 26; March 26; April 23, 1910).
- "City Building in Germany," Scribner’s Magazine, vol. 47, no. 5 (1910), pp. 601–614.
- "Düsseldorf: A City of Tomorrow," Hampton’s Magazine, vol. 25, no. 6 (1910), pp. 687–709.
- "A Way Toward the Model City," The World’s Work, Dec. 1910, pp. 13794–13801.
- "The German and the American City," Scribner’s Magazine, vol. 49, no. 4 (1911), pp. 485–492.
- "The City as a Socializing Agency: The Physical Basis of the City: The City Plan." American Journal of Sociology, vol. 17, no. 5 (1912), pp. 590–601. JSTOR 2762883.
- "What To Do with the Motion-Picture Show: Shall It Be Censored? The Outlook, vol. 107 (June 20, 1914), pp. 412–416.
