= Whites (Finland) =

Anti-communist faction of the Finnish Civil War (1918)

Finland: Suomi (Finnish); Finland (Swedish)
- 1917–1918
- Blue: "White Finland"; Red: Red Finland (March 1918)
- Capital: Helsinki; Vaasa (de facto, 29 January – 3 May 1918)
- Official languages: Finnish; Swedish

Government
  - Chairman of the Senate of Finland: Pehr Evind Svinhufvud
  - Commander-in-Chief of the White Army: Carl Gustaf Emil Mannerheim
- Legislature: Senate of Finland
- Historical era: World War I; Finnish Civil War
  - Finnish Declaration of Independence: 6 December 1917
  - Victory over the Reds in the Finnish Civil War: 15 May 1918
  - Regency established: 18 May 1918
- Currency: Markka
| Preceded by | Succeeded by |
| Grand Duchy of Finland | Kingdom of Finland |
- Today part of: Finland; Russia

White Finland is the informal name for the part of Finland controlled by the Finnish government, the Senate, during the Finnish Civil War of 1918. Its forces, known as the White Guard, led by Carl Gustaf Emil Mannerheim, fought against the forces of the rival Finnish Socialist Workers' Republic, known as the "Reds".

At the start of the civil war, the Whites controlled the majority of Finland's territory, chiefly its central and northern areas. These were largely rural areas however, and most industrial centres, including the capital of Helsinki, were under Red control, forcing the senate to relocate to the coastal city of Vaasa. Imperial German support, coupled with a comparatively lacklustre Soviet support for the Finnish Reds helped the Finnish Whites ultimately win the short but brutal civil war. The Whites also enjoyed support from Swedish and Estonian volunteers, as well as the Polish Legion in Finland and some Russian White Guards.

"White Finland" would end with the decision to proclaim Finland as a kingdom, with Prince Frederick Charles of Hesse as its monarch. He would never officially assume the throne however, renouncing it after Germany's defeat in World War I, after which the decision was made to establish a republic, which has lasted to this day.

== Background ==
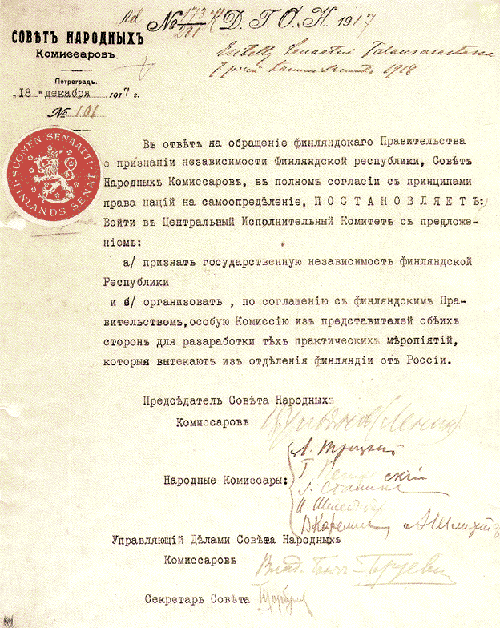
The decision of the Soviet of the People's Comissars' to recognise Finnish independence, signed by Vladimir Lenin, Leon Trotsky, Grigory Petrovsky, Joseph Stalin, Isaac Steinberg, Vladimir Karelin and Alexander Schlichter.

On November 15 1917, following the October Revolution, the Finnish Parliament declared itself the holder of supreme power in Finland. The government (Senate of Finland), led by the conservative Pehr Evind Svinhufvud, presented a declaration of independence, which the Parliament approved on 6 December 1917. On 31 December, Soviet Russia, led by Vladimir Lenin, recognized it.

After the civil war started on 27 January 1918 and the Reds captured Helsinki, the government operated from Vaasa in Ostrobothnia.

The Whites had no clear political aims in common, other than stopping the communist revolutionary Reds from taking power and returning to constitutional rule by a Senate (the government of the Grand Duchy of Finland) which was formed by the non-socialist parties of the Eduskunta (parliament) and returning to the Rule of Law. The provisional head of state of White Finland was Pehr Evind Svinhufvud, chairman of the senate at the time, and its military was commanded by Carl Gustaf Emil Mannerheim. The Conservative Senate government was supported by the remnants of the Finnish Legion stationed along the eastern front.

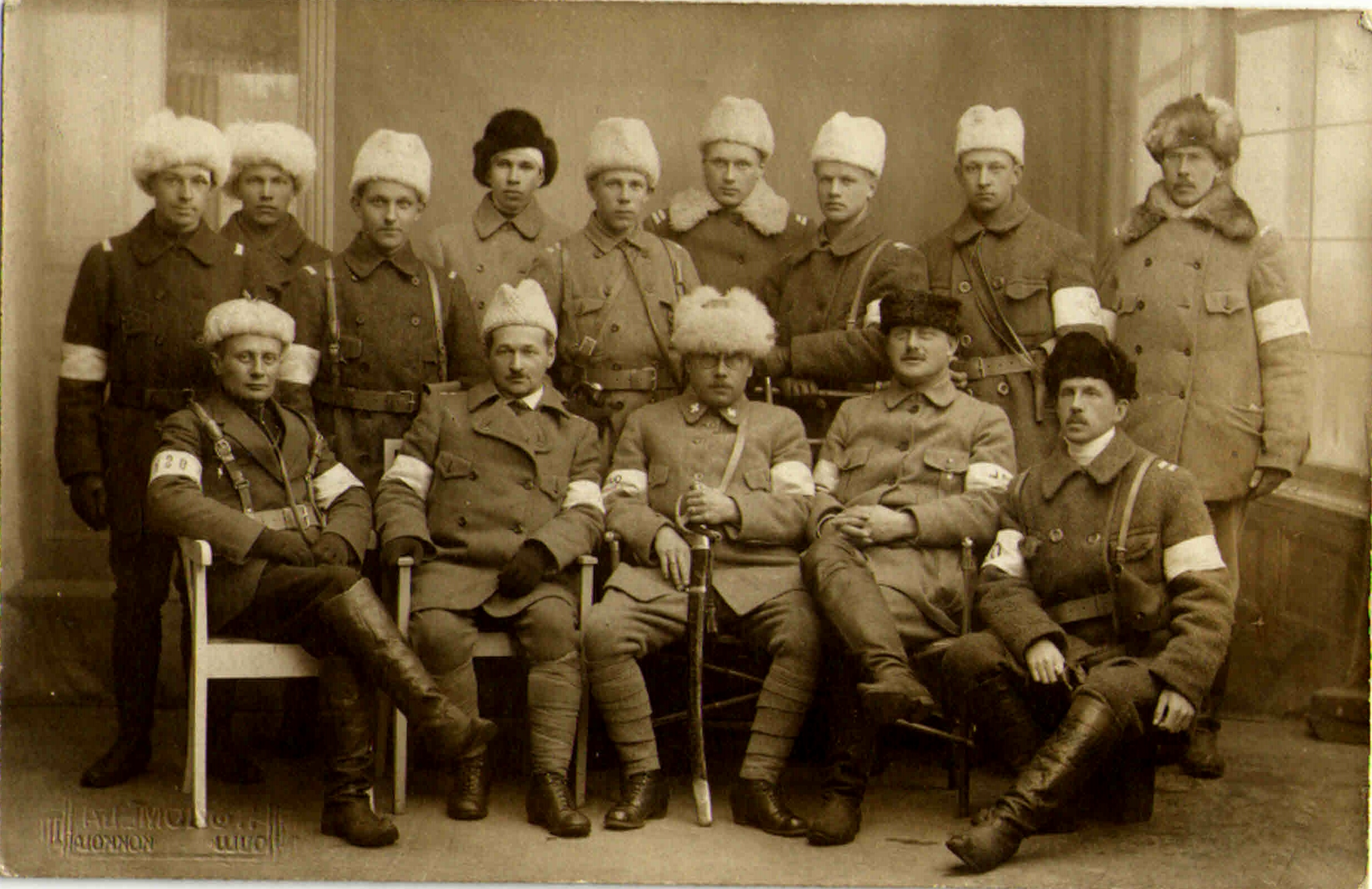
Protection Corpsmen in Oulu, 1918.

The main fighting force of the 'White Army' was the White Guard, (officially known as the Civil Guard) which was a volunteer army mostly made up of the rural peasant and lower classes, as they made up around 77% of the entire protection corps fighting units. The Protection Corps had around 15,000 men in their ranks, and with conscription enforced, the numbers of the 'White Army' rose to around 60,000 men in total, with the conscription numbers, the working class become to consist of around 25% of the frontline troops.

The Jägers were recruited by Imperial Germany between 1914 and 1917 for military training, even participating alongside their German benefactors, in combat against the Russian forces on the Eastern Front, before returning to Finland for the upcoming civil war. Because Russia did not draft Finns for combat duties, their experience as First World War veterans had significant impact during the war. They received arms and equipment matching those of regular German troops, and sporadic further military support from the German Empire.

The White Army did not only just consist of Finnish men, however they also gained the support of foreign groups and voluntary military organizations, such as the 'Friends of Finland' group in Sweden, which organized and equipped Swedish volunteers to fight in Finland, this came with Swedish officers such as Ernst Linder, who came to command the Satakunta Group. The Whites also found sympathy from the Poles and Estonians, who also served as volunteers in combat.

== Campaign ==
The Whites' campaign was initially challenged by the goal of capturing the Varkaus industrial center. The around 1,200 Red guardsmen who were controlling the city finally surrendered after the White troops secured the surrounding areas. This battle was one of the turning points of the civil war since it gave the Whites control of the northern part of Finland. The success of the campaign is attributed to the White's better equipment, organization, and unity.

By February 1917, Finland was already divided with the Whites controlling the area north of Pori, Tampere, Lahti, Lappeenranta, and Viipuri while the urban areas to the south were under the Red zone. With the assistance of the Germans under General Rüdiger von der Goltz, the Whites were able to capture Helsinki and Tampere until the Reds finally fled to Soviet Russia in April, and the victors inherited the borders of the former Grand Duchy. The initial frontlines were established rather quickly, and over the course of the war, Whites reclaimed all Finnish territory. The Finnish constitution of 1919 established the modern Republic of Finland, and the Treaty of Tartu between Finland and Russia (1920) confirmed the outcome.

== Politics ==
The politics of the White side in Finland during the Finnish Civil War were generally conservative, anti-socialist, and focused on maintaining order and independence. The Whites were led politically by the Senate under Pehr Evind Svinhufvud and represented a coalition of non-socialist groups, including conservatives, liberals, and agrarian interests. Their main political goal was to defend the newly declared independence of Finland (December 1917) and to prevent a socialist revolution like the one taking place in Russia. They supported a system based on law, private property, and parliamentary governance, although many within the White leadership favored a strong executive power to stabilize the country during and after the conflict. A significant faction also supported establishing a monarchy, and in 1918 Finland briefly moved toward becoming a kingdom with a German prince as king. The Whites were strongly anti-communist and anti-socialist, opposing the Red movement, which they saw as a threat to social order and national independence. They also relied on support from Germany, both politically and militarily, which influenced their policies during the war. Socially, the White movement tended to represent landowners, the middle and upper classes, and rural farmers, though it also included broader segments of society who opposed the Reds. After their victory, the White-led government reasserted control over Finland, but the aftermath included political repression and divisions, which shaped Finnish politics for years to come.

=== Cabinet (1917–1918) ===
| Portfolio | Minister | Took office | Left office | Party |
|---|---|---|---|---|
| Chairman of the Senate | Pehr Evind Svinhufvud | November 27, 1918 | May 27, 1918 | Young Finnish |
| Head of the Department for Justice | Onni Talas | November 27, 1918 | May 27, 1918 | Young Finnish |
| Head of the Department for Internal Affairs | Arthur Castrén | November 27, 1918 | May 27, 1918 | Young Finnish |
| Deputy Head of the Department for Internal Affairs | Alexander Frey | November 27, 1918 | May 27, 1918 | RKP |
| Head of the Financial Affairs Department | Juhani Arajärvi | November 27, 1918 | May 27, 1918 | Finnish |
| Head of the Department for Education and Ecclesiastical Affairs | Emil Nestor Setälä | November 27, 1918 | May 27, 1918 | Young Finnish |
| Head of the Department for Agriculture | Kyösti Kallio | November 27, 1918 | May 27, 1918 | Agrarian |
| Deputy Head of the Department for Agriculture | Eero Yrjö Pehkonen | November 27, 1918 | May 27, 1918 | Agrarian |
| Head of the Department for Transport and Public Works | Jalmar Castrén | November 27, 1918 | May 27, 1918 | Young Finnish |
| Head of the Department for Trade and Industry | Heikki Gabriel Renvall | November 27, 1918 | May 27, 1918 | Young Finnish |
| Head of the Department for Social Affairs | Oskari Wilho Louhivuori | November 27, 1918 | May 27, 1918 | Finnish |

==== Other Members ====
Military leadership:

- Carl Gustaf Emil Mannerheim – Commander-in-Chief of the White Army

Term: January 1918 – May 1918

- Karl Fredrik Wilkama – Senior General/Chief of Operations

Term: January 1918 – May 1918

- Ernst Löfström – Field Commander (regional forces)

Term: January 1918 – May 1918

- Hjalmar Siilasvuo – Battalion Commander

Term: January 1918 – May 1918
German Military support: (not officially part of the cabinet)

- Rüdiger von der Goltz – Commander of the Baltic Sea Division

Term in Finland: April 1918 – December 1918

=== Military ===
The military of the White side in Finland during the Finnish Civil War was formed from a combination of local militias, trained officers, and foreign support, which together became the foundation of the Finnish national army. At the core were the White Guards (Suojeluskunta), originally local volunteer militias organized for security and anti-revolutionary purposes. These units were strongest in rural and northern areas and formed the backbone of the White forces. At the start of the war, they were loosely organized, but they were gradually unified under a central command. Leadership was provided by Carl Gustaf Emil Mannerheim, who served as Commander-in-Chief. He established a structured command system and turned the scattered militias into a more disciplined and coordinated army. Many officers had prior experience in the Russian Imperial Army, which helped improve training and organization. An important element of the White military was the Jägers, Finnish volunteers who had been trained in Germany during World War I. They returned to Finland during the war and became key officers and instructors, strengthening the army's effectiveness. The Whites also received significant military support from Germany, including troops, weapons, and logistical assistance. German intervention, especially in southern Finland, played a major role in the final phase of the war. The White military conducted organized campaigns against the Red forces, capturing major and strategic cities. Over time, it developed into a more conventional army with defined units, ranks, and supply systems. After the war, this force became the basis of the official Finnish Defence Forces, marking the transition from a volunteer militia movement to a national military institution.

== See also ==
- Political terror in Finland and Baltic States after World War I
