= Castrén =

Castrén is the surname of a Finnish family. Notable members include:

- Aarne Castrén (1923–1997), Finnish Olympic sailor
- Arthur Castrén (1866–1946), Finnish politician
- Garth Castrén (born 1939), Finnish diplomat
- Inga-Brita Castrén (1919–2003), Finnish theologian
- Jalmar Castrén (1873–1946), Finnish politician
- Jonas Castrén (1850–1922), Finnish lawyer and politician
- Kaarlo Castrén (1860–1938), Finnish lawyer and politician, briefly Prime Minister of Finland
- Klaus Castrén (1923–2011), Finnish diplomat
- Maaret Castrén (born 1959), Finnish politician
- Matthias Castrén (1813–1852), Finnish ethnologist and philologist
- Matilda Castren (born 1995), Finnish professional golfer
- Mauno Castrén (1931–2021), Finnish diplomat
- Natalia Castrén (1830–1881), Finnish culture personality and salon hostess
- Urho Castrén (1886–1965), President of the Supreme Administrative Court of Finland, briefly Prime Minister of Finland
