= Juho Kusti Paasikivi's first senate =

Finland's second government (1918)

Paasikivi I Senate
- 2nd Cabinet of Finland
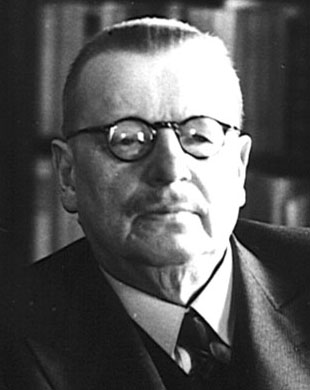
- Juho Paasikivi
- Date formed: 27 May 1918
- Date dissolved: 27 November 1918

People and organisations
- Chairman: Juho Kusti Paasikivi
- No. of ministers: 10
- Ministers removed: 5 resigned
- Total no. of members: 15
- Member parties: Old Finns; Young Finns; RKP; Agrarian League

History
- Predecessor: Svinhufvud I
- Successor: Ingman I

Juho Kusti Paasikivi's first senate was the second Senate and de facto Government of independent Finland. Its time period was May 27, 1918 – November 27, 1918.

Two members of the Finnish Party and the Swedish Party's Alexander Frey resigned from the Government in June 1918. The Agrarian League's two senators resigned in August 1918 because the Young Finnish Party's campaign of monarchy was very active. In November 1918, following the surrender of Germany and the end of World War I, the Parliament of Finland adopted the republican form of state and the Senate of Finland was abolished and substituted officially by the new Finnish Government.

== Assembly ==
The following table displays the Senate's composition:

Portfolio	Minister	Took office	Left office	Party
Vicechairman of the Senate	Juho Kusti Paasikivi	May 27, 1918	November 27, 1918	Young Finnish
Head of the Department for Foreign Affairs	Otto Stenroth	May 27, 1918	November 27, 1918	Young Finnish
Head of the Department for Justice	Onni Talas	May 27, 1918	November 27, 1918	Young Finnish
Head of the Department for Internal Affairs	Arthur Castrén	May 27, 1918	November 27, 1918	Young Finnish
Deputy Head of the Department for Internal Affairs	Alexander Frey	May 27, 1918	June 29, 1918	RKP
Head of the Department for Military Affairs	Vilhelm Aleksander Thesleff	May 27, 1918	November 27, 1918	Public servant
Head of the Financial Affairs Department	Juhani Arajärvi	May 27, 1918	November 27, 1918	Finnish
Head of the Department for Education and Ecclesiastical Affairs	Emil Nestor Setälä	May 27, 1918	November 27, 1918	Young Finnish
Head of the Department for Agriculture	Kyösti Kallio	May 27, 1918	August 17, 1918	Agrarian
Deputy Head of the Department for Agriculture	Eero Yrjö Pehkonen	May 27, 1918	August 17, 1918	Agrarian
Head of the Department for Transport and Public Works	Jalmar Castrén	May 27, 1918	November 27, 1918	Young Finnish
Head of the Department for Trade and Industry	Heikki Gabriel Renvall	May 27, 1918	November 27, 1918	Young Finnish
Head of the Department for Social Affairs	Oskari Wilho Louhivuori	May 27, 1918	June 29, 1918	Finnish
Head of the Food Supply Department	Hjalmar Gabriel Paloheimo	May 27, 1918	November 27, 1918	Finnish
Member of the Senate without portfolio	Samuli Sario	May 27, 1918	June 29, 1918	Finnish

Preceded by Svinhufvud I	Senate of Finland; May 27, 1918 – November 27, 1918	Succeeded by Ingman I
