= Finnish Declaration of Independence =

1917 resolution declaring independence from Russia

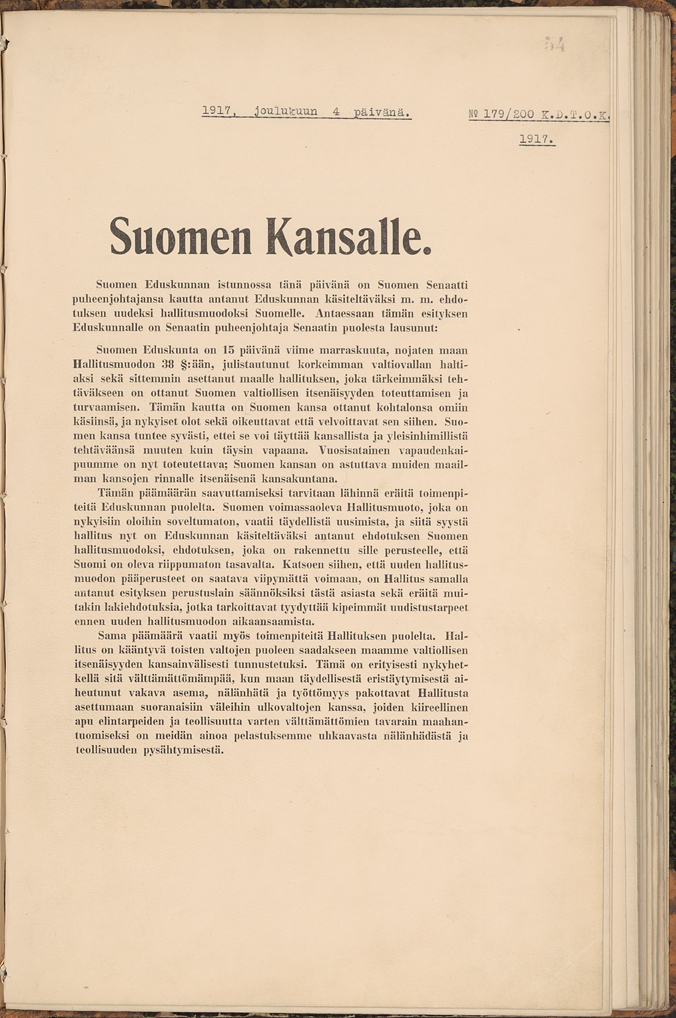
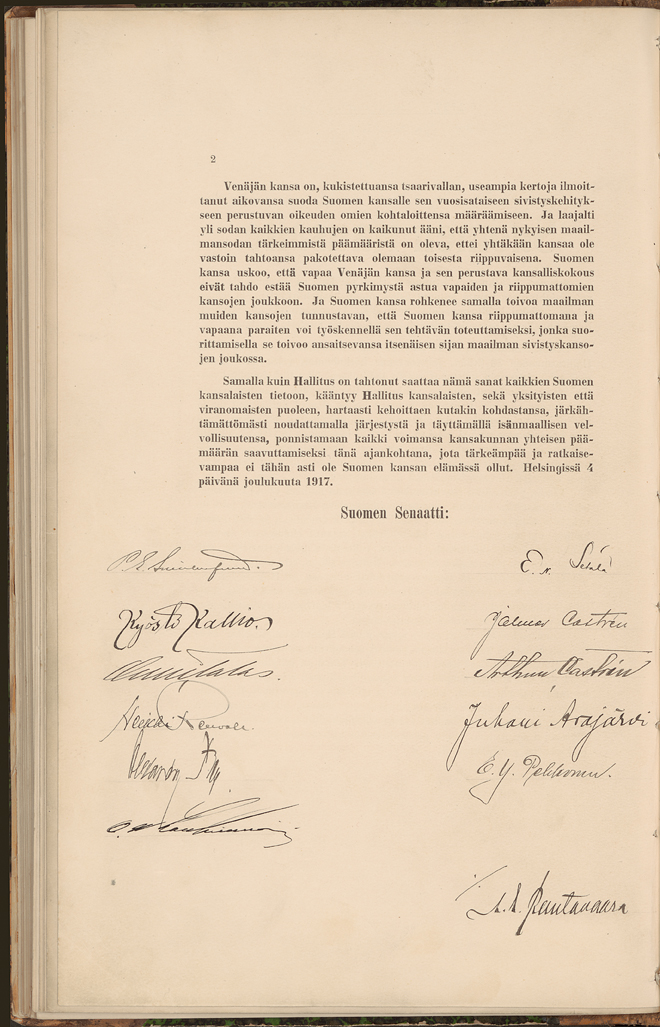
Image of the Declaration in Finnish with the senators' signatures
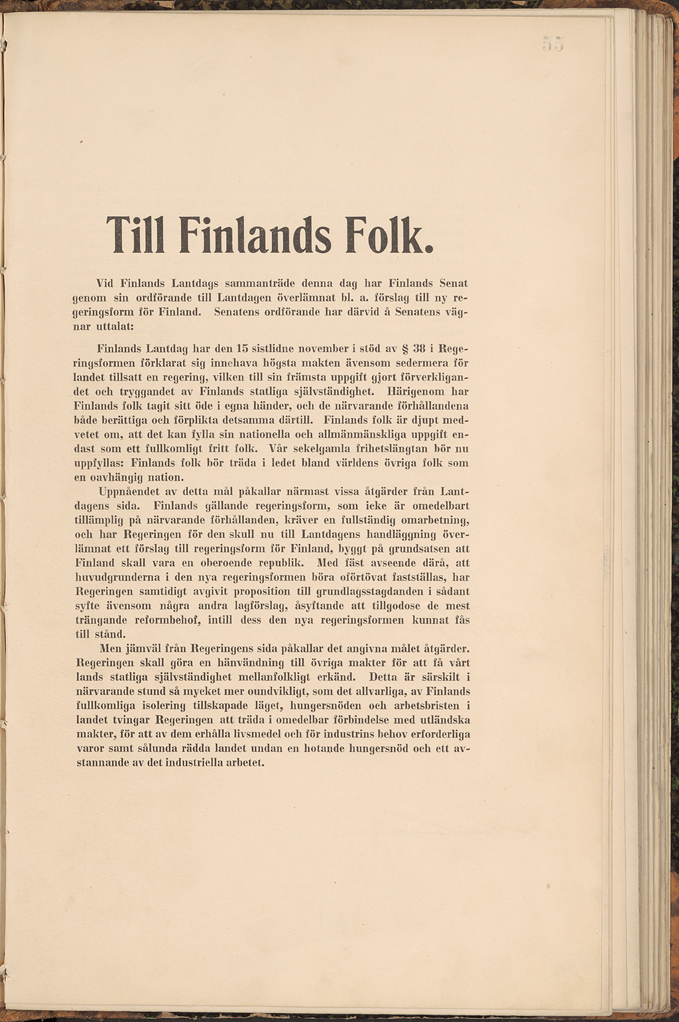
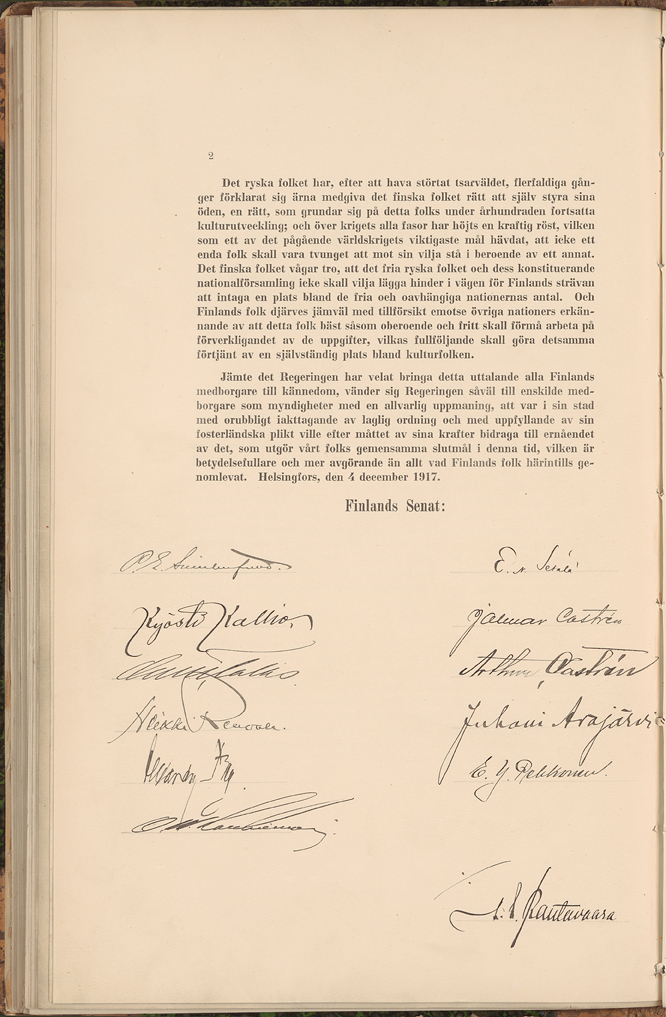
Image of the Declaration in Swedish with the senators' signatures

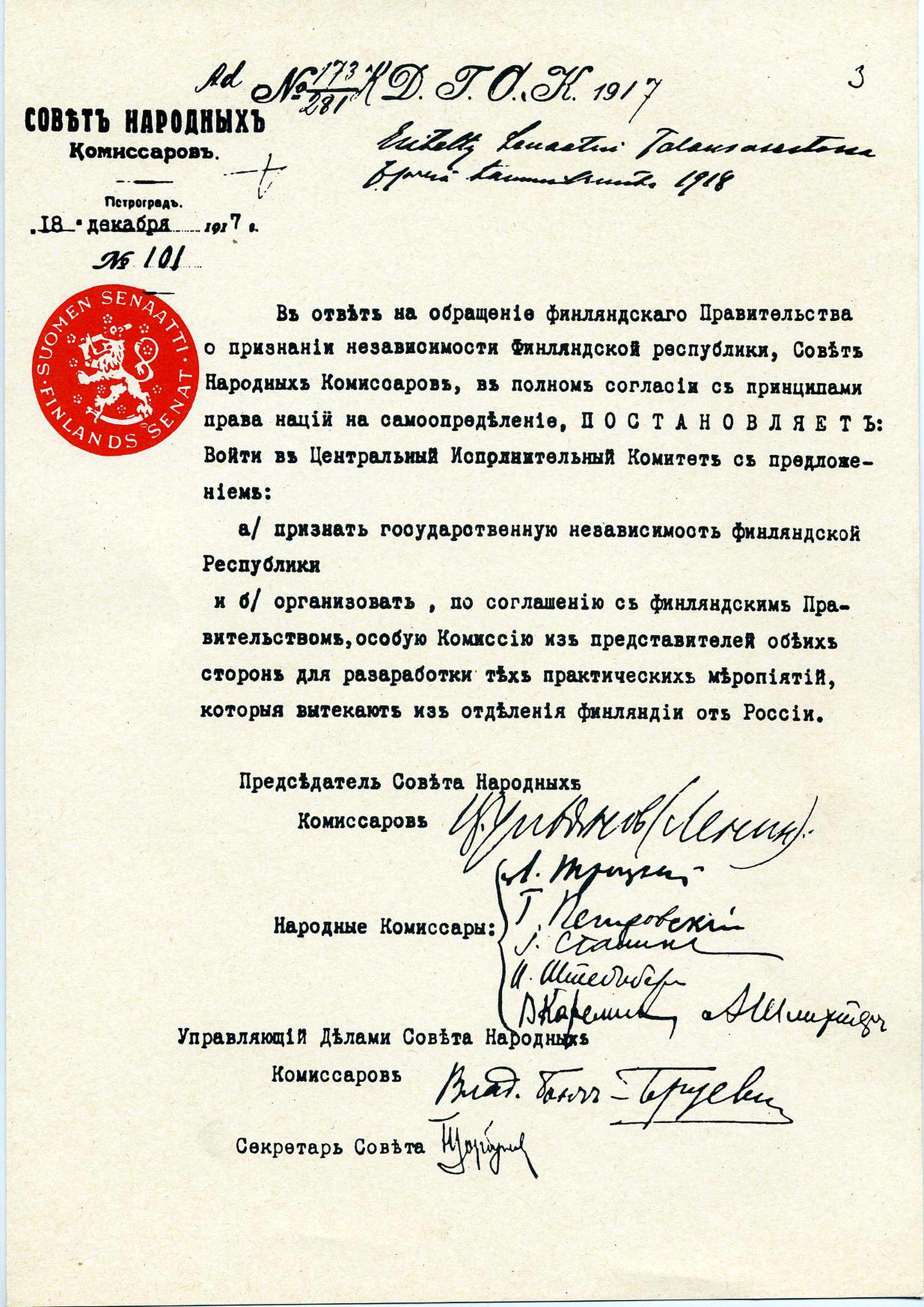
The Bolshevist government of RSFSR led by Lenin approve Finland's independence. It was the first foreign leader to approve the independence.

The Finnish Declaration of Independence (Finnish: Suomen itsenäisyysjulistus, Swedish: Finlands självständighetsförklaring) was adopted by the Parliament of Finland on 6 December 1917. It declared Finland to be independent from Russia, with reference to a bill simultaneously delivered to the Parliament to make Finland an independent republic instead.

Declaring independence was only part of the long process leading to the independence of Finland. The declaration is celebrated as Independence Day in Finland.

== History ==
=== Revolution in Russia ===
After the February Revolution and the abdication of Tsar Nicholas II, Grand Duke of Finland, on 2 March (15 March N.S.) 1917, the personal union between Russia and Finland lost its legal base – at least according to the view in Helsinki. There were negotiations between the Russian Provisional Government and Finnish authorities.

The resulting proposal, approved by the Provisional Government, was heavily rewritten in the Eduskunta (Finnish Parliament) and transformed into the so-called Power Act (Finnish: Valtalaki, Swedish: Maktlagen), whereby the Parliament declared itself to now hold all powers of legislation, except with respect to foreign policy and military issues, and also that it could be dissolved only by itself. At the time of the vote, it was believed that the Provisional Government would be quickly defeated by the rebellion in Saint Petersburg. The Provisional Government survived, however, disapproved of the Power Act and dissolved the Parliament.

After new elections and the ultimate defeat of the Provisional Government in the October Revolution, the Finnish Parliament decided to set a three-man regency council, based on Finland's Constitution, and more precisely on clause §38 of the old Instrument of Government of 1772, which had been enacted by the Estates after Gustav III's bloodless coup. This paragraph provided for the election of a new monarch in case of the extinction of the royal line and was interpreted in Finland as vesting sovereignty in the estates, later the Parliament, in such an interregnum. The regency council was never elected, because of the strong opposition of Finnish socialists and their general strike which demanded for more radical action.

On 2 November (15 November N.S.) 1917, the Bolsheviks declared a general right of self-determination, including the right of complete secession, "for the Peoples of Russia". On the same day the Finnish Parliament issued a declaration by which it assumed, pro tempore, all powers of the Sovereign in Finland.

The old Instrument of Government was however no longer deemed suitable. Leading circles had long held monarchism and hereditary nobility to be antiquated, and advocated a republican constitution for Finland.

=== Independence ===
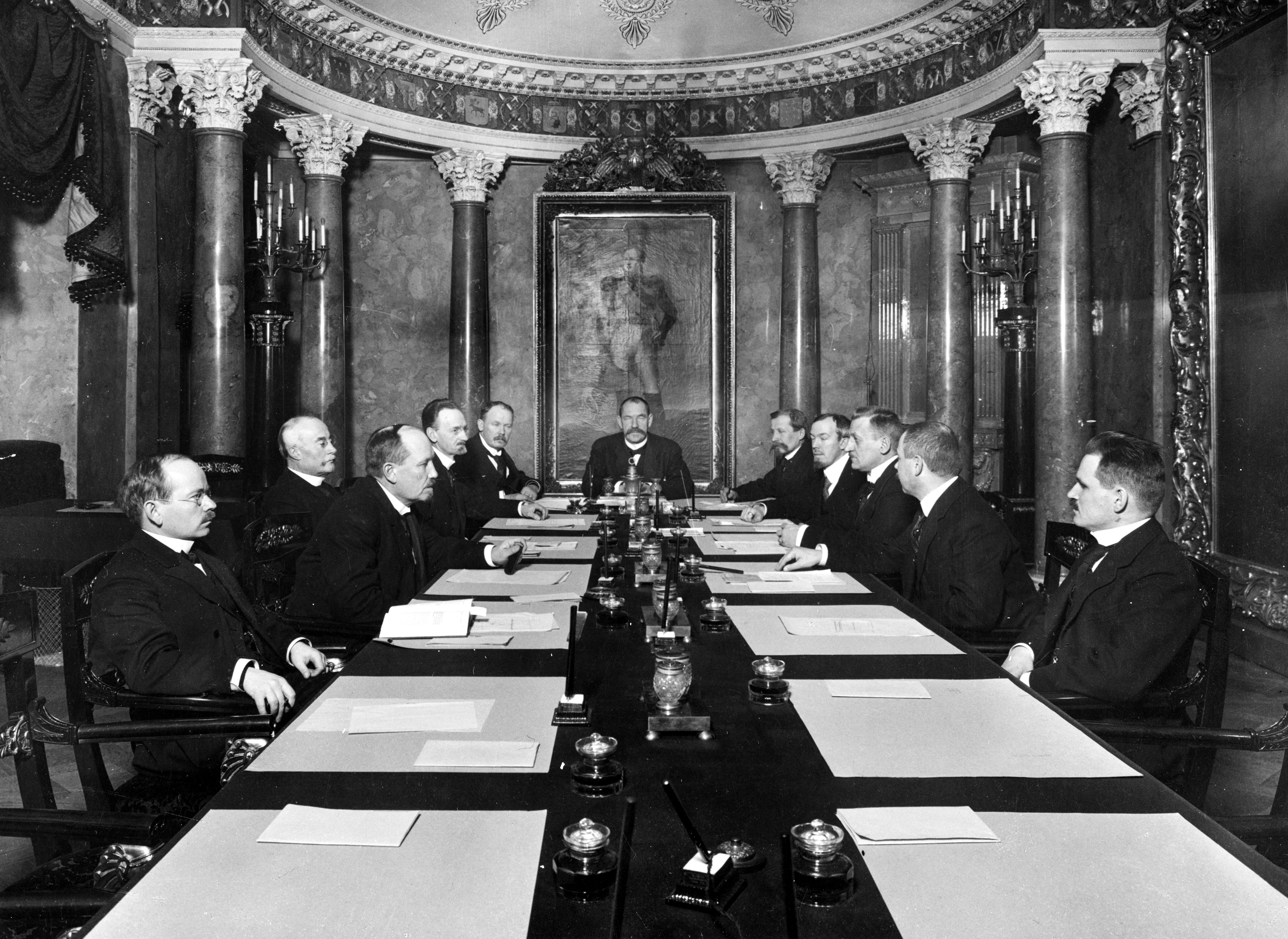
The Finnish Senate of 1917, Prime Minister P. E. Svinhufvud in the head of table. Photo taken on 27 November 1917; a portrait of Alexander I of Russia still hangs on the wall.

The Senate of Finland, the government that the Parliament had appointed in November, drafted a Declaration of Independence and a proposal for a new republican Instrument of Government. Chairman of the Senate (a.k.a. Prime minister) Pehr Evind Svinhufvud read the Declaration to the Parliament on 4 December. The Declaration of Independence was technically given the form of a preamble of the proposition, and was intended to be agreed by the Parliament, which adopted the Declaration on 6 December.

On 18 December (31 December N. S.) shortly after the head of Finnish government Svinhufvud declared his nation's full independence the Soviet Russian government became the first government outside of Finland to recognize Finnish independence. It issued a Decree recognising Finland's independence, and on 22 December (4 January 1918 N. S.) it was approved by the highest Soviet executive body, the All-Russian Central Executive Committee (VTsIK).

== The Declaration and 15 November ==
With reference to the declaration of 15 November, the declaration says:

The people of Finland have by this step taken their fate in their own hands; a step both justified and demanded by present conditions. The people of Finland feel deeply that they cannot fulfil their national and international duty without complete sovereignty. The century-old desire for freedom awaits fulfilment now; Finland's people step forward as a free nation among the other nations in the world. (...) The people of Finland dare to confidently await how other nations in the world recognize that with their full independence and freedom, the people of Finland can do their best in fulfilment of those purposes that will win them a place amongst civilized peoples.

=== Context ===
Estonia, Latvia, and Lithuania declared their independence from Russia during the same period. See Estonian War of Independence, Latvian Independence and Lithuanian Wars of Independence.

These three countries were occupied by, and annexed into, the Soviet Union (1940–1941, 1944–1991). See Occupation of the Baltic states.

=== Text of Finland's Declaration of Independence ===
To The Finnish People.

The Finnish Parliament has on 15th day of the last November, in support of Section 38 of the Constitution, declared to be the Supreme holder of the State Authority as well as set up a Government to the country, that has taken to its primary task the realization and safeguarding Finland's independence as a state. The people of Finland have by this step taken their fate in their own hands: a step both justified and demanded by present conditions. The people of Finland feel deeply that they cannot fulfil their national duty and their universal human obligations without a complete sovereignty. The century-old desire for freedom awaits fulfilment now; The People of Finland has to step forward as an independent nation among the other nations in the world.

Achieving this goal requires mainly some measures by the Parliament. Finland's current form of government, which is currently incompatible with the conditions, requires a complete renewal and therefore has the Government now submitted a proposition for a new Constitution to the Parliament's council, a proposition that is based on the principle that Finland is to be a sovereign republic. Considering that, the main features of the new polity has to be carried into effect immediately, the Government has at the same time delivered a bill of acts in this matter, which mean to satisfy the most urgent renewal needs before the establishment of the new Constitution.

The same goal also calls for measures from the part of the Government. The Government will approach foreign powers to seek an international recognition of our country's independence as a state. At the present moment this is particularly all the more necessary, when the grave situation caused by the country's complete isolation, famine and unemployment compels the Government to establish actual relations to the foreign powers, which prompt assistance in satisfying the necessities of life and in importing the essential goods for the industry, are our only rescue from the imminent famine and industrial stagnation.

The Russian people have, after subverting the Tsarist Regime, in a number of occasions expressed their intention to favour the Finnish people the right to determine their own fate, which is based on their centuries-old cultural development. And widely over all the horrors of the war is heard a voice, that one of the goals of the present war is to be, that no nation shall be forced against its will to be dependent on another (nation). The Finnish people believe that the free Russian people and its constitutive National Assembly don't want to prevent Finland's aspiration to enter the multitude of the free and independent nations. At the same time the People of Finland dare to hope that the other nations of the world recognizes, that with their full independence and freedom the People of Finland can do their best in fulfilment of those purposes that will win them an independent position amongst the people of the civilized world.

At the same time as the Government has wanted to let all the Finnish citizens to know these words, the Government turns to the citizens, as well as the private and public authorities, calling everyone on their own behalf with rapt attention to follow the (law and) order by filling their patriotic duty, to strain all their strength for achieving the nation's common goal in this point of time, which has such an importance and decisiveness, that there have never before been in the life of the Finnish people. In Helsinki, 4 December 1917.

The Finnish Senate:

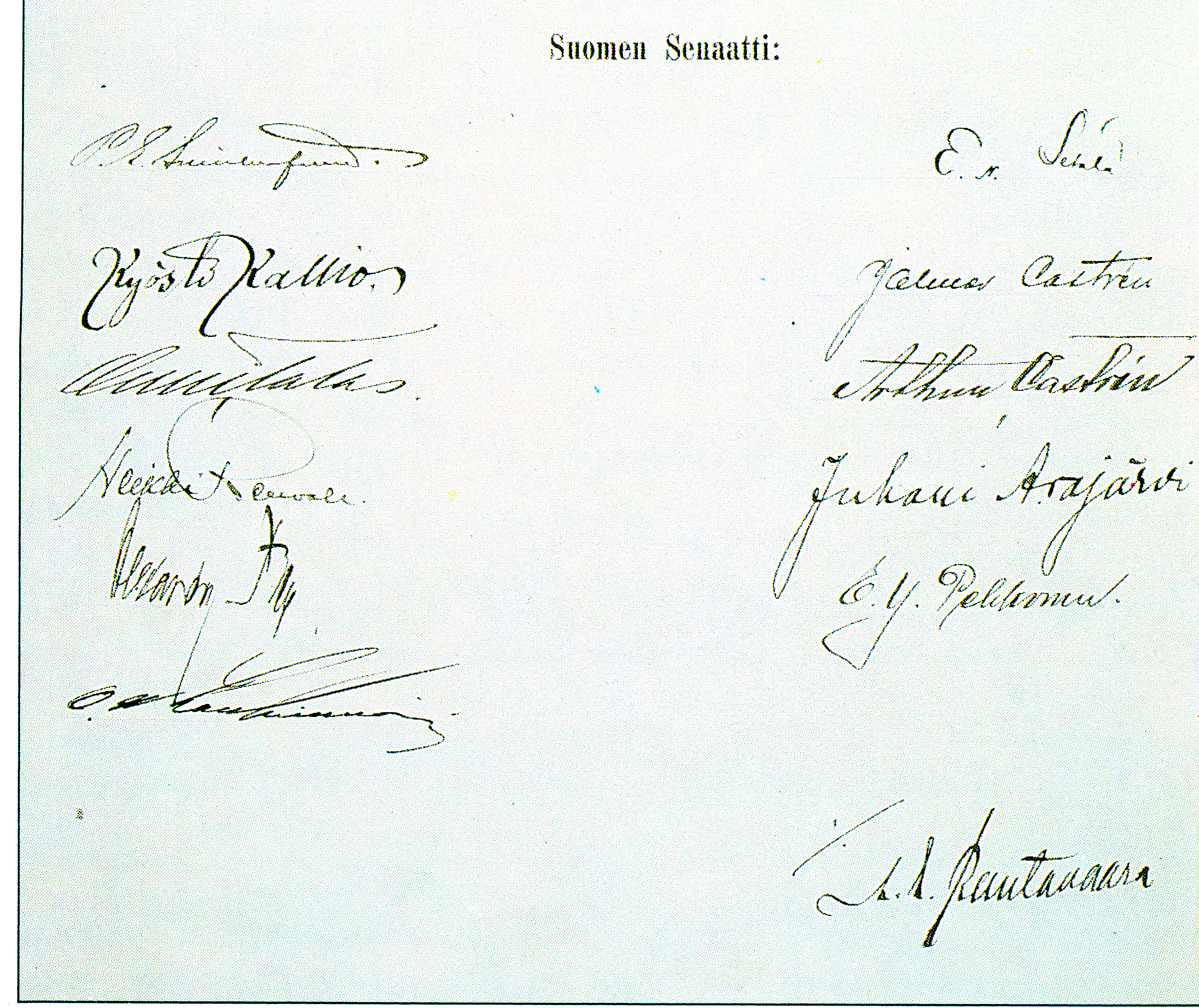
Signatures of the Finnish Senate

P. E. Svinhufvud.	E. N. Setälä.
Kyösti Kallio.	Jalmar Castrén.
Onni Talas.	Arthur Castrén.
Heikki Renvall.	Juhani Arajärvi.
Alexander Frey.	E. Y. Pehkonen.
O. W. Louhivuori.	A. E. Rautavaara (Senate Judge-Rapporteur)

== International recognition ==
State	Date
Russian Soviet Federative Socialist Republic	4 January 1918
France	4 January 1918
Sweden	4 January 1918
German Empire	4 January 1918
Kingdom of Greece	5 January 1918
Norway	10 January 1918
Denmark	10 January 1918
Switzerland	11 January 1918
Austria-Hungary	13 January 1918
Netherlands	28 January 1918
Spain	21 February 1918
Ottoman Empire	21 February 1918
Kingdom of Bulgaria	21 February 1918
Holy See	2 March 1918
Argentina	11 May 1918
Qajar Iran	23 July 1918
Siam	9 October 1919
Poland	8 March 1919
United Kingdom	6 May 1919
United States	7 May 1919
Empire of Japan	23 May 1919
Belgium	10 June 1919
Chile	17 June 1919
Peru	23 June 1919
Kingdom of Italy	27 June 1919
Uruguay	18 August 1919
Liechtenstein	27 October 1919
Portugal	19 December 1919
Brazil	26 December 1919
Colombia	31 December 1919
Kingdom of Romania	8 April 1920
United States of Venezuela	18 April 1920
Panama	17 May 1920
Ecuador	25 June 1920
Mexico	13 July 1920
Kingdom of Hungary	23 August 1920
Paraguay	3 June 1921
Luxembourg	25 October 1921
Kingdom of Yugoslavia	27 July 1922
Kingdom of Afghanistan	17 July 1928
Kingdom of Albania	1 December 1928

== See also ==
- History of Finland
- Independence of Finland
- Politics of Finland
- Russification of Finland
