= Pehr Evind Svinhufvud's first senate =

First legislature of independent Finland, in session from 1917 to 1918

Svinhufvud I Senate
- 1st Cabinet of Finland
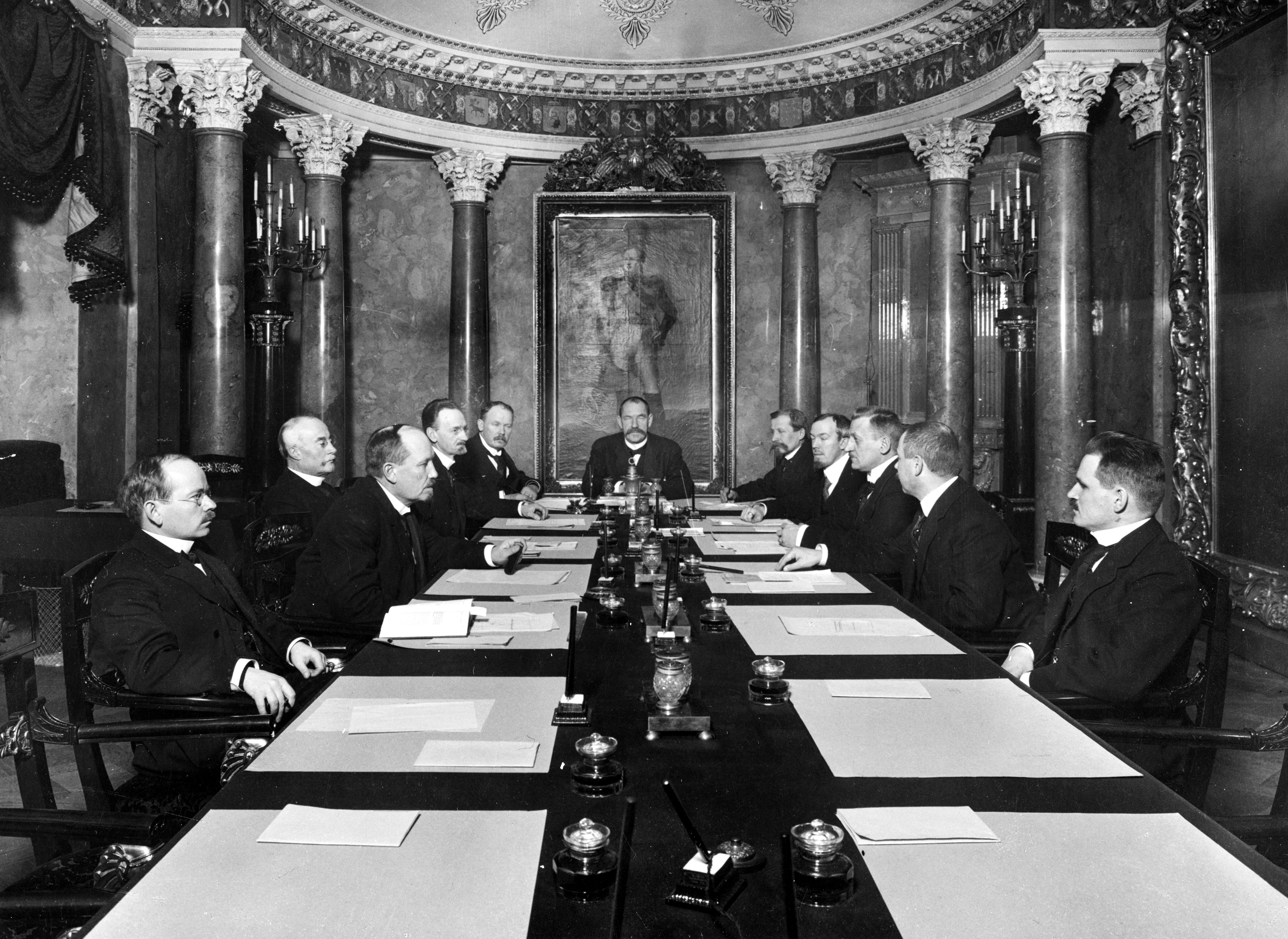
- Svinhufvud's first senate in 1917; Chairman P. E. Svinhufvud himself in the head of table.
- Date formed: 27 November 1917
- Date dissolved: 27 May 1918

People and organisations
- Prime Minister: Pehr Evind Svinhufvud
- Total no. of members: 11
- Member parties: Young Finnish Party; Finnish Party; Agrarian League; RKP; People's Party
- Status in legislature: Majority
- Opposition party: SDP

History
- Election: 1917
- Predecessor: Office established
- Successor: Paasikivi I

Pehr Evind Svinhufvud's first senate was the first Senate and de facto Government of independent Finland. Its term spanned November 27, 1917 – May 27, 1918.

It sat in Vaasa during the Finnish Civil War from January 29 to May 3, 1918 and was known as the Vaasa Senate during that time.

== Assembly ==
The following table displays the Senate's composition:

Portfolio	Minister	Took office	Left office	Party
Chairman of the Senate	Pehr Evind Svinhufvud	November 27, 1918	May 27, 1918	Young Finnish
Head of the Department for Justice	Onni Talas	November 27, 1918	May 27, 1918	Young Finnish
Head of the Department for Internal Affairs	Arthur Castrén	November 27, 1918	May 27, 1918	Young Finnish
Deputy Head of the Department for Internal Affairs	Alexander Frey	November 27, 1918	May 27, 1918	RKP
Head of the Financial Affairs Department	Juhani Arajärvi	November 27, 1918	May 27, 1918	Finnish
Head of the Department for Education and Ecclesiastical Affairs	Emil Nestor Setälä	November 27, 1918	May 27, 1918	Young Finnish
Head of the Department for Agriculture	Kyösti Kallio	November 27, 1918	May 27, 1918	Agrarian
Deputy Head of the Department for Agriculture	Eero Yrjö Pehkonen	November 27, 1918	May 27, 1918	Agrarian
Head of the Department for Transport and Public Works	Jalmar Castrén	November 27, 1918	May 27, 1918	Young Finnish
Head of the Department for Trade and Industry	Heikki Gabriel Renvall	November 27, 1918	May 27, 1918	Young Finnish
Head of the Department for Social Affairs	Oskari Wilho Louhivuori	November 27, 1918	May 27, 1918	Finnish

Preceded by Office established	Senate of Finland; November 27, 1917 – May 27, 1918	Succeeded by Paasikivi I
