= Antti Hackzell =

Prime Minister of Finland in 1944

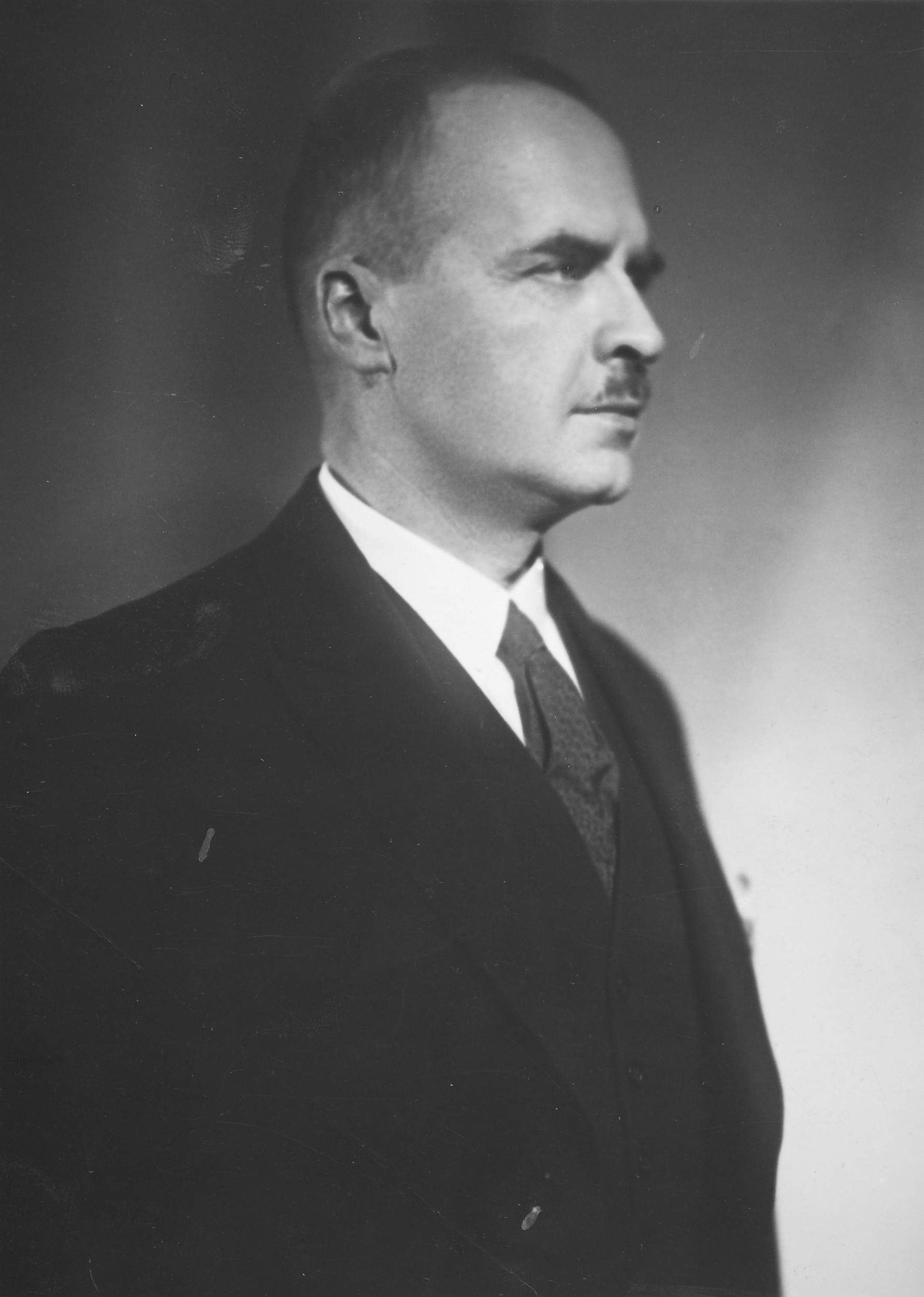

17th Prime Minister of Finland
- In office 8 August 1944 – 21 September 1944
- President: Carl G. E. Mannerheim
- Preceded by: Edwin Linkomies
- Succeeded by: Urho Castrén

Minister of Foreign Affairs
- In office 14 December 1932 – 7 October 1936
- Prime Minister: Toivo M. Kivimäki
- Preceded by: Aarno Yrjö-Koskinen
- Succeeded by: Rudolf Holsti

Personal details
- Born: Anders (Antti) Verner Hackzell; 20 September 1881 Mikkeli, Finland
- Died: 14 January 1946 (aged 64) Helsinki, Finland
- Party: National Coalition

Antti Verner Hackzell (20 September 1881 – 14 January 1946) was a Finnish politician from the National Coalition Party. He served as Prime Minister of Finland from August to September 1944 and as Finland's Minister for Foreign Affairs from 1932 to 1936.

== Early life and diplomatic career ==
Hackzell qualified for the bar in 1906 and subsequently held various positions in Saint Petersburg (renamed Petrograd in 1914) from 1911 until the Bolshevik seizure of power in 1917. After returning to Finland, he joined the White Guard during the Finnish Civil War and served as aide-de-camp to Aarne Sihvo, commander of the Karelian front.

Hackzell was the Governor of Viborg Province from 1918 to 1920. He then served as vice-chairman of the joint Finnish–Russian committee charged with implementing the Treaty of Tartu from 1920 to 1922.

Thereafter he became Finland's chargé d'affaires and, later the same year, envoy (minister) to the Soviet Union in Moscow, a post he held until 1927. During his years in Moscow he helped establish the legation's working methods under a dictatorship that made direct contact with Soviet society difficult.

In 1926, he advised the Finnish government during negotiations for a non-aggression pact with the Soviet Union, which broke down over the arbitration procedure Hackzell had championed. As early as 1925 he reported to President Lauri Relander that Joseph Stalin had become the most influential figure in the Soviet Union.

Hackzell's understanding of Soviet affairs was deepened by his brother-in-law, the Social Democratic politician Reinhold Svento, a Finnish Saint Petersburger married to Hackzell's sister Evi. The connection did not prevent friction with the Social Democrats.

After Väinö Voionmaa was appointed Minister for Foreign Affairs in 1926, Hackzell refused to draw his salary from the ministry, citing Voionmaa's role in drafting the Red Guard's operational plans during the 1918 civil war. The dispute contributed to Hackzell leaving his Moscow post in 1927. In 1930 he became deputy director of the Finnish Employers' Central Federation.

== Foreign minister and employers' federation ==
Hackzell served as Minister of Foreign Affairs in the cabinet of Toivo Kivimäki from 1932 to 1936. As foreign minister, he was one of the architects of Finland's pursuit of Nordic neutrality, which culminated in a declaration on Finland's Nordic orientation unanimously approved by parliament in 1935.

He subsequently became managing director of the Finnish Employers' Central Federation, a position he held from 1936. In that role he helped negotiate the so-called January Engagement of 1940 — an agreement that opened the way for direct negotiations between the employers' federation and the Central Organisation of Finnish Trade Unions — and commissioned comprehensive wage statistics.

== Prime minister and the Moscow peace delegation ==
In early August 1944, after Carl G. E. Mannerheim had succeeded Risto Ryti as president, Hackzell was asked to form a government tasked with negotiating peace with the Soviet Union; he accepted after being pressed by, among others, Edwin Linkomies and Mannerheim. He subsequently led the Finnish peace delegation to Moscow. The only other willing candidate to lead the delegation was cabinet minister J. K. Paasikivi, whom Hackzell considered unsuitable owing to Paasikivi's conciliatory stance toward the Soviet Union. The delegation was forced to wait a week in Moscow while the Allies finalised the armistice agreement with Romania.

On 14 September 1944, while at the Savoy Hotel ahead of negotiations with the Soviet delegation led by Foreign Minister Vyacheslav Molotov, Hackzell suffered a stroke and took no further part in the talks. His own foreign minister, Carl Enckell, was sent from Helsinki to conclude the negotiations in his place. As a result, Hackzell was forced to resign as prime minister. The composition of the government remained essentially unchanged under his successor, fellow party member Urho Castrén. He never fully recovered from the stroke and died in Helsinki just over a year later.

== Personal life ==
Hackzell was the son of headmaster Mathias Gustaf Hackzell and Helena Nathalia ("Lilli") Örn. In 1914 he married Elsa Julia Wolff.

== Family origins ==
The Hackzell family name derives from the Hacksta family estate, located in Hacksta, Uppland in Sweden. Through Mårten Hackzell, the only child of the Uppland clergyman Andreas Hackzelius, and through Mårten's offspring, the Hackzell family spread to Norrland and Finland.

== Cabinets ==
- Hackzell Cabinet

Political offices
Preceded by Edwin Linkomies	Prime Minister of Finland; 1944	Succeeded by Urho Castrén
Preceded by Aarno Yrjö-Koskinen	Foreign Minister of Finland; 1932–1936	Succeeded by Rudolf Holsti
