= Ingman I cabinet =

Government of Finland (1918-1919)

Ingman I Cabinet
- 3rd Cabinet of Finland
- Date formed: 27 November 1918
- Date dissolved: 17 April 1919

People and organisations
- Prime Minister: Lauri Ingman
- Total no. of members: 13
- Member parties: National Coalition; RKP; National Progressive

History
- Predecessor: Paasikivi I
- Successor: Kaarlo Castrén

Lauri Ingman's first cabinet was the third Government of independent Finland and the first to be officially designated as Government (valtioneuvosto) instead of Senate (senaatti). The cabinet's time period lasted from November 27, 1918 to April 17, 1919, following the surrender of Germany and the consequent republican transformation of the Finnish form of state.

== Assembly ==
The following table displays the Government's composition:

Portfolio	Minister	Took office	Left office	Party
Prime Minister	Lauri Ingman	November 27, 1918	April 17, 1919	National Coalition
Minister for Foreign Affairs	Carl Enckell	November 27, 1918	April 17, 1919	Independent
Deputy Minister for Foreign Affairs	Leo Ehrnrooth	November 27, 1918	April 17, 1919	RKP
Minister of Justice	Karl Söderholm	November 27, 1918	April 17, 1919	RKP
Minister of War	Rudolf Walden	November 27, 1918	April 17, 1919	Independent
Minister of the Interior	Antti Tulenheimo	November 27, 1918	April 17, 1919	National Coalition
Minister of Finance	Kaarlo Castrén	November 27, 1918	April 17, 1919	National Progressive
Deputy Minister of Finance	Juho Vennola	November 27, 1918	April 17, 1919	National Progressive
Minister of Education and Ecclesiastical Affairs	Mikael Soininen	November 27, 1918	April 17, 1919	Young Finnish
Minister of Agriculture	Uuno Brander	November 27, 1918	April 17, 1919	Agrarian
Minister of Transport and Public Works	Bernhard Wuolle	November 27, 1918	April 17, 1919	National Coalition
Minister of Trade and Industry	Julius Stjernvall	November 27, 1918	April 17, 1919	RKP
Minister of Social Affairs	Eero Erkko	November 27, 1918	April 17, 1919	National Progressive
Minister of Food	Mikko Collan	November 27, 1918	April 17, 1919	National Progressive

Preceded by Paasikivi I	Government of Finland; November 27, 1918 – April 17, 1919	Succeeded by Kaarlo Castrén
