= Carl Voss-Schrader =

Finnish military officer, politician and lawyer (1880–1955)

Carl Voss-Schrader (9 October 1880–7 February 1955) was a Finnish colonel, business director and lawyer who briefly served as the minister of interior between 17 April and 15 August 1919.

== Biography ==
Voss-Schrader was born in Helsinki on 9 October 1880. He was a colonel and lawyer by profession. His father was Albert Voss-Schrader, a businessman in the dairy industry.

He served as the minister of interior between 17 April and 15 August 1919 in the cabinet led by Kaarlo Castrén. Voss-Schrader was the military member of the Supreme Court in the period between 1924 and 1928. Then he became the head of the civil administration in northern Finland during the Finnish-Russian War.

He died in Stockholm, Sweden, on 7 February 1955.
