= Otto Stenroth =

Finnish lawyer, politician and banker (1861–1939)

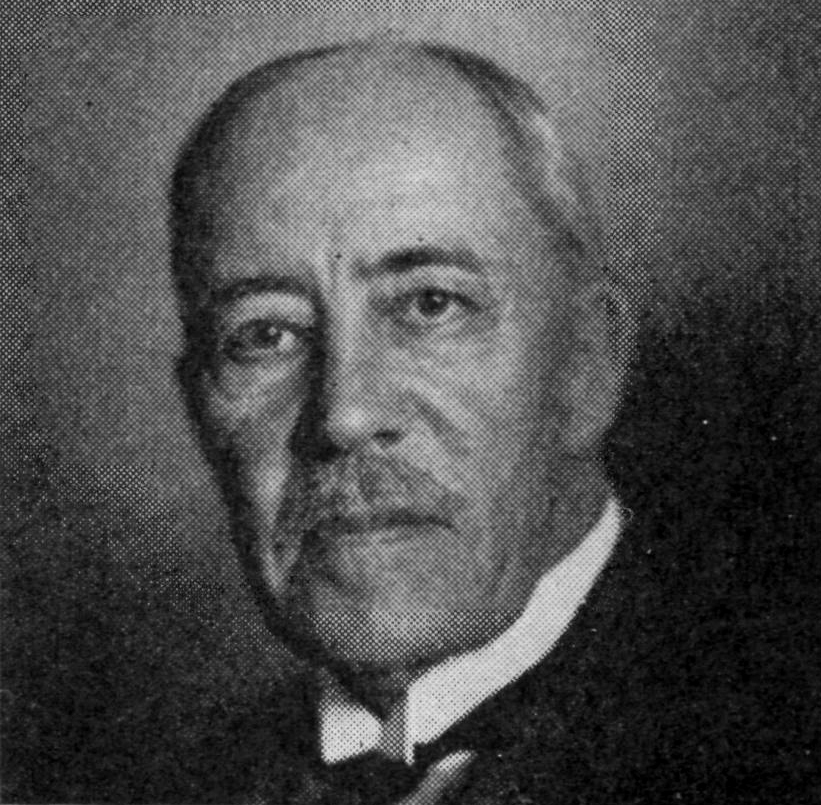
Otto Stenroth

Otto Stenroth (13 May 1861 in Saarijärvi – 16 December 1939 in Helsinki) was a Finnish lawyer, politician and banker.

He served as a member of Kansallis-Osake-Pankki bank executive board from 1889 to 1893, and deputy director general of Kansallis-Osake-Pankki bank executive board from 1893 to 1906. Thereafter, he was chairman of the board of Hypoteekkikassa from 1904 to 1908 and 1909 to 1916. Stenroth was the managing director of Finnish Real Estate Bank from 1907 to 1908 and 1909 to 1918.

Stenroth was a member of the Diet of Finland for the burghers 1891–1900. He was elected as a member of the parliament for the Young Finnish Party from the Eastern Province of Vaasa constituency for 1908–1909. He was a member of the Helsinki City Council in 1911-1918 and its vice chairman from 1915 to 1918.

Stenroth was in the Senate of the Grand Duchy of Finland, and head of the Senate Commerce and Industry Committee in the Hjelt cabinet in 1908–1909. When Finland gained independence, Stenroth became the Head of the Foreign Affairs Board and a senator in the Paasikivi cabinet from 27 May 1918 to 27 November 1918.

Stenroth was the Governor of Bank of Finland from 13 December 1918 to 20 January 1923.

Political offices
Preceded by New position	Head of the Foreign Affairs Board; 1918	Succeeded by Carl Enckell
Government offices
Preceded by Clas Herman von Collan	Governor of the Bank of Finland; 1918-1923	Succeeded by August Ramsay
