= August Ramsay =

Finnish mathematician, banker and insurance executive

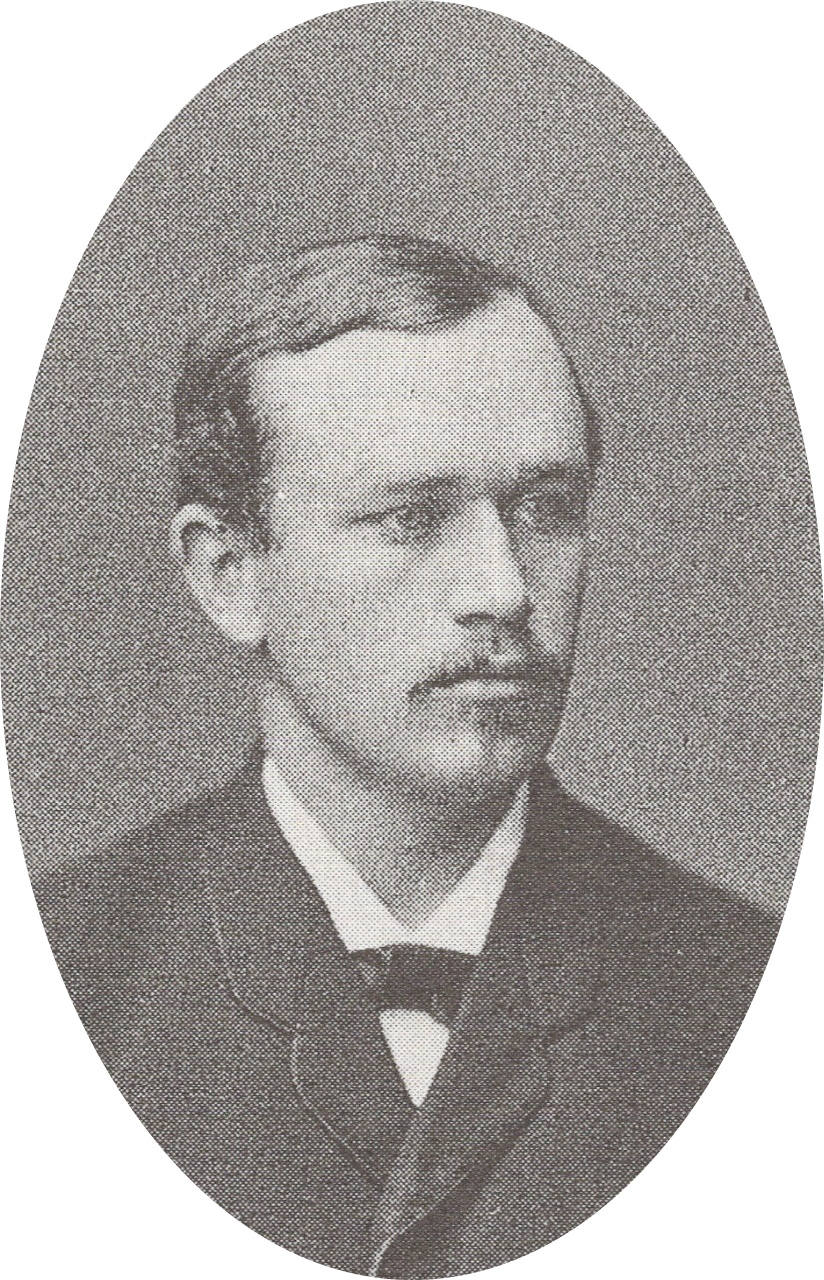
- Ramsay in 1884

Minister of Finance
- In office 17 April 1919 – 15 August 1919
- Preceded by: Kaarlo Castrén
- Succeeded by: Johannes Lundson

Personal details
- Born: 15 March 1859 Dalsbruk, Dragsfjärd
- Died: 23 July 1943 (aged 84) Espoo
- Party: Swedish People's Party

August Ramsay (15 March 1859 – 23 July 1943) was a Finnish mathematician, banker and insurance executive.

Ramsay was promoted to doctor of philosophy from Imperial Alexander University in 1882. From 1891 Ramsay served as Finland's first insurance reviewer until 1895, when he became CEO of the Finnish Urban Mortgage Fund. From 1897 to 1899, Ramsay served as a member of the Finance Committee and the State Railways Committee. From May to August 1901, Ramsay was a member of the Senate of Finland. From November 1902, Ramsay served as the first managing director of the Mutual Fire Aid Association of Finnish Industrialists until 1913. From 1916 to 1939, Ramsay was a member of the board of directors of the same company and from 1940 to 1943 the chairman of the company's board of directors.

Ramsay represented his noble family of Scottish origin in the Diet of Finland from 1885 to 1906.

Ramsay served as Minister of Finance for 121 days Kaarlo Castrén's Minority Government in 1919, representing the Swedish People's Party. From 1923 to 1924, Ramsay served as the governor of the Bank of Finland and as the chairman of the executive board. Ramsay served as Member of Parliament for the Uusimaa constituency from 1 April 1919 to 4 September 1922.

== Personal life ==
Ramsay's mother Emmy Tham was from Falun, Sweden. He was married to the historian Jully Ramsay. Their son was Henrik Ramsay. August's brothers were Wilhelm Ramsay and Wolter Ramsay.

== See also ==
- Suomen Yhdyspankki

Government offices
Preceded by Otto Stenroth	Governor of the Bank of Finland; 1923-1924	Succeeded by Risto Ryti
Preceded by Kaarlo Castrén	Minister of Finance of Finland; 1919	Succeeded by Johannes Lundson
