= Mikko Collan =

Finnish military colonel and politician of the National Progressive Party

Colonel Mikko (Karl Johan Michael) Collan (22 July 1881 – 3 October 1964) was a Finnish military officer, farmer, and politician, born in Nurmes. He was a member of the National Progressive Party. He served as Minister of Provisions in Lauri Ingman's first cabinet (27 November 1918 – 17 April 1919); in Kaarlo Castrén's cabinet (17 April 1919 – 15 September 1919); and in Juho Vennola's first cabinet (15 September 1919 – 15 March 1920). He was also a Member of Parliament (1 April 1920 – 8 October 1920).
