= Kaarlo Castrén cabinet =

Government of Finland (1919)

Kaarlo Castrén Cabinet
- 4th Cabinet of Finland
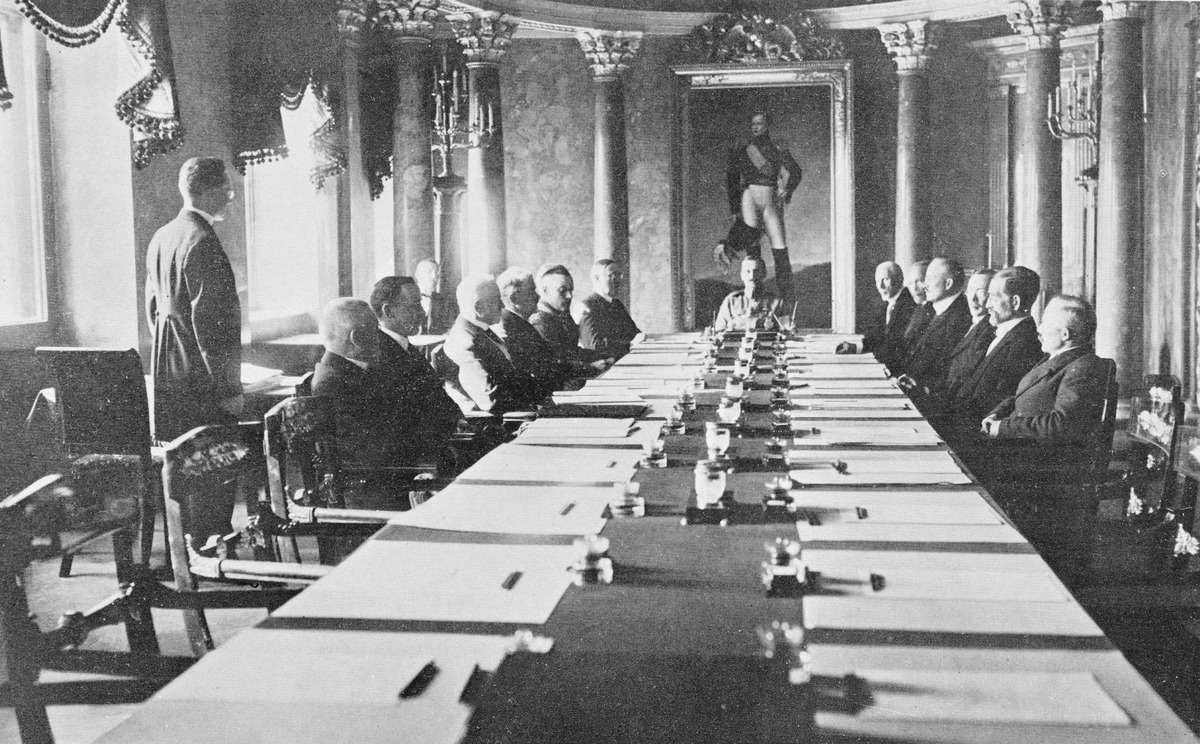
- Government of Kaarlo Castrén in Finland, summer 1919
- Date formed: 17 April 1919
- Date dissolved: 15 August 1919

People and organisations
- Prime Minister: Kaarlo Castrén
- Total no. of members: 14
- Member parties: National Progressive; Agrarian League; RKP
- Status in legislature: Minority government

History
- Predecessor: Ingman I
- Successor: Vennola I

Kaarlo Castrén's cabinet was the fourth Government of the Republic of Finland. The cabinet's period was from April 17, 1919 to August 15, 1919. It was a minority government.

== Assembly ==
Cabinet members
Portfolio	Minister	Took office	Left office	Party
Prime Minister	Kaarlo Castrén	April 17, 1919	September 15, 1919	National Progressive
Minister for Foreign Affairs	Carl Enckell	November 27, 1918	April 17, 1919	Public servant
Minister for Foreign Affairs	Rudolf Holsti	April 28, 1919	September 15, 1919	National Progressive
Minister of Justice	Karl Söderholm	April 17, 1919	September 15, 1919	RKP
Minister of War	Rudolf Walden	April 17, 1919	September 15, 1919	Public servant
Minister of the Interior	Carl Voss-Schrader	April 17, 1919	September 15, 1919	Public servant
Minister of Finance	August Ramsay	April 17, 1919	September 15, 1919	RKP
Minister of Education and Ecclesiastical Affairs	Mikael Soininen	April 17, 1919	September 15, 1919	National Progressive
Minister of Agriculture	Kyösti Kallio	April 17, 1919	September 15, 1919	Agrarian
Minister of Transport and Public Works	Eero Erkko	April 17, 1919	September 15, 1919	National Progressive
Minister of Trade and Industry	Juho Vennola	April 17, 1919	September 15, 1919	National Progressive
Minister of Social Affairs	Santeri Alkio	April 17, 1919	September 15, 1919	Agrarian
Minister of Food	Mikko Collan	April 17, 1919	September 15, 1919	National Progressive
Minister without portfolio	Mikko Luopajärvi	April 17, 1919	September 15, 1919	Agrarian

Preceded by Ingman I	Government of Finland; April 17, 1919 – September 15, 1919	Succeeded by Vennola I
