= Savoy Hotel, Moscow =

Historical hotel built in 1913

Hotel Savoy Moscow
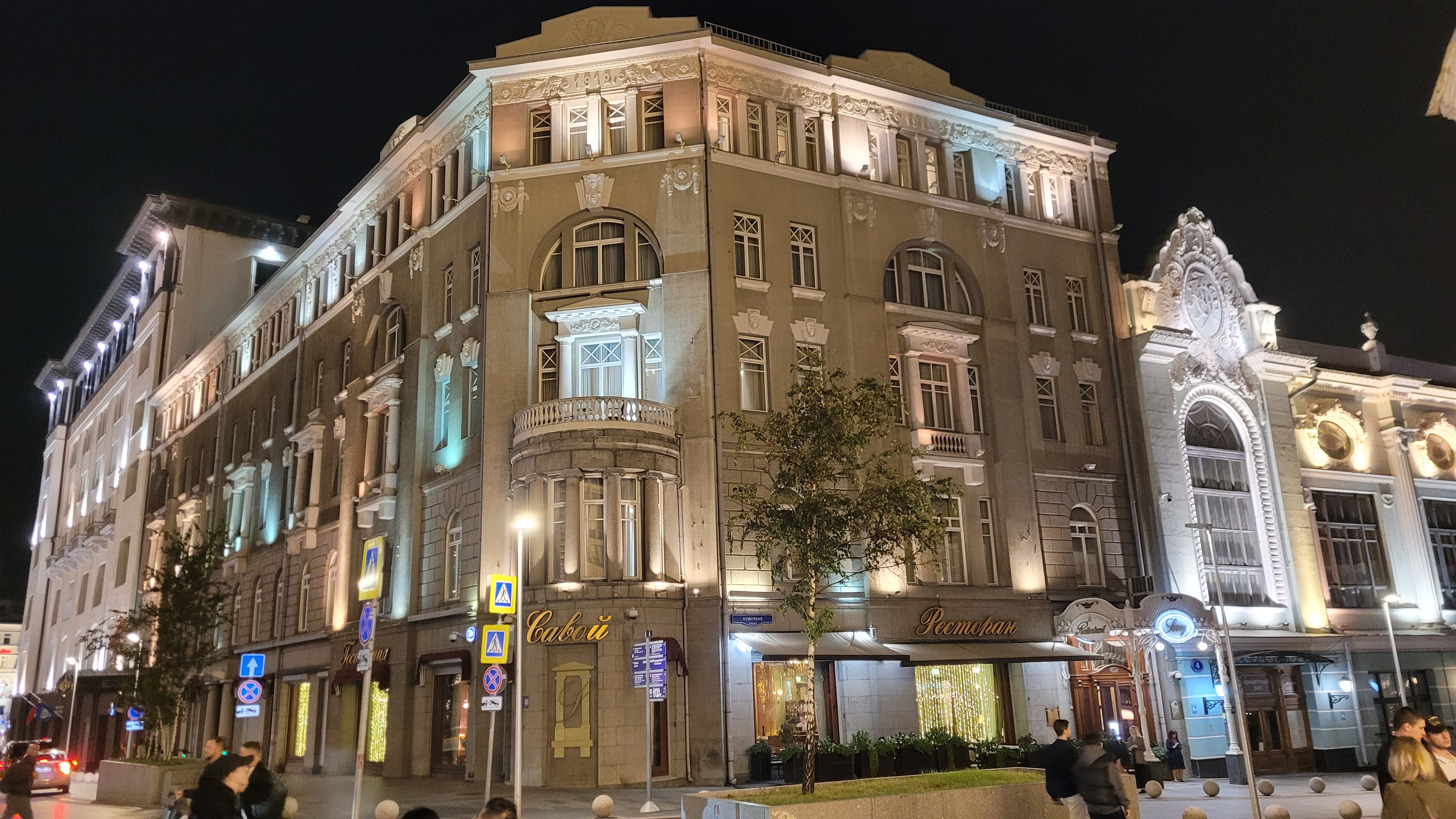
- Hotel Savoy, 2023
- Interactive map of the Hotel Savoy Moscow area

General information
- Location: 3/6, b.1, Rozhdestvenka Str., Moscow, 109012, Russian Federation

The Hotel Savoy Moscow is a historic hotel in Moscow, opened in 1913. The symbol of the hotel is a salamander.

== Location ==
55°45′38″N 37°37′23″E, at 3/6, b.1, Rozhdestvenka, Moscow, 109012, Russia.

== History ==
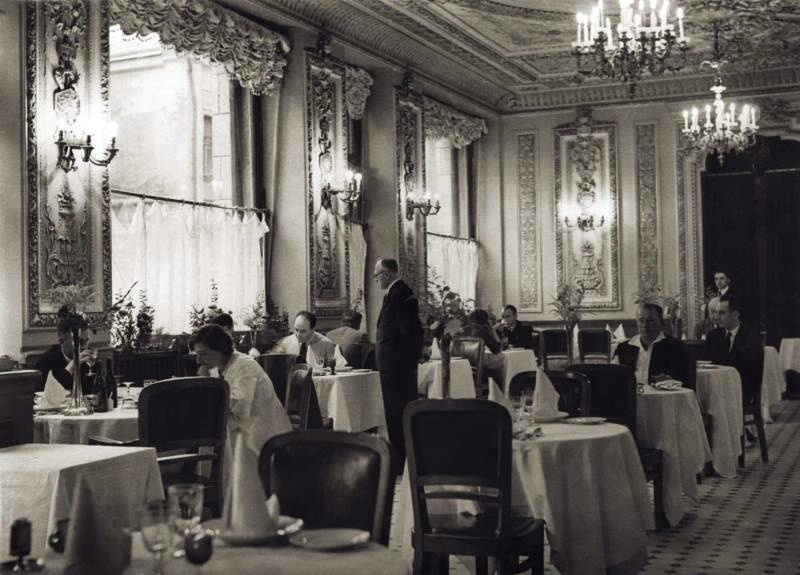
Hotel Savoy dining room, 1930s.

The Savoy Hotel opened on March 30, 1913. It was built to host tourists visiting Russia for the Romanov tercentenary, a huge celebration of 300 years of Russian imperial rule in May 1913. In 1914, a cinema hall was opened at the Savoy. In 1917, during the change of power, the Savoy was closed, but 10 years later it was reopened and it became one of the four best hotels in Moscow.

In 1959, in honor of the 10th anniversary of the German Democratic Republic, the hotel was renamed Hotel Berlin.

In 1987, the hotel closed for a $16 million restoration, funded by INFA, a joint venture between Intourist, the Soviet state tourism monopoly, and Finnair, which reserved 80% of the rooms for its own passengers. It reopened on October 3, 1989, under its original name, as the Hotel Savoy Moscow. The hotel was aimed exclusively at wealthy Western guests. Like most other luxury hotels in Moscow at the time, it did not accept Rubles, but unlike others, it did not accept western hard currency cash either. Instead, the Savoy required that all payments be made with credit cards, to cut down on corruption. Among its amenities was a casino, operated by another Finnish firm, Casino Amherst International Ltd. In 2005, the Savoy was renovated, at a cost of $20 million.

== Current ownership ==
The hotel is owned by OAO Infa-Otel, whose stock is shared between Musgrave Holdings (84%), a member of the Guta Group, and the government of Moscow (16%).
