= Matthias Castrén =

Finnish ethnologist, educator and philologist (1813-1852)

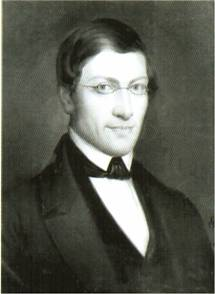
- Born: Matthias Alexander Castrén; 2 December 1813; Tervola, Grand Duchy of Finland, Russian Empire
- Died: 7 May 1852 (aged 38); Helsinki, Grand Duchy of Finland, Russian Empire
- Education: Imperial Alexander University
- Known for: researcher of Uralic languages
- Scientific career
- Workplaces: Professor at Imperial Alexander University

Matthias Alexander Castrén (2 December 1813 – 7 May 1852) was a Finnish ethnologist and philologist who was a pioneer in the study of the Uralic languages. He was an educator, author and linguist at the Imperial Alexander University in Helsinki. Castrén is known for his research in the linguistics and ethnography of the Northern Eurasian peoples.

== Early life ==
Castrén was born at Tervola, in northern Finland. His father, Christian Castrén, the parish priest and vicar in Rovaniemi, died in 1825. Castrén passed under the protection of his uncle, Matthias Castrén. At the age of twelve, he was sent to school at Oulu. On entering the Alexander University in Helsinki (now the University of Helsinki) in 1828, he first devoted himself to Greek and Hebrew with the intention of entering the church, but his interest was soon excited by the Finnish language, and even before his course was completed, he began to lay the foundations of a work on Finnish mythology. He received his bachelor's degree in 1836 and graduate degree in 1839.

== Linguistic adventures ==
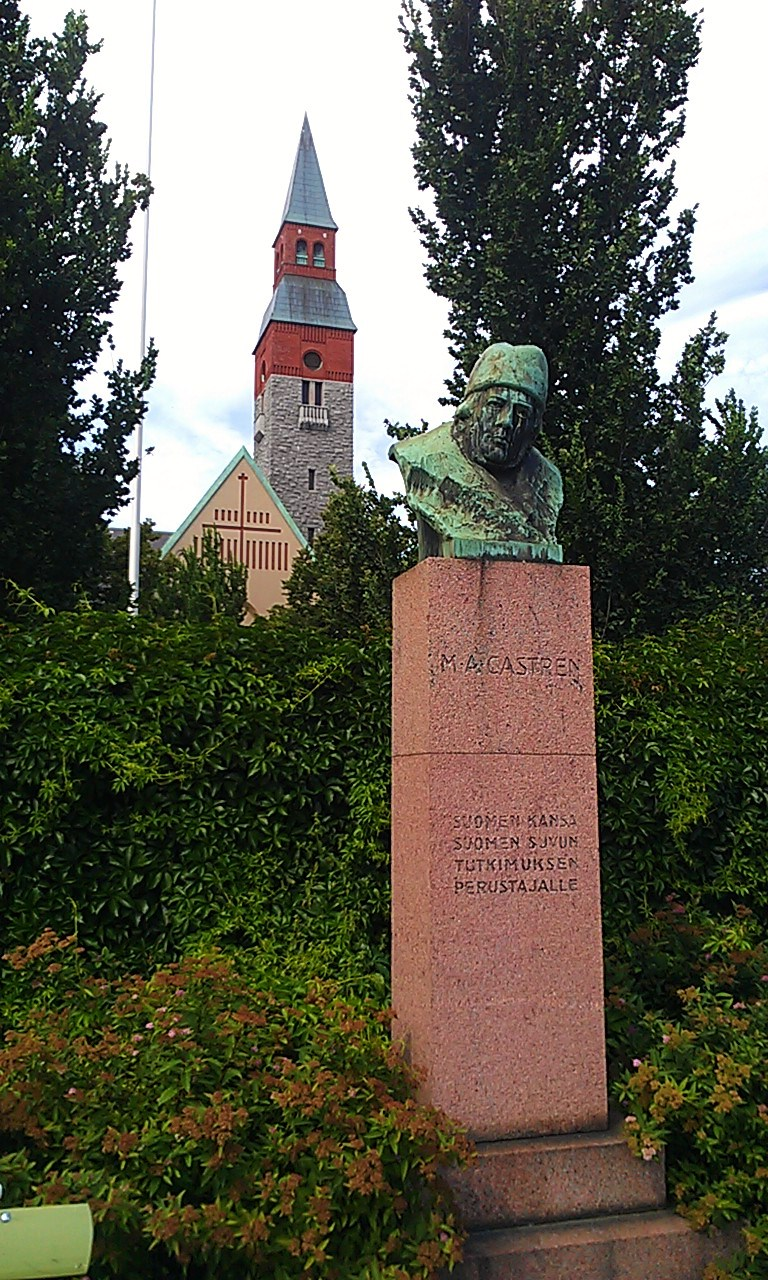
Bust of Castrén in Töölö, with National Museum of Finland in the background

The necessity of personal explorations among the still-unwritten languages of cognate tribes soon made itself evident. In 1838. he joined a medical fellow student, Dr. Ehrström, in a journey through Lapland. That was the first of the voyages Castrén undertook to investigate the kinship between Finnish and several other languages. He was later appointed in 1840 to associate professor in Finnish and the Norse languages at the University of Helsinki. The next year, he traveled in Karelia at the expense of the Literary Society of Finland.

In 1841, he undertook with the Finnish philologist Elias Lönnrot a third journey, which ultimately extended beyond the Urals as far as Obdorsk and lasted three years. Before starting on the expedition, he had published a translation into Swedish of the Finnish epic of Kalevala. Upon his return, he gave to the world his Elementa grammatices Syrjaenæ, 'Elements of Komi-Zyryan grammar' (1844) and Elementa grammatices Tscheremissæ, 'Elements of Mari (Cheremiss) grammar' (1845).

No sooner had he recovered from the illness, which his last journey had occasioned, than he set out, under the auspices of the Academy of St Petersburg and the Alexander University, on an exploration among the indigenous peoples of Siberia, which resulted in a vast addition to previous knowledge but seriously affected the health of the adventurous investigator. The first fruits of his collections were published in St. Petersburg in 1849 in the form of Versuch einer ostjakischen Sprachlehre, 'Essay on Khanty (Ostyak) grammar' (1858). In 1850, he published the treatise De affixis personalibus linguarum Altaicarum, 'On the personal affixes of Ural-Altaic languages' and was appointed professor of the new chair of Finnish language and literature at the University of Helsinki. The following year saw him raised to the rank of chancellor of the university. He was busily engaged in what he regarded as his principal work, a grammar of the Samoyedic languages, when he died in 1852, at 38 years of age.

== Personal life ==
In 1850, he married Lovisa Natalia Tengström (1830–1881), whose father, Johan Jakob Tengström (1787–1858), was a professor of theoretical and practical philosophy at Alexander University. They were the parents of the newspaper publisher and elected official Robert Castrén (1851–1883).

== Posthumous publications ==
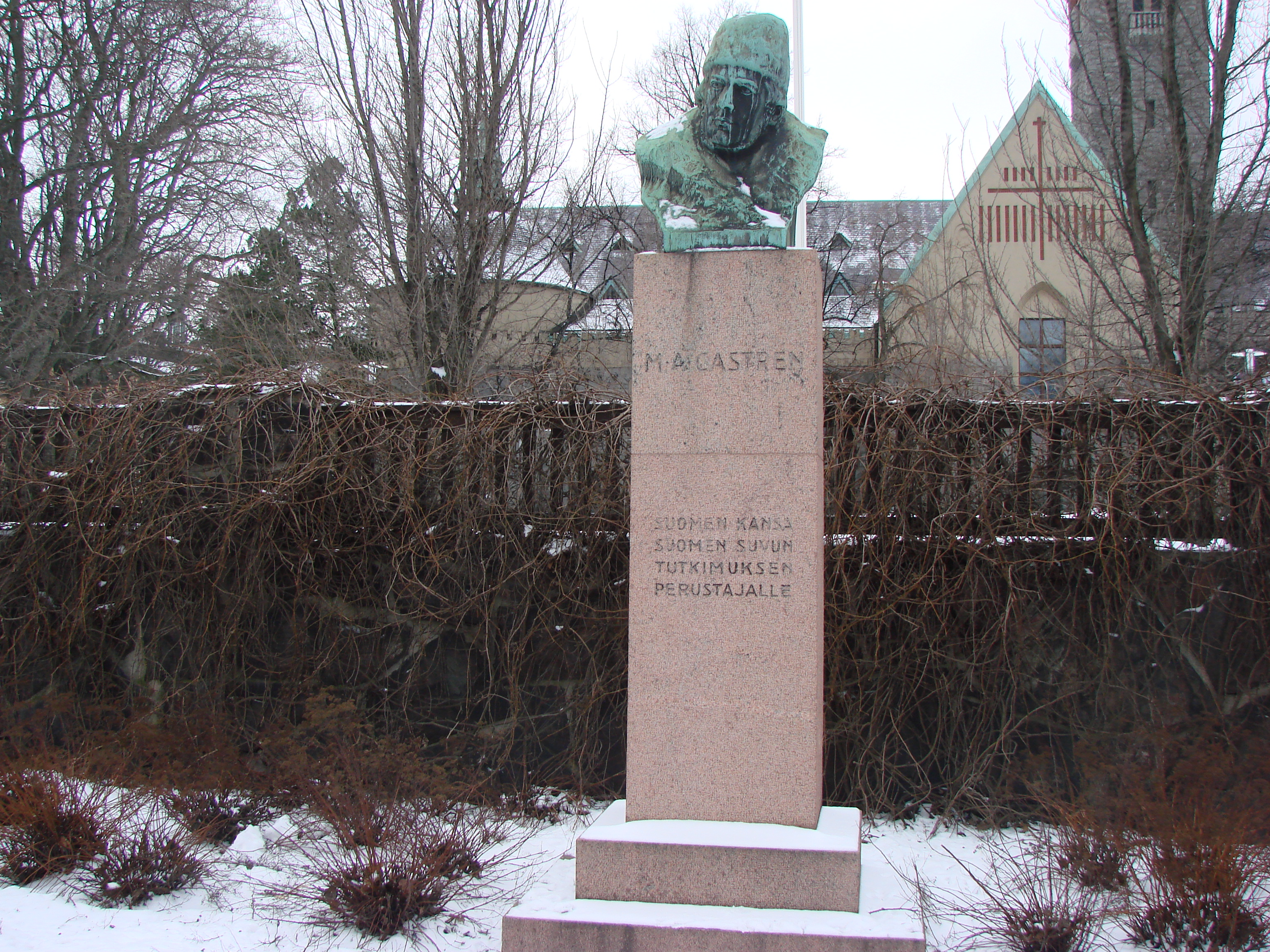
A bust of Matthias Castrén in Kamppi.

Five volumes of his collected works appeared from 1852 to 1858, containing respectively (1) Reseminnen från åren 1838-1844; (2) Reseberättelser och bref åren 1845-1849; (3) Föreläsningar i finsk mytologi; (4) Ethnologiska föreläsningar öfver altaiska folken; and (5) Smärre afhandlingar och akademiska dissertationer. A German translation was published by Anton Schiefner, who was also entrusted by the St. Petersburg Academy with the editing of his manuscripts, which had been left to the University of Helsinki and were subsequently published.

== M. A. Castrén Society ==
The M. A. Castrén Society was founded in Helsinki on 22 January 1990. It creates contacts and fosters dialogue between Finns and other Uralic peoples and provides assistance for the publication of literature in the Uralic languages.

== Primary Source ==
- Matthias Castrén in 375 humanists 01.03.2015, Faculty of Arts, University of Helsinki
