= Inga-Brita Castrén =

Finnish theologian

- Born: Inga-Brita Ulrika Elisabet Castrén; 26 March 1919; Helsinki Finland
- Died: 31 December 2003 (aged 84); Helsinki, Finland
- Occupation: theologian
- Years active: 1940-1984

Inga-Brita Castrén (1919–2003) was a Finnish theologian who spent ten years abroad working in Geneva for the World Student Christian Federation, the World YWCA, and the World Council of Churches as an ecumenical adviser. Returning to Finland, she worked in adult education and served as the General Secretary of the Finnish Ecumenical Council. After retirement, Castrén continued writing for a decade.

== Biography ==
Inga-Brita Ulrika Elisabet Castrén was born 26 March 1919 in Helsinki, Finland. She was the daughter of Supreme Administrative Court of Finland President and one-time interim Prime Minister Urho Castrén.

Castrén earned a master's degree in theology and philosophy and entered the foreign service, in the 1940s, serving as Secretary of Foreign Affairs, overseeing women's work and the Finnish Christian Student Association.

She worked in Geneva between 1958 and 1962 as the World Student Christian Federation's Secretary to Africa. Between 1962 and 1969 she served as the World YWCA Consultant on Christian Education and Ecumenical Affairs. Then in 1969 she joined the World Council of Churches as executive secretary for mission education. After four years, she left Geneva, returning to Finland in 1973.

Arriving back in Finland, Castrén supervised adult educational learning activities and from 1974-1984 served as the General Secretary of the Finnish Ecumenical Council (SEN). Even after her retirement, Castrén attended conferences and remained abreast of changes in the professional field. In 2000, Castrén was awarded an honorary PhD in Theology from the University of Helsinki.

Castrén died in Helsinki on 31 December 2003.

== Selected works ==
- Uudet silmät (with Hans-Ruedi Weber) Helsinki: Suomen lähetysseura, (1959) (in Finnish)
- Madagascar and Basutoland travel diary Geneva]: [s.n.], (1962) (in English)
- Jeesus Kristus vapauttaa ja yhdistää: kirkkojen maailmanneuvoston 5. yleiskokous; Nairobi, Kenia 23.11.-10.12.1975; valmisteluaineistoa (with Leena Brummer; et al.) Helsinki: Suomen ekumeeninen neuvosto, (1974) (in Finnish)
- Avoimuuteen sidottu: Näköaloja ja kokemuksia kansainvälisessä ekumeenisessa työssä Pieksämäki: Kirjaneliö, (1990) (in Finnish)
- Anna meidät toisillemme: Hartauksia yhteisellä tiellä Lapua: Herättäjä-Yhdistys, (1994) (in Finnish)
