= Treaty of Tartu =

Treaty of Tartu may refer to:

- Treaty of Tartu (Estonia–Russia)
- Treaty of Tartu (Finland–Russia)

== See also ==
- Treaty of Dorpat, a Russo-Swedish treaty of 1564
