= Urho Castrén =

Prime minister of Finland in 1944

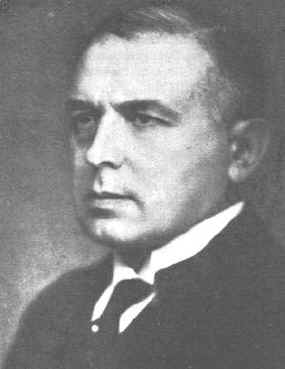

18th Prime Minister of Finland
- In office 21 September 1944 – 17 November 1944
- President: C. G. E. Mannerheim
- Preceded by: Antti Hackzell
- Succeeded by: Juho K. Paasikivi

Minister of Justice
- In office 31 December 1925 – 13 December 1926
- Prime Minister: Kyösti Kallio
- Preceded by: Oskar Lilius
- Succeeded by: Väinö Hakkila

Personal details
- Born: Urho Jonas Castrén; 30 December 1886 Jyväskylä, Grand Duchy of Finland, Russian Empire
- Died: 8 March 1965 (aged 78) Helsinki, Finland
- Party: National Coalition

Urho Jonas Castrén (30 December 1886, in Jyväskylä – 8 March 1965, in Helsinki) was a judge, serving for 27 years as the President of the Supreme Administrative Court of Finland. During the constitutional crisis of 1944, Castrén, representing the National Coalition Party, became Prime Minister of Finland briefly.

== Biography ==
Urho Jonas Castrén was born 30 December 1886, in Jyväskylä to Johannes Castrén and Amanda Ulrika Jussilainen. He attended the Lyceum of Jyväskylä, completing his classics studies in 1904 and earning a legal degree in 1907. He took his Master of Laws in 1910 and obtained a degree in rights in 1912. Between 1918 and 1927 he taught at the Agriculture and Forestry division and Political Science Department of the Faculty of Law at the University of Helsinki as a specialty teacher.

He joined the law firm of Jonas Castrén and worked as an assistant from 1913 to 1914. In 1914, he became a legal counselor and a member of the Helsinki City Court, where he remained until 1917 when he transferred to the Residential Tax Assessor's office. He served on the assessor's Board of Directors between 1917 and 1922. Castrén entered the judiciary in 1922 first serving as Saarijärven judicial district judge until 1926, then as Deputy Chancellor of Justice between 1926 and 1928; Chancellor of Justice from 1928 to 1929; and finally as President of the Supreme Administrative Court from 1929 to 1956.

He was also Minister of Justice from December 1925 to December 1926.

Castrén formed a coalition government after Antti Hackzell became incapacitated. The main task of his government was enforcing the Moscow Armistice.

Castrén was the father of theologian Inga-Brita Castrén.

== Cabinets ==
- Urho Castrén Cabinet

Political offices
Preceded by Antti Hackzell	Prime Minister of Finland; 1944	Succeeded by Juho Kusti Paasikivi
