= Klaus Castrén =

Finnish diplomat

Klaus Alarik Castrén

Ambassador of Finland to Mexico City
- In office 1970–1972

Head of the Department of Foreign Affairs
- In office 1972–1976

Ambassador of Finland to Buenos Aires
- In office 1976–1983

Ambassador of Finland to Ankara
- In office 1983–1986

Personal details
- Born: 13 April 1923 Suomenlinna, Finland
- Died: 17 January 2011 (aged 87) Helsinki, Finland
- Education: Master of Political Science
- Occupation: Diplomat

Klaus Alarik Castrén (13 April 1923, Suomenlinna – 17 January 2011, Helsinki) was a Finnish diplomat, a Master of Political Science by education. He was the Finnish Ambassador to Mexico City from 1970 to 1972, Head of the Department of Foreign Affairs from 1972 to 1976, Ambassador to Buenos Aires from 1976 to 1983 and to Ankara from 1983 to 1986.

During his tenure in Argentina Castrén forbade and attempted to hinder any assistance to the victims of the military junta after the 1976 coup d'état, which in part led to the disappearance and death of at least one Finnish citizen, Hanna Hietala, and her family.
