= Natalia Castrén =

Finnish culture personality and salon hostess

Natalia Castrén (née Tengström; December 24, 1830 Helsinki – November 22, 1881 Helsinki) was a Finnish culture personality and salon hostess. She belonged to Johan Ludvig Runeberg's social circle and was an important member of the contemporary cultural circles in Finland.

In 1850, Matthias Alexander Castrén and Natalia married; they were the parents of newspaper publisher and elected official Robert Castrén (1851–1883).

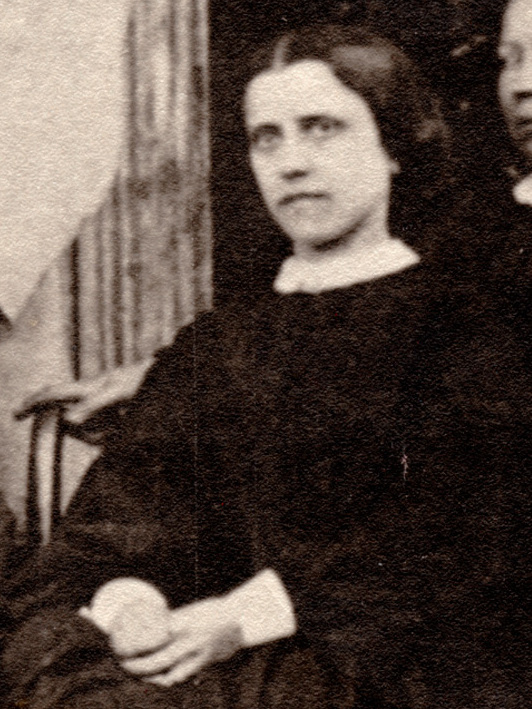
Natalia Castrén, was a Finnish culture personality and salon hostess.
