= Garth Castrén =

Finnish diplomat (born 1939)

Garth Christopher Castrén (born 1939) is a Finnish diplomat, a master of political science education. He has been Finnish Ambassador to Lusaka, 1984–1987, Ministry for Foreign Affairs, 1987, deputy director of the Development Cooperation Department 1988–1989, Consul General in New York City–1992 and Ambassador to Cairo 1992–1997 and in Ankara from 2000 to 2004.
