= Arthur Castrén =

Finnish politician

Johan Arthur Castrén
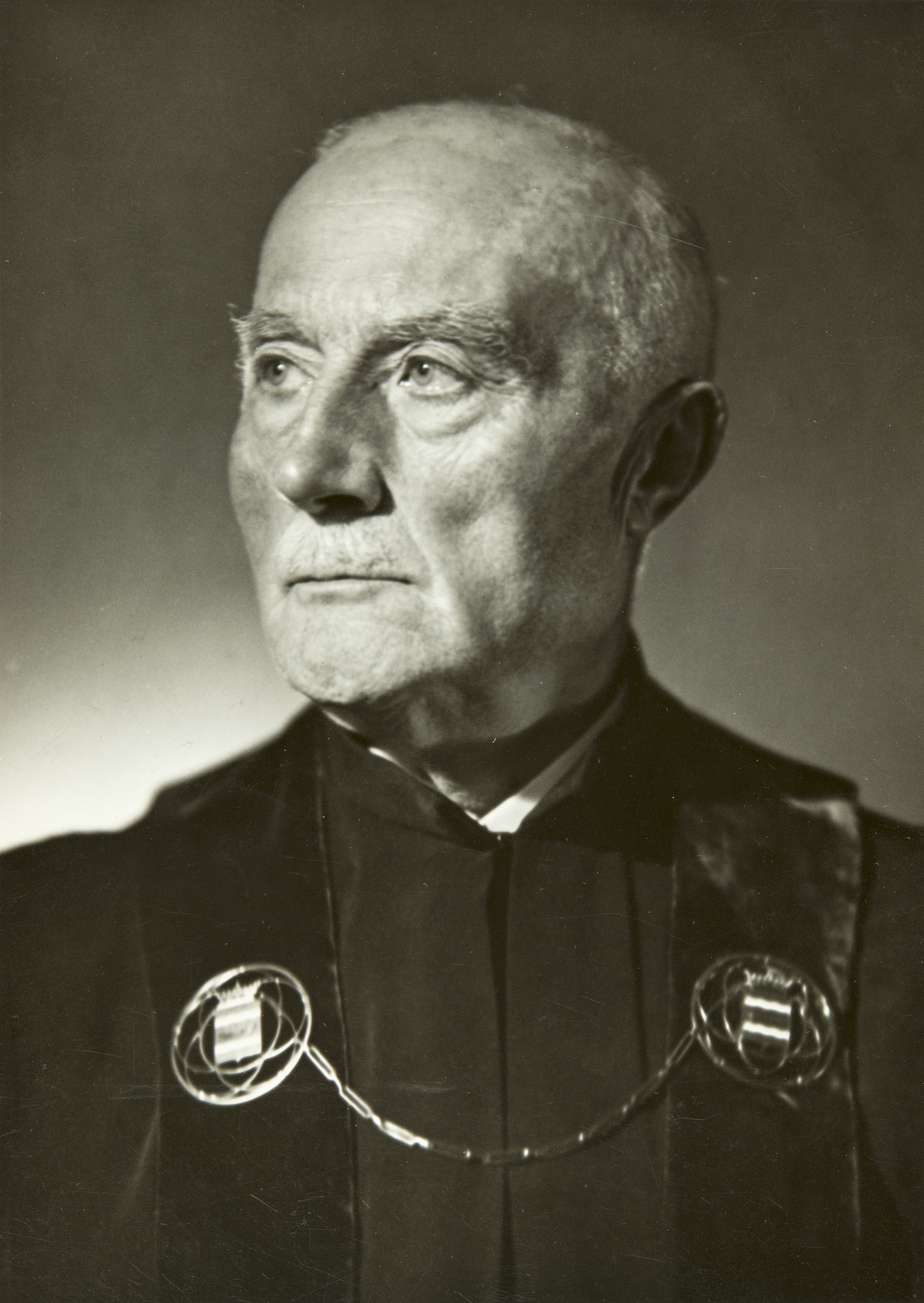
- Castrén in the 1930s
- Constituency: Southern electoral district of Oulu

Personal details
- Born: June 10, 1866 Turtola, Grand Duchy of Finland
- Died: June 29, 1946 (aged 80) Pietarsaari, Finland
- Citizenship: Finland
- Political party: Young Finnish Party

Johan Arthur Castrén (10 June 1866 – 29 June 1946) was a Finnish politician, born in Turtola. He was a member of the Senate of Finland and the first director of internal affairs from 27 November 1917 to 27 November 1918, before the Ministry of Interior was created. He served as the municipal mayor of Oulu from 1896–1908 and as the mayor of Helsinki from 1922–1930, and formally as the senior municipal mayor from 1931–1936.

== Life and political career ==
Arthur Castrén belonged to the Castrén family, a historically notable and influential family of civil servants and priests. Castrén was born to Johan Robert Castrén and Ida Taucher on 10 June 1866; he had an older brother called Kaarlo Castrén, who was also influential in politics.

Castrén completed the matriculation examination in 1884 and subsequently the general law degree in 1888, earning the title of vice judge in 1891. Castrén would serve as the mayor of Oulu from 1896–1908 and would represent the bourgeoise estate at the diets of 1904-1905 and 1905-1906. Castrén was elected as the legal mayor of Oulu in 1908, a position he held until his resignation in November 1918. During his time in Oulu, he also served as a member of the city council from 1904–1905 and 1908–1917.

Castrén was first elected as a member of parliament in 1909 and served there until his resignation in 1913 in light of a health condition. In November 1917, he was appointed head of the Department of Internal Affairs under Svinhufvud's senate. Early on, Arthur Castrén sought to provide the government with strict enforcement powers to suppress internal unrest.

During the Finnish Civil War in 1918, Castrén had to go into hiding in Red-controlled Helsinki. After the German forces captured the capital city, he briefly led, in April–May, a makeshift "Castrén Senate" consisting of four individuals in hiding, until the other senators who had fled to Vaasa returned. During this time, he issued orders regarding the treatment of Red prisoners, which he apparently later deemed too lenient.

Castrén would serve as the mayor of Helsinki from 1922 to 1930 and formally as the senior municipal mayor from 1931 to 1936. In these roles, he took a strict stance against what he saw as disorderly socialist demonstrations, even dispatching the fire brigade to disperse the Red Day demonstrations on August 1, 1929.
