= Kaarlo Castrén =

Prime minister of Finland in 1919

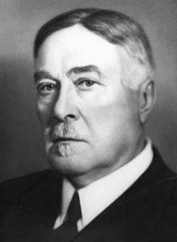

4th Prime Minister of Finland
- In office 17 April 1919 – 15 August 1919
- President: Kaarlo Juho Ståhlberg
- Preceded by: Lauri Ingman
- Succeeded by: Juho Vennola

Minister of Finance
- In office 27 November 1918 – 17 April 1919
- Prime Minister: Lauri Ingman
- Preceded by: Juhani Arajärvi
- Succeeded by: August Ramsay

Personal details
- Born: 28 February 1860 Turtola, Grand Duchy of Finland, Russian Empire
- Died: 19 November 1938 (aged 78) Helsinki, Finland
- Party: National Progressive

Kaarlo Castrén (28 February 1860 – 19 November 1938) was a Finnish politician and Prime Minister of Finland. He represented the National Progressive Party.

== Biography ==
Castrén was born in Turtola and graduated in 1887 as a Bachelor of Law. From 1888 to 1892, he worked in the finance division of the Senate of Finland, and from 1888 to 1898 in the Castrén & Snellman attorneys-at-law office.

From 1892 to 1904, Castrén was a member of the board in the Kansallis-Osake-Pankki bank. He attended the state board meetings in 1894 and from 1905 to 1906. He was Senator from 1908 to 1909, after which he founded an attorney-at-law office. In 1916, Castrén was elected as the director of Kansallis-Osake-Pankki.

In November 1918, Castrén was named Minister of Finance. He served as Prime Minister of Finland from 17 April to 15 August 1919. His government gave a proposal of the republic form of government in Finland, and after the proposal was accepted, the government disbanded.

Castrén died in Helsinki.

== Cabinets ==
- Kaarlo Castrén Cabinet

Political offices
Preceded by Lauri Ingman	Prime Minister of Finland; 1919	Succeeded by Juho Vennola
