= Heikki Renvall =

Finnish lawyer, journalist and politician (1872–1955)

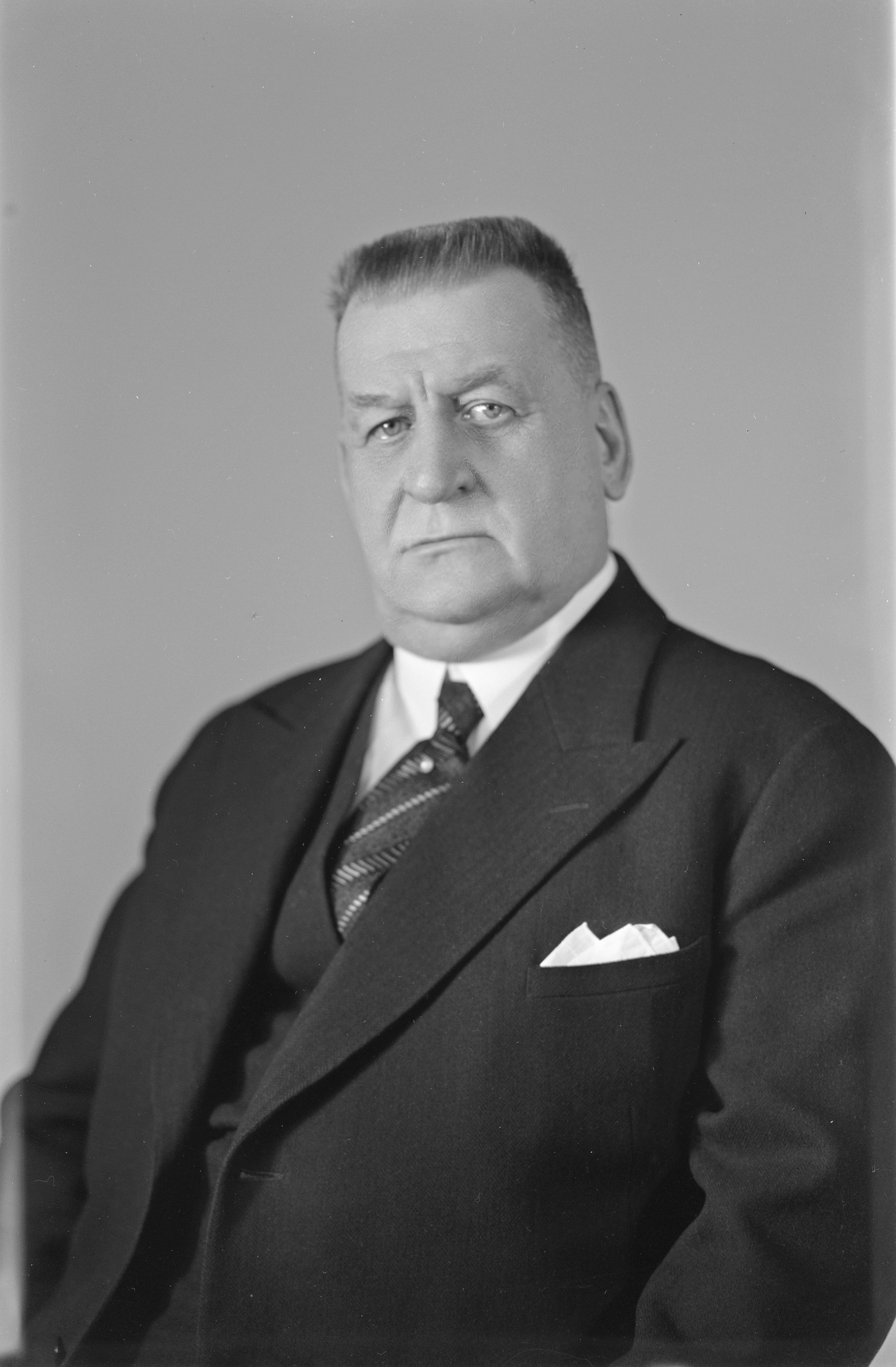
- Renvall in 1939
- Born: Henrik Gabriel Renvall; 19 January 1872; Turku, Grand Duchy of Finland, Russian Empire (now Finland)
- Died: 1 June 1955 (aged 83); Helsinki, Finland
- Occupation: Lawyer

Henrik Gabriel "Heikki" Renvall (19 January 1872 in Turku – 1 June 1955 in Helsinki) was a Finnish lawyer, journalist and the Head of the Editorial Board at the Finnish Ministry of Trade and Industry from 1917–1918. He married opera singer Aino Ackté, and their daughter was Glory Leppänen.

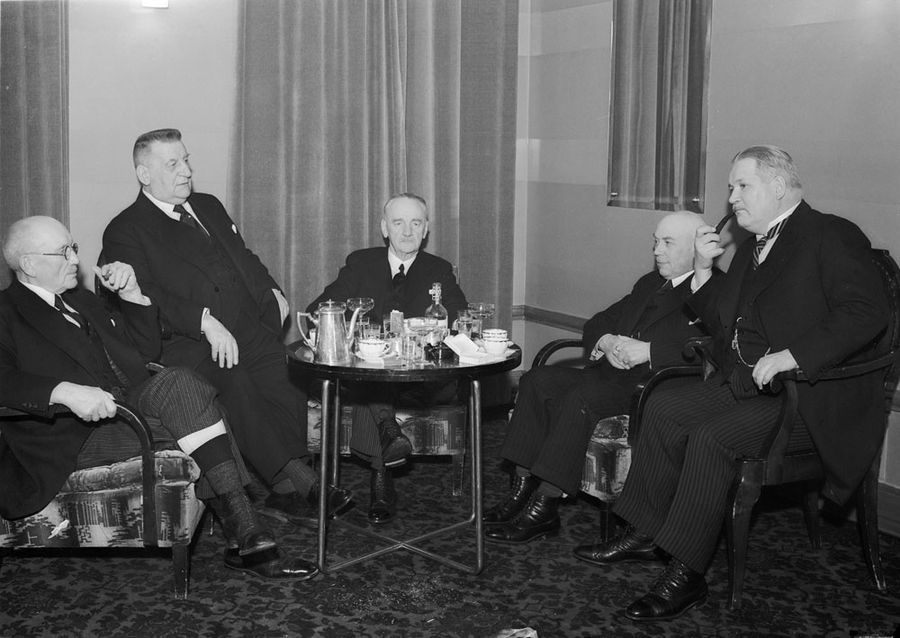
4 January 1940 meeting of the still-living members of the 1917 "Itsenäisyyssenaatti", Svinhufvud's government that brought the vote for Finland's independence to the Finnish senate on 4 December 1917 (Renvall second from left)
