= Eero Yrjö Pehkonen =

Finnish politician

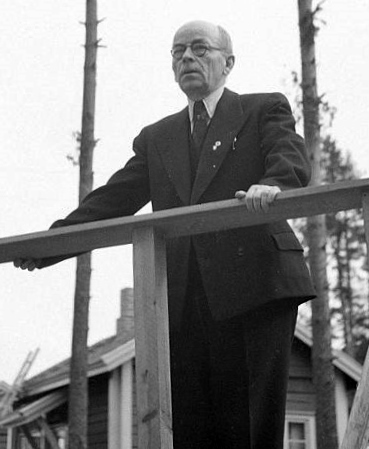
Pehkonen speaking in Oulu in 1943

Eero Yrjö Pehkonen (May 28, 1882 – February 27, 1949) was a Finnish politician, born in Liminka. He was a member of the Senate of Finland. Pehkonen was minister of agriculture of Finland from 1920 until 1921 and governor of the province of Oulu 1925–1948. He died in Oulu.
