= Onni Talas =

Finnish lawyer, politician, professor and diplomat

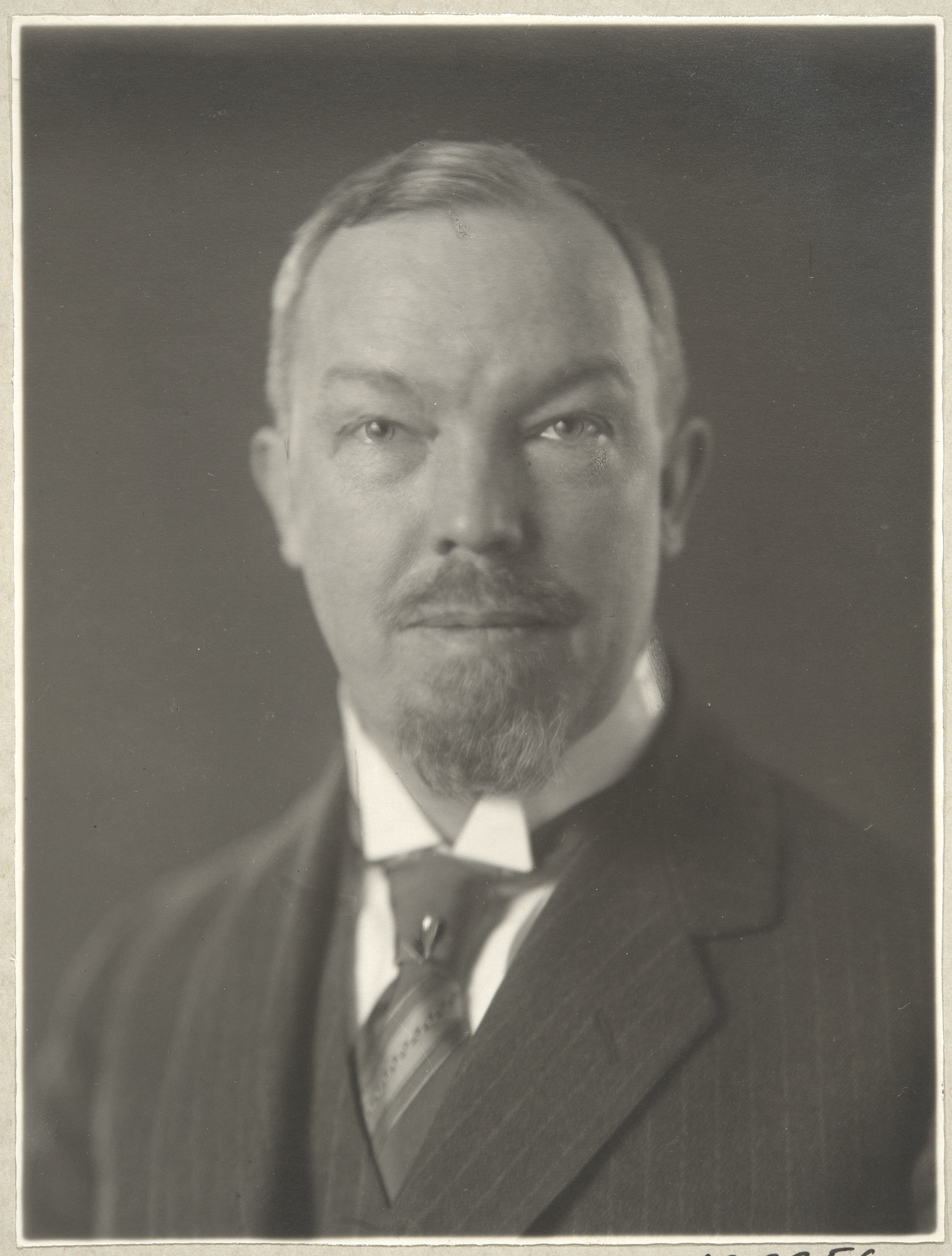
Onni Talas in 1924.

Onni Eugen Aleksander Talas (15 June 1877 – 3 May 1958; till 1895 Gratschoff) was a Finnish lawyer, politician, professor and diplomat, and was a member of the Senate of Finland and member of the National Coalition Party.

== Life and career ==
Talas was born on 15 June 1877 in Lappeenranta. His parents were the Alexander Tertullian Gratschoff and Josefina Katharina Eugenia Wesander. He was the Chargé d'affaires to Madrid and Lisbon (1919–1921) and Envoy to Copenhagen (1930–1934), Budapest (1931–1940), Vienna (1933–1938), Ankara (1934–1940), Sofia (1934–1940), Belgrade (1934–1940), Rome (1940–1944) and the Independent State of Croatia (1941–1942). He was a professor of administrative law at the University of Helsinki in 1925 to 1930.

He died in Helsinki, aged 80. A memoir edited by his widow Lemmikki Talas was published in 1960.
