= Alexander Frey (politician) =

Finnish politician

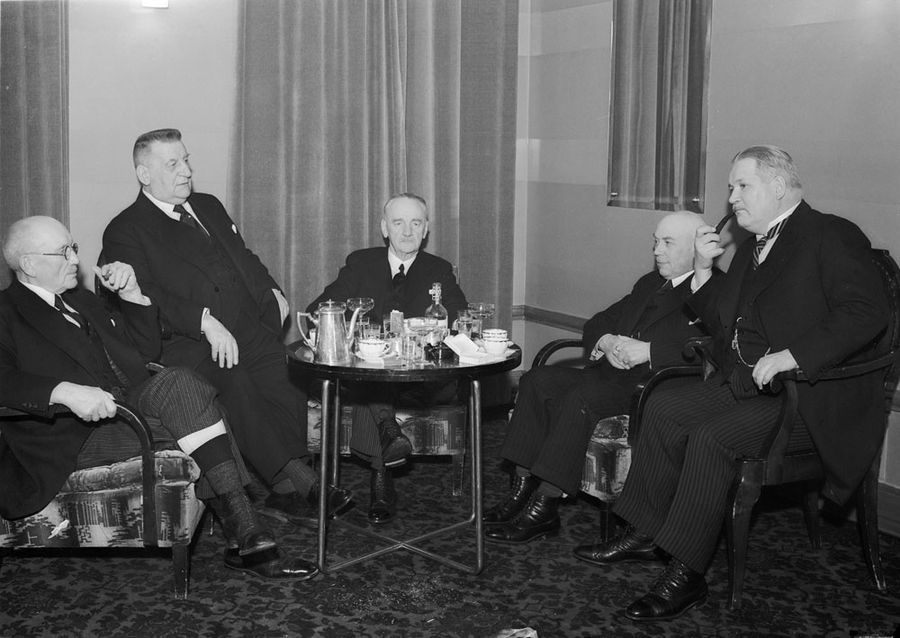
Alexander Frey (second from right) in 1940

Alexander Frey (7 June 1877 Vehkalahti - 28 November 1945 Helsinki) was a Finnish senator, banker and was in the Finnish delegation of Treaty of Tartu between Finland and Russia. He was in Finnish parliament from 1916 to 1917. Frey was a Chairman of the Board in Pohjoismaiden Yhdyspankki (nowadays part of Nordea) in 1928 - 1945.
