= Jalmar Castrén =

Finnish politician

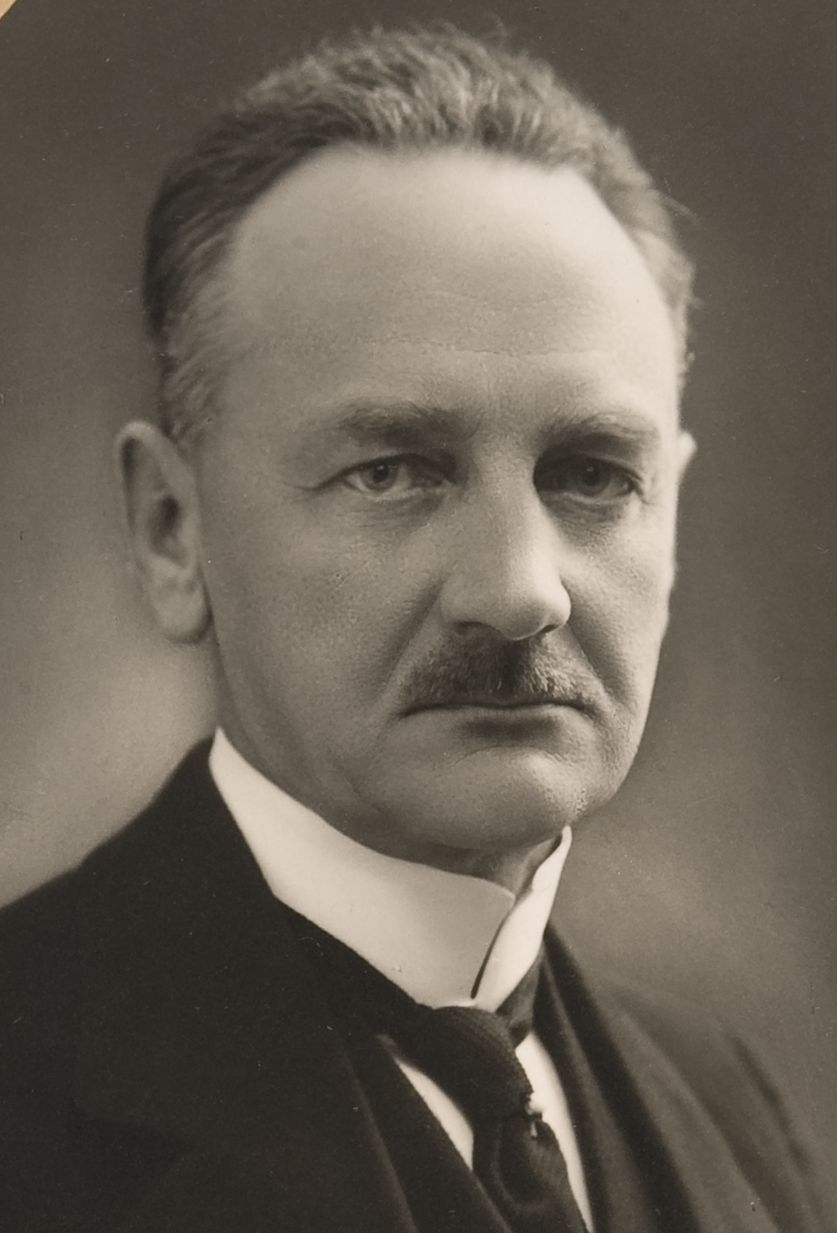
Jalmar Castrén

Jalmar Castrén (14 December 1873 – 19 February 1946) was a Finnish politician. He was a member of the Senate of Finland. He served three times as Minister of Transport and Public Works.

Jalmar Castrén was born in Alatornio, Finland (1873). He died in Helsinki at the age of 72 (1946).
