= Juhani Arajärvi =

Finnish politician (1867–1941)

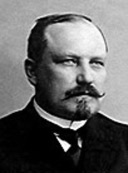
Juhani Arajärvi

Juhani Arajärvi (25 July 1867, Urjala – 13 November 1941) was a Finnish politician. He was a member of the Senate of Finland. Arajärvi was Minister of Finance from 1917 to 1918.
