= List of diplomatic missions of Russia =

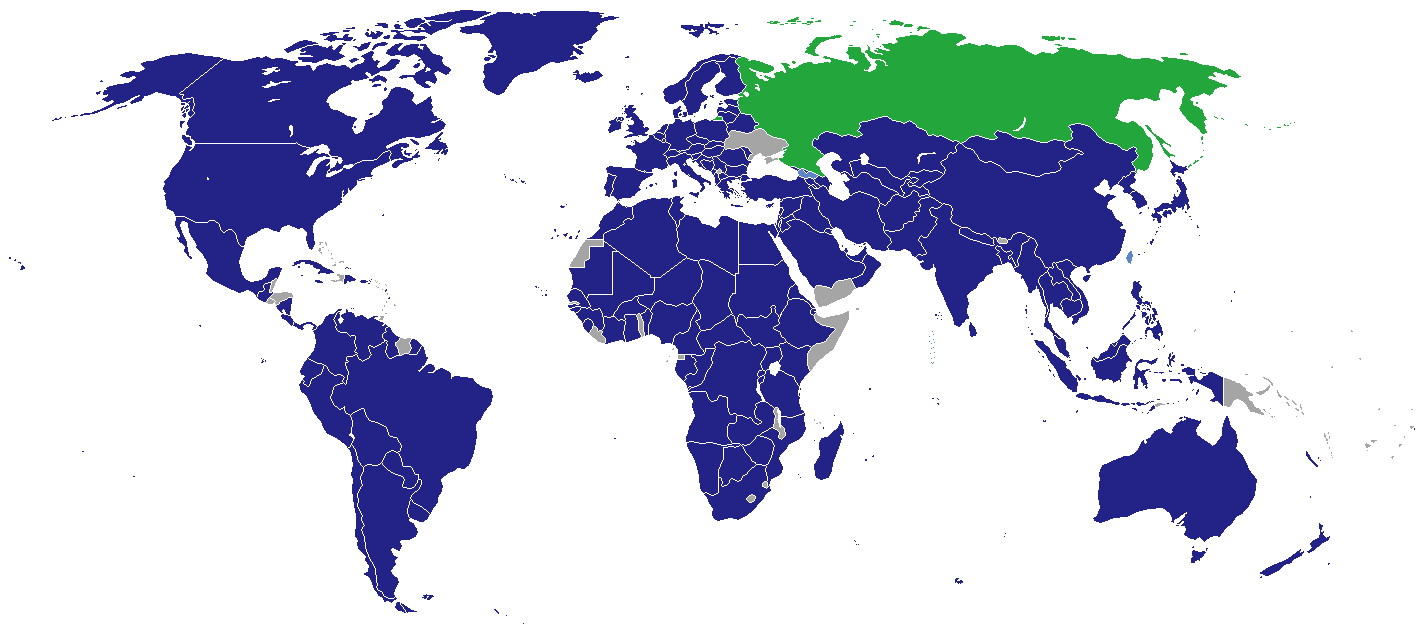
Russian diplomatic missions

This is a list of diplomatic missions of Russia. These missions are subordinate to the Russian Ministry of Foreign Affairs. The Russian Federation has one of the largest networks of embassies and consulates of any country. Russia has significant interests in Eastern Europe, the Near East and especially in the former states of the Soviet Union. It also has extensive ties to countries in the developing world, a legacy of Cold War diplomatic efforts to extend the Soviet Union's influence in Africa and Asia which are now more important for commercial reasons.

Russia established several consulates in the United States and Canada to cater to Russian immigrants. In 1917, the Tsarist government vanished, with a number of consuls who maintained tsarist loyalties establishing the "Council of Ambassadors" (Russian: Совещания послов), through which they worked as embassies without a government. Among these were consuls in seven U.S. cities and three Canadian cities, receiving financing from the U.S. government. The consuls stopped their services in the late 1920s; the U.S. government seized the records of the consulates. The seizure started a long dispute. The National Archives and Records Administration received the documents in 1949. In 1980 the U.S. government loaned the documents of the Canadian consulates to the Library and Archives Canada. On 31 January 1990 the U.S. returned the documents to the Soviet Union and kept the microfilms as evidence.

After 1992, due to financial reasons, embassies in Freetown (Sierra Leone), Monrovia (Liberia), Maseru (Lesotho), Mogadishu (Somalia), Niamey (Niger), Ouagadougou (Burkina Faso), and Port Moresby (Papua New Guinea) were closed. In 1995 the embassy in Paramaribo (Suriname) also suspended operations.

The Russian Federation has no diplomatic relations with Bhutan and Solomon Islands. Since Georgia and Russia severed diplomatic relations in 2008, the Swiss embassy in Tbilisi hosts a Russian interests section.

In February 2022, Micronesia and Ukraine severed diplomatic relations with Russia.

Russia reached agreements to open or reopen diplomatic missions in Burkina Faso, South Sudan, and Equatorial Guinea in July 2023, and Maldives in March 2024. The embassy in Burkina Faso was opened in December 2023, and the General Consulate in Maldives in March 2024.

== Current missions ==
=== Africa ===
Host country	Host city	Mission	Concurrent accreditation	Ref.
Algeria	Algiers	Embassy		
Angola	Luanda	Embassy	Countries: São Tomé and Príncipe	
Benin	Cotonou	Embassy	Countries: Togo	
Botswana	Gaborone	Embassy		
Burkina Faso	Ouagadougou	Embassy		
Burundi	Bujumbura	Embassy		
Cameroon	Yaoundé	Embassy		
Cape Verde	Praia	Embassy		
Central African Republic	Bangui	Embassy		
Chad	N'Djamena	Embassy		
Congo-Brazzaville	Brazzaville	Embassy		
Congo-Kinshasa	Kinshasa	Embassy		
Djibouti	Djibouti	Embassy	Countries: Somalia	
Egypt	Cairo	Embassy		
Egypt	Alexandria	Consulate General		
Egypt	Hurghada	Consulate General		
Equatorial Guinea	Malabo	Embassy		
Eritrea	Asmara	Embassy		
Ethiopia	Addis Ababa	Embassy		
Gabon	Libreville	Embassy		
Gambia	Banjul	Embassy		
Ghana	Accra	Embassy	Countries: Liberia	
Guinea	Conakry	Embassy		
Guinea-Bissau	Bissau	Embassy		
Ivory Coast	Abidjan	Embassy		
Kenya	Nairobi	Embassy		
Libya	Tripoli	Embassy		
Libya	Benghazi	Consulate General		
Madagascar	Antananarivo	Embassy	Countries: Comoros	
Mali	Bamako	Embassy		
Mauritania	Nouakchott	Embassy		
Mauritius	Port Louis	Embassy		
Morocco	Rabat	Embassy		
Morocco	Casablanca	Consulate-General		
Mozambique	Maputo	Embassy	Countries: Eswatini	
Namibia	Windhoek	Embassy		
Niger	Niamey	Embassy		
Nigeria	Abuja	Embassy		
Nigeria	Lagos	Consulate General		
Rwanda	Kigali	Embassy		
Senegal	Dakar	Embassy		
Seychelles	Victoria	Embassy		
Sierra Leone	Freetown	Embassy		
South Africa	Pretoria	Embassy	Countries: Lesotho	
South Africa	Cape Town	Consulate-General	Countries: Lesotho	
South Sudan	Juba	Embassy		
Sudan	Khartoum	Embassy		
Tanzania	Dar es Salaam	Embassy		
Tunisia	Tunis	Embassy		
Uganda	Kampala	Embassy		
Zambia	Lusaka	Embassy		
Zimbabwe	Harare	Embassy	Countries: Malawi	

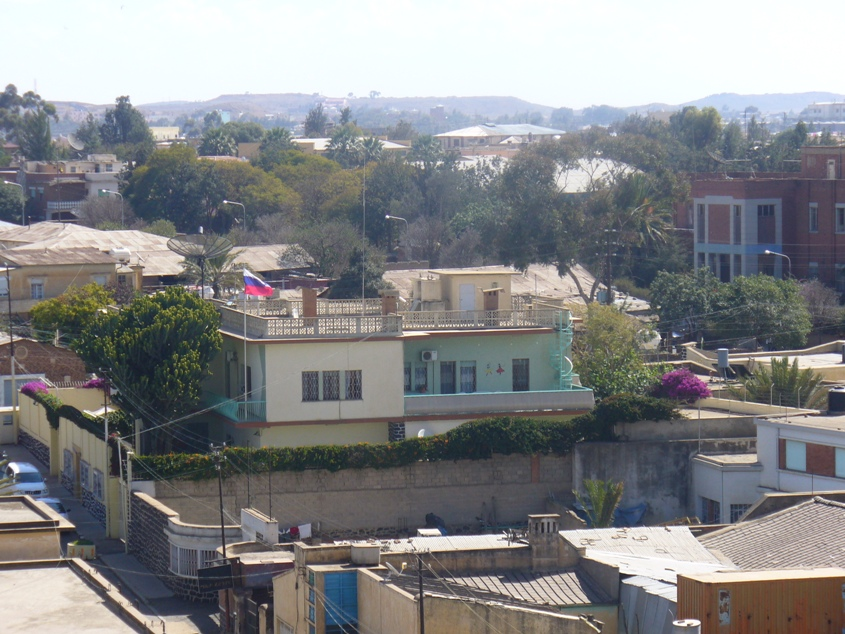
Embassy in Asmara

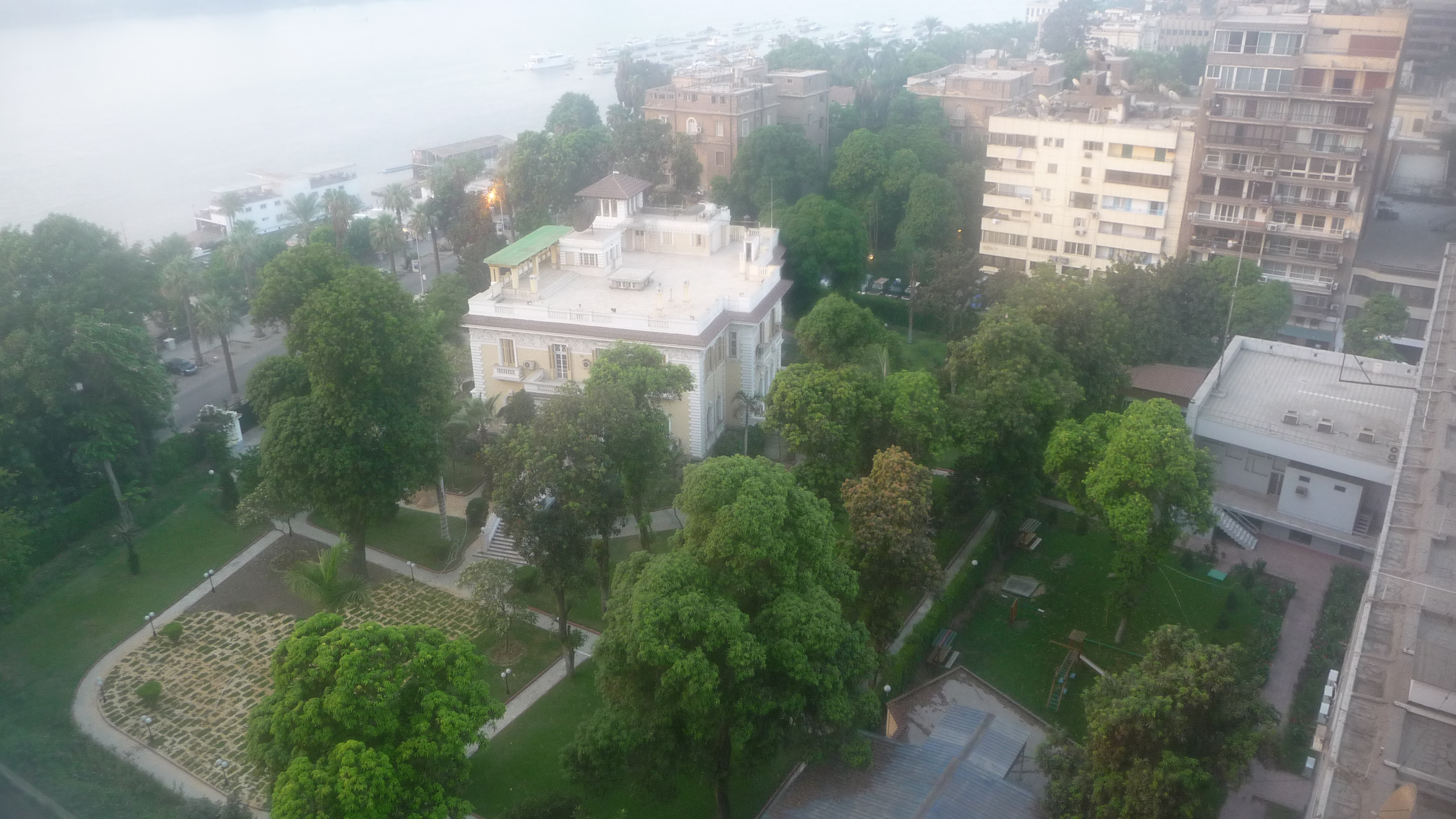
Embassy in Cairo

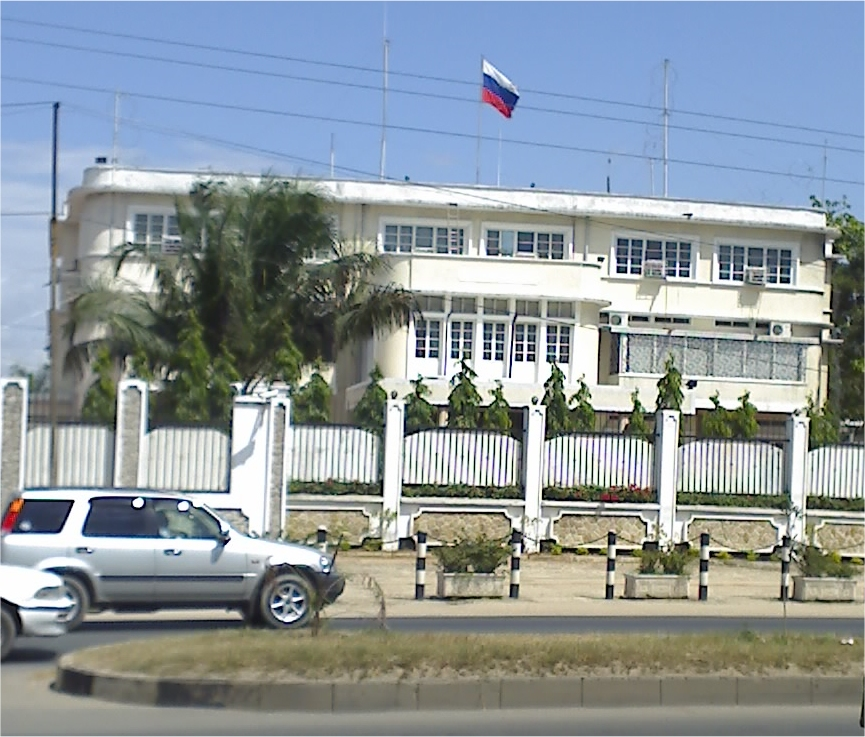
Embassy in Dar es Salaam

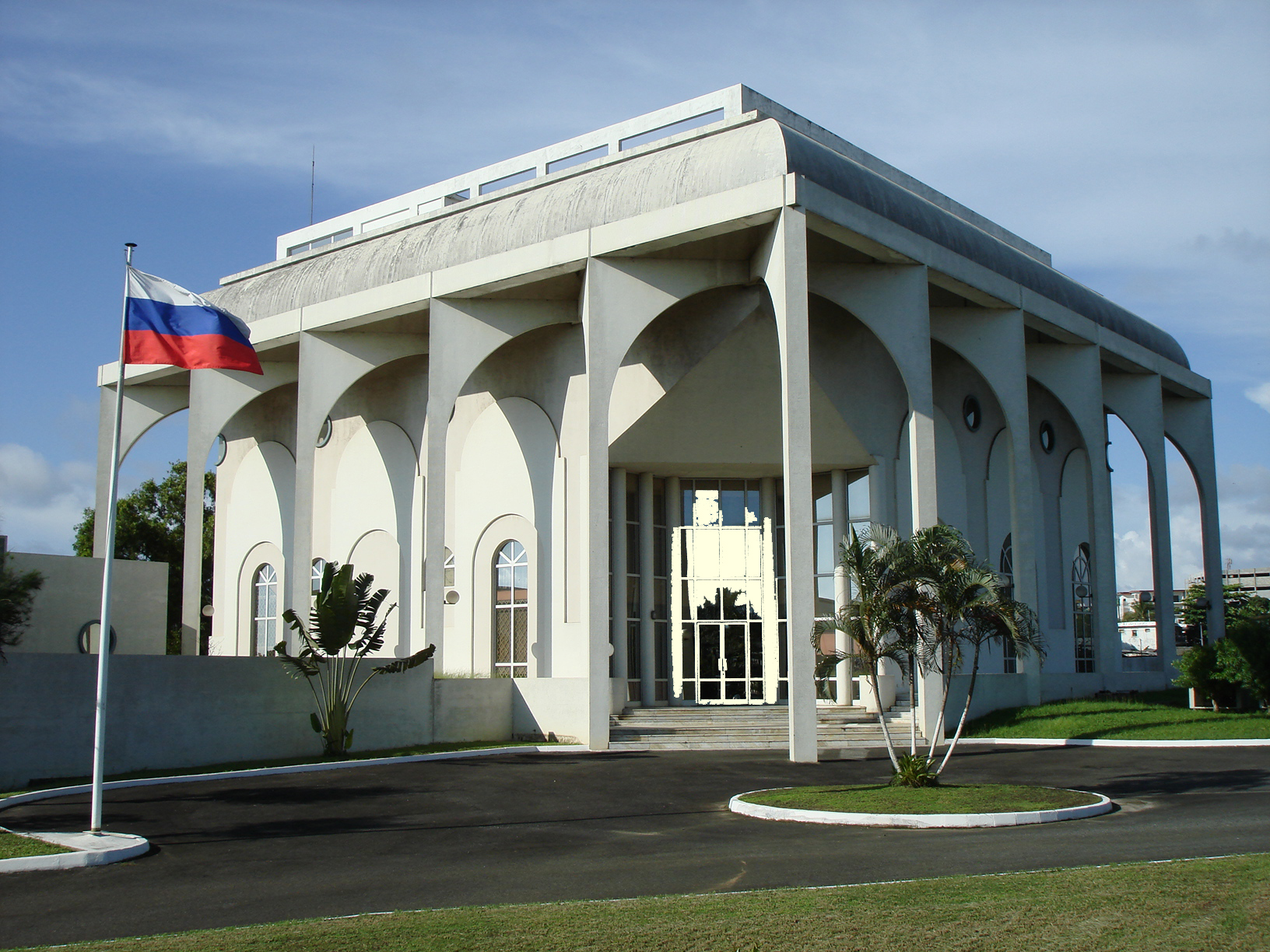
Embassy in Libreville

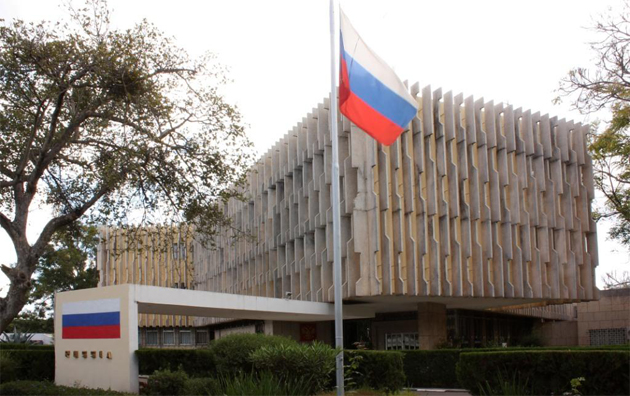
Embassy in Lusaka

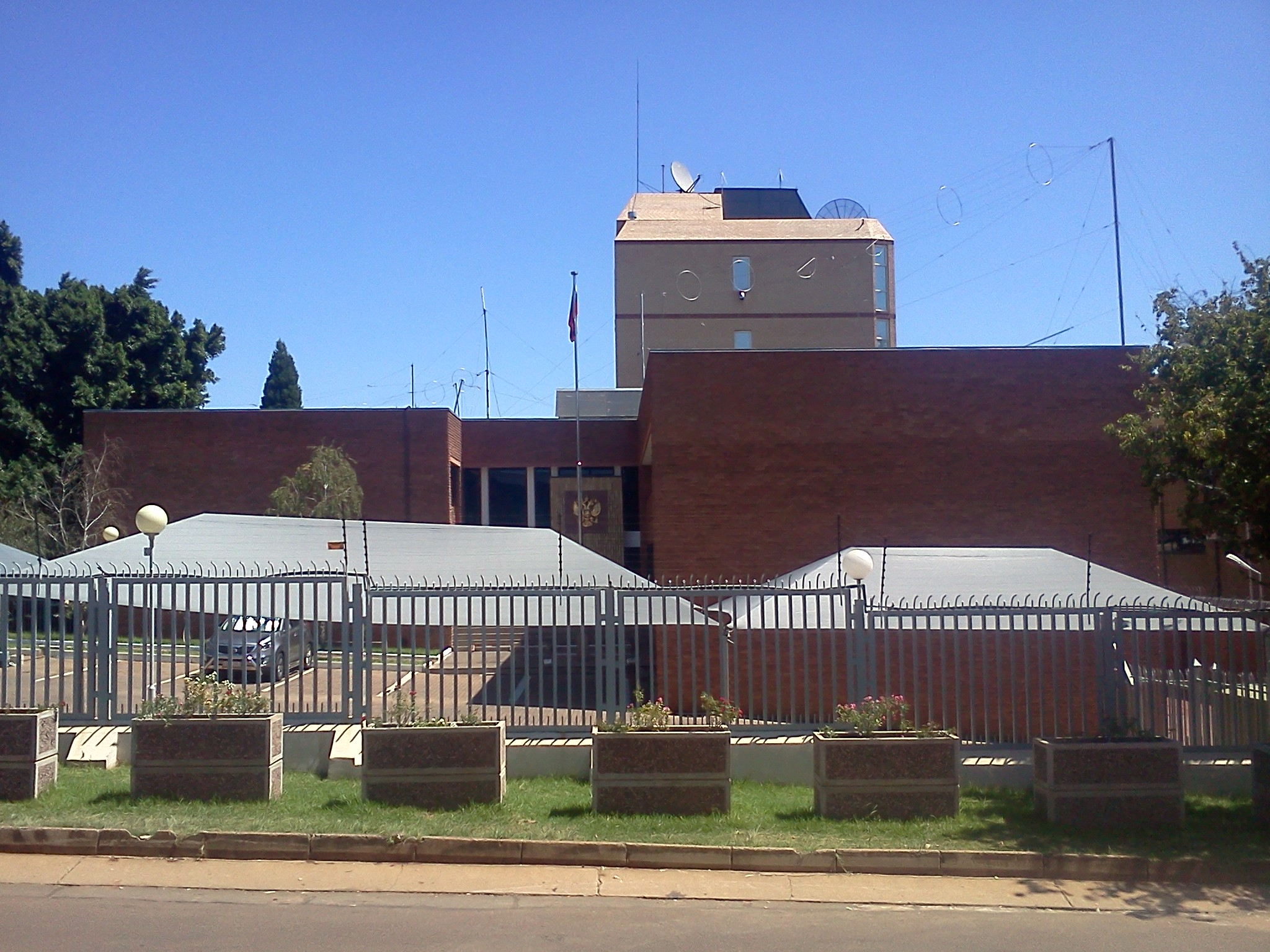
Embassy in Pretoria

=== Americas ===
Host country	Host city	Mission	Concurrent accreditation	Ref.
Argentina	Buenos Aires	Embassy		
Bolivia	La Paz	Embassy		
Brazil	Brasília	Embassy	Countries: Suriname	
Brazil	Rio de Janeiro	Consulate-General	Countries: Suriname	
Brazil	São Paulo	Consulate-General	Countries: Suriname	
Canada	Ottawa	Embassy		
Canada	Montreal	Consulate-General		
Canada	Toronto	Consulate-General		
Chile	Santiago de Chile	Embassy		
Colombia	Bogotá	Embassy		
Costa Rica	San José	Embassy		
Cuba	Havana	Embassy	Countries: Bahamas	
Cuba	Santiago de Cuba	Consulate General	Countries: Bahamas	
Dominican Republic	Santo Domingo	Embassy		
Ecuador	Quito	Embassy		
Guatemala	Guatemala City	Embassy		
Guyana	Georgetown	Embassy	Countries: Barbados; Grenada; Saint Vincent and the Grenadines; Trinidad and Tobago	
Jamaica	Kingston	Embassy	Countries: Antigua and Barbuda; Dominica; Saint Kitts and Nevis; Saint Lucia	
Mexico	Mexico City	Embassy	Countries: Belize	
Nicaragua	Managua	Embassy	Countries: El Salvador; Honduras	
Panama	Panama City	Embassy		
Paraguay	Asunción	Embassy		
Peru	Lima	Embassy		
United States	Washington, D.C.	Embassy		
United States	Houston	Consulate-General		
United States	New York City	Consulate-General		
Uruguay	Montevideo	Embassy		
Venezuela	Caracas	Embassy		

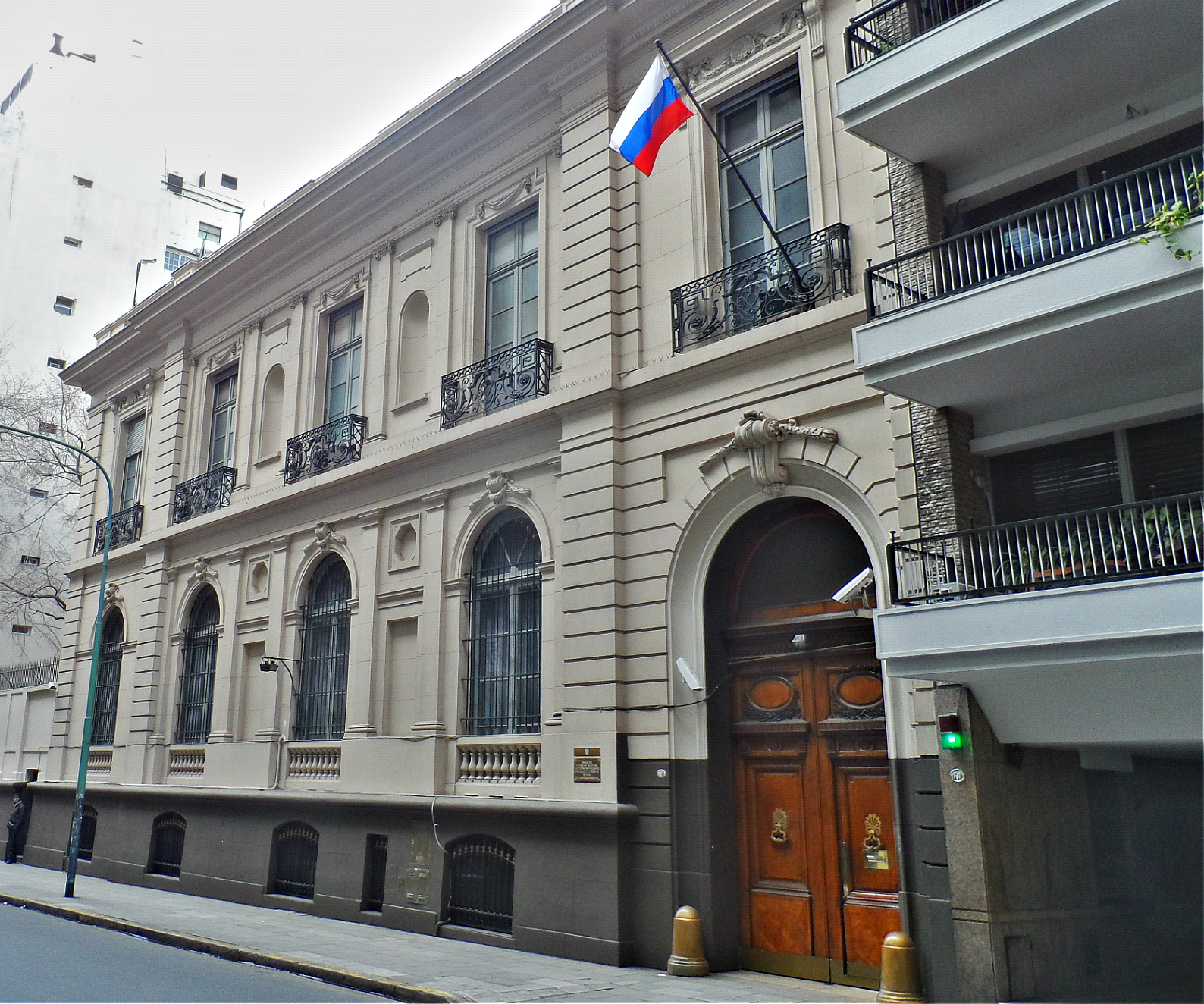
Embassy in Buenos Aires

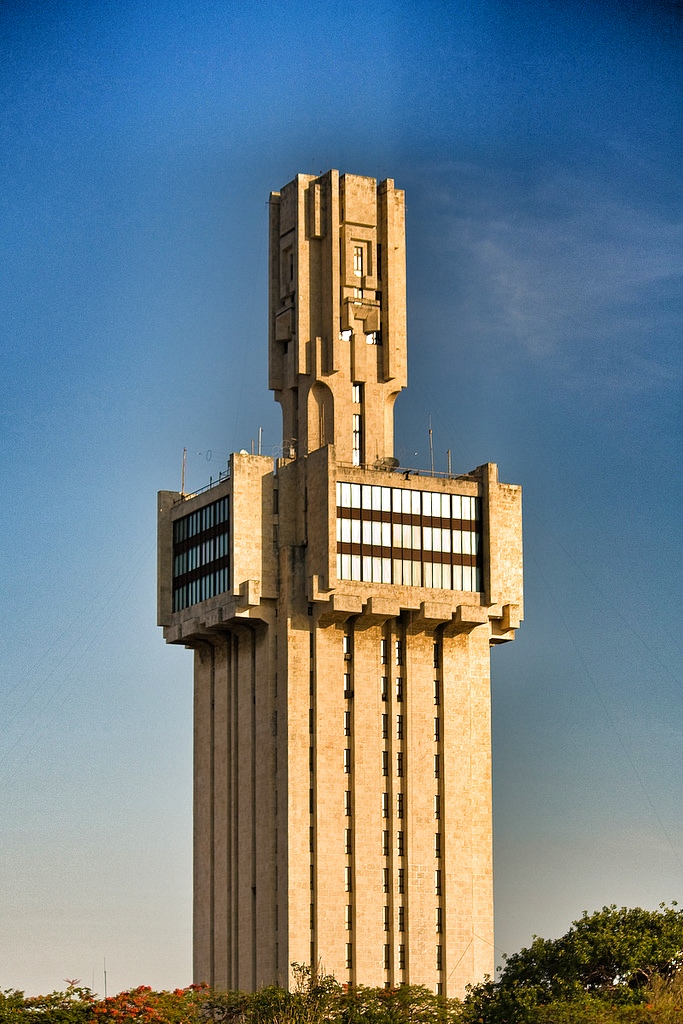
Embassy in Havana

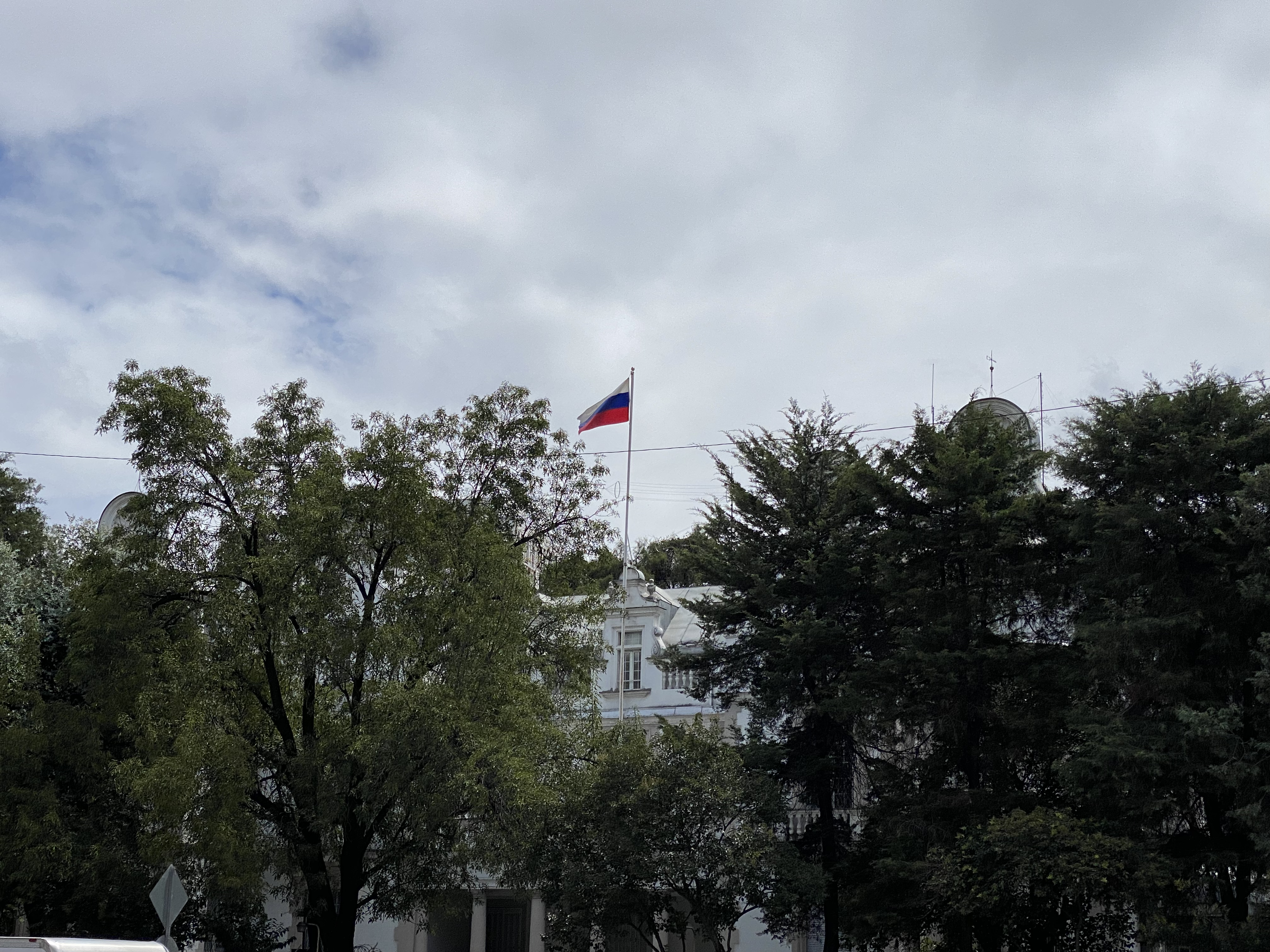
Embassy in Mexico City

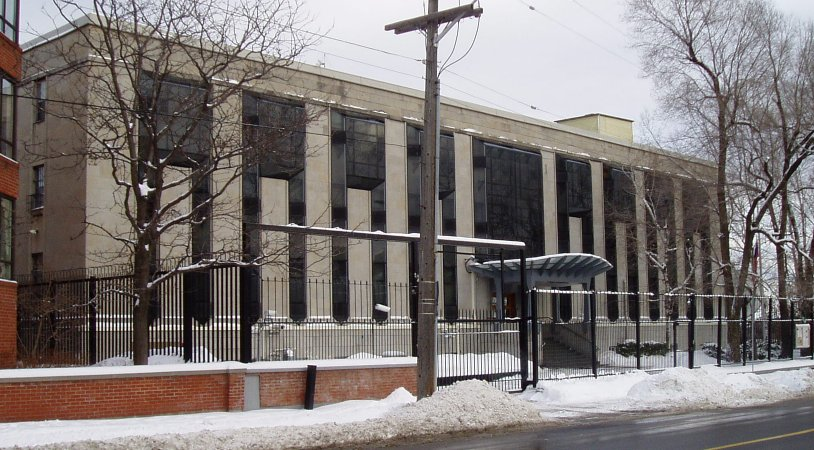
Embassy in Ottawa

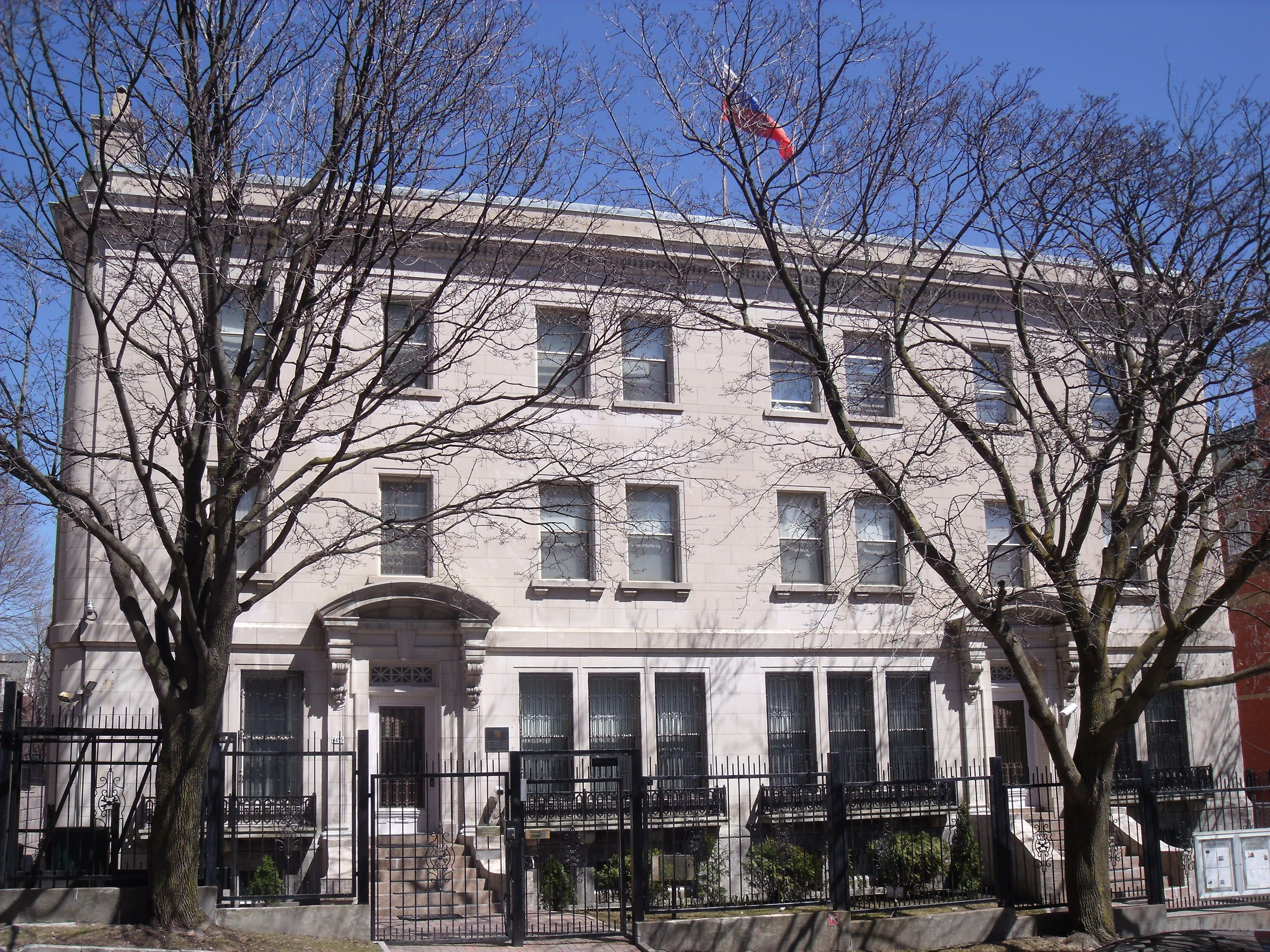
Consulate General in Montreal

Embassy in Quito

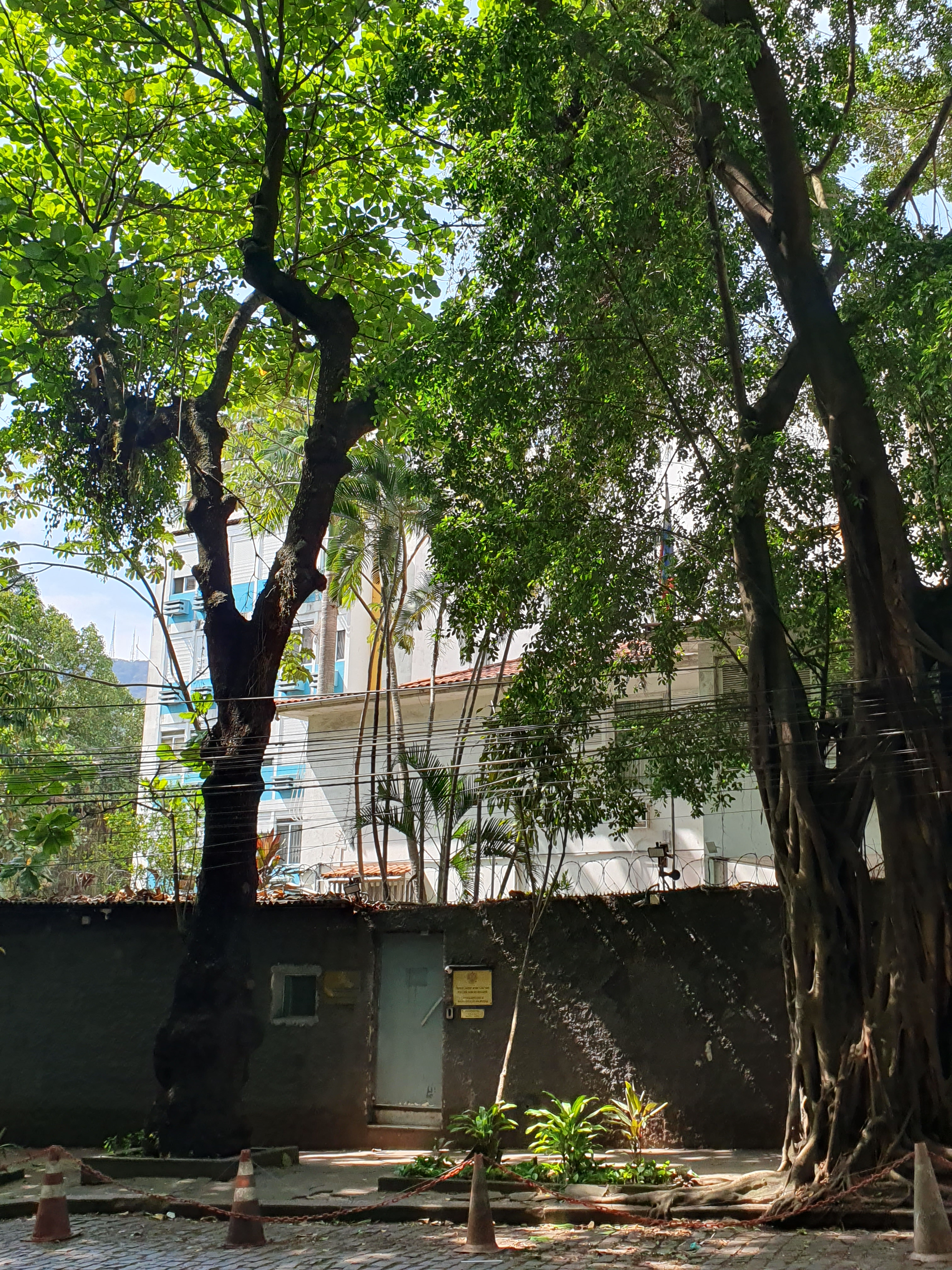
Consulate General in Rio de Janeiro

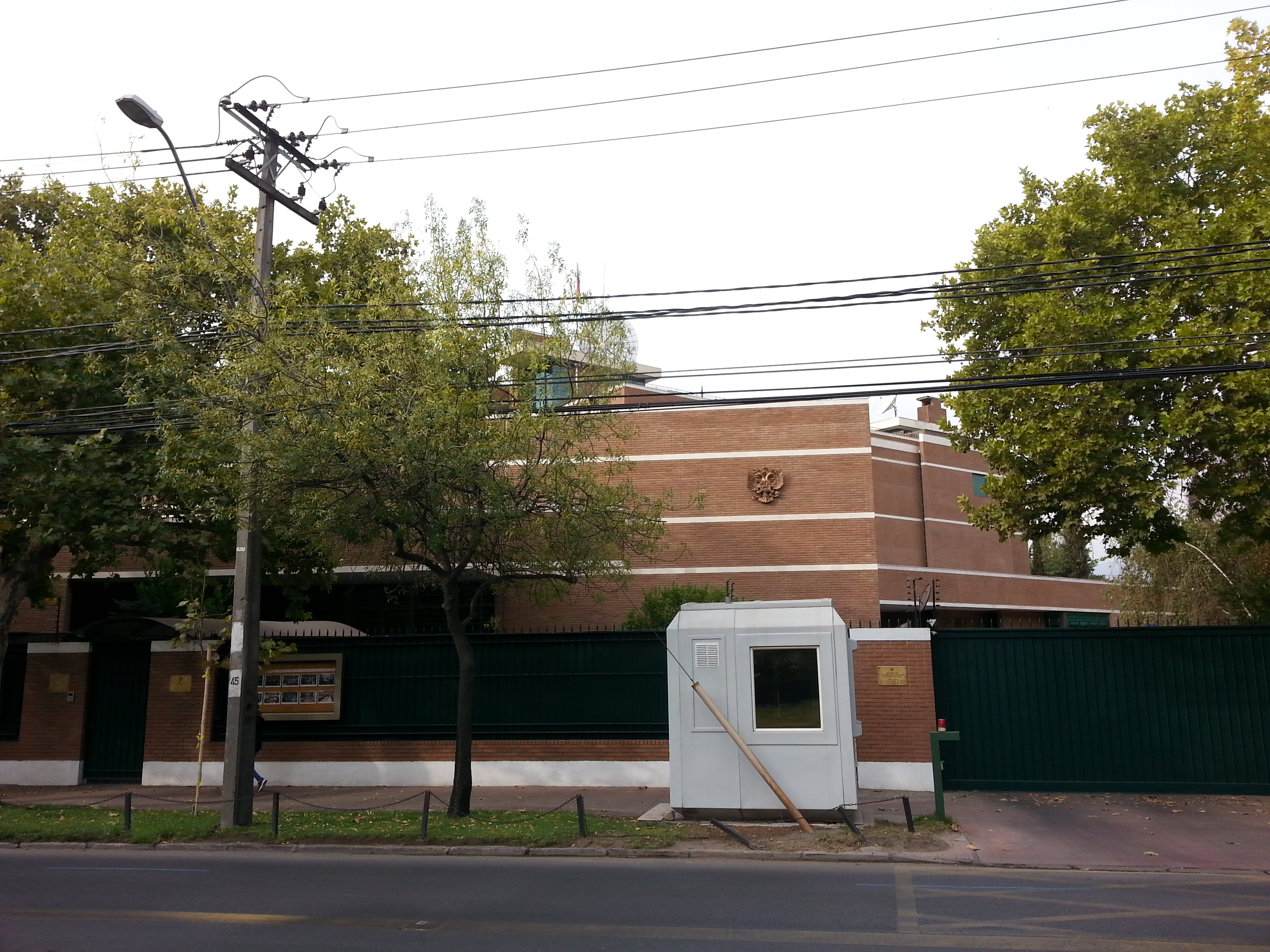
Embassy in Santiago

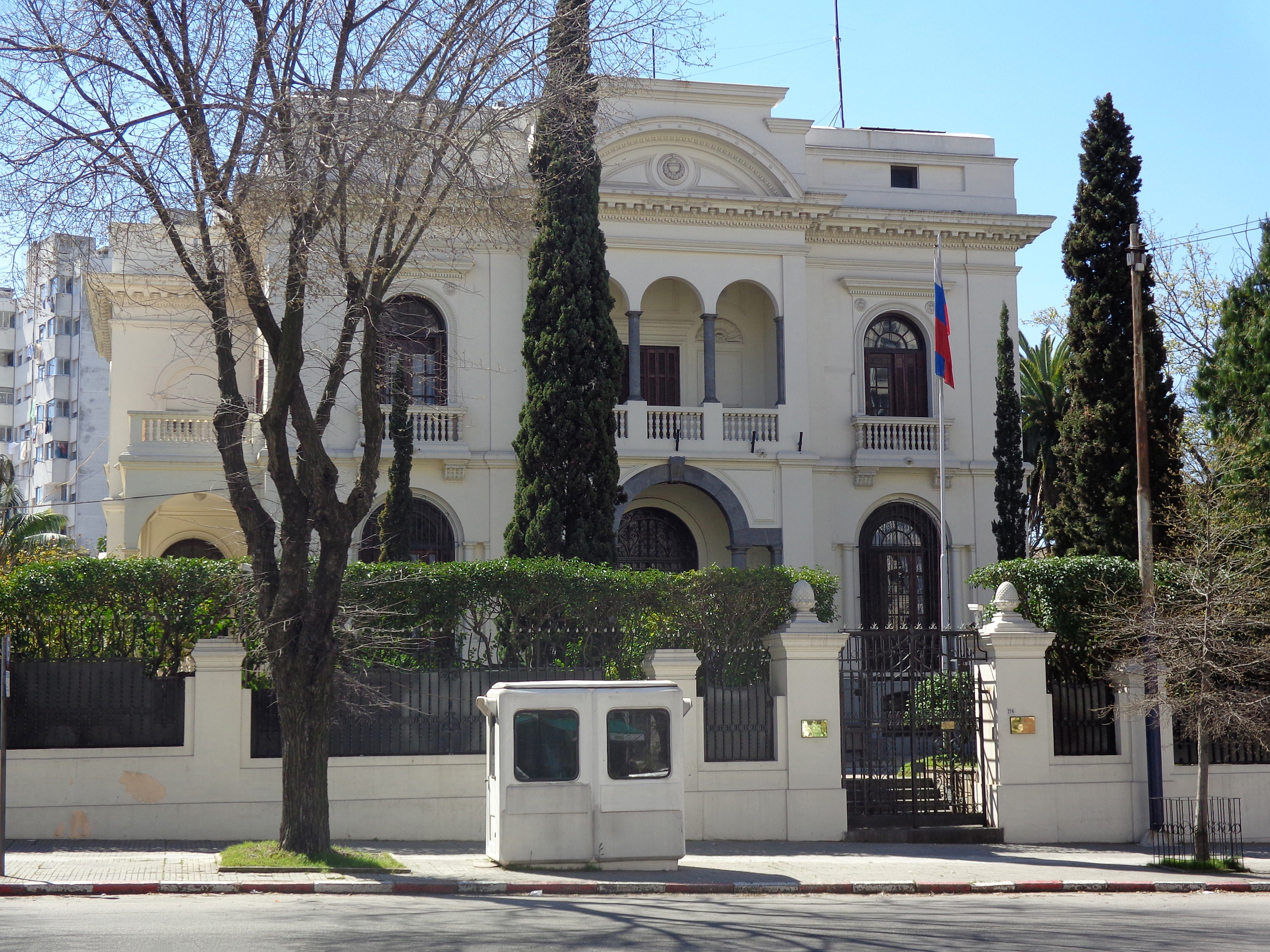
Embassy in Montevideo

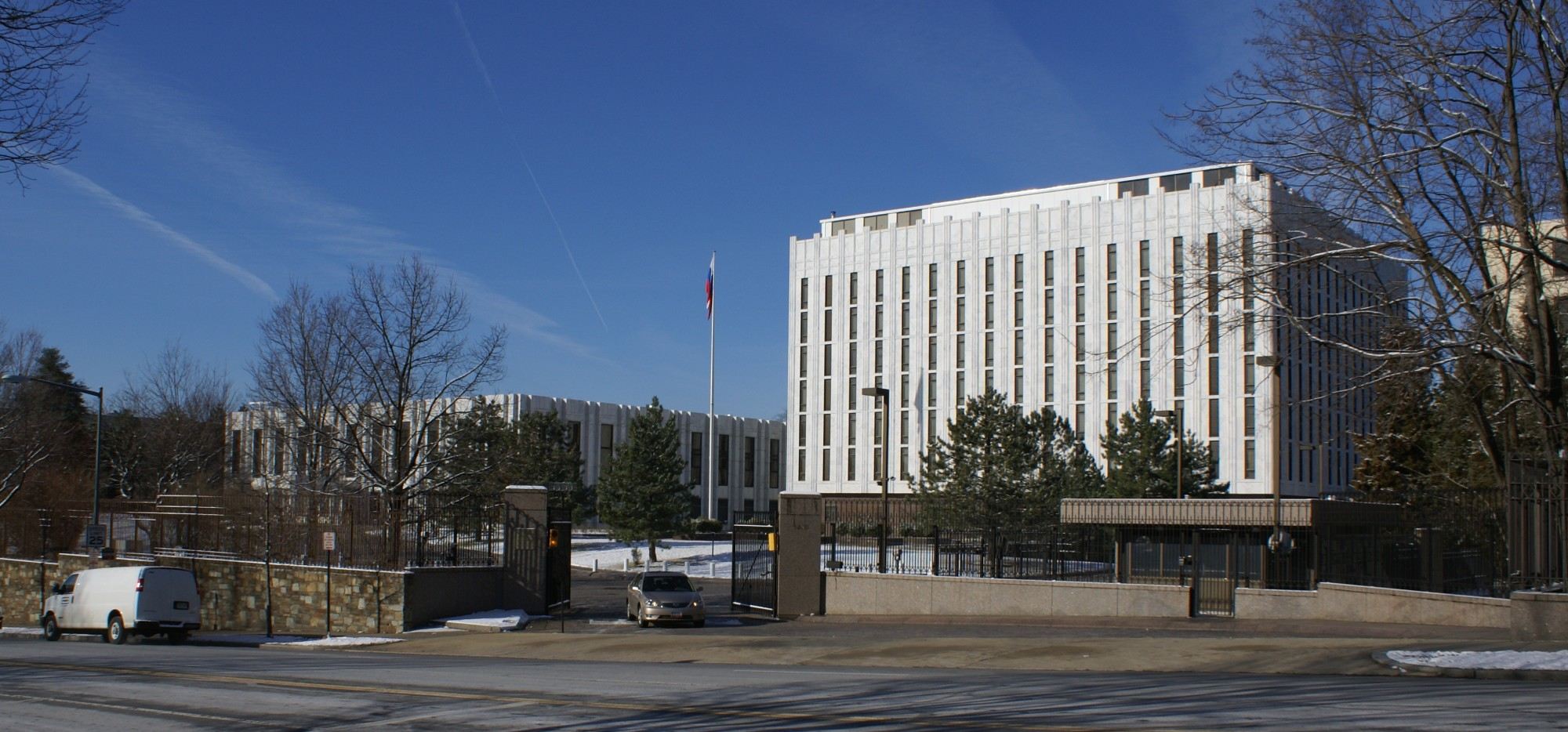
Embassy in Washington, D.C.

Consulate General in New York City

=== Asia ===
Host country	Host city	Mission	Concurrent accreditation	Ref.
Abkhazia	Sukhumi	Embassy		
Afghanistan	Kabul	Embassy		
Afghanistan	Mazar-i-Sharif	Consulate-General		
Armenia	Yerevan	Embassy		
Armenia	Gyumri	Consulate-General		
Azerbaijan	Baku	Embassy		
Bahrain	Manama	Embassy		
Bangladesh	Dhaka	Embassy		
Brunei	Bandar Seri Begawan	Embassy		
Cambodia	Phnom Penh	Embassy		
China	Beijing	Embassy		
China	Guangzhou	Consulate-General		
China	Harbin	Consulate-General		
China	Hong Kong	Consulate-General		
China	Shanghai	Consulate-General		
China	Shenyang	Consulate-General		
Georgia	Tbilisi	Interests Section (Note: Under the protecting power of Switzerland.)		
India	New Delhi	Embassy		
India	Mumbai	Consulate-General		
India	Chennai	Consulate-General		
India	Kolkata	Consulate-General		
Indonesia	Jakarta	Embassy	Countries: East Timor	
Indonesia	Denpasar	Consulate General		
Iran	Tehran	Embassy		
Iran	Isfahan	Consulate-General		
Iran	Rasht	Consulate-General		
Iraq	Baghdad	Embassy		
Iraq	Basra	Consulate-General		
Iraq	Erbil	Consulate-General		
Israel	Tel Aviv	Embassy		
Israel	Haifa	Consulate-General		
Japan	Tokyo	Embassy		
Japan	Niigata	Consulate-General		
Japan	Osaka	Consulate-General		
Japan	Sapporo	Consulate-General		
Japan	Hakodate	Consular office		
Jordan	Amman	Embassy		
Kazakhstan	Astana	Embassy		
Kazakhstan	Aktau	Consulate-General		
Kazakhstan	Almaty	Consulate-General		
Kazakhstan	Oral	Consulate-General		
Kazakhstan	Oskemen	Consulate-General		
Kuwait	Kuwait City	Embassy		
Kyrgyzstan	Bishkek	Embassy		
Kyrgyzstan	Osh	Consulate-General		
Laos	Vientiane	Embassy		
Lebanon	Beirut	Embassy		
Malaysia	Kuala Lumpur	Embassy		
Maldives	Malé	Consulate General		
Mongolia	Ulaanbaatar	Embassy		
Mongolia	Darkhan	Consulate-General		
Mongolia	Erdenet	Consulate-General		
Myanmar	Yangon	Embassy		
Nepal	Kathmandu	Embassy		
North Korea	Pyongyang	Embassy		
North Korea	Chongjin	Consulate-General		
Oman	Muscat	Embassy		
Pakistan	Islamabad	Embassy		
Pakistan	Karachi	Consulate-General		
Palestine	Ramallah	Embassy		
Philippines	Manila	Embassy	Countries: Marshall Islands; Palau	
Qatar	Doha	Embassy		
Saudi Arabia	Riyadh	Embassy		
Saudi Arabia	Jeddah	Consulate-General		
Singapore	Singapore	Embassy		
South Korea	Seoul	Embassy		
South Korea	Busan	Consulate-General		
South Ossetia	Tskhinvali	Embassy		
Sri Lanka	Colombo	Embassy	Countries: Maldives	
Syria	Damascus	Embassy		
Taiwan	Taipei	Representative Office		
Tajikistan	Dushanbe	Embassy		
Tajikistan	Khujand	Consulate-General		
Thailand	Bangkok	Embassy		
Thailand	Phuket	Consulate General		
Turkey	Ankara	Embassy		
Turkey	Antalya	Consulate-General		
Turkey	Istanbul	Consulate-General		
Turkey	Trabzon	Consulate-General		
Turkmenistan	Ashgabat	Embassy		
Turkmenistan	Türkmenbaşy	Consular office		
United Arab Emirates	Abu Dhabi	Embassy		
United Arab Emirates	Dubai	Consulate-General		
Uzbekistan	Tashkent	Embassy		
Vietnam	Hanoi	Embassy		
Vietnam	Danang	Consulate-General		
Vietnam	Ho Chi Minh City	Consulate-General		

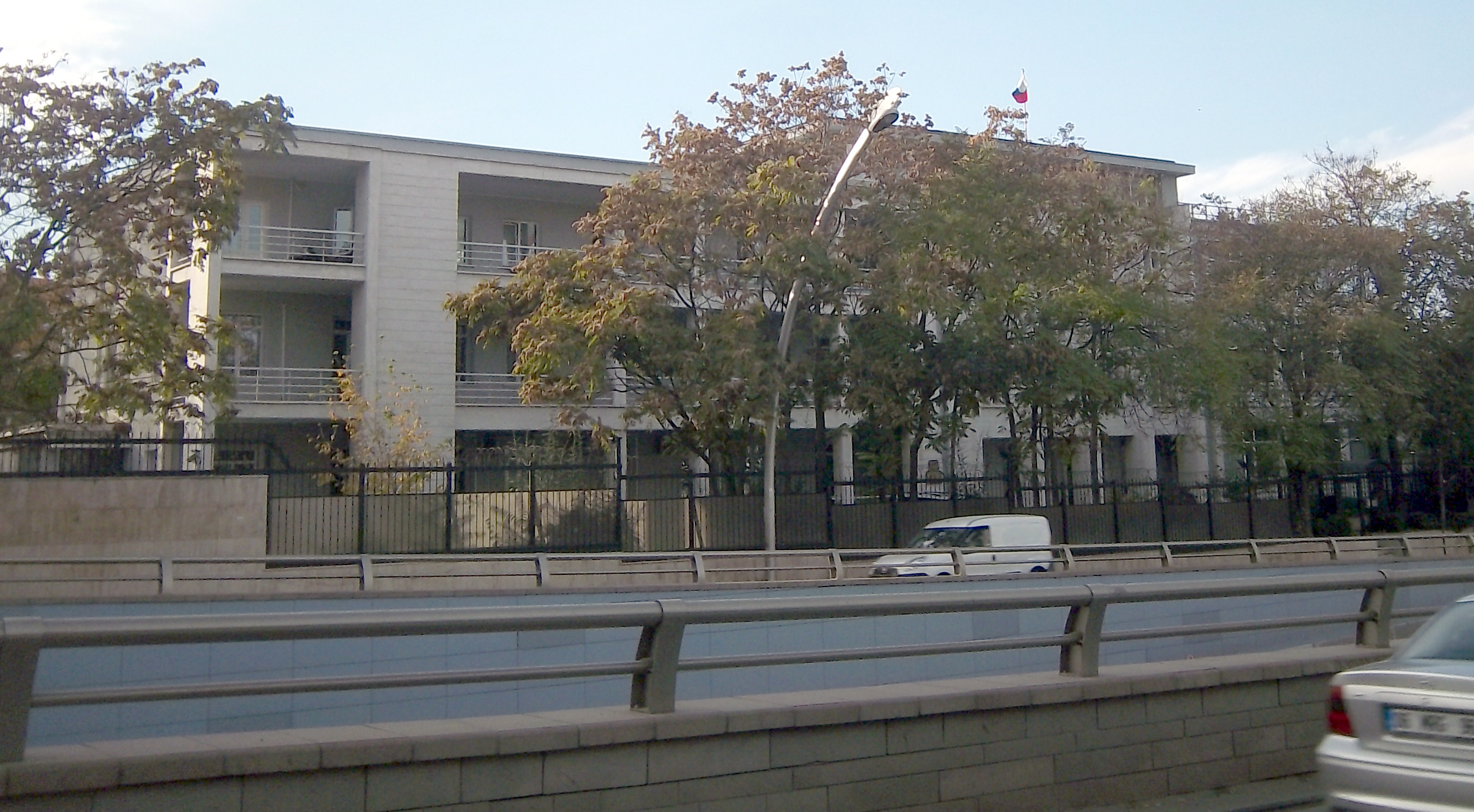
Embassy in Ankara

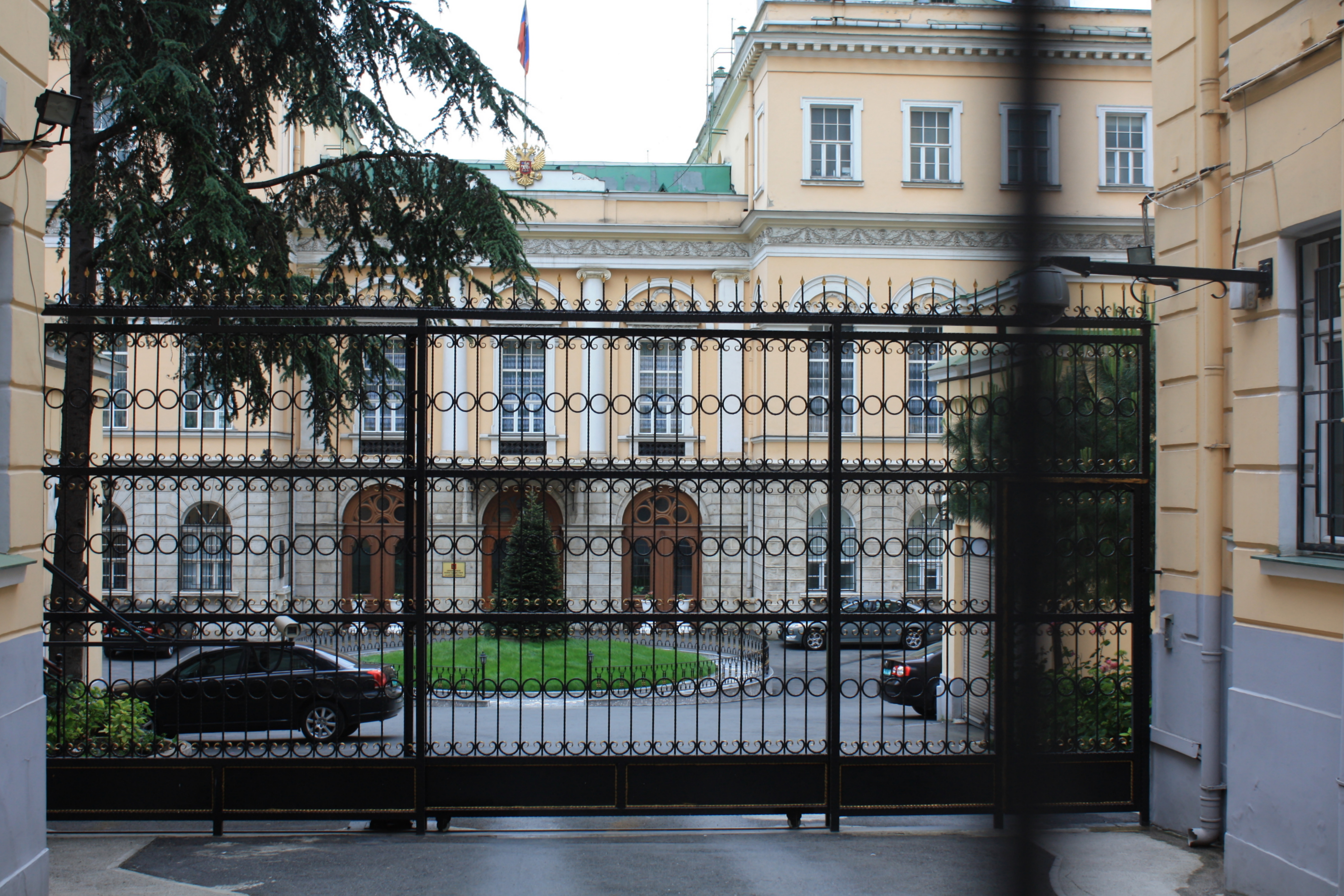
Consulate General in Istanbul

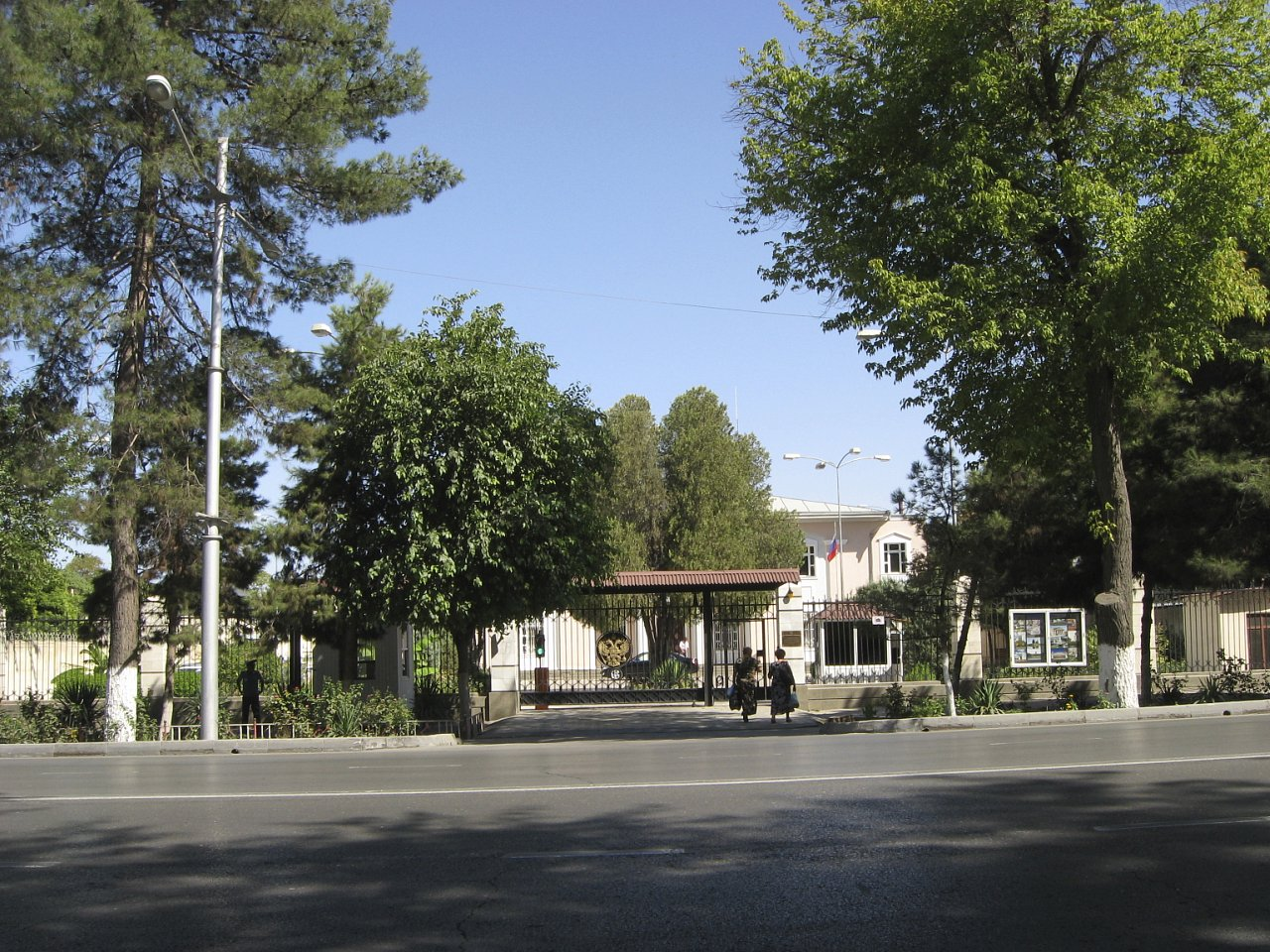
Embassy in Ashgabat

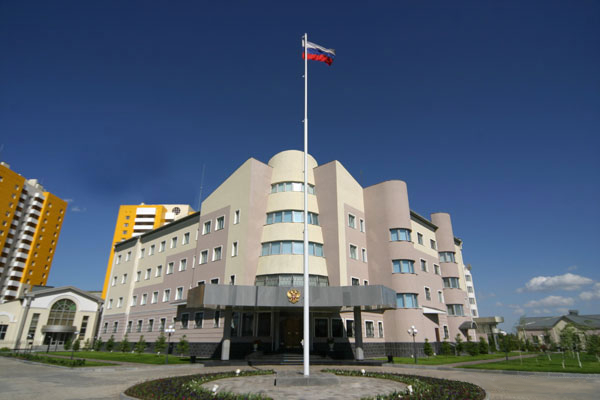
Embassy in Astana

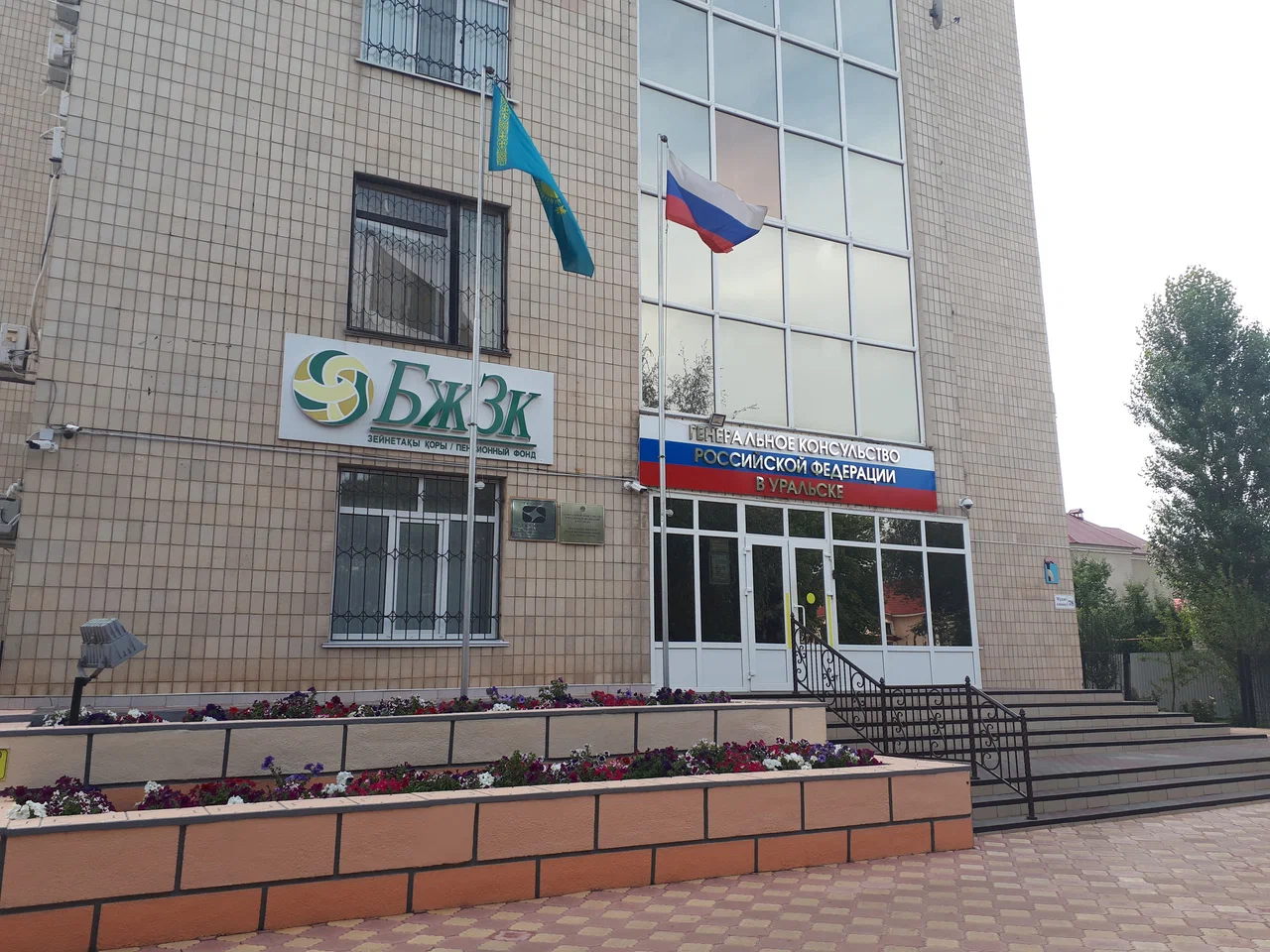
Consulate-General in Oral

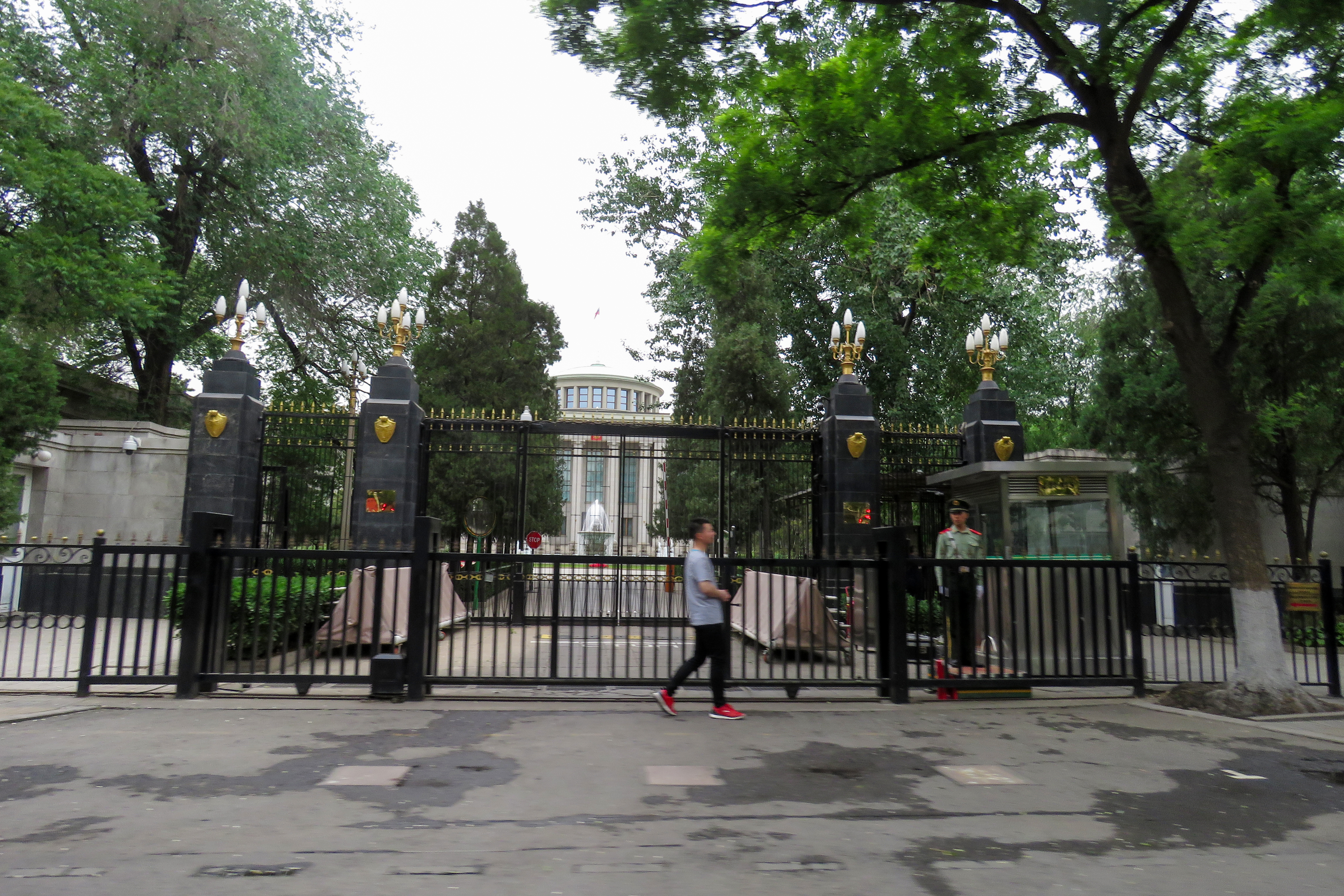
Embassy in Beijing

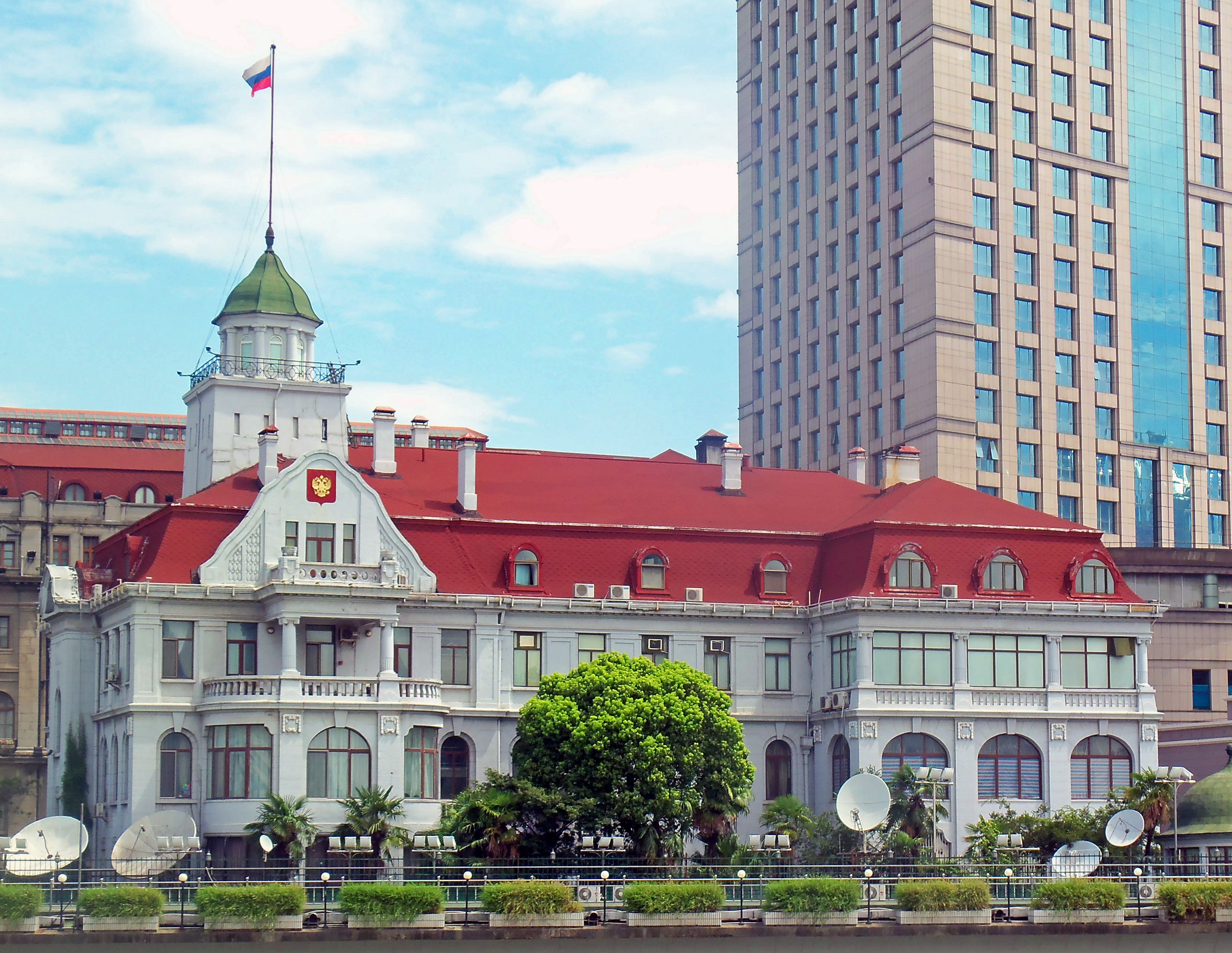
Consulate General in Shanghai

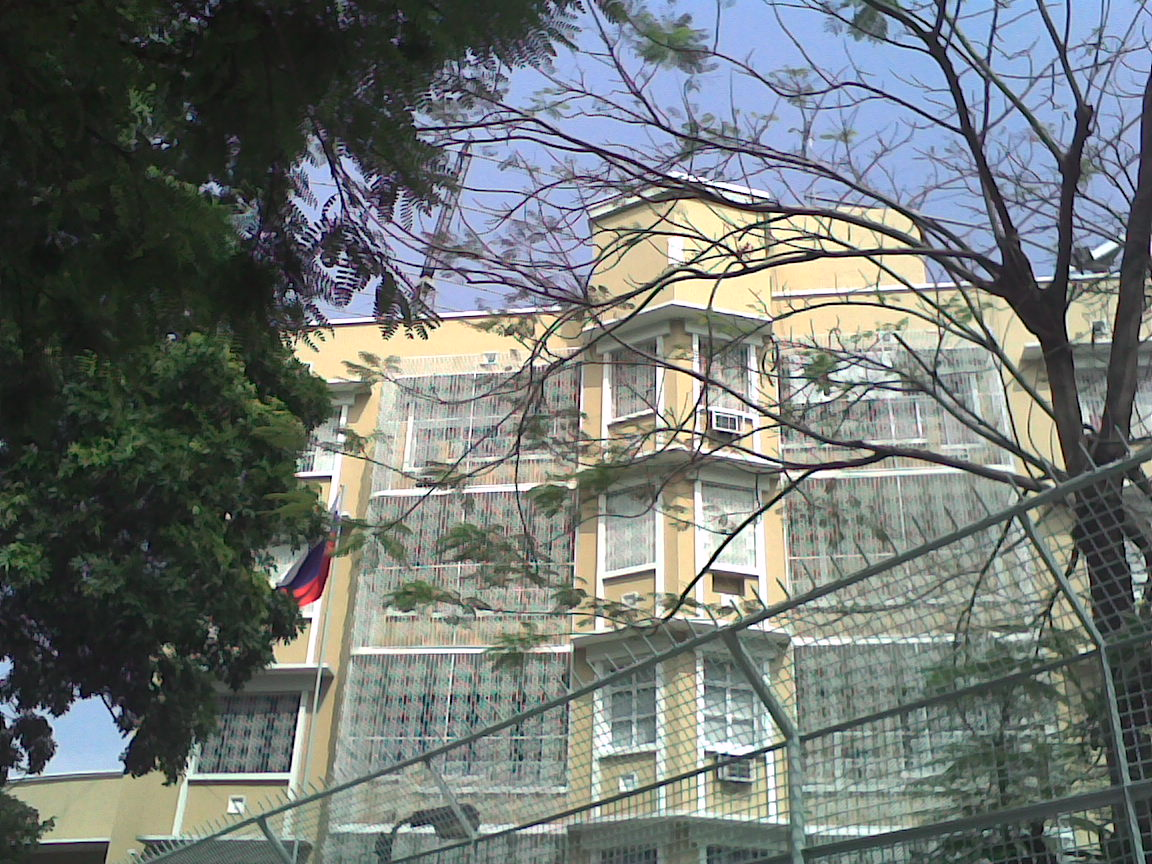
Consulate General in Ho Chi Minh City

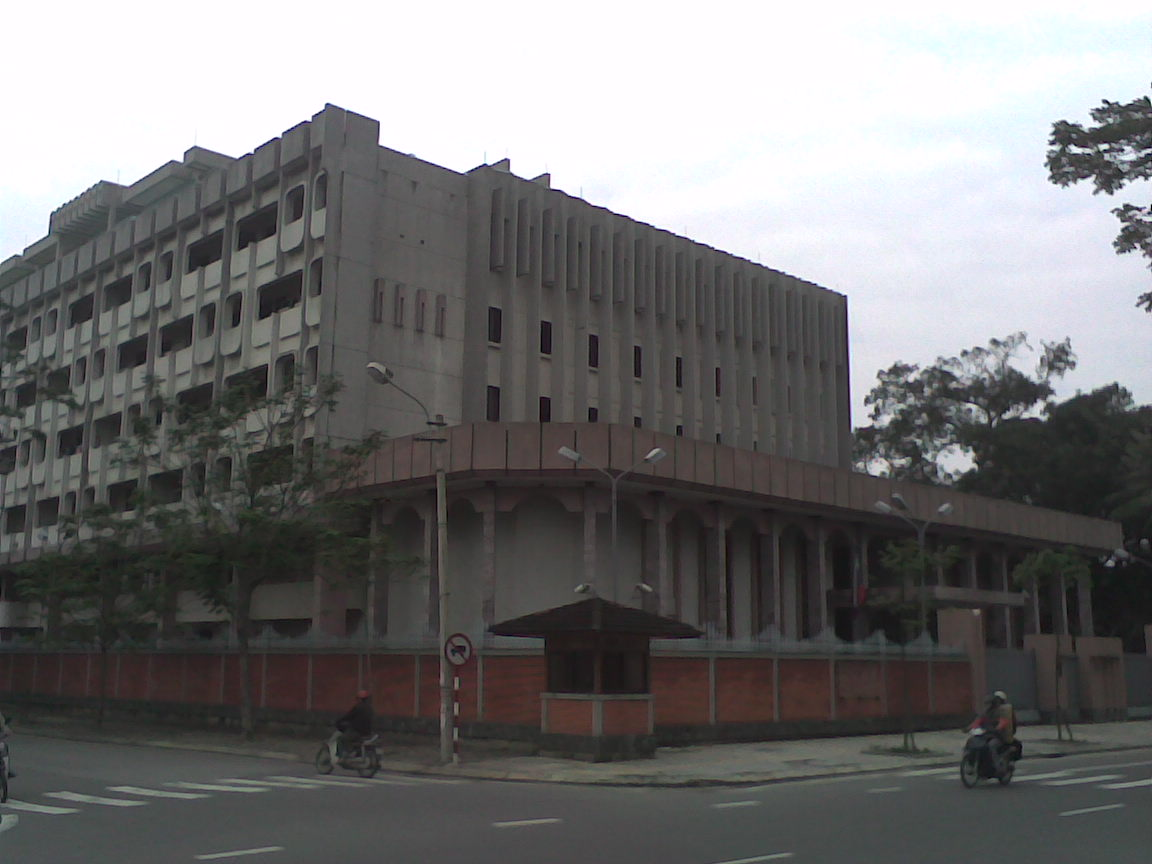
Consulate General in Da Nang

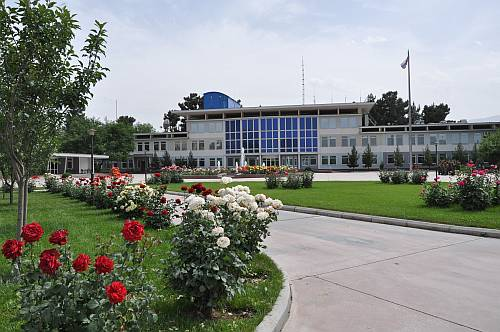
Embassy in Kabul

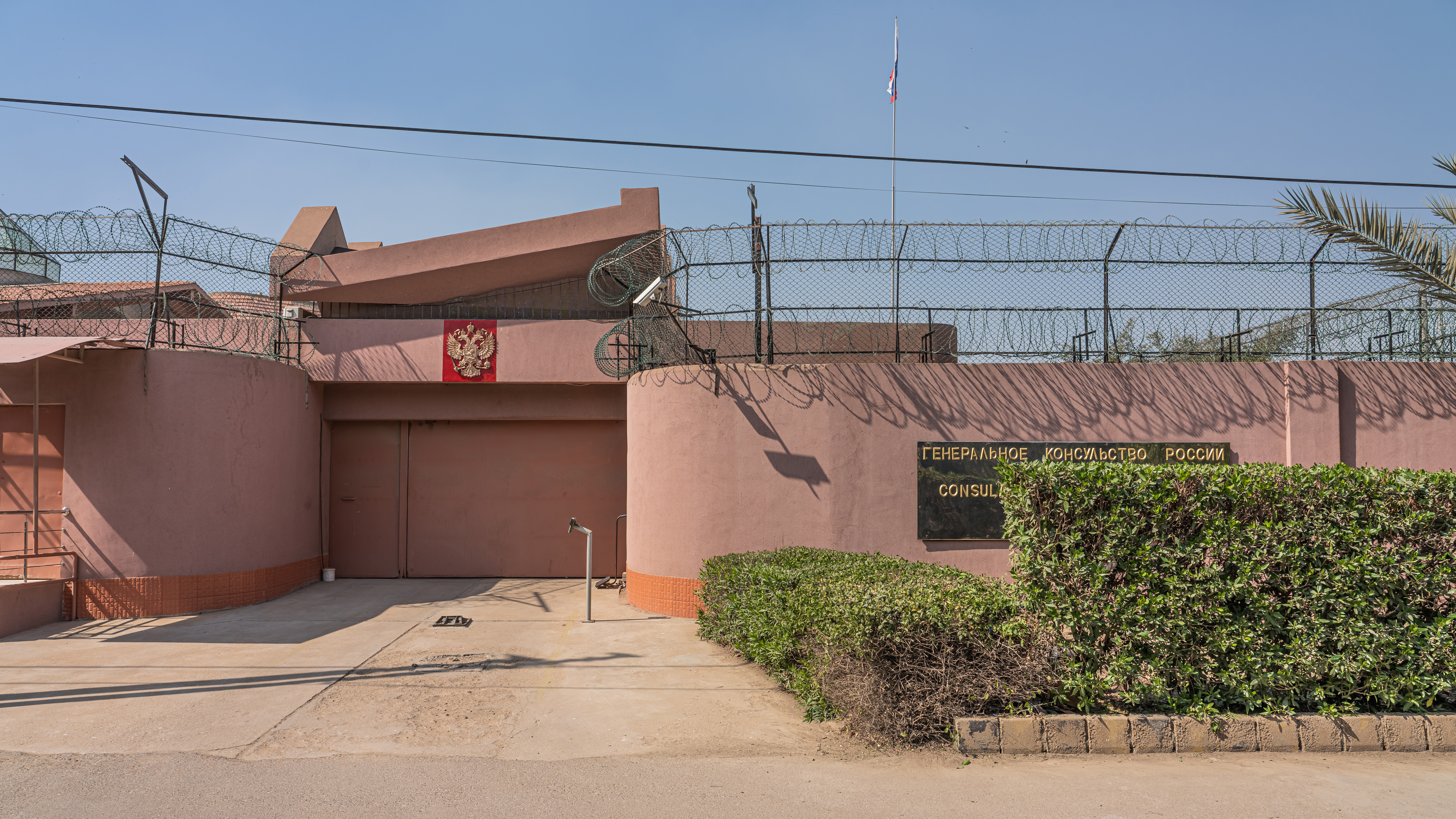
Consulate General in Karachi

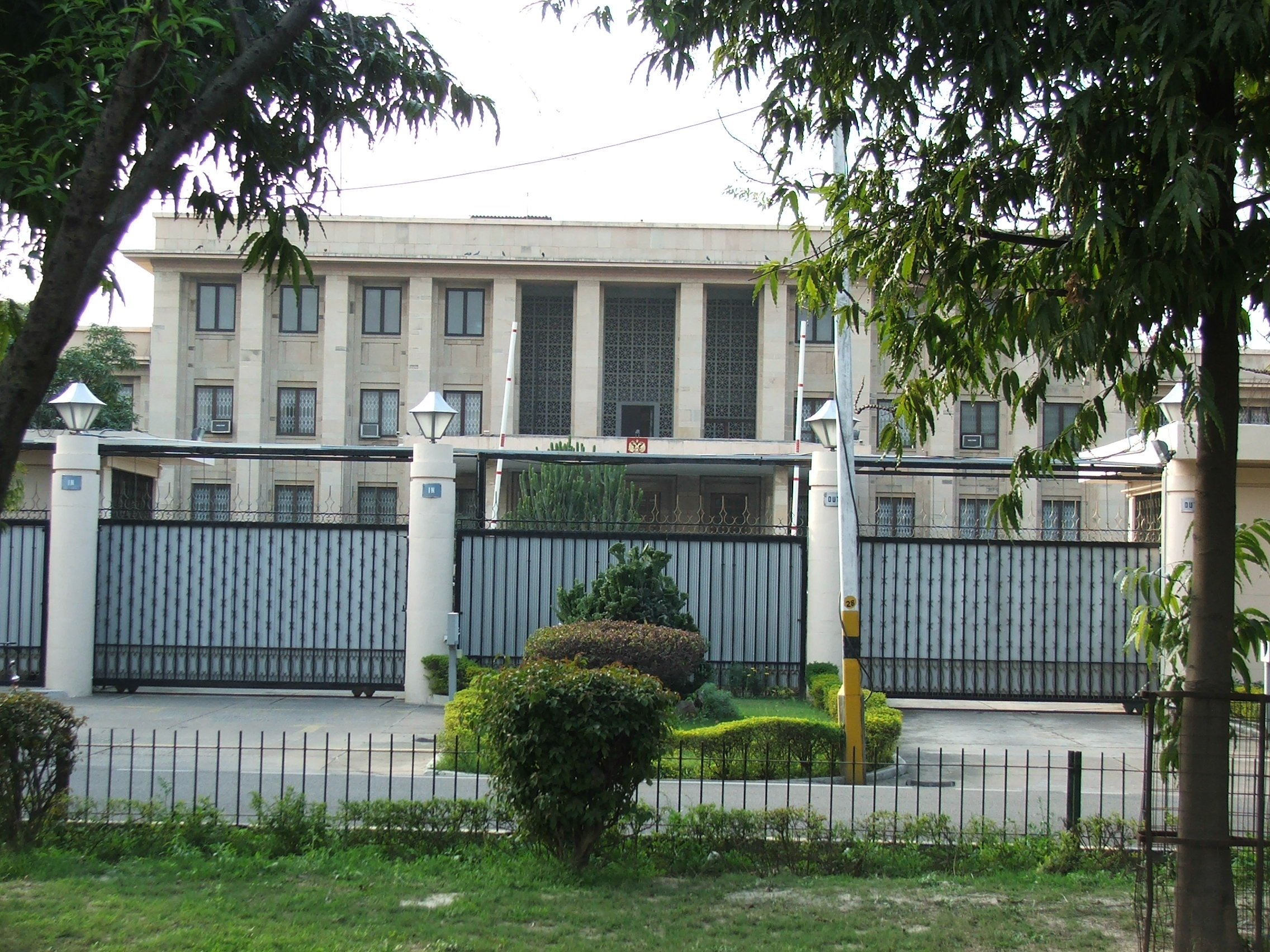
Embassy in New Delhi

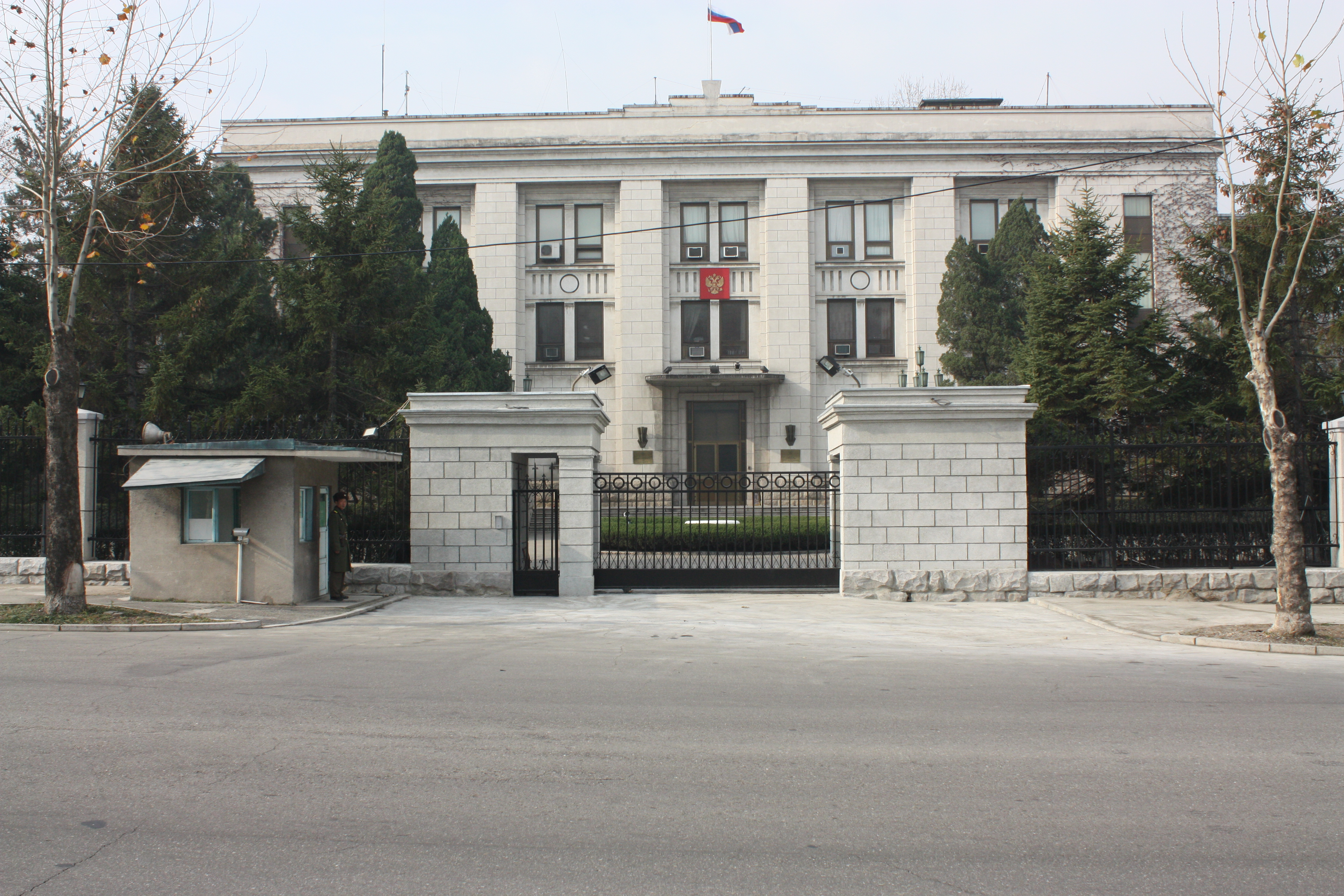
Embassy in Pyongyang

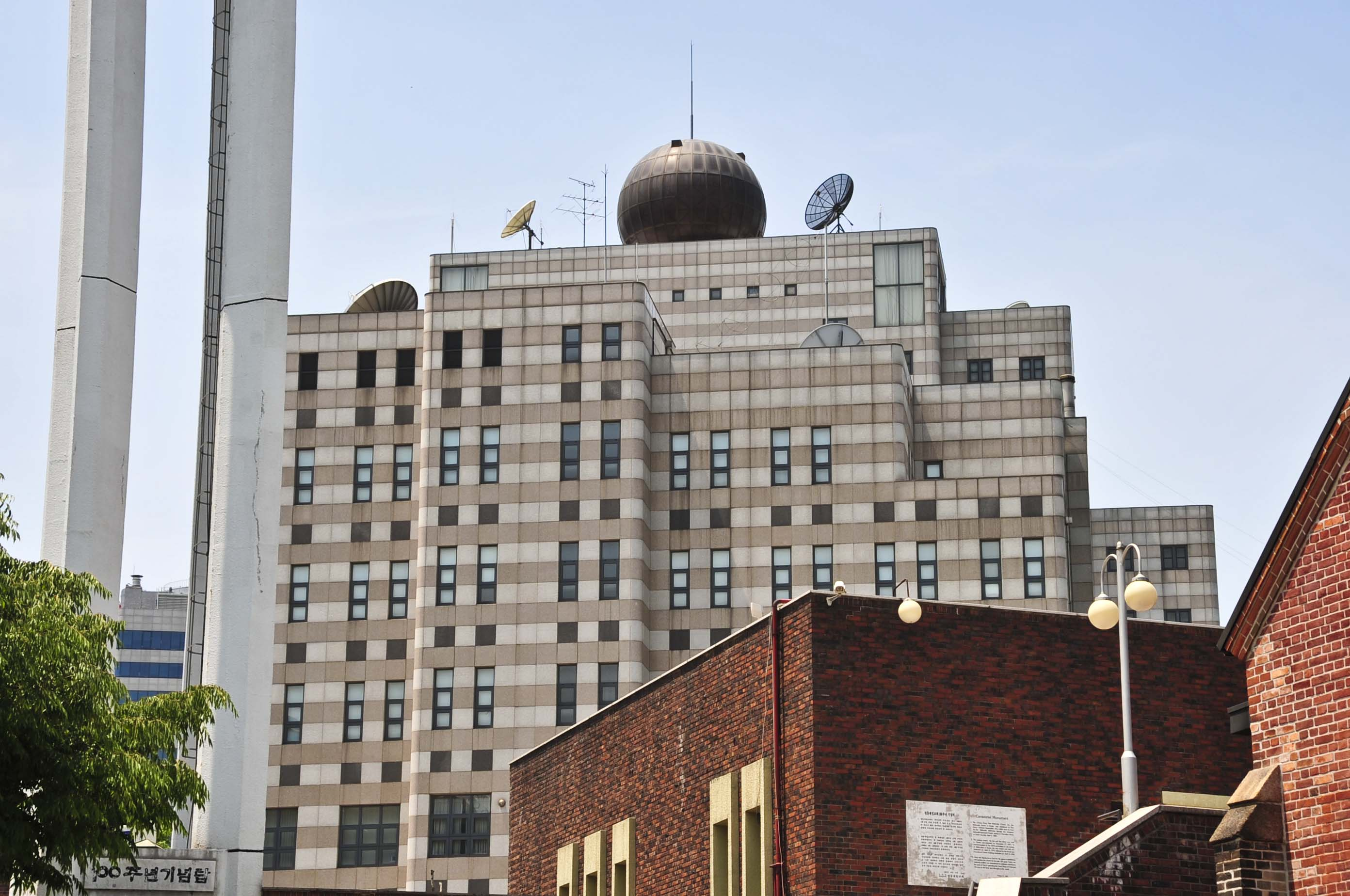
Embassy in Seoul

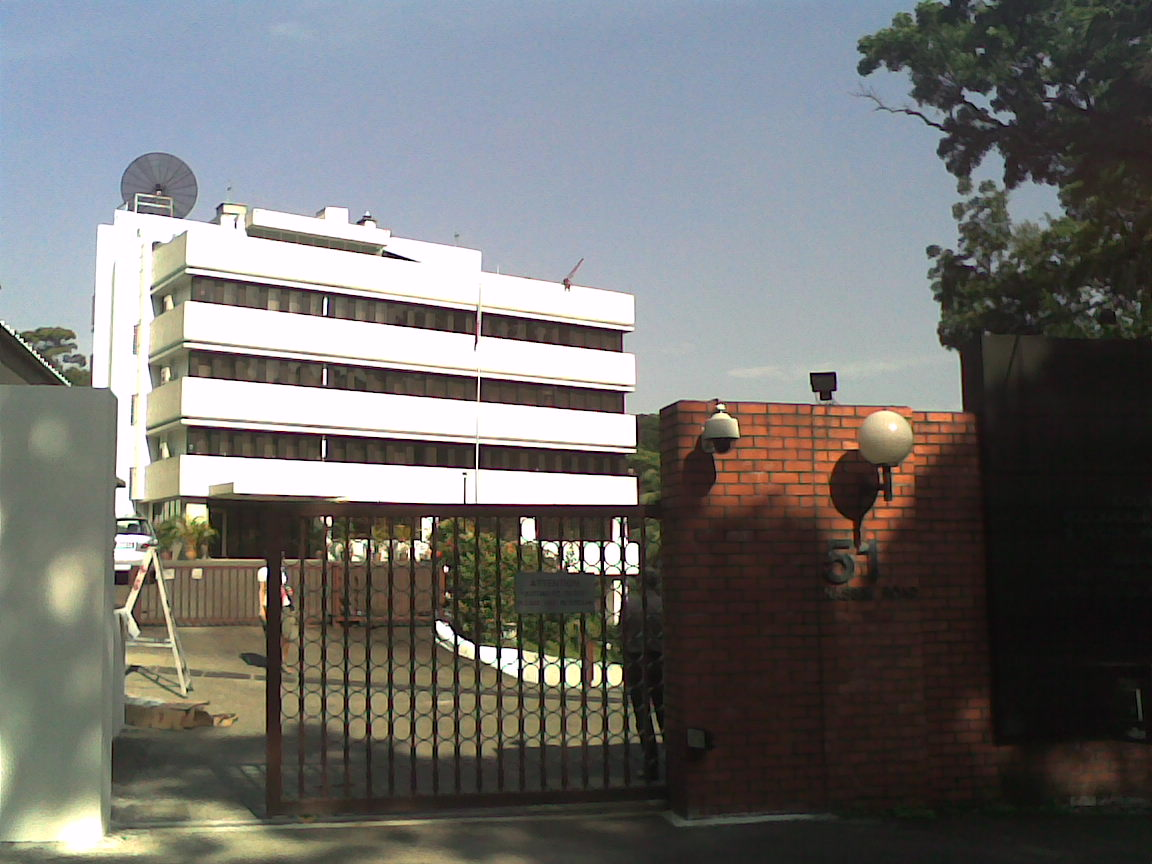
Embassy in Singapore

Embassy in Tehran

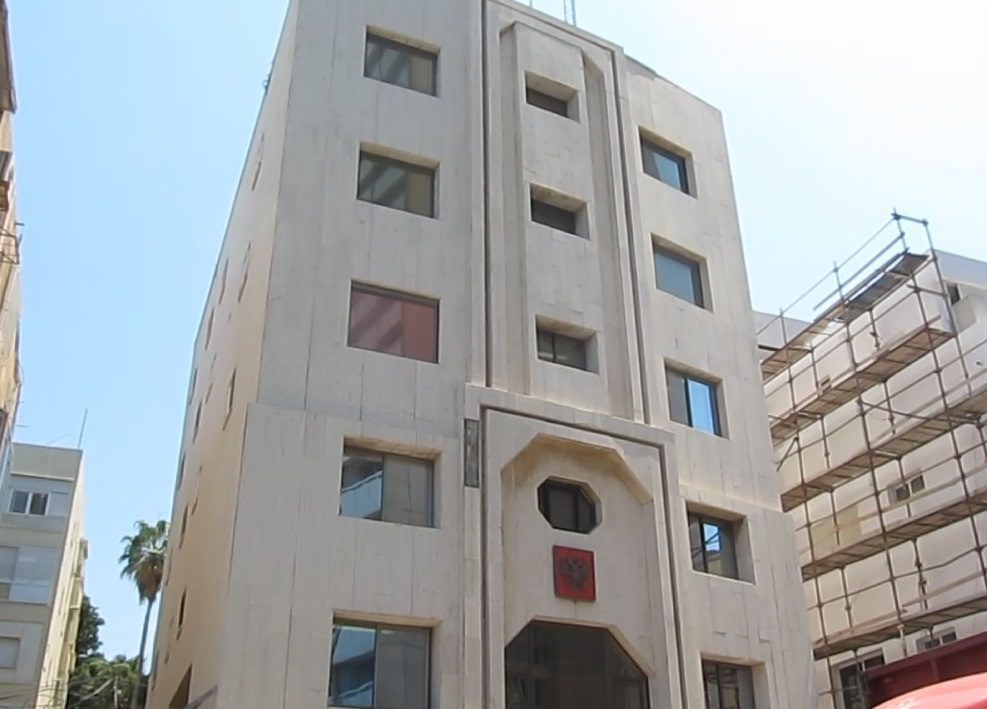
Embassy in Tel Aviv

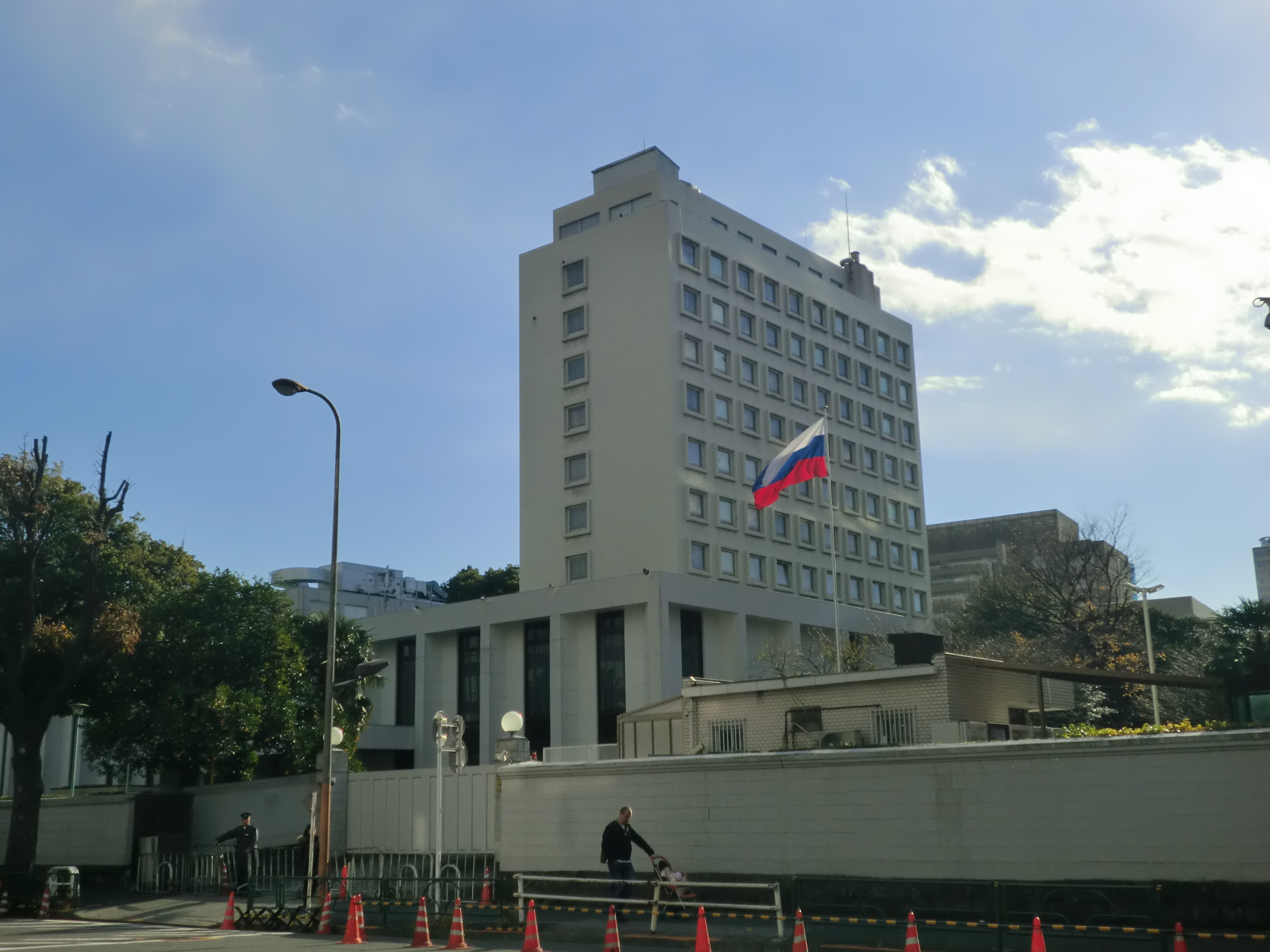
Embassy in Tokyo

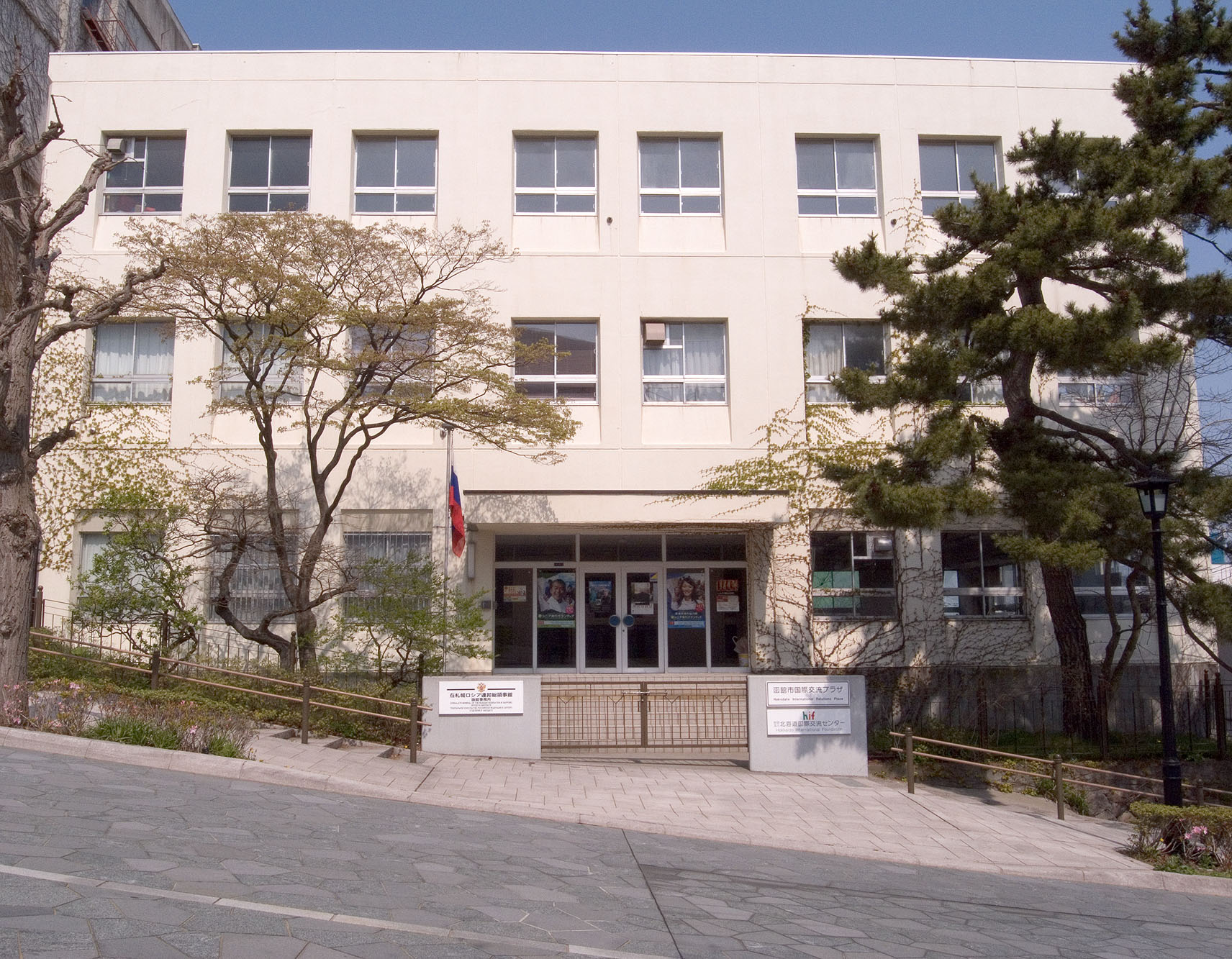
Consular Office in Hakodate

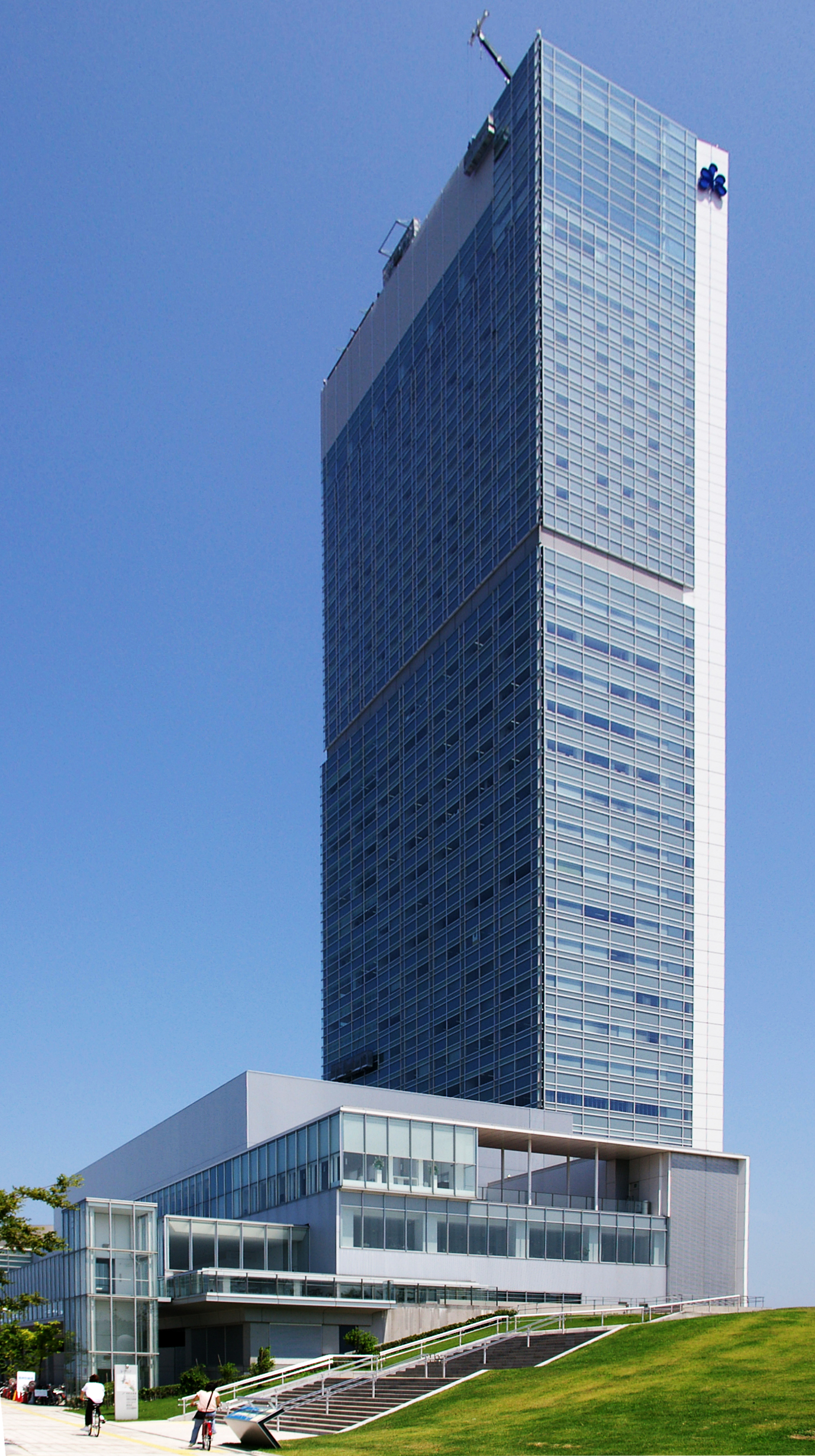
Consulate General in Niigata

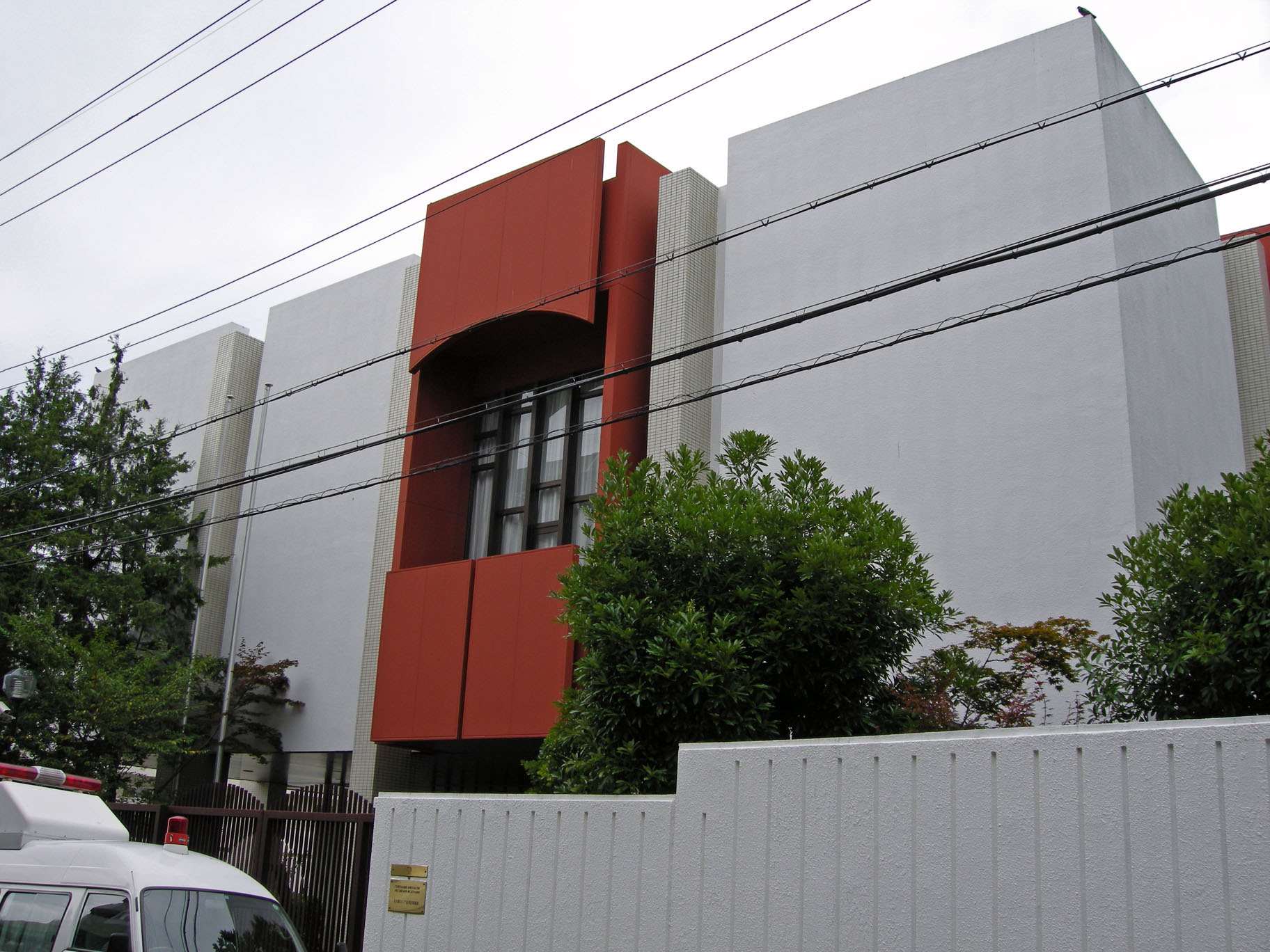
Consulate General in Osaka

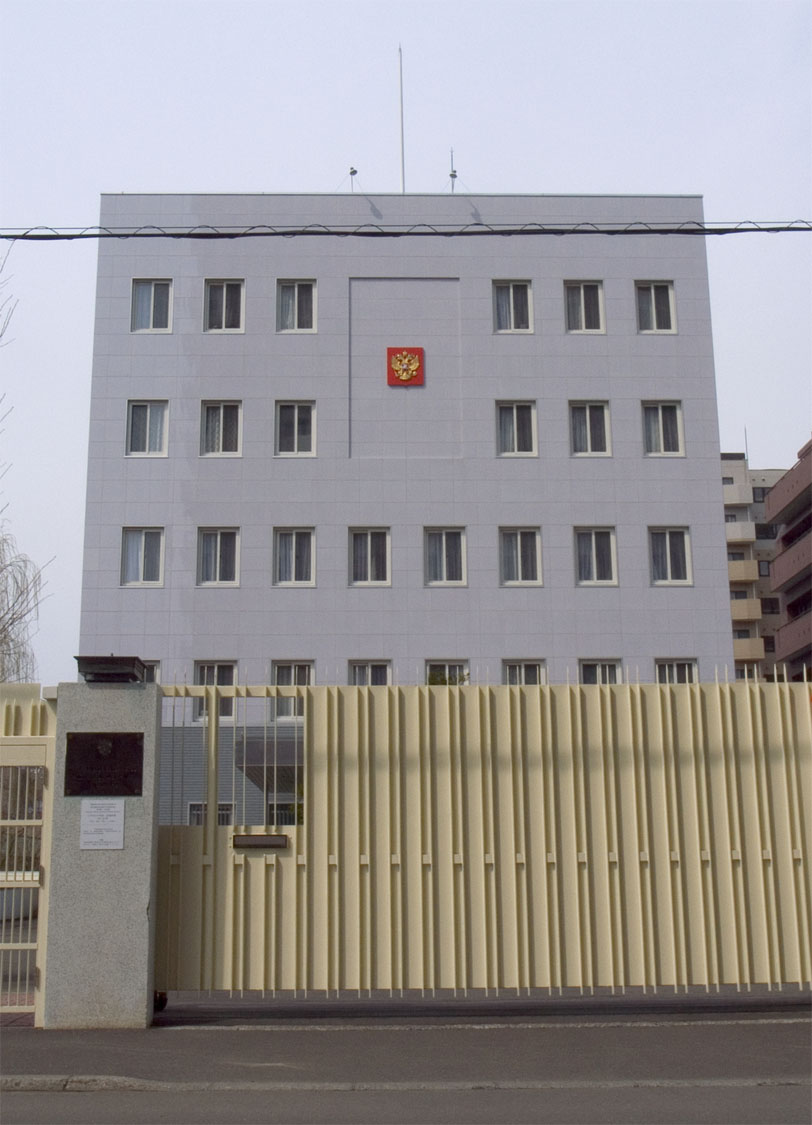
Consulate General in Sapporo

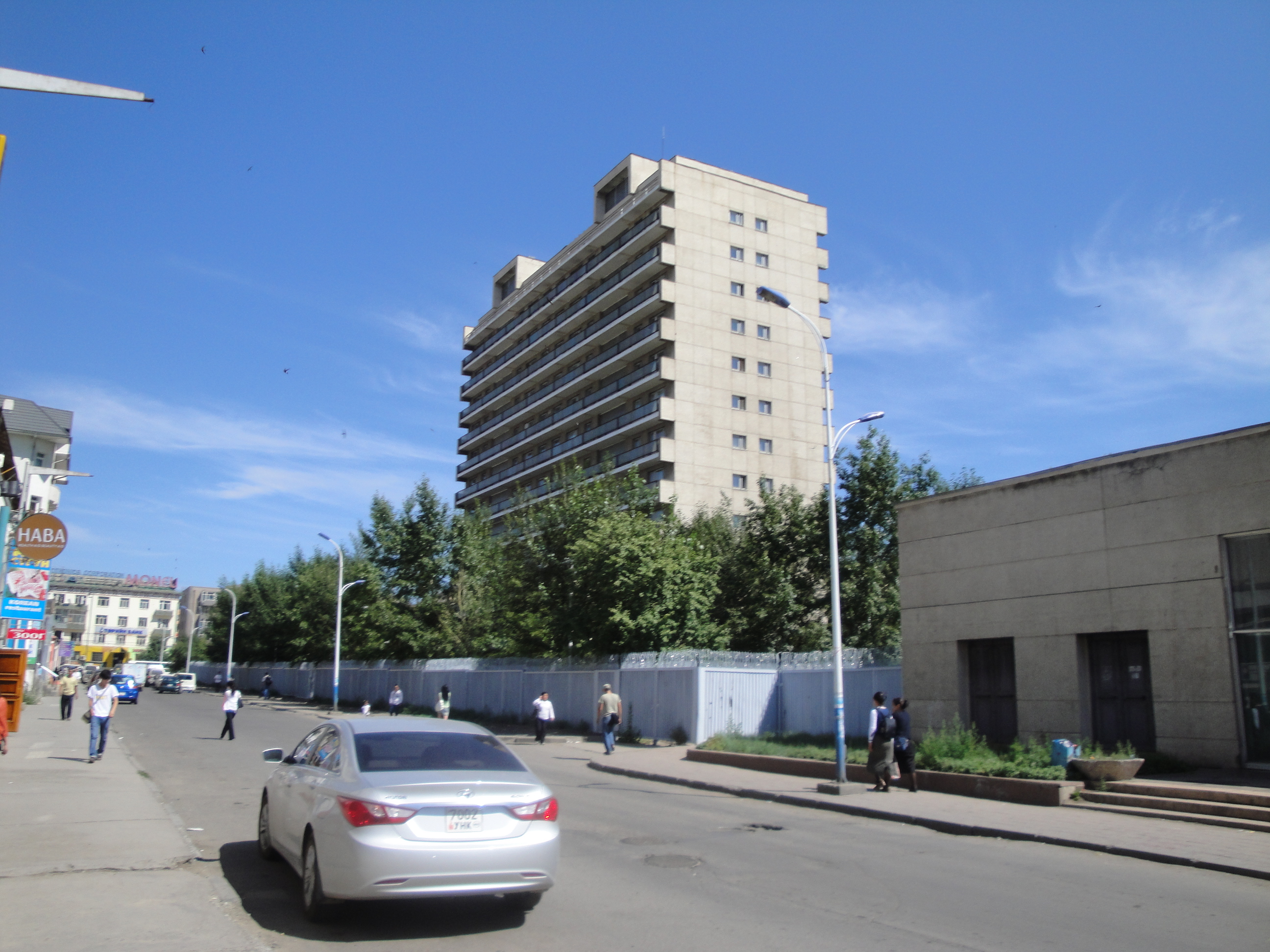
Embassy in Ulaanbaatar

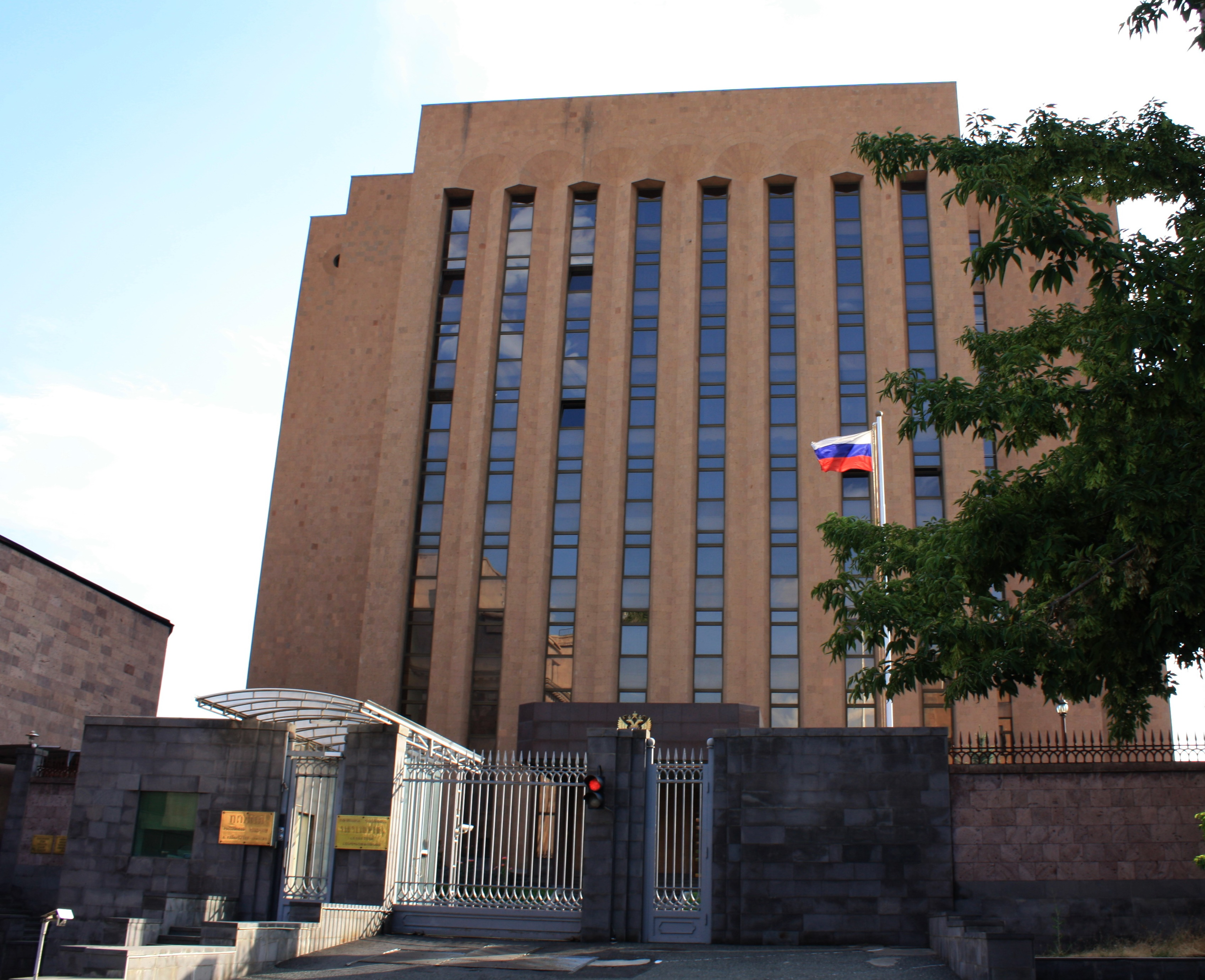
Embassy in Yerevan

=== Europe ===
Host country	Host city	Mission	Concurrent accreditation	Ref.
Albania	Tirana	Embassy		
Austria	Vienna	Embassy		
Austria	Salzburg	Consulate-General		
Belarus	Minsk	Embassy		
Belarus	Brest	Consulate-General		
Belarus	Grodno	Consulate-General		
Belgium	Brussels	Embassy		
Belgium	Antwerp	Consulate-General		
Bosnia and Herzegovina	Sarajevo	Embassy		
Bulgaria	Sofia	Embassy		
Czechia	Prague	Embassy		
Czechia	Brno	Consulate General		
Czechia	Karlovy Vary	Consulate-General		
Croatia	Zagreb	Embassy		
Cyprus	Nicosia	Embassy		
Denmark	Copenhagen	Embassy		
Estonia	Tallinn	Embassy		
Finland	Helsinki	Embassy		
Finland	Mariehamn	Consulate		
France	Paris	Embassy	Countries: Monaco	
France	Marseille	Consulate-General	Countries: Monaco	
France	Strasbourg	Consulate-General	Countries: Monaco	
France	Villefranche-sur-Mer	Consular Agency	Countries: Monaco	
Germany	Berlin	Embassy		
Greece	Athens	Embassy		
Greece	Thessaloniki	Consulate General		
Holy See	Rome (Note: The Russian Embassy to the Holy See is located outside Vatican territory.)	Embassy	Countries: Sovereign Military Order of Malta	
Hungary	Budapest	Embassy		
Hungary	Debrecen	Consulate-General		
Iceland	Reykjavík	Embassy		
Ireland	Dublin	Embassy		
Italy	Rome	Embassy	Countries: San Marino	
Italy	Genoa	Consulate-General	Countries: San Marino	
Italy	Milan	Consulate-General	Countries: San Marino	
Italy	Palermo	Consulate-General	Countries: San Marino	
Kosovo	Pristina	Liaison office		
Latvia	Riga	Embassy		
Lithuania	Vilnius	Embassy		
Luxembourg	Luxembourg City	Embassy		
Malta	Valletta	Embassy		
Moldova	Chișinău	Embassy		
Moldova	Tiraspol	Consulate General	de facto consulate to Transnistria	
Montenegro	Podgorica	Embassy		
Netherlands	The Hague	Embassy		
North Macedonia	Skopje	Embassy		
Norway	Oslo	Embassy		
Norway	Barentsburg	Consulate-General		
Norway	Kirkenes	Consulate-General		
Poland	Warsaw	Embassy		
Portugal	Lisbon	Embassy		
Romania	Bucharest	Embassy		
Serbia	Belgrade	Embassy		
Slovakia	Bratislava	Embassy		
Slovenia	Ljubljana	Embassy		
Spain	Madrid	Embassy	Countries: Andorra	
Spain	Barcelona	Consulate-General	Countries: Andorra	
Sweden	Stockholm	Embassy		
Switzerland	Bern	Embassy	Countries: Liechtenstein	
Switzerland	Geneva	Consulate-General	Countries: Liechtenstein	
United Kingdom	London	Embassy		
United Kingdom	Edinburgh	Consulate-General		

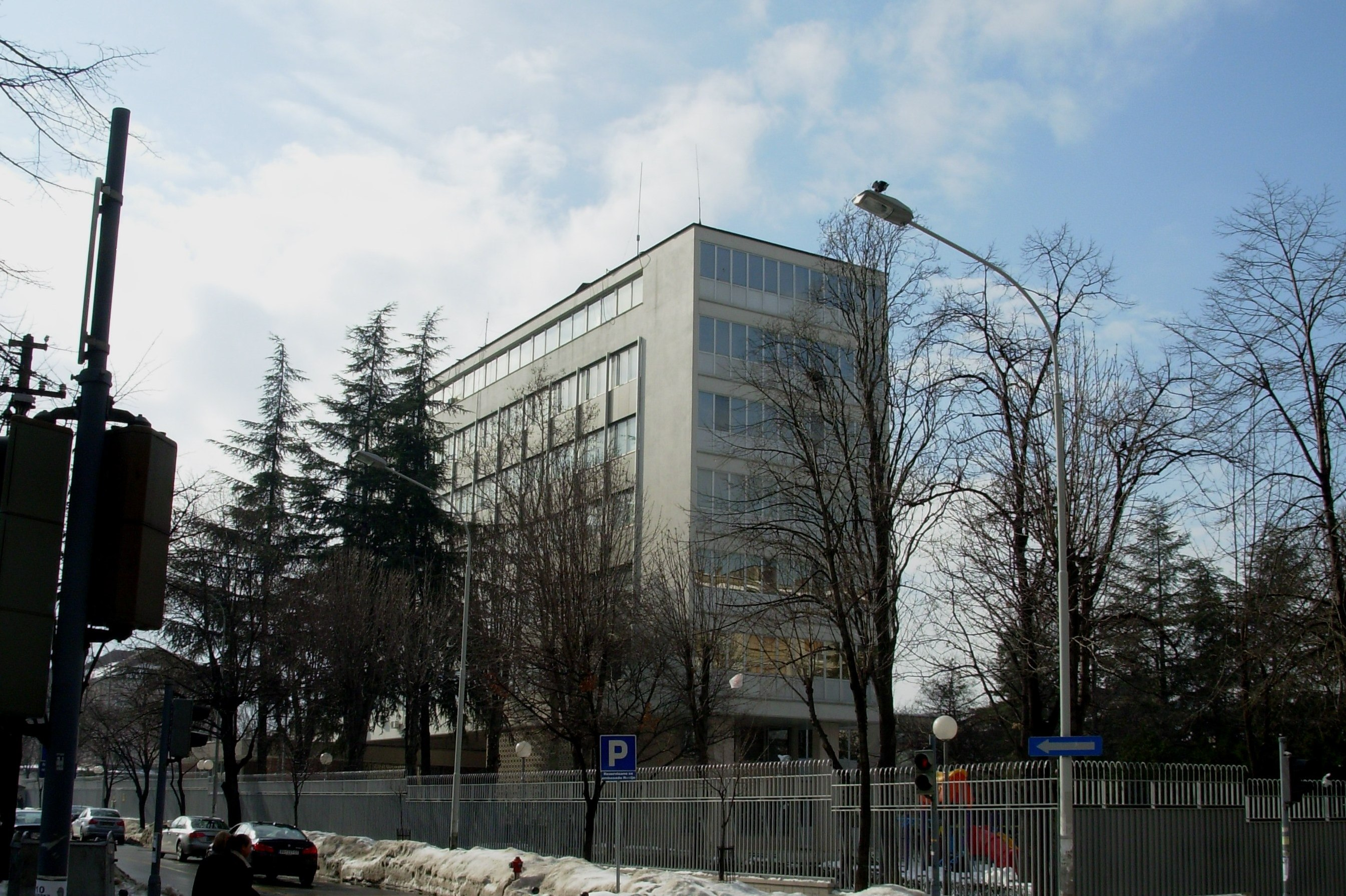
Embassy in Belgrade

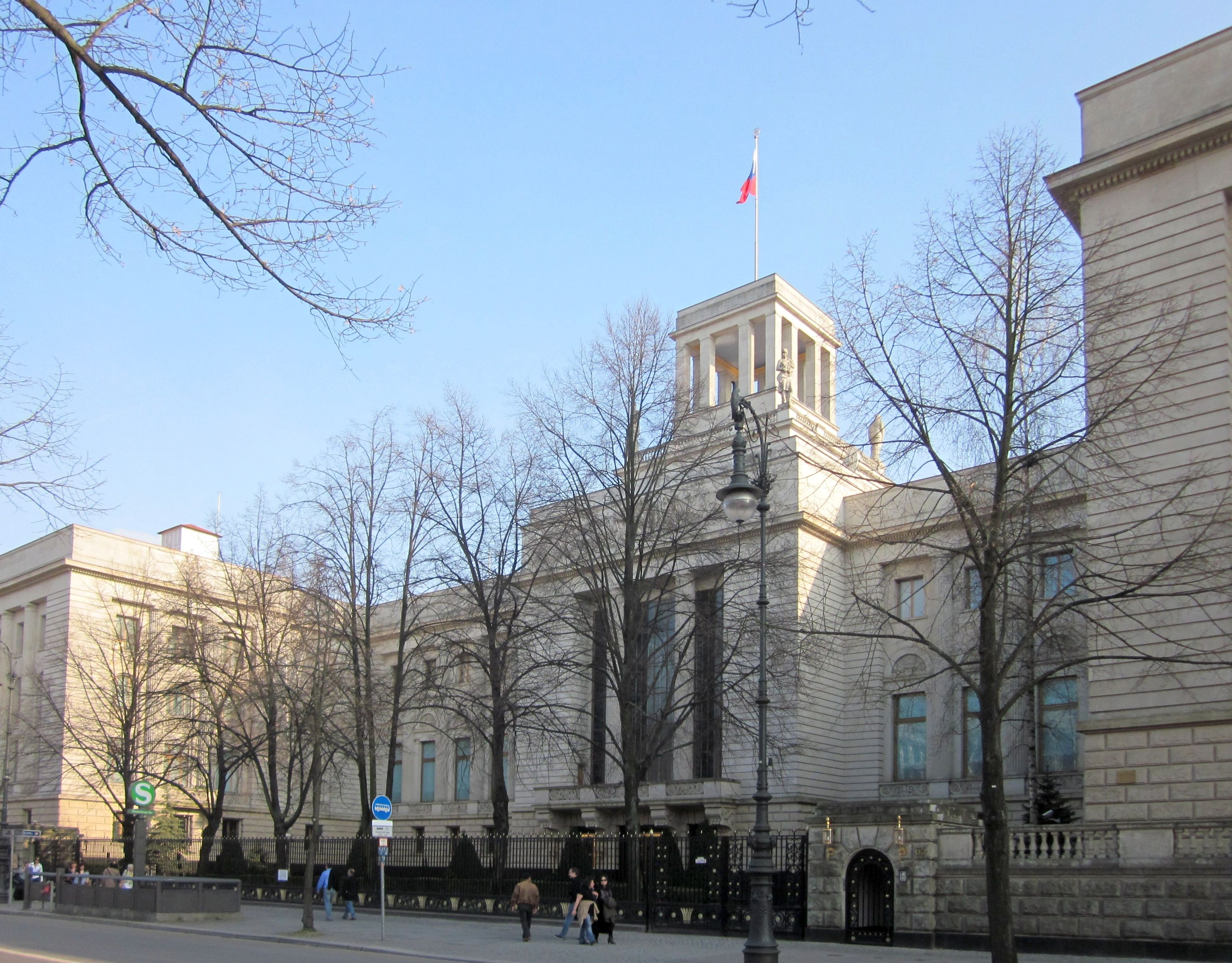
Embassy in Berlin

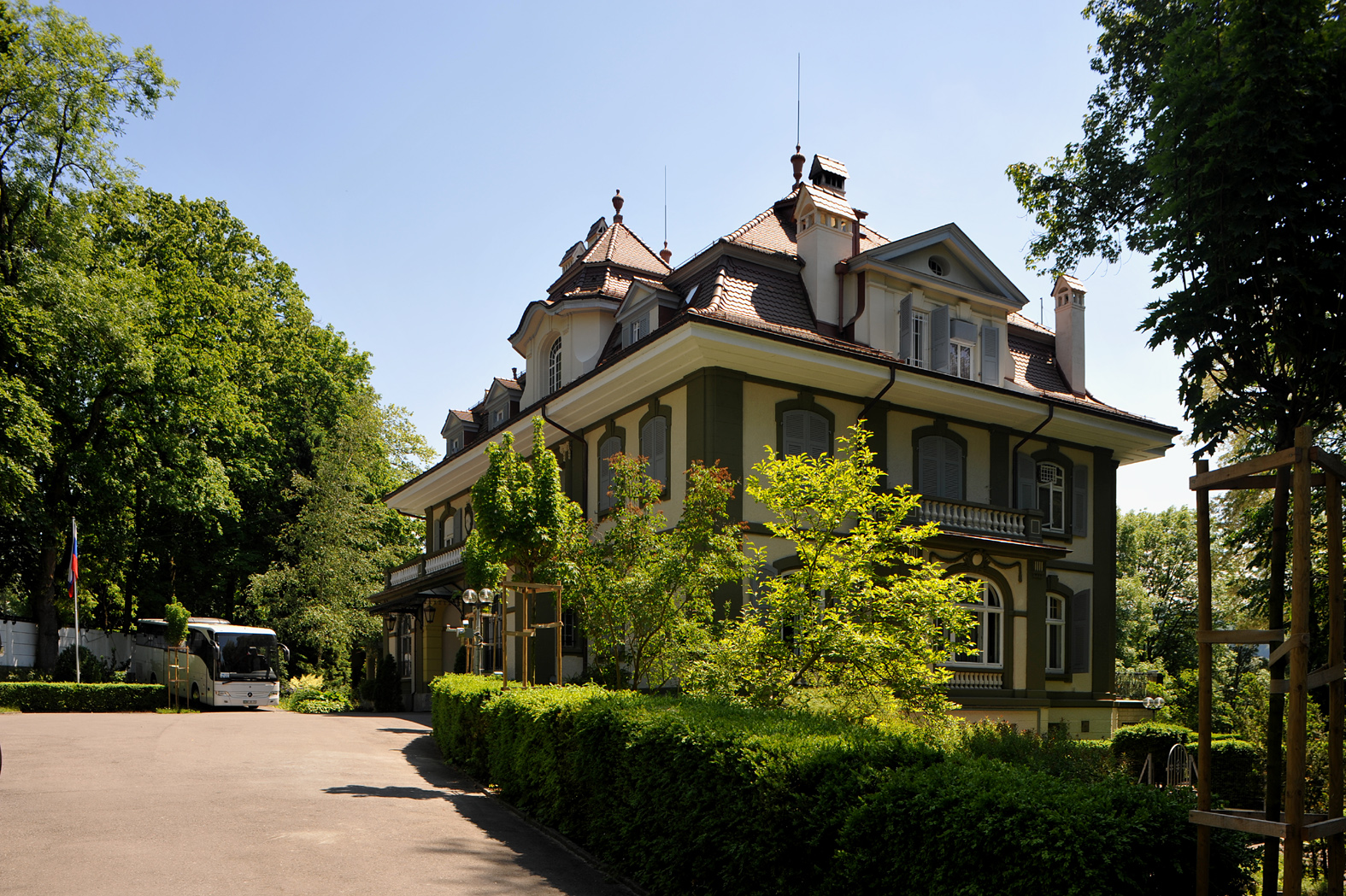
Embassy in Bern

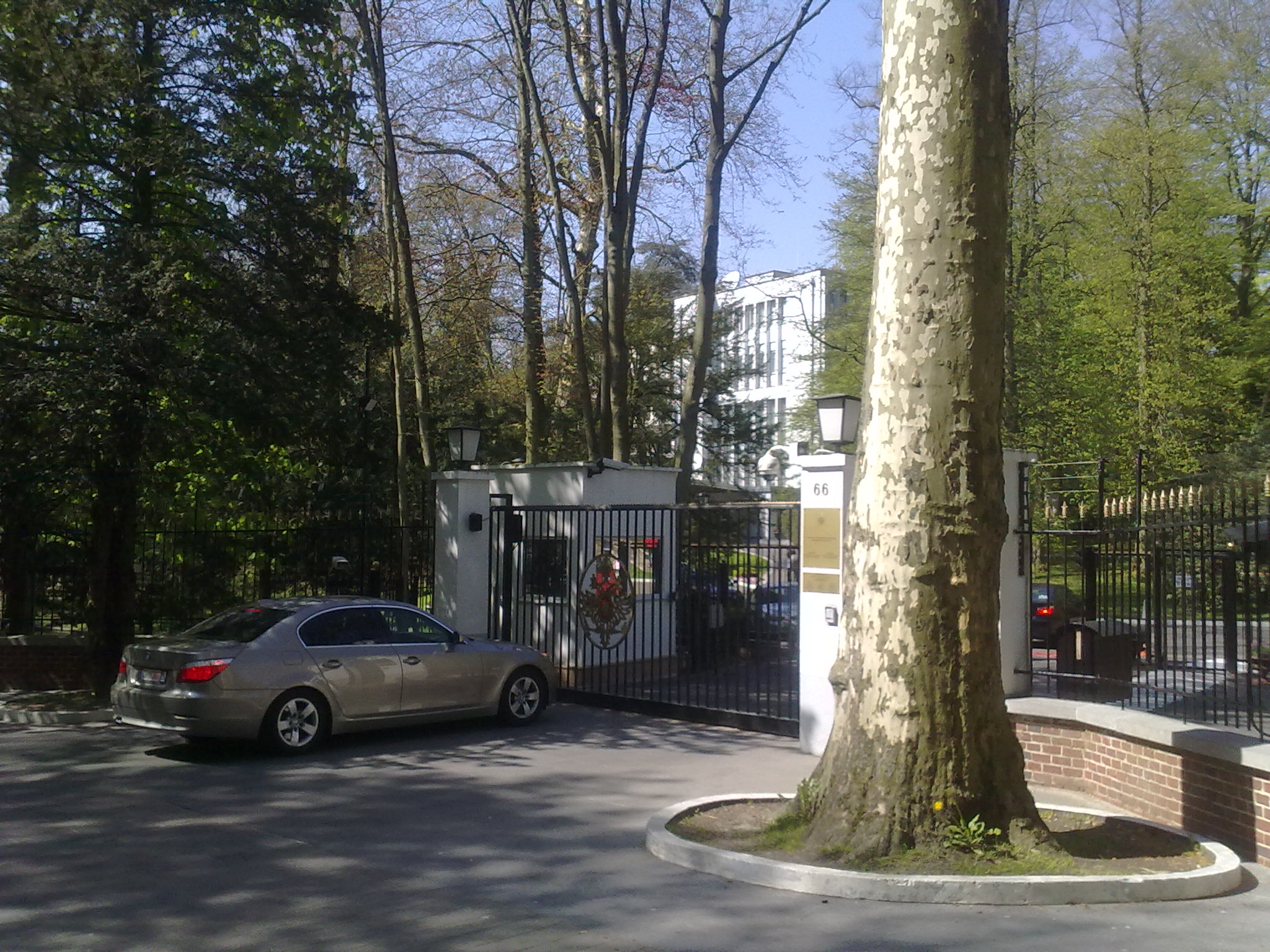
Embassy in Brussels

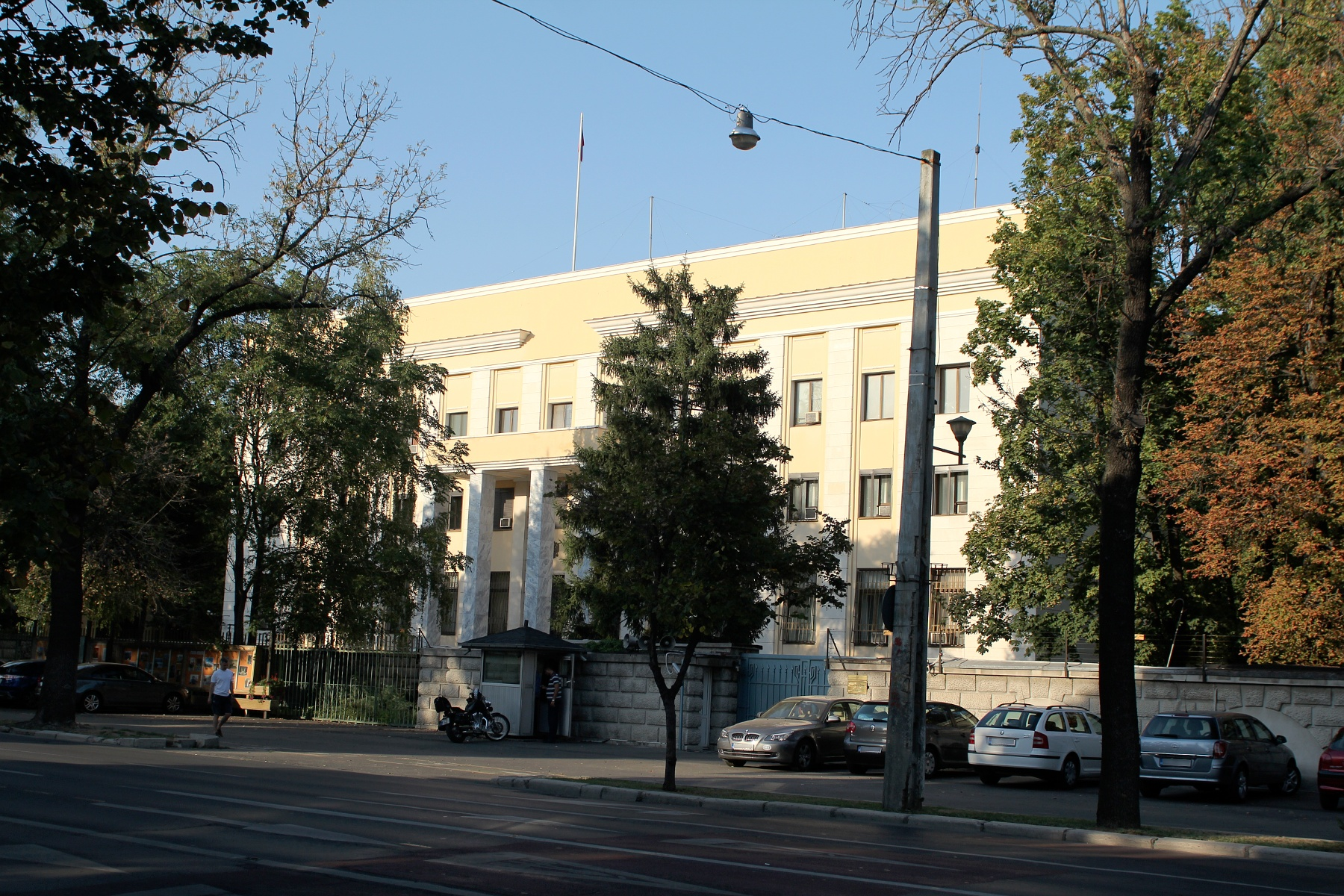
Embassy in Bucharest

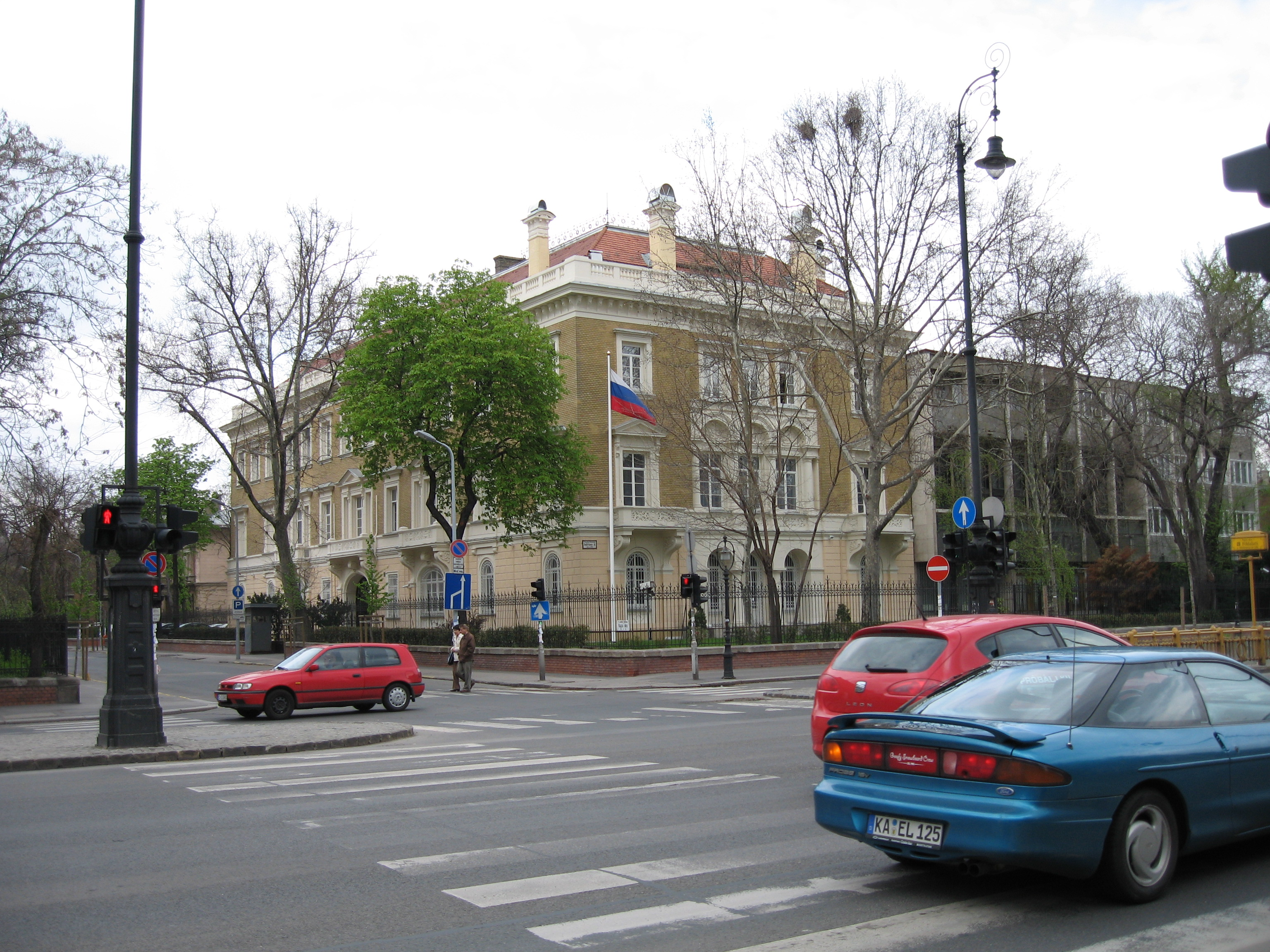
Embassy in Budapest

Embassy in Chişinău

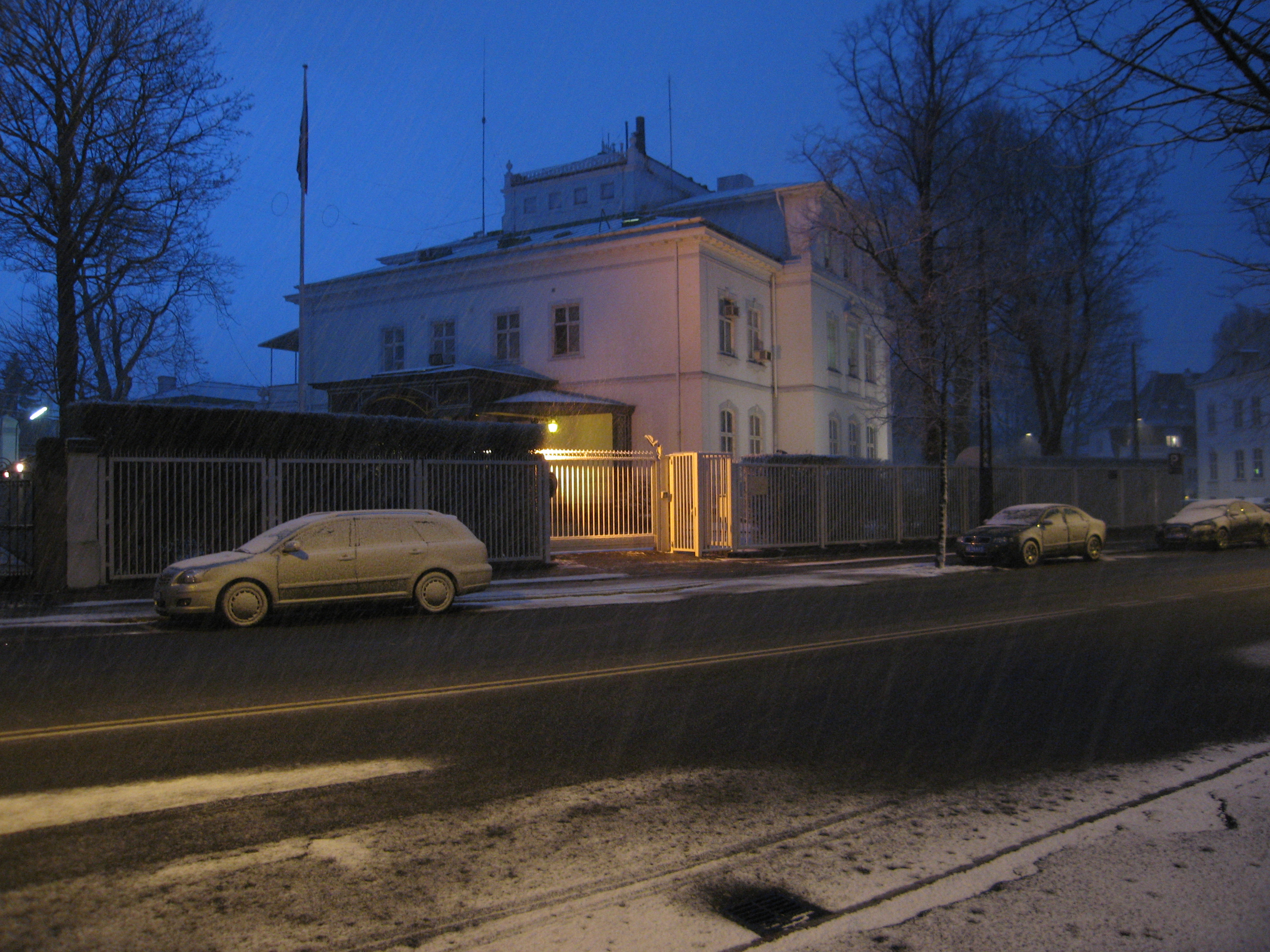
Embassy in Copenhagen

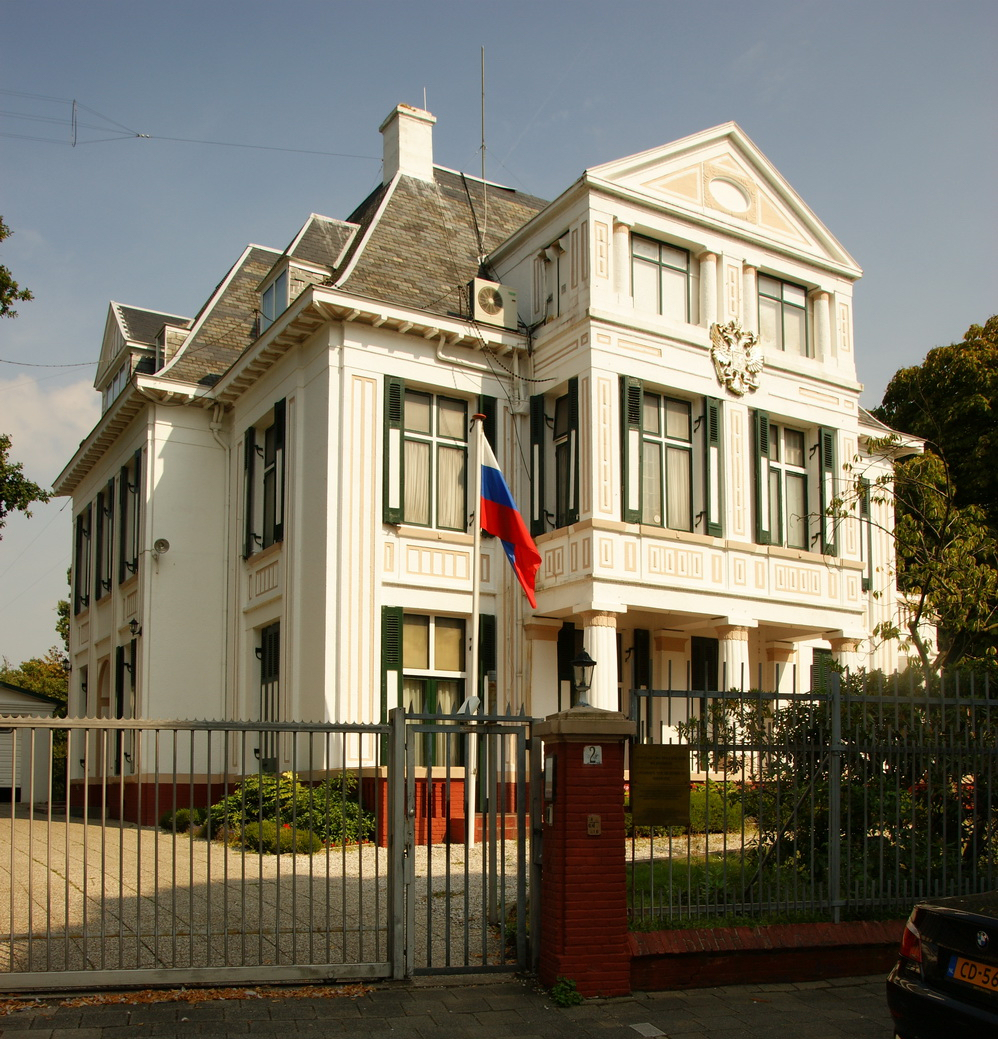
Embassy in The Hague

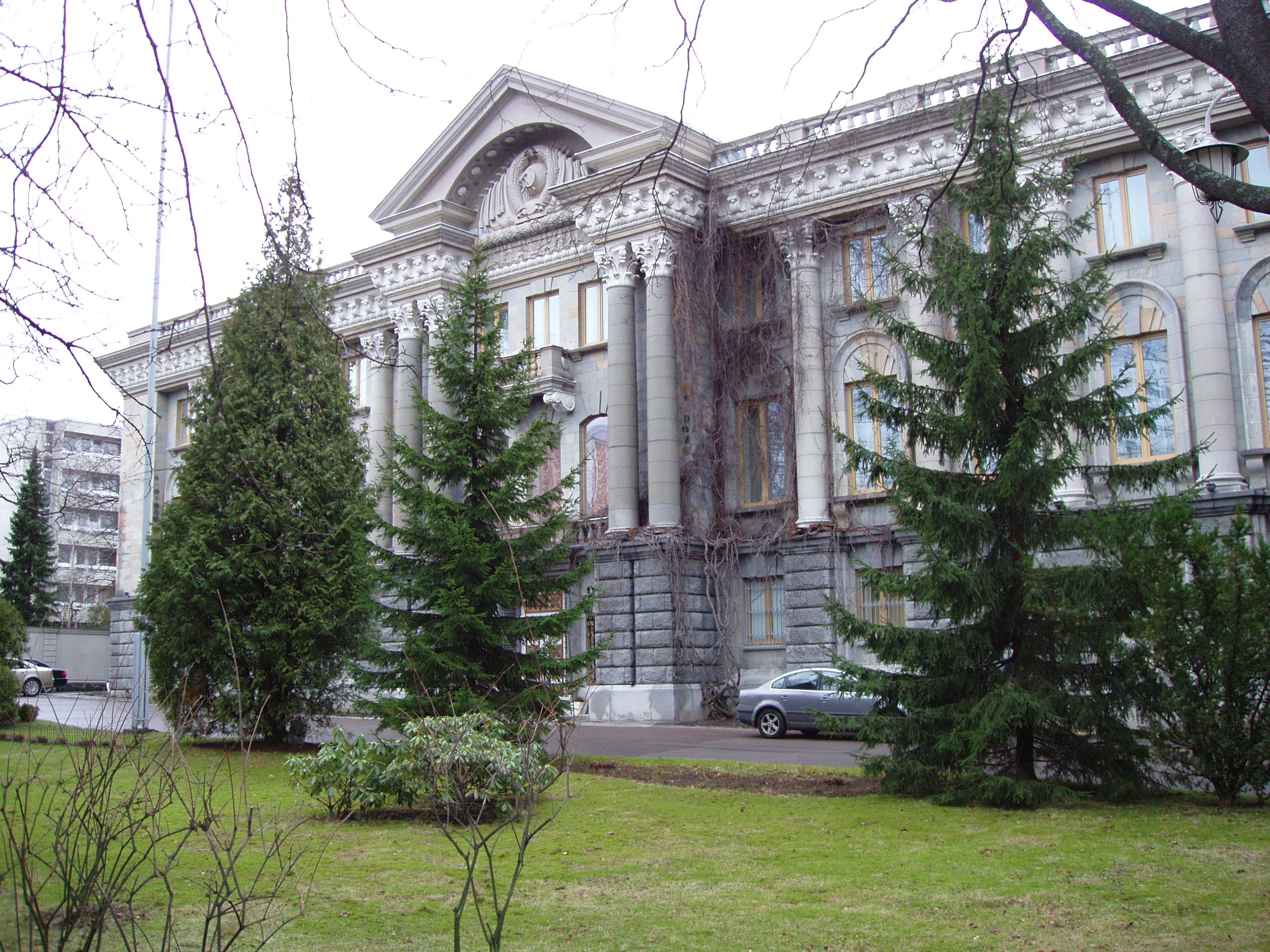
Embassy in Helsinki

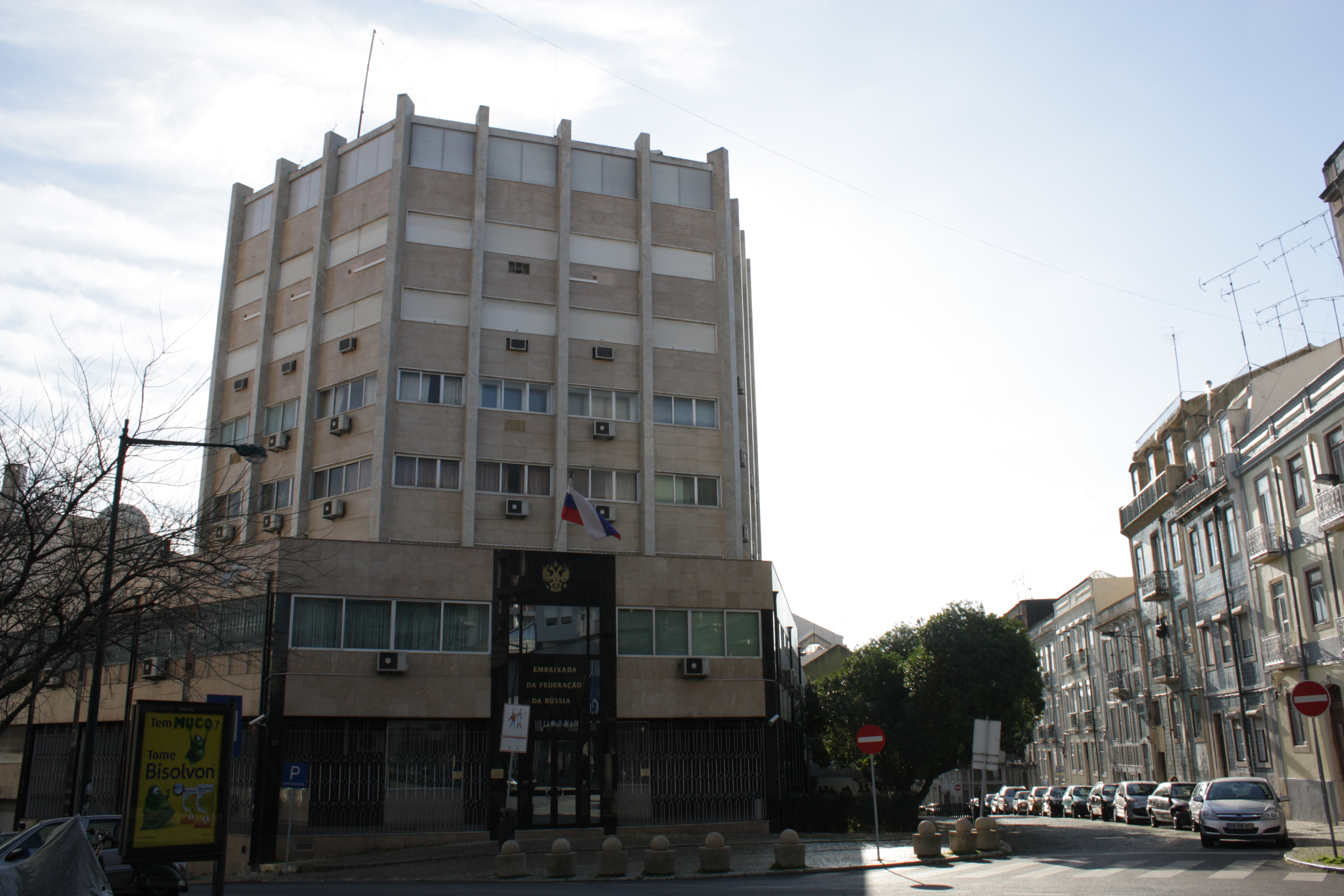
Embassy in Lisbon

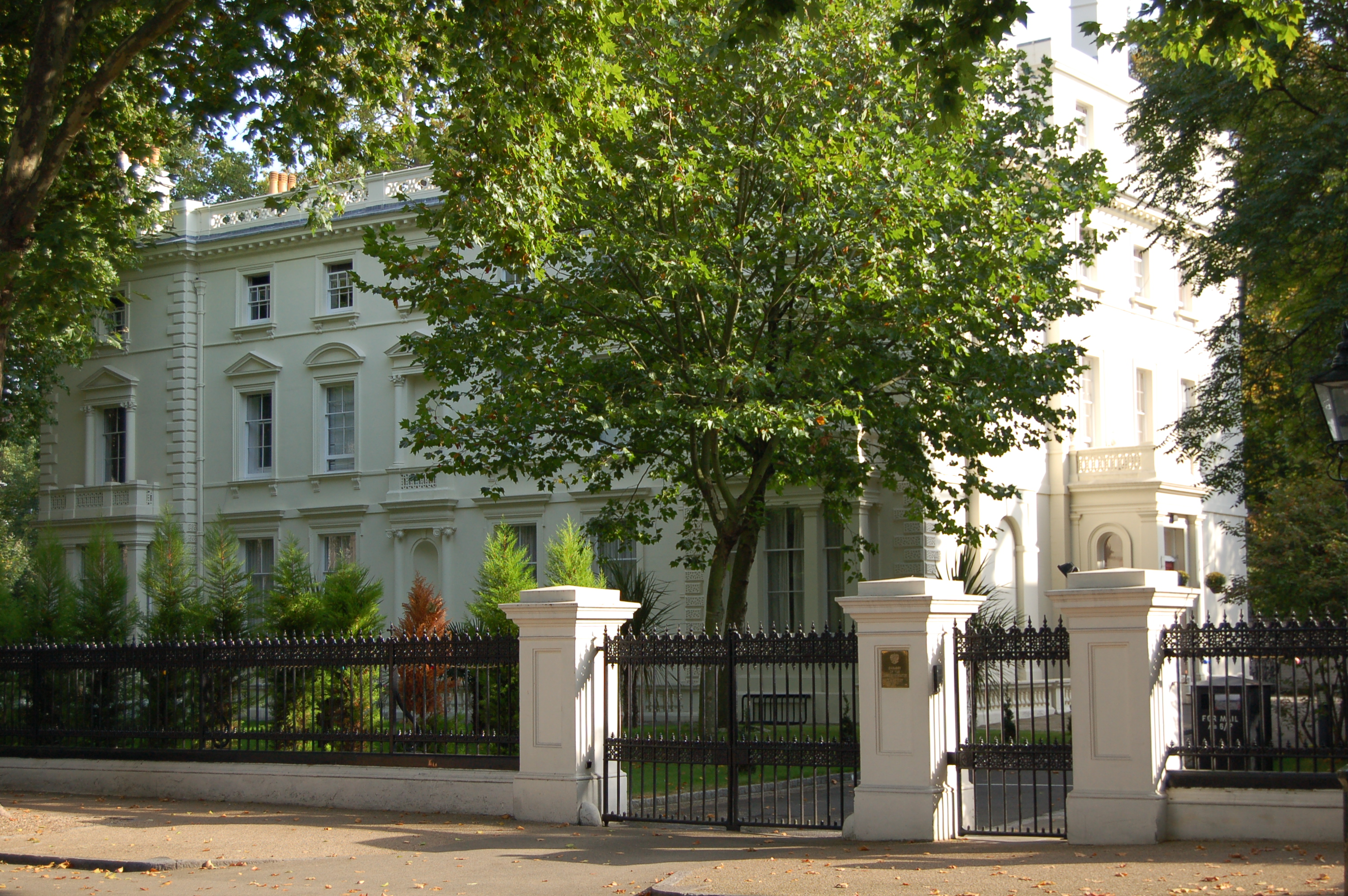
Embassy in London

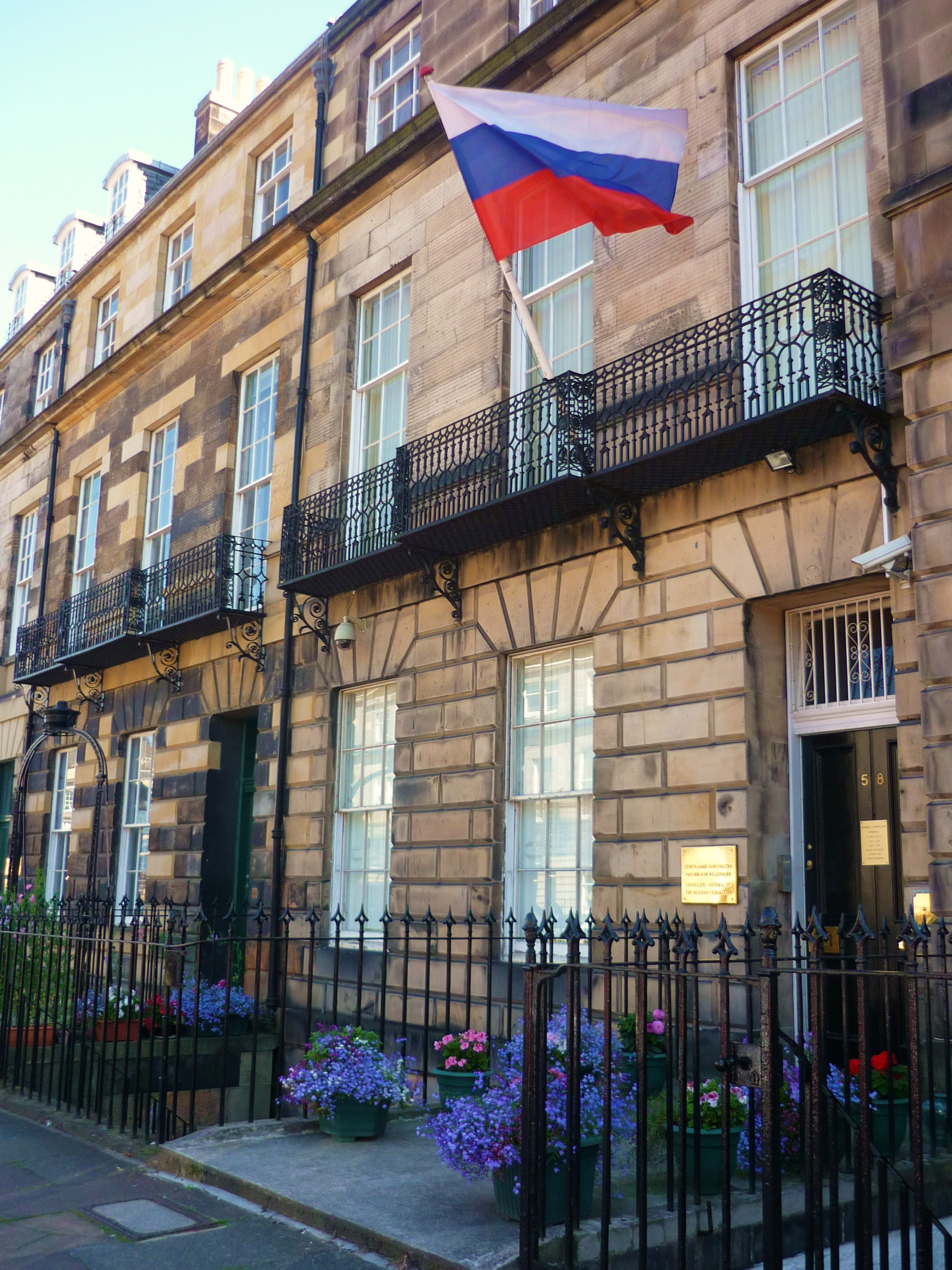
Consulate General in Edinburgh

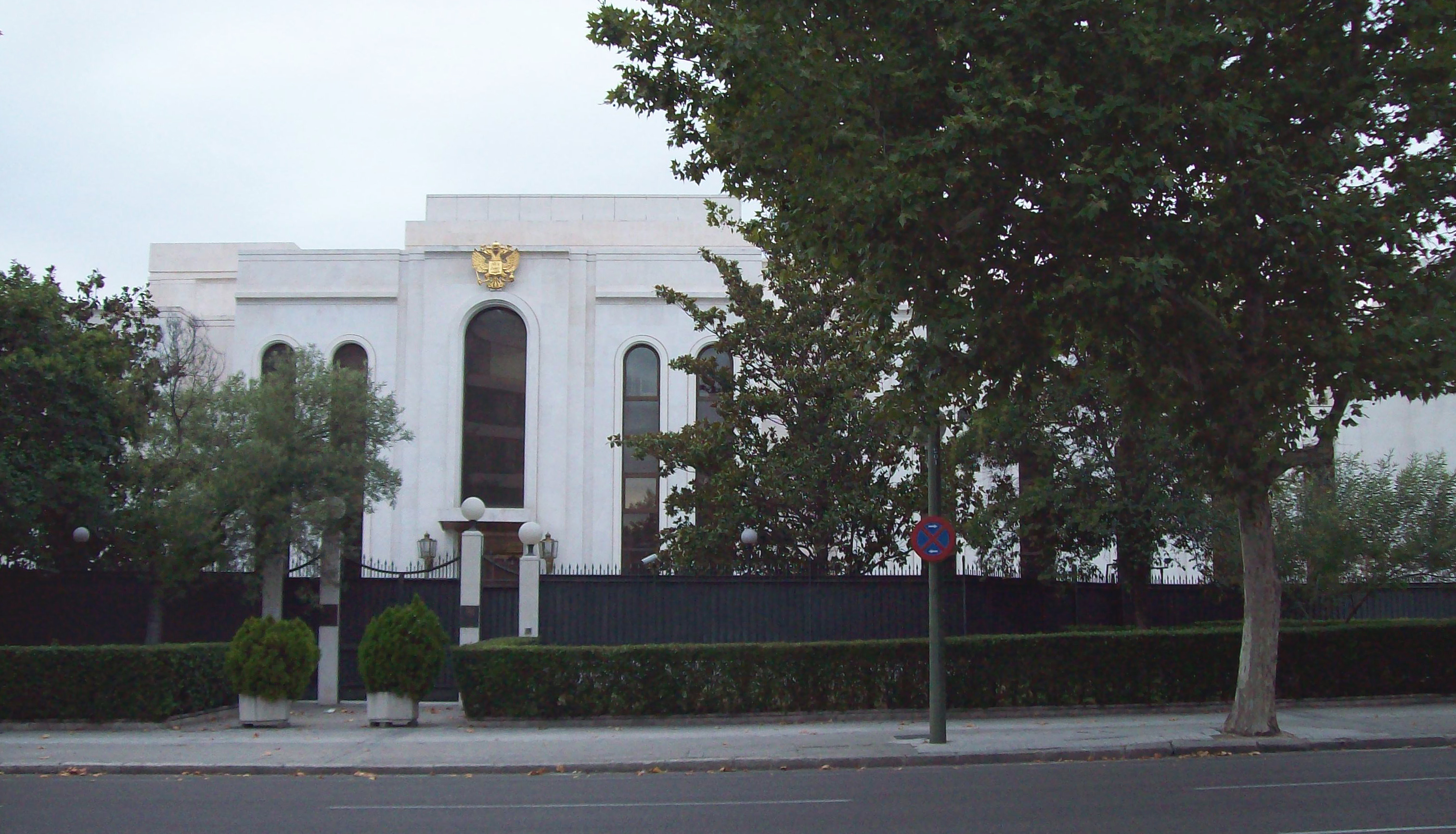
Embassy in Madrid

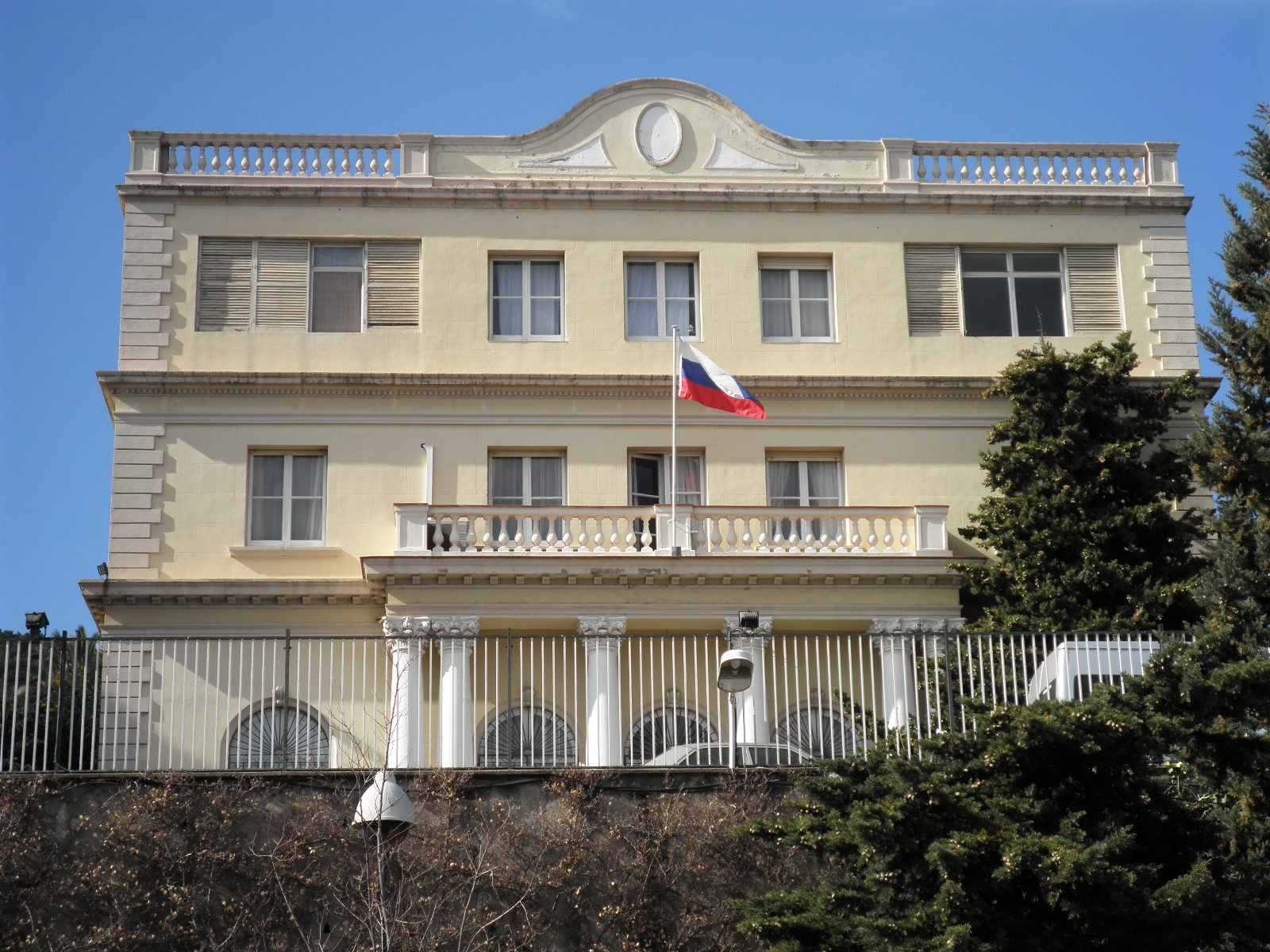
Consulate General in Barcelona

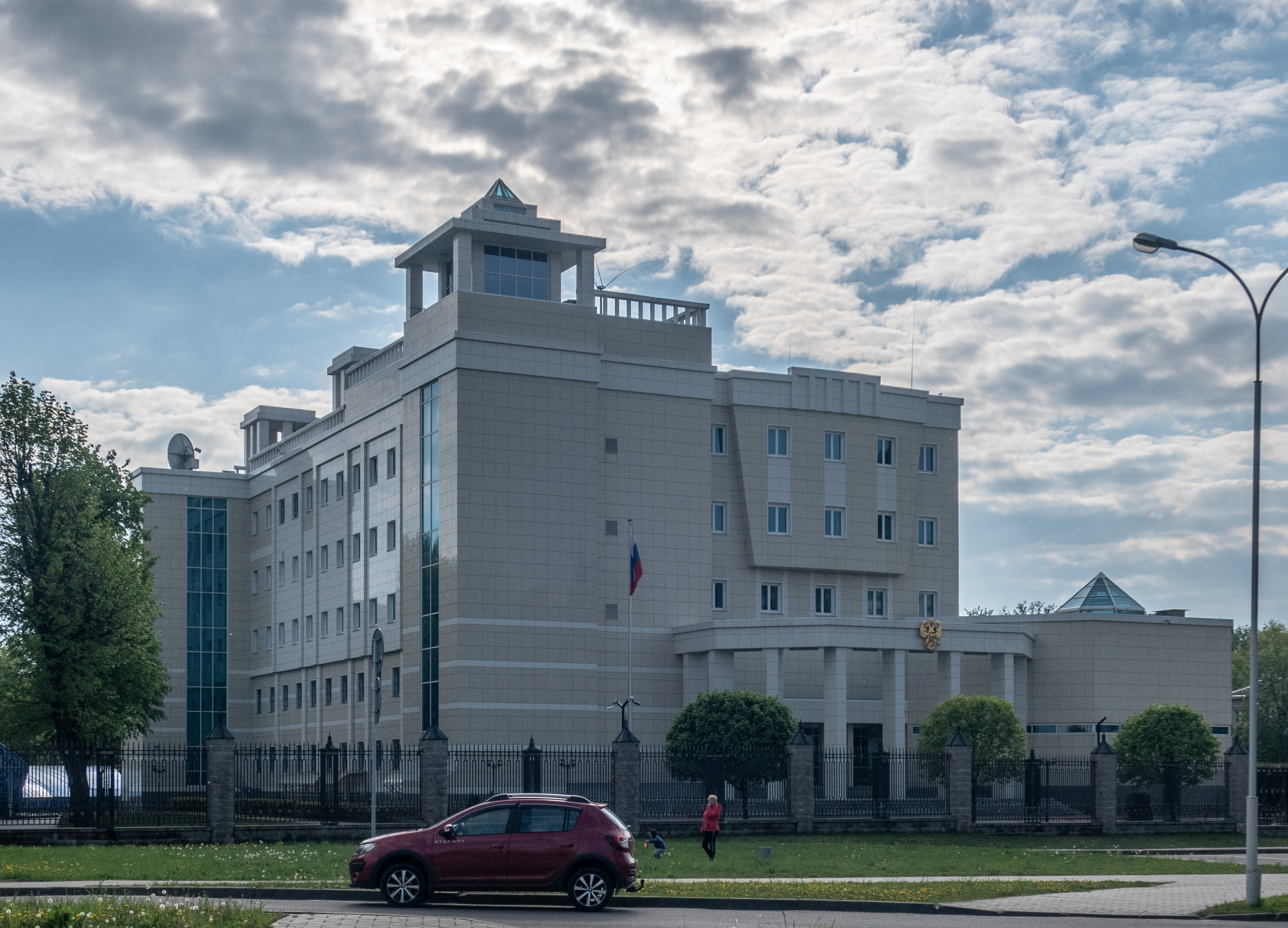
Embassy in Minsk

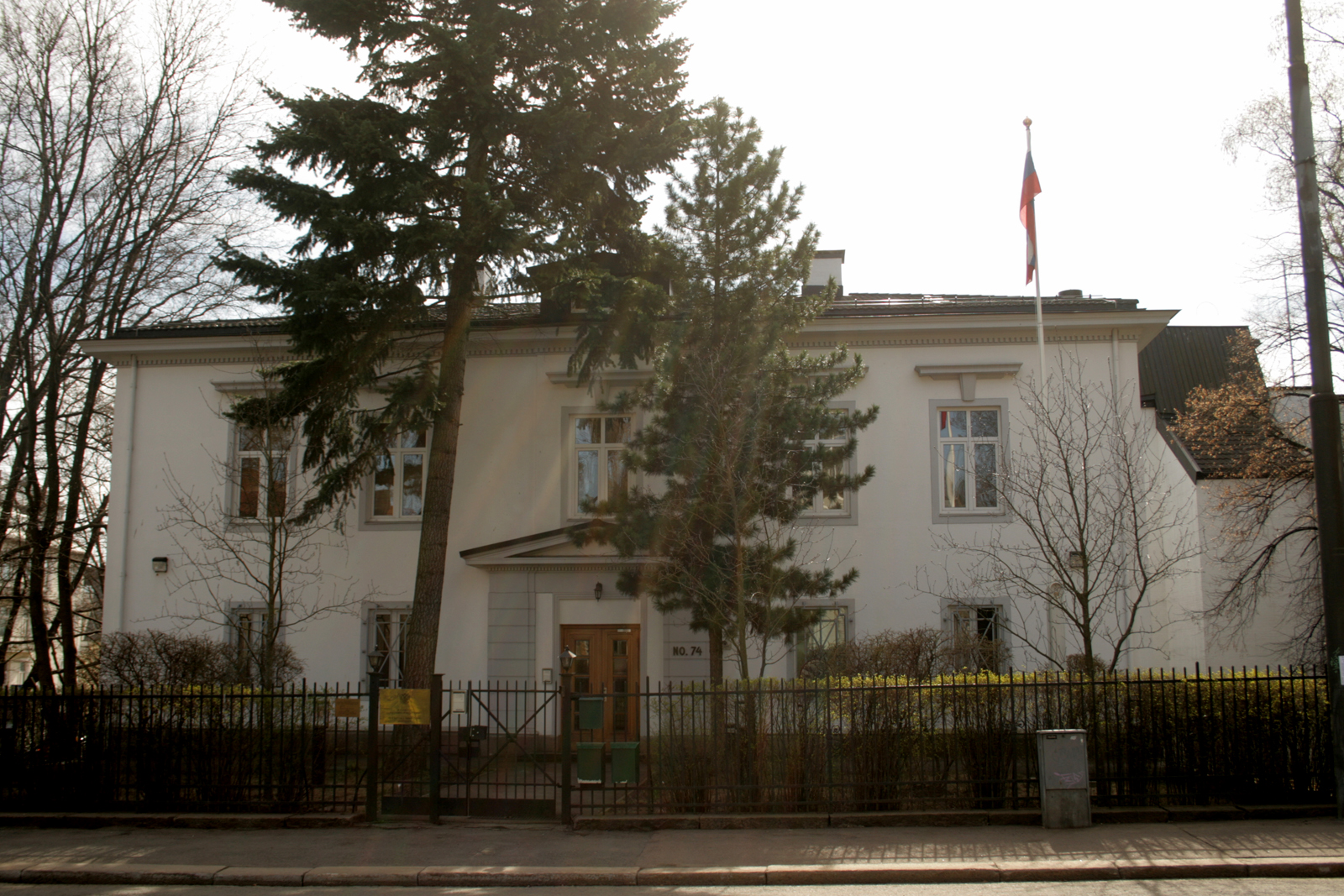
Embassy in Oslo

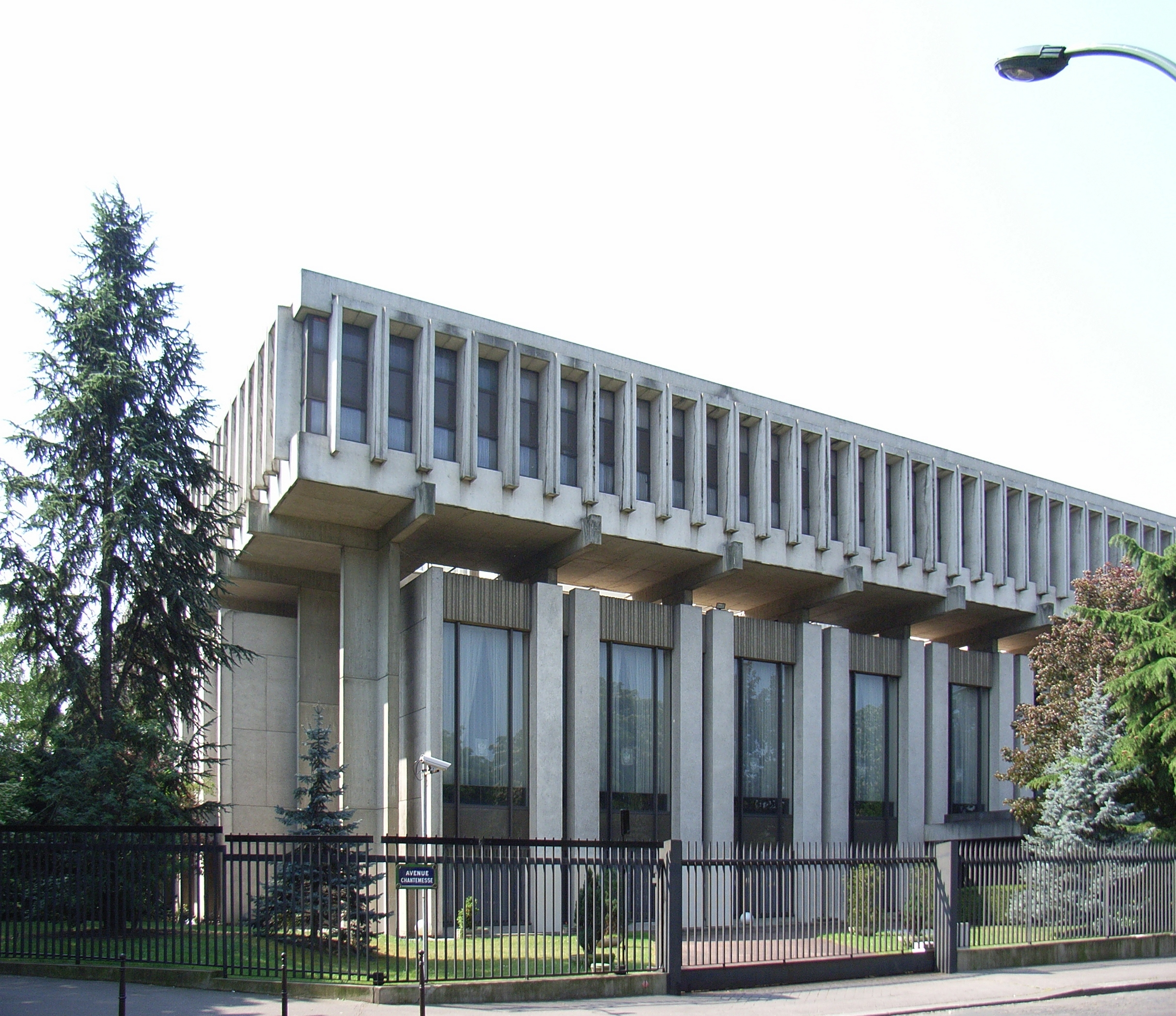
Embassy in Paris

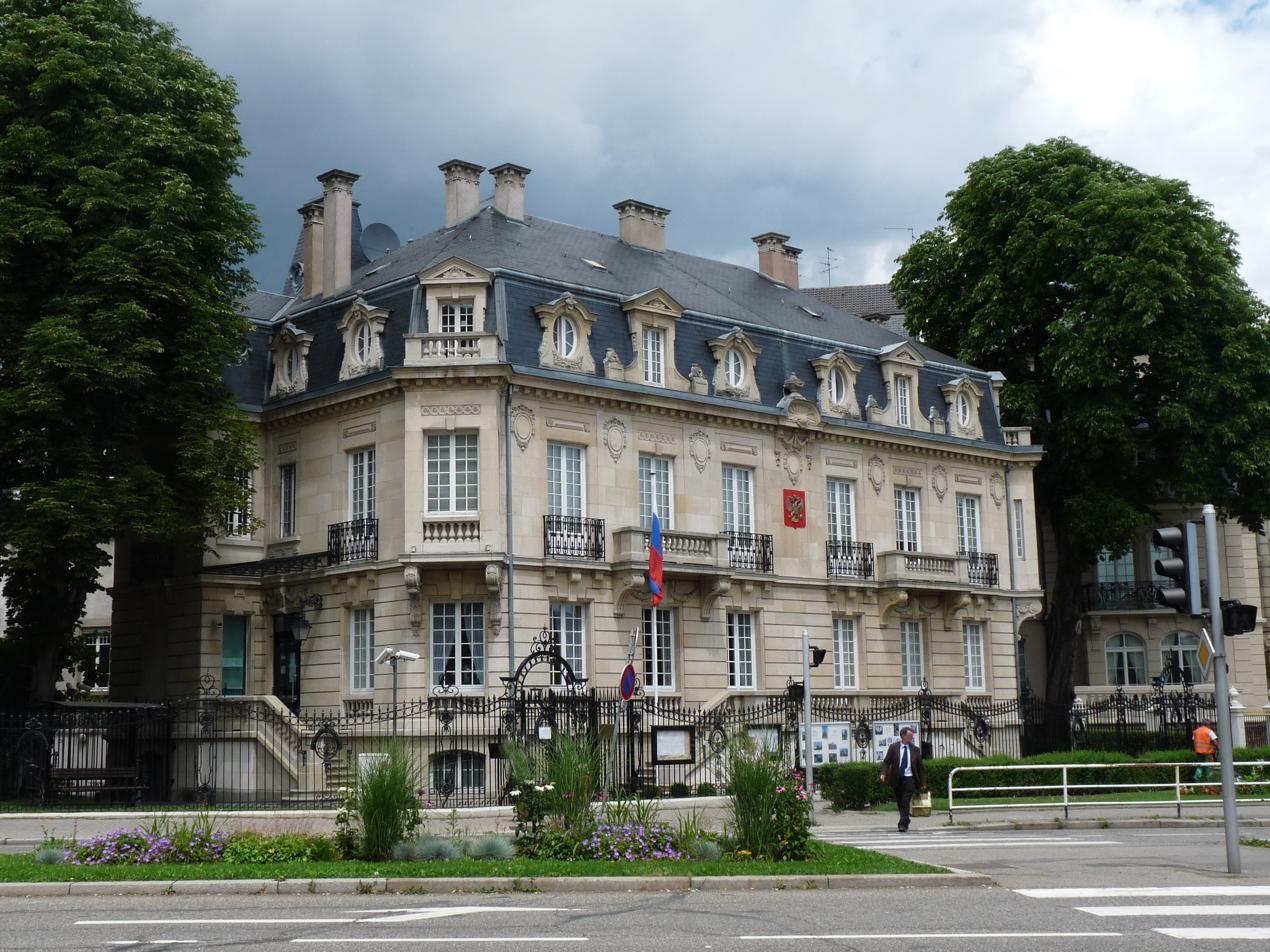
Consulate General in Strasbourg

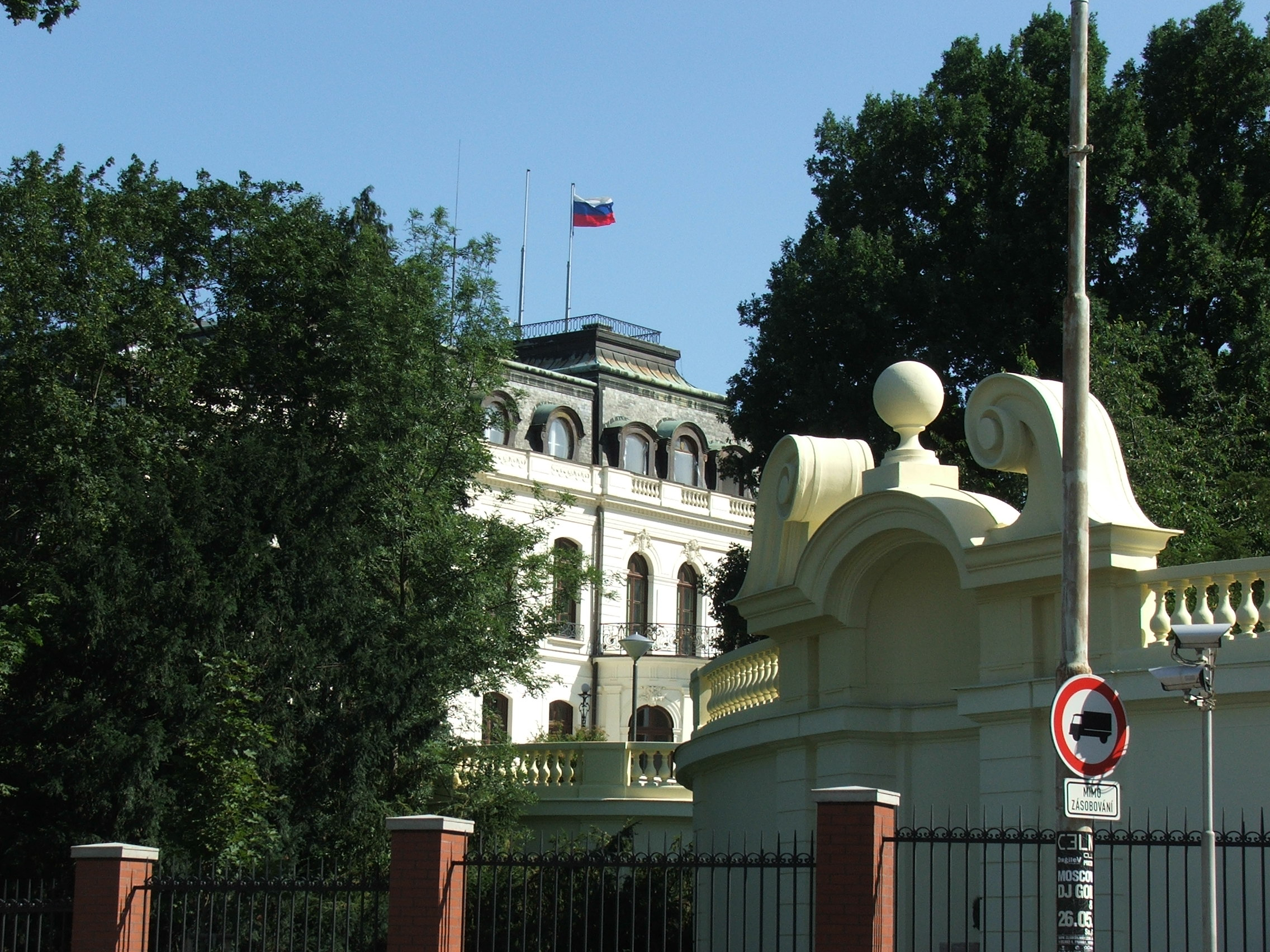
Embassy in Prague

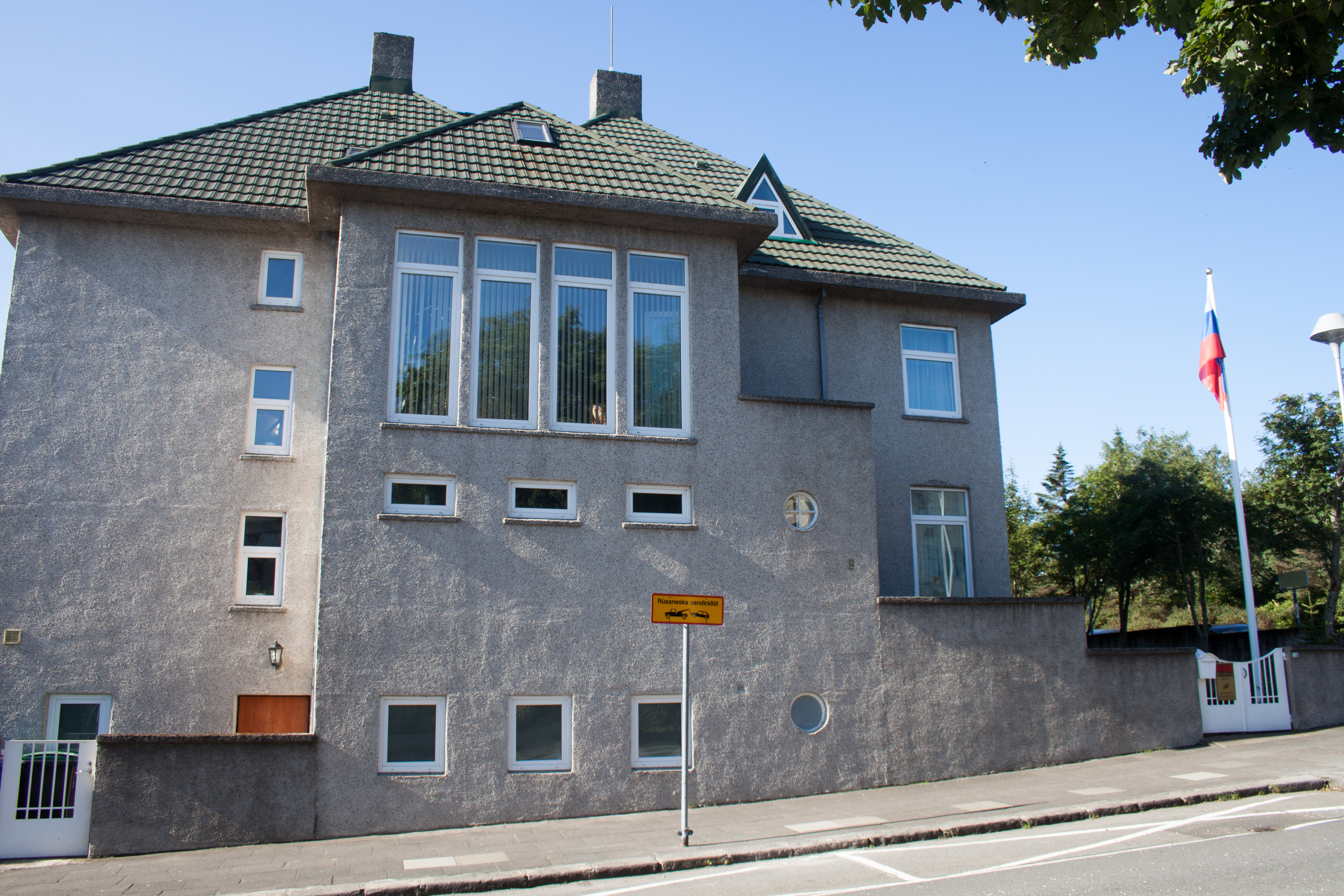
Embassy in Reykjavík

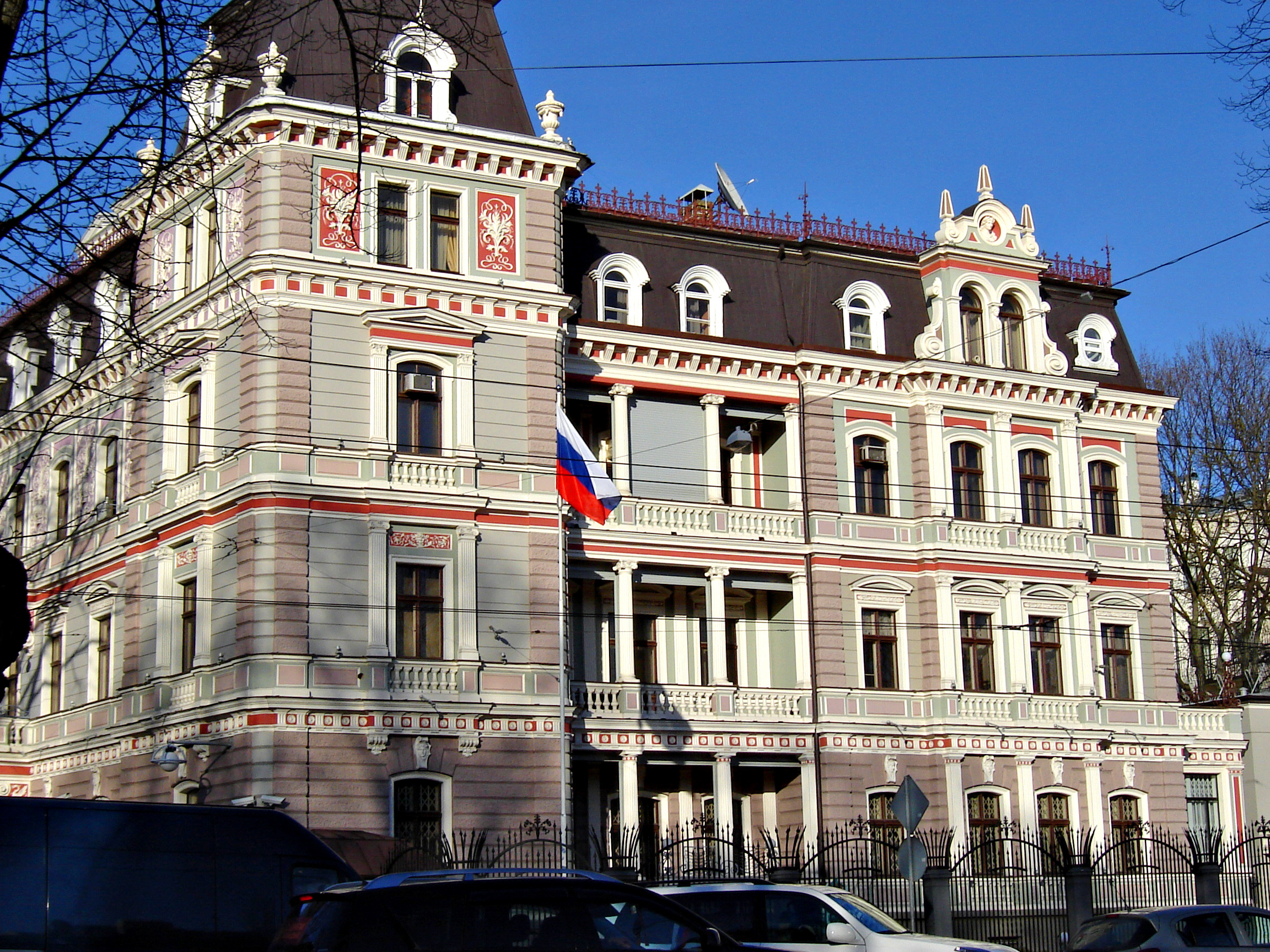
Embassy in Riga

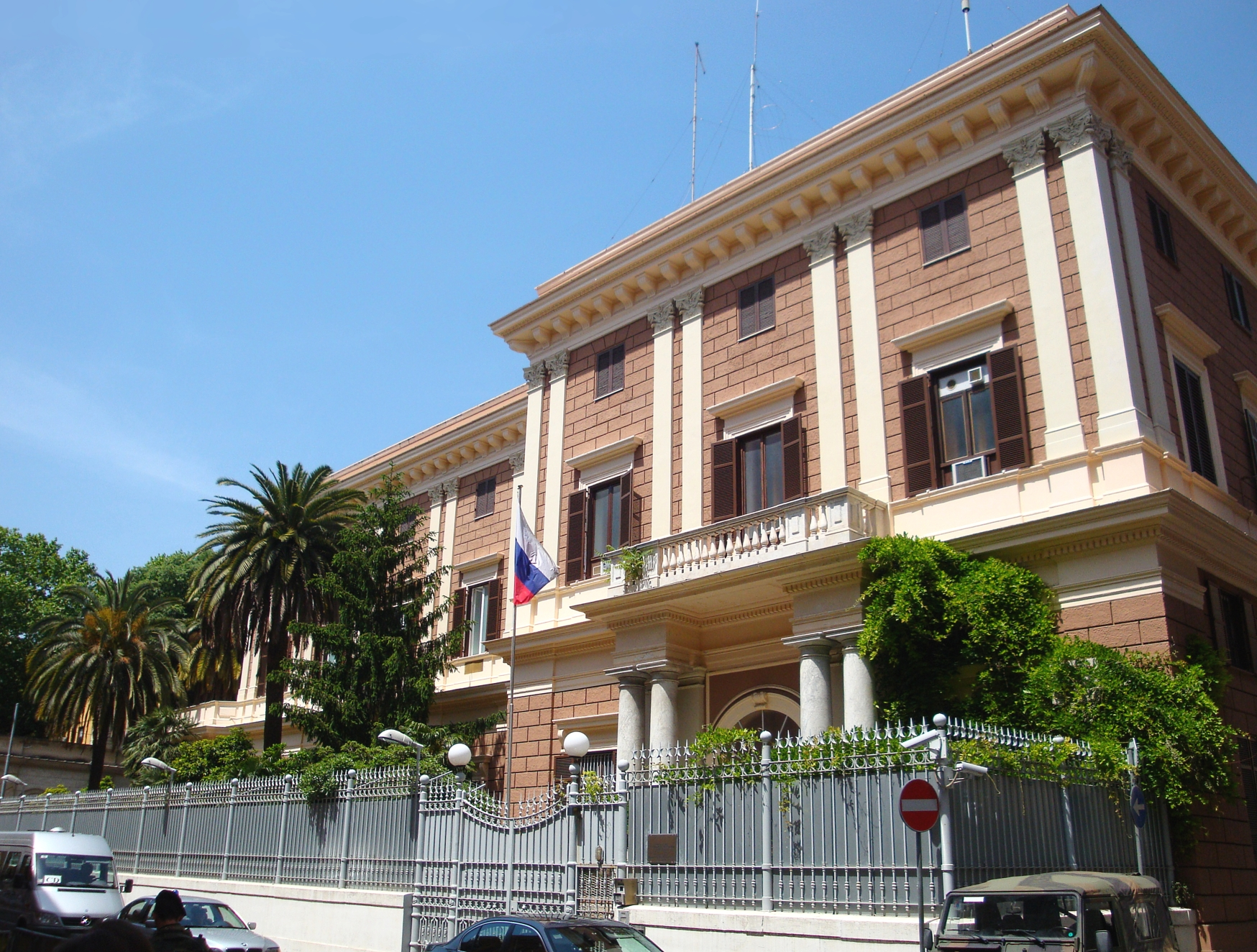
Embassy in Rome

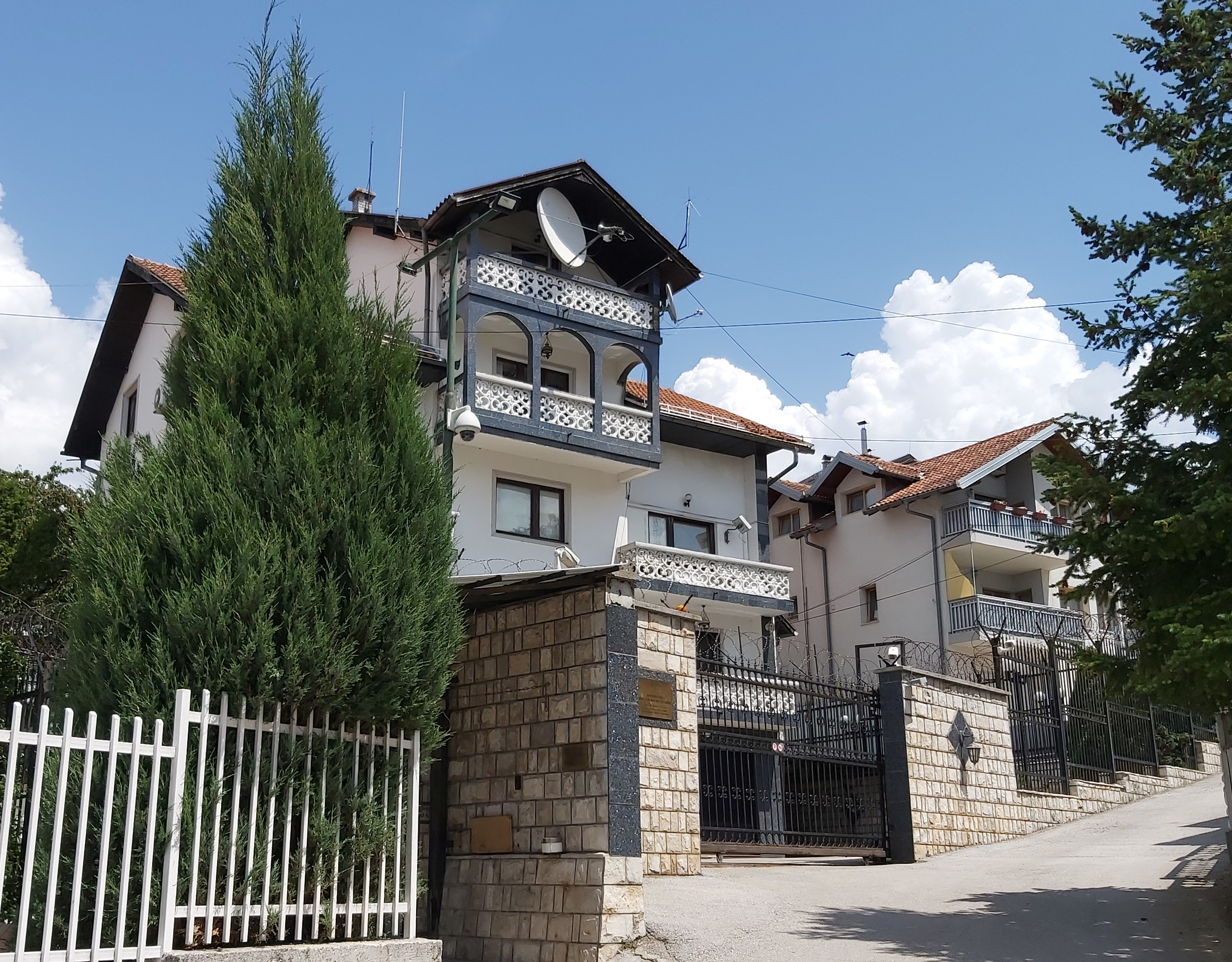
Embassy in Sarajevo

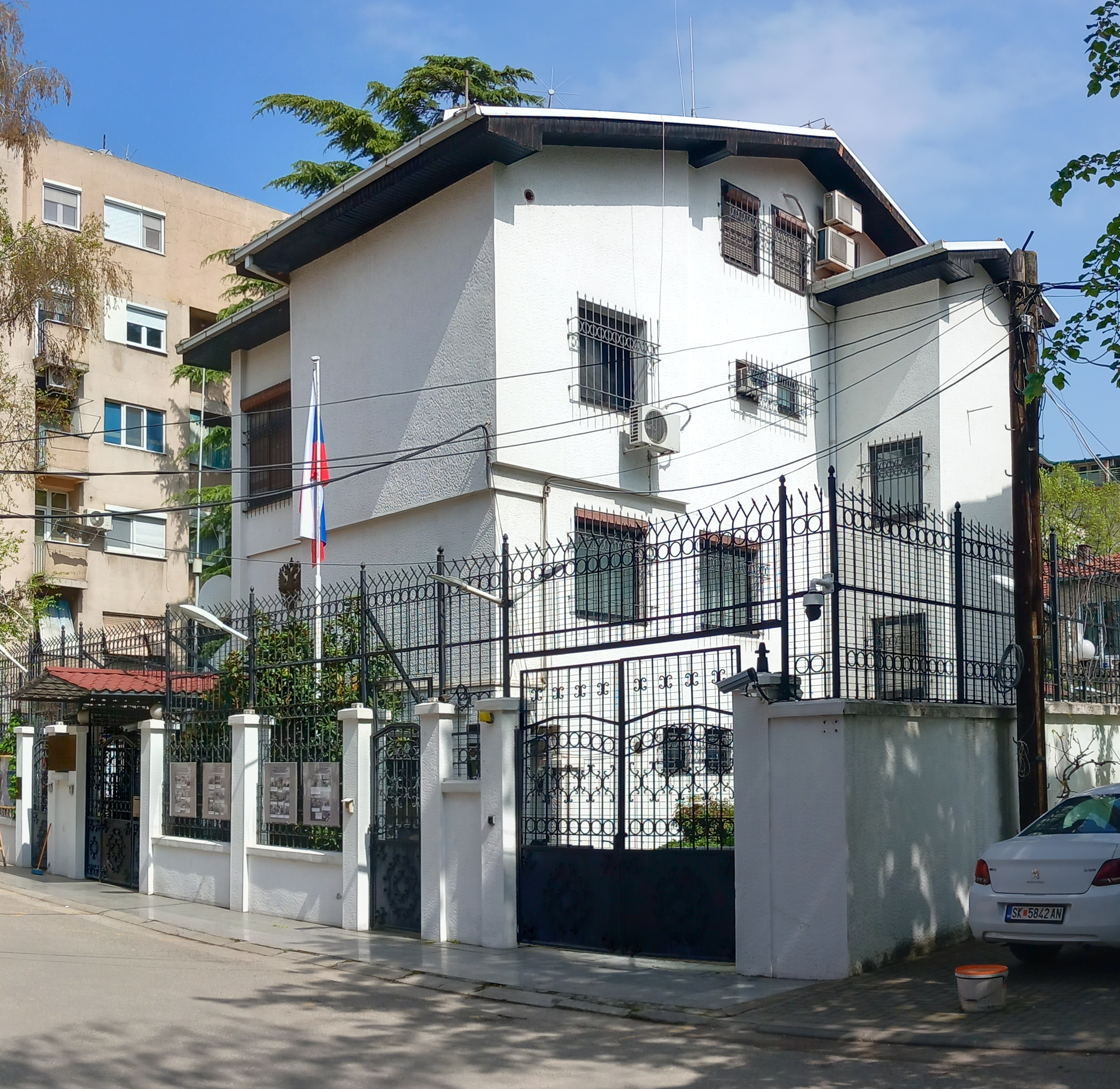
Embassy in Skopje

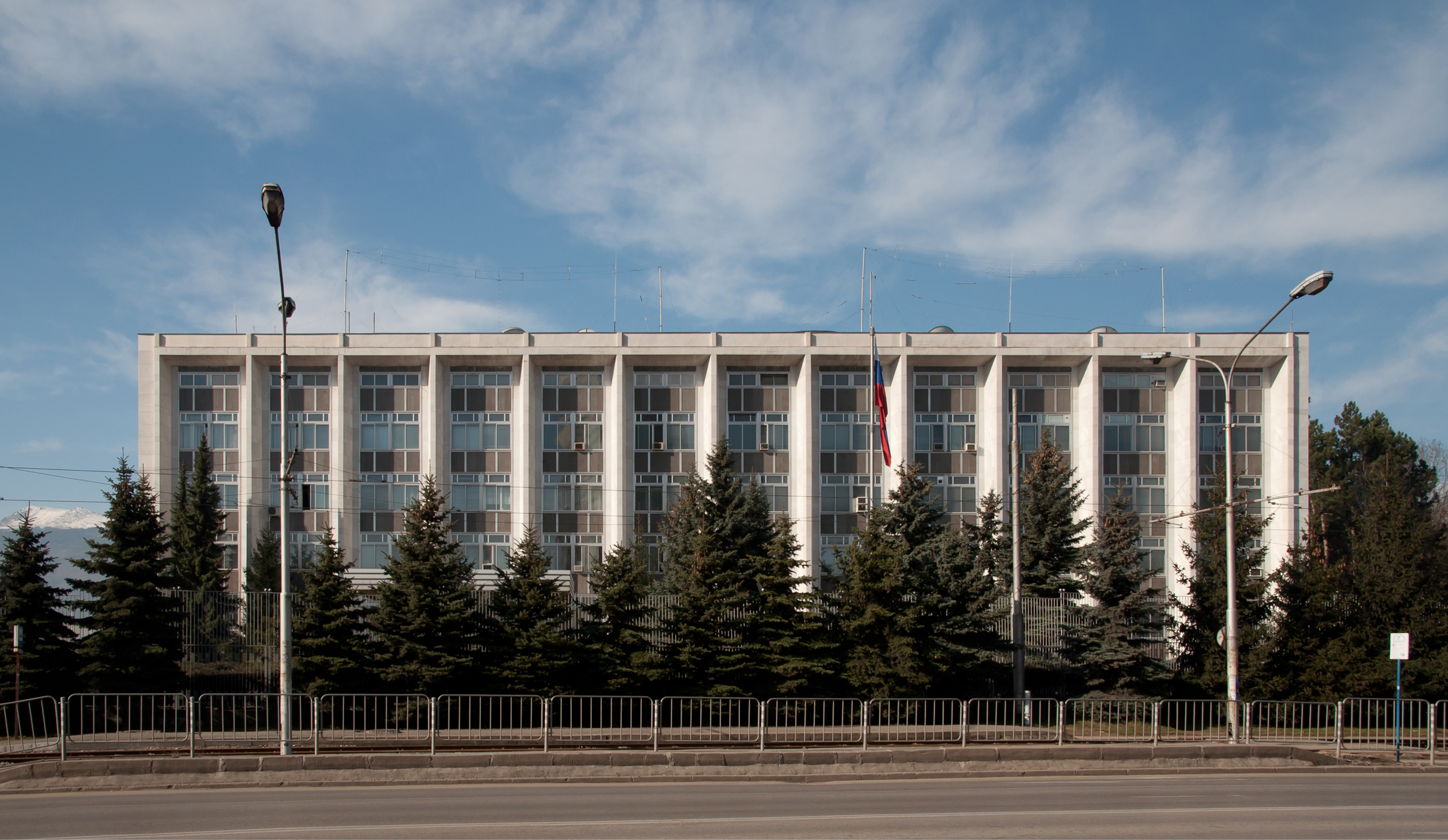
Embassy in Sofia

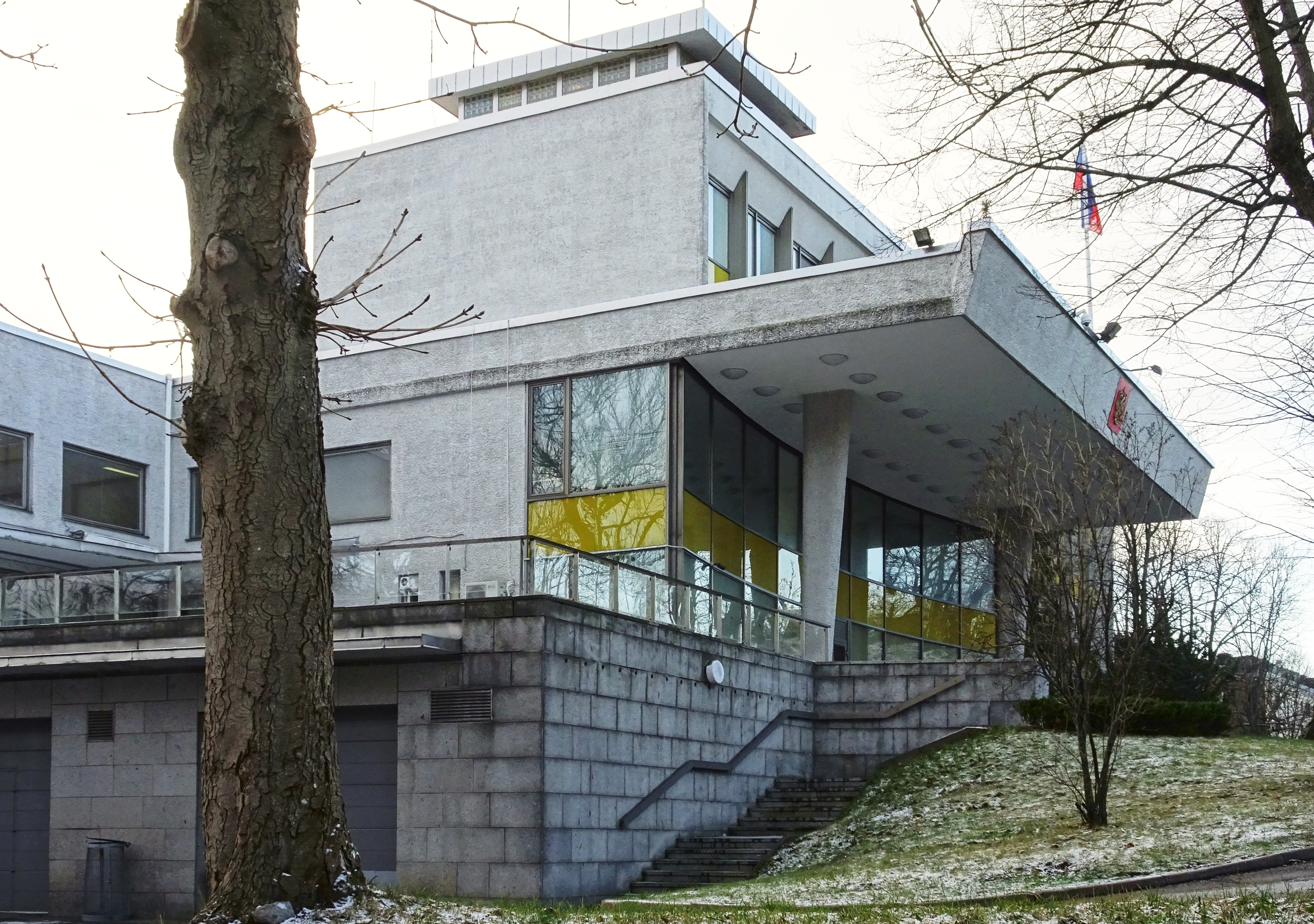
Embassy in Stockholm

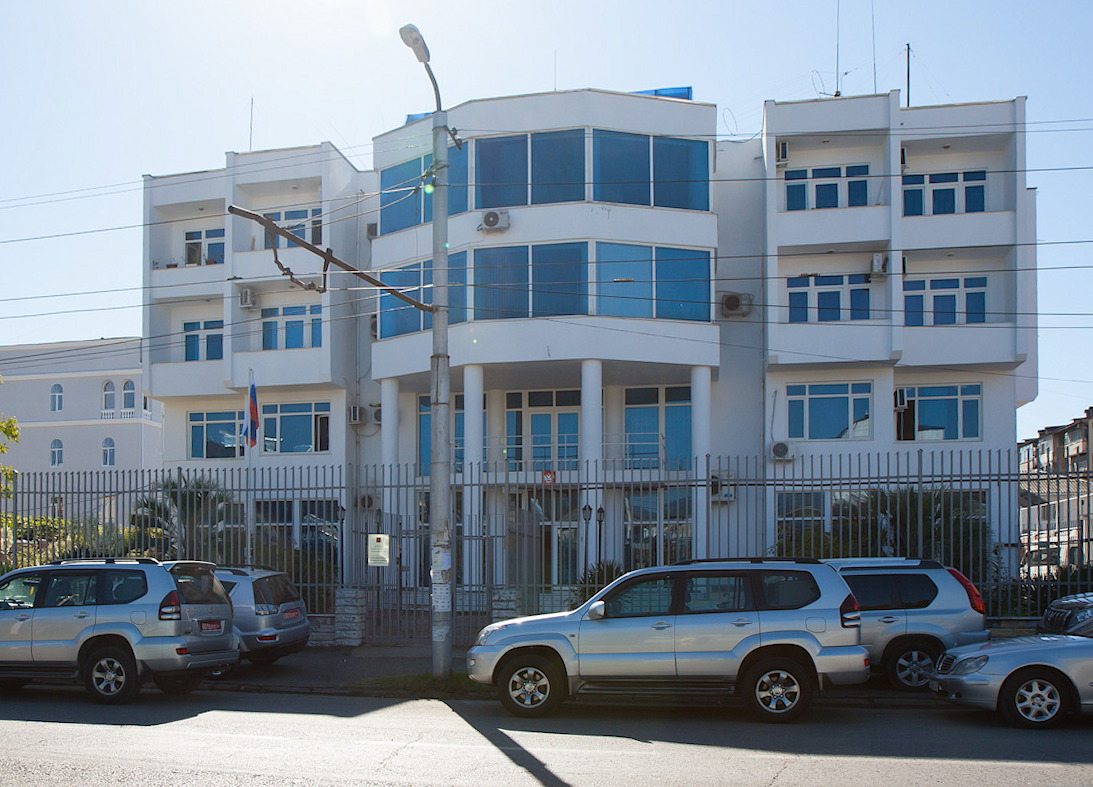
Embassy in Sukhumi

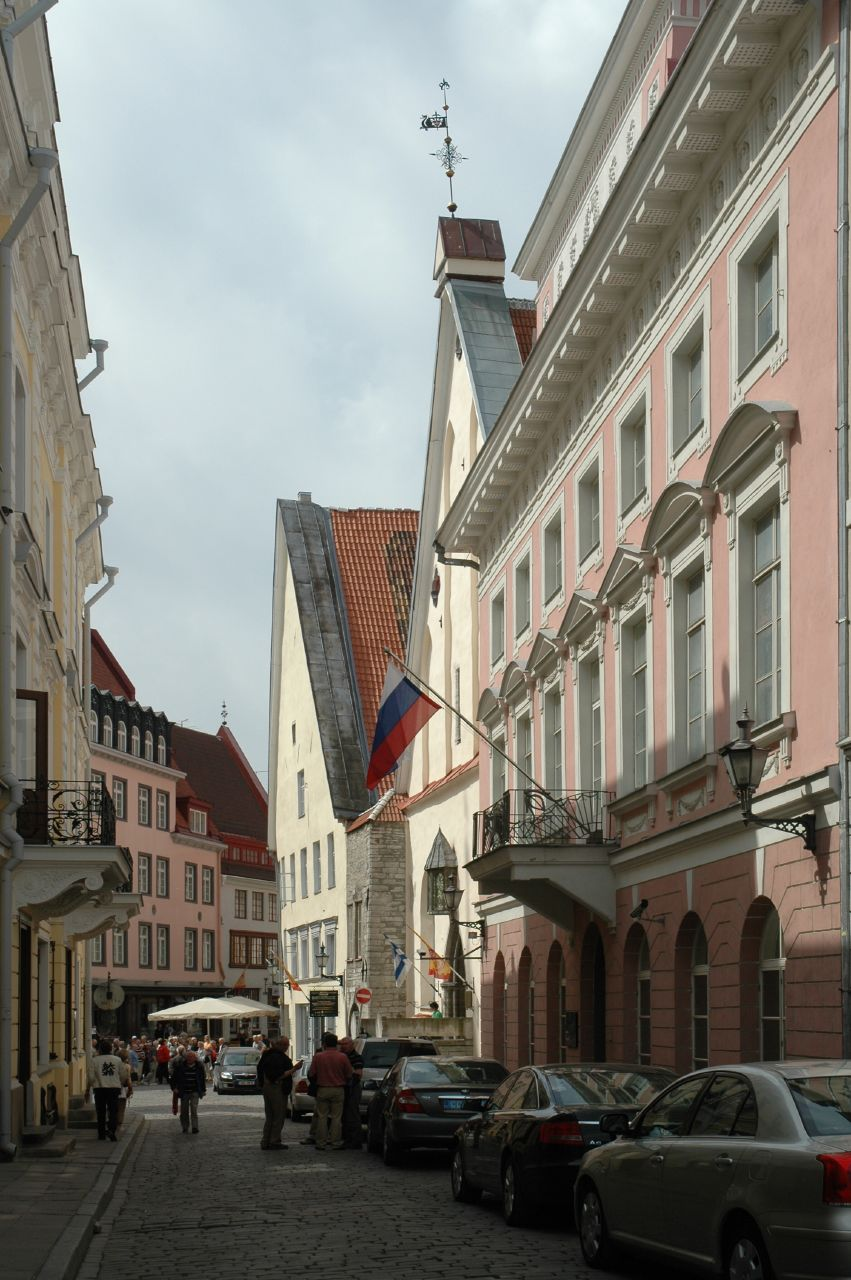
Embassy in Tallinn

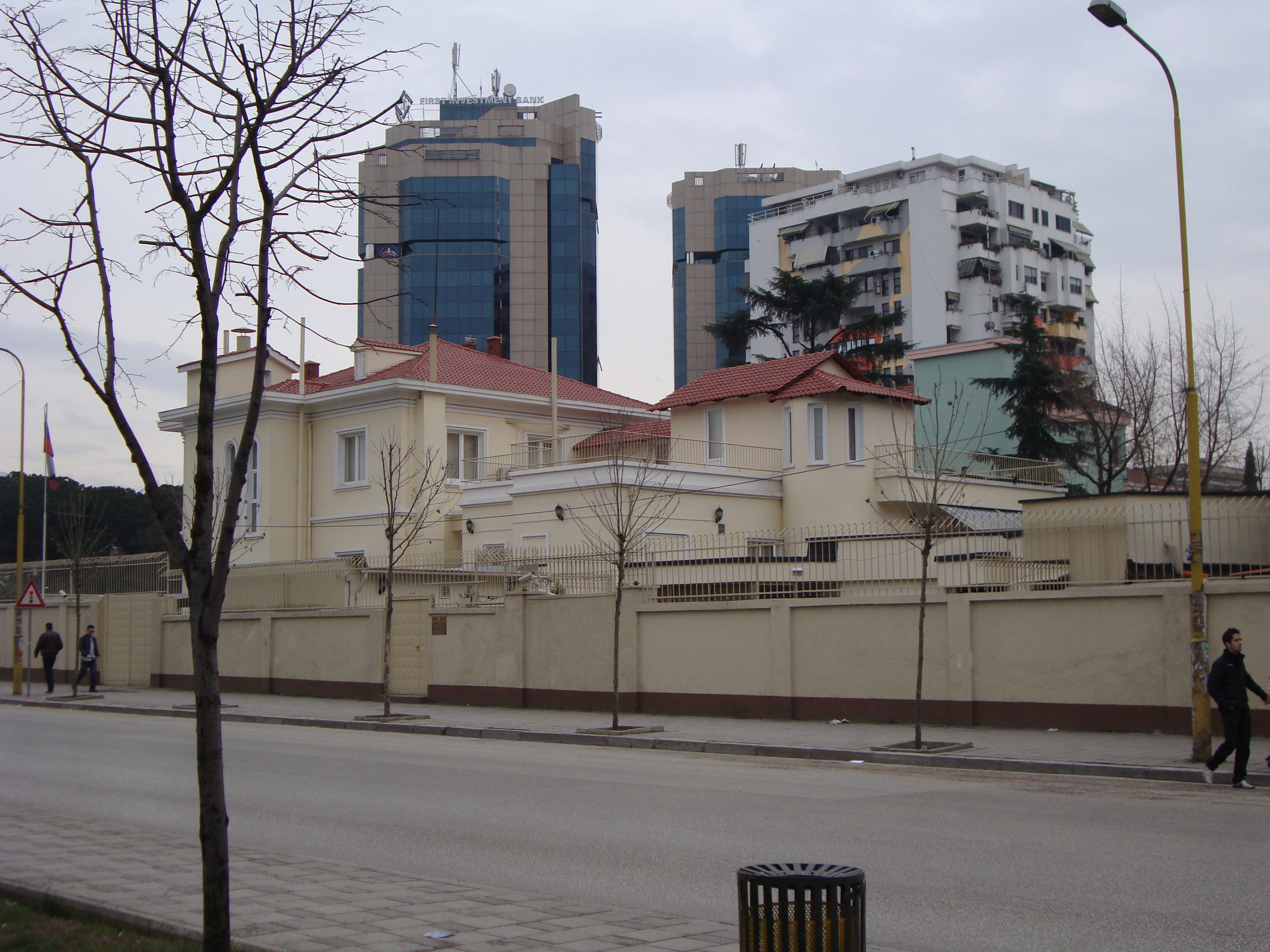
Embassy in Tirana

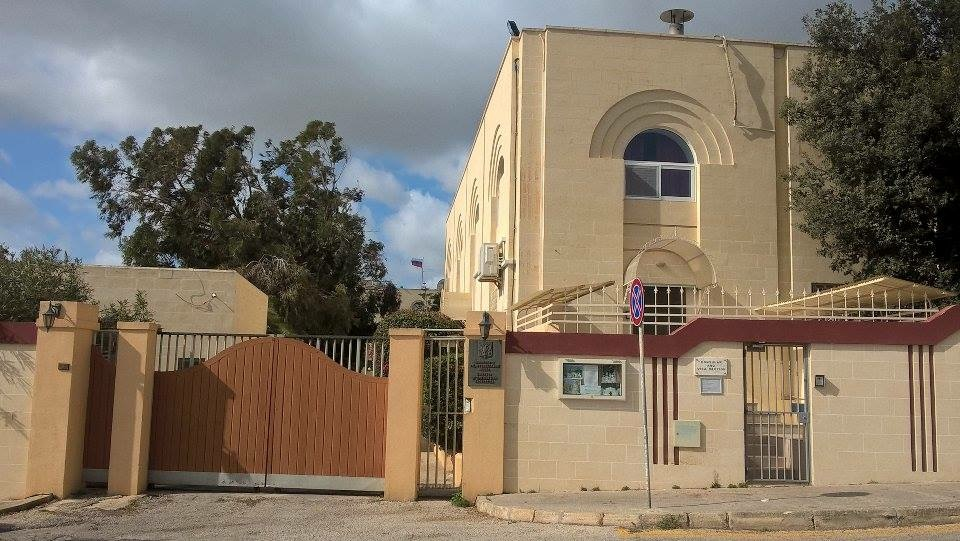
Embassy in Valletta

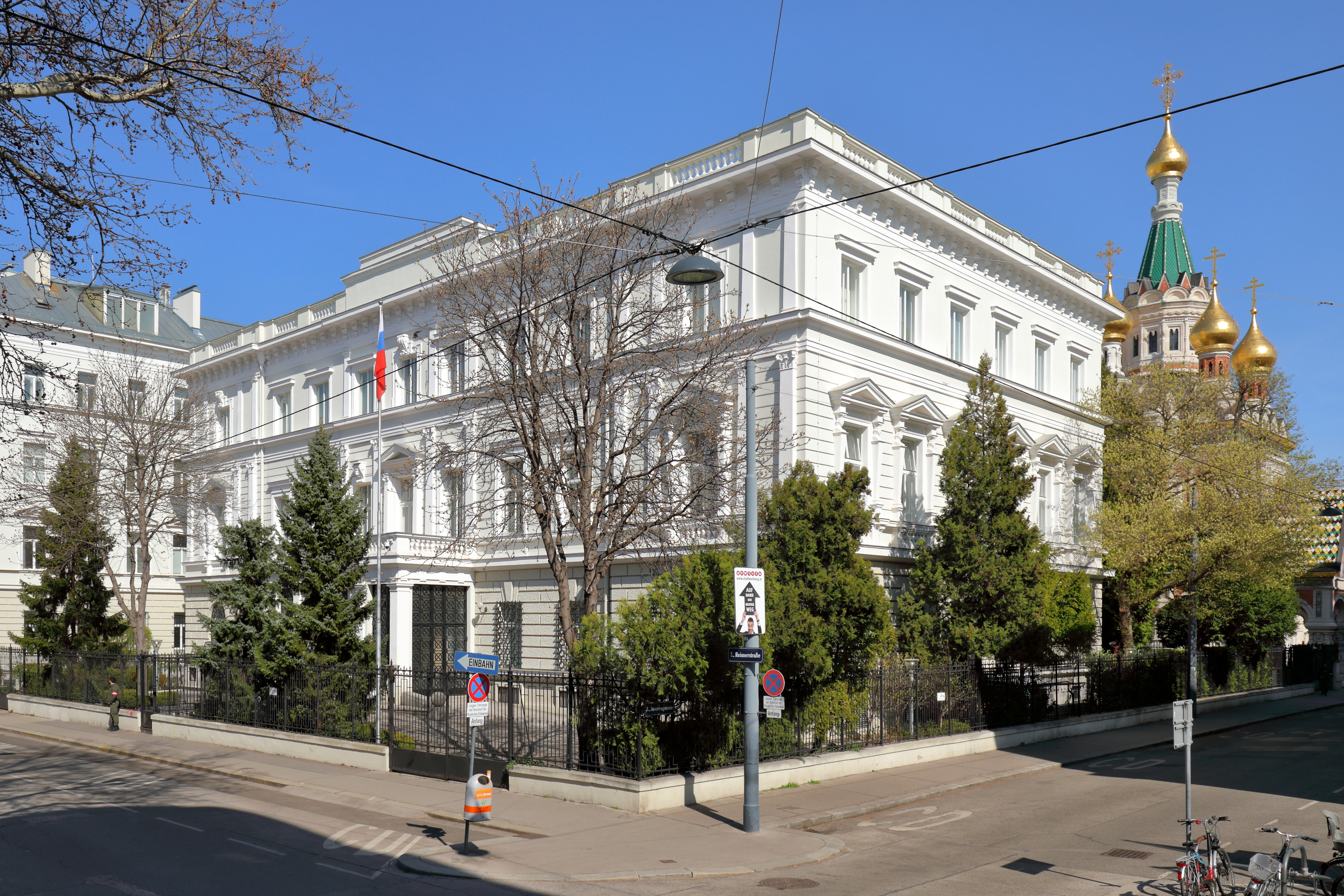
Embassy in Vienna

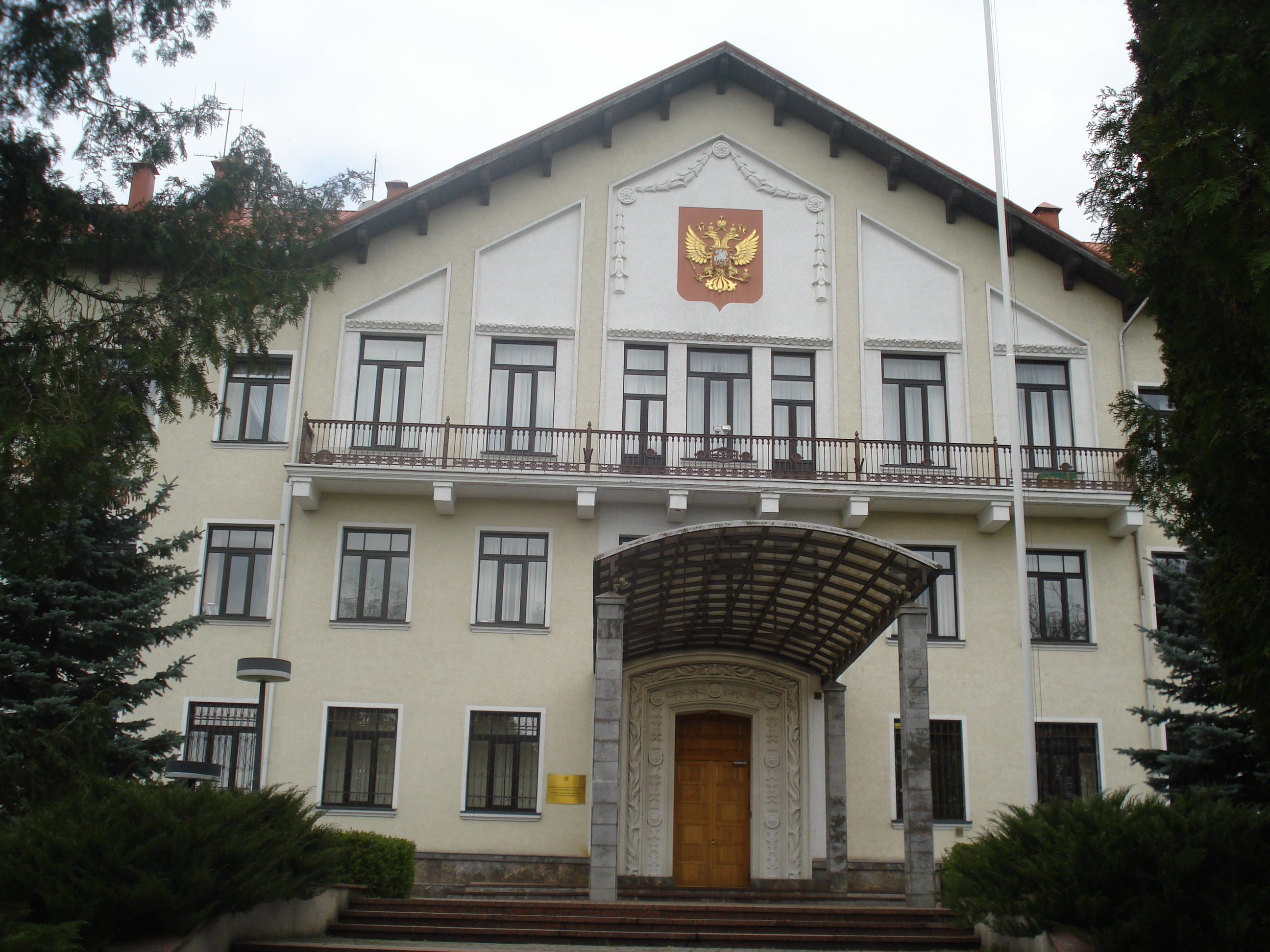
Embassy in Vilnius

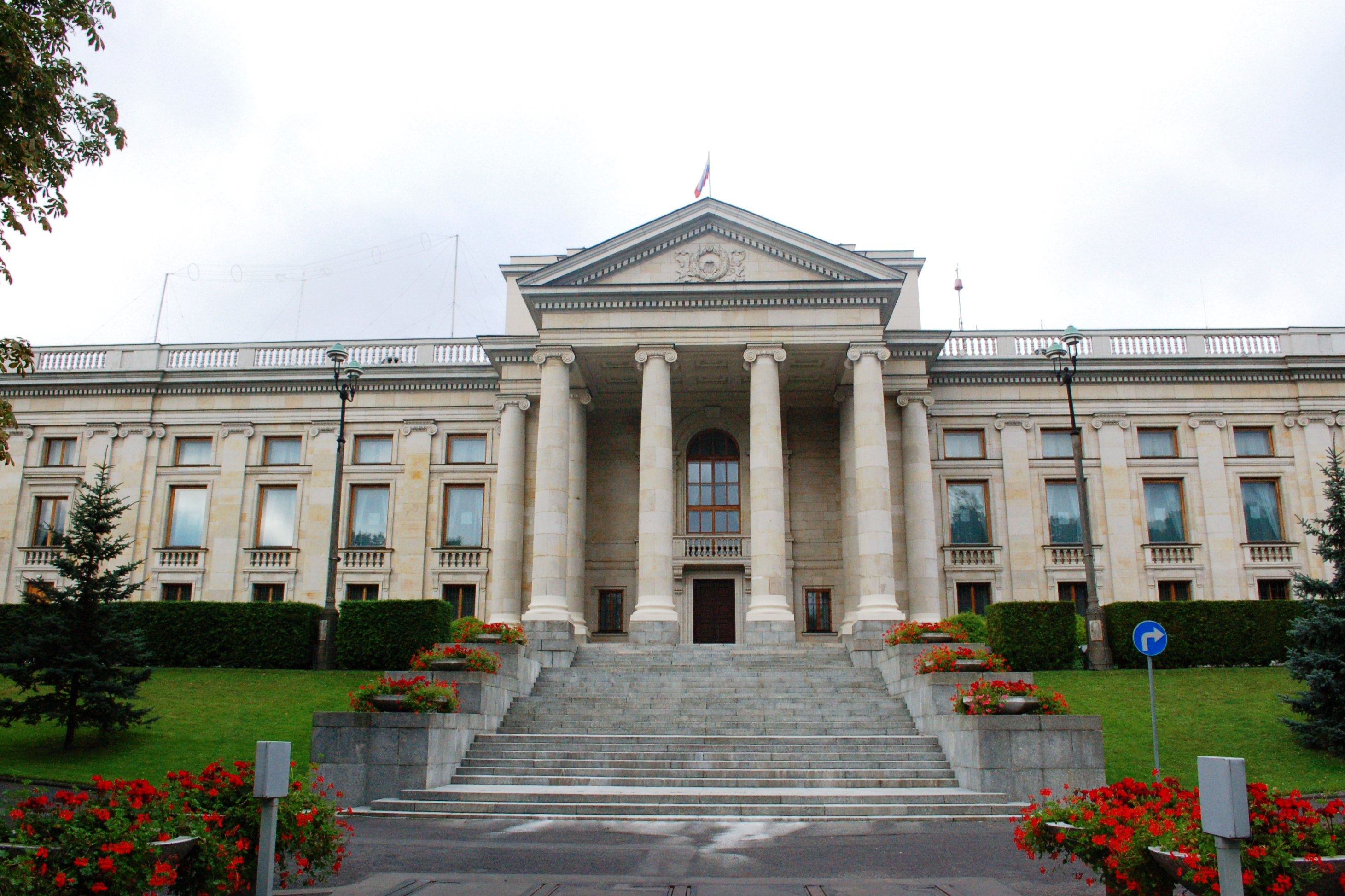
Embassy in Warsaw

=== Oceania ===
Host country	Host city	Mission	Concurrent accreditation	Ref.
Australia	Canberra	Embassy	Countries: Fiji; Nauru; Tuvalu; Vanuatu	
Australia	Sydney	Consulate General		
New Zealand	Wellington	Embassy	Countries: Samoa; Tonga	

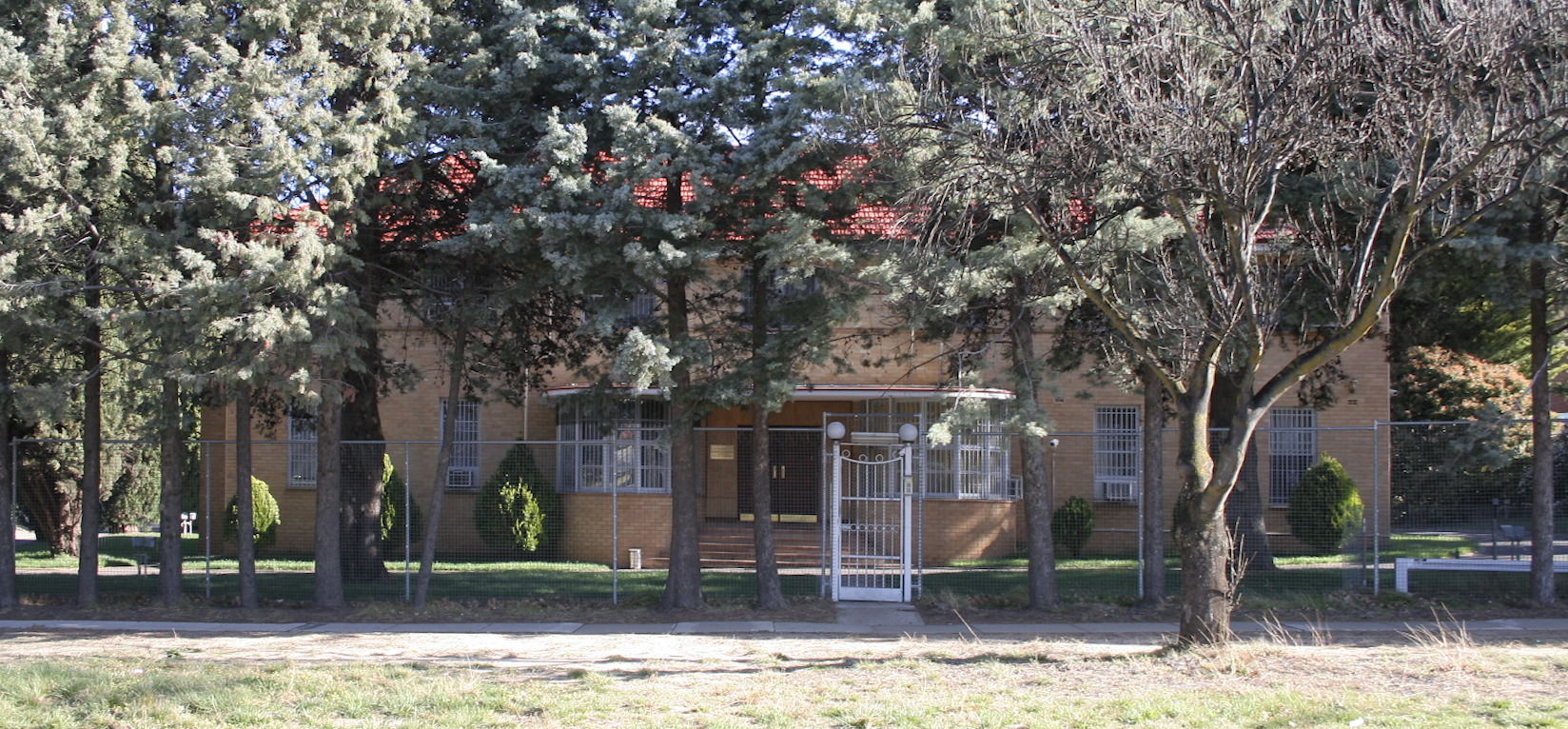
Embassy in Canberra

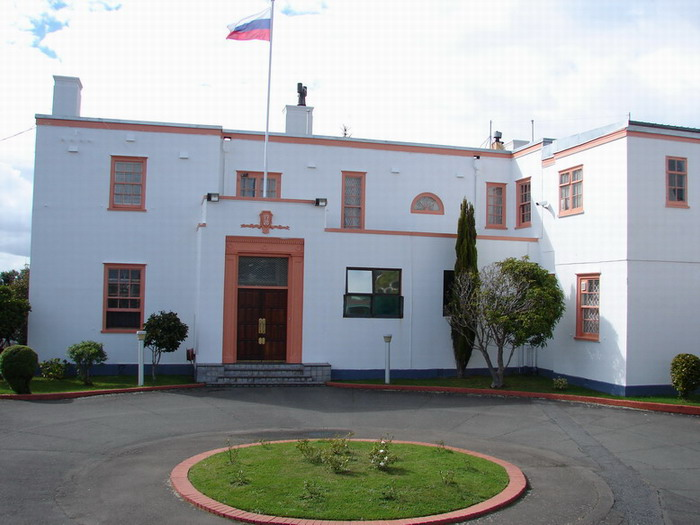
Embassy in Wellington

=== International organizations ===
Organization	Host city	Host country	Mission	Concurrent accreditation	Ref.
Economic and Social Commission for Asia and the Pacific	Bangkok	Thailand	Permanent Mission		
European Union	Brussels	Belgium	Permanent Mission		
Council of Europe	Strasbourg	France	Permanent Mission		
Food and Agriculture Organization	Rome	Italy	Permanent Mission		
Organisation of Islamic Cooperation	Jeddah	Saudi Arabia	Permanent Mission		
Organisation for the Prohibition of Chemical Weapons	The Hague	Netherlands	Permanent Mission		
Commonwealth of Independent States	Minsk	Belarus	Permanent Mission		
United Nations	New York City	United States	Permanent Mission	International Organizations: UNIDO; UNODC; International Fund for Agricultural Development; World Food Programme	
United Nations	Geneva	Switzerland	Permanent Mission	International Organizations: UNIDO; UNODC; International Fund for Agricultural Development; World Food Programme	
United Nations	Vienna	Austria	Permanent Mission	International Organizations: UNIDO; UNODC; International Fund for Agricultural Development; World Food Programme	
UNESCO	Paris	France	Permanent Mission		
World Trade Organization	Geneva	Switzerland	Permanent Mission		

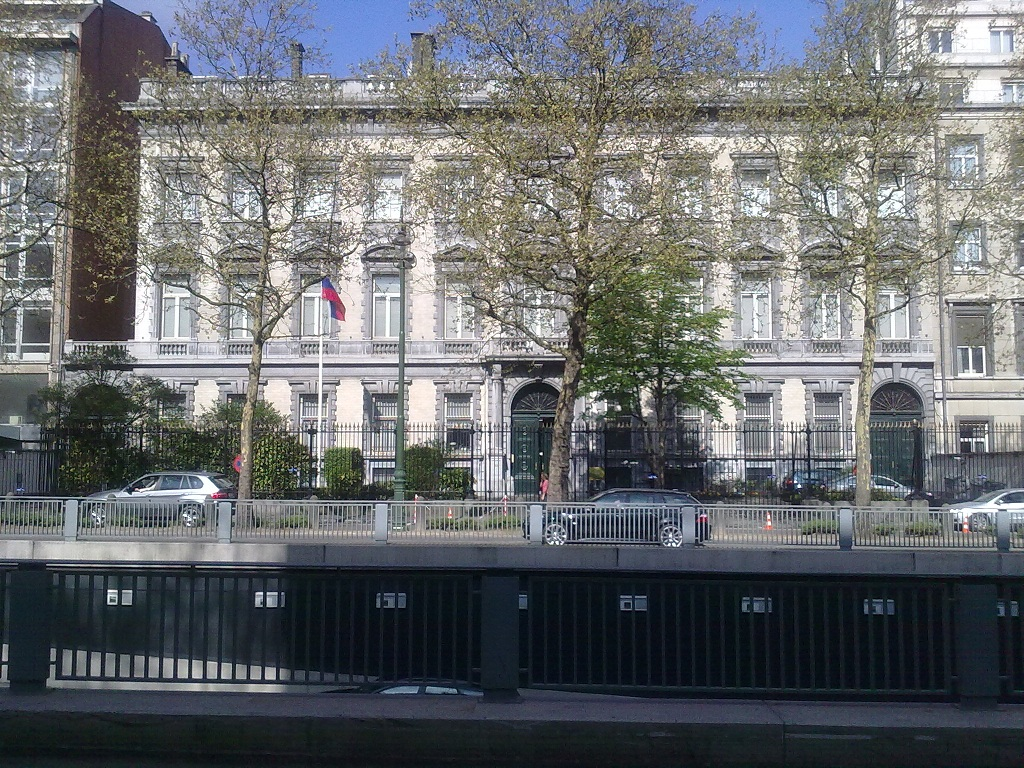
Permanent Mission to the European Union in Brussels

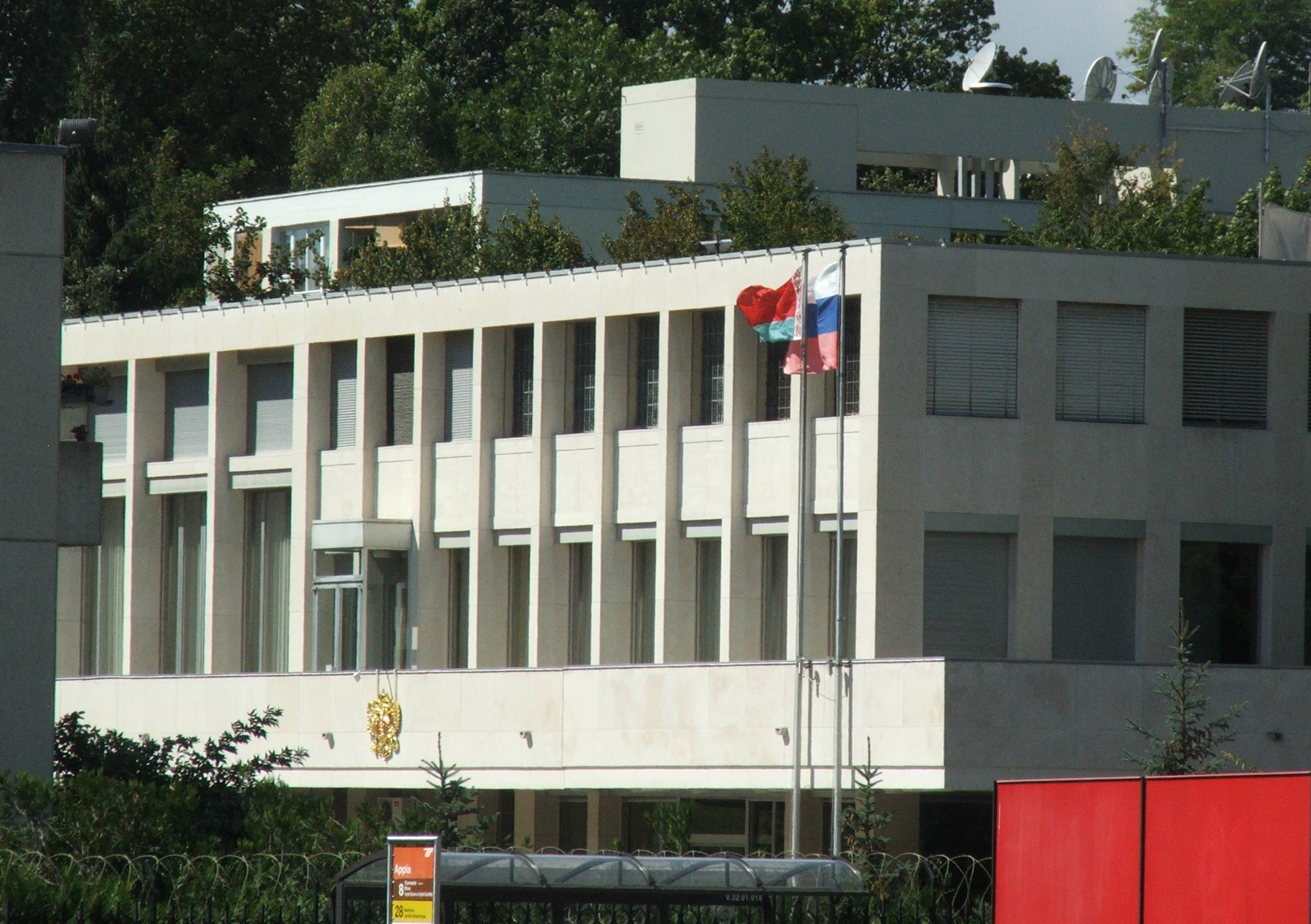
Permanent Mission to the United Nations in Geneva

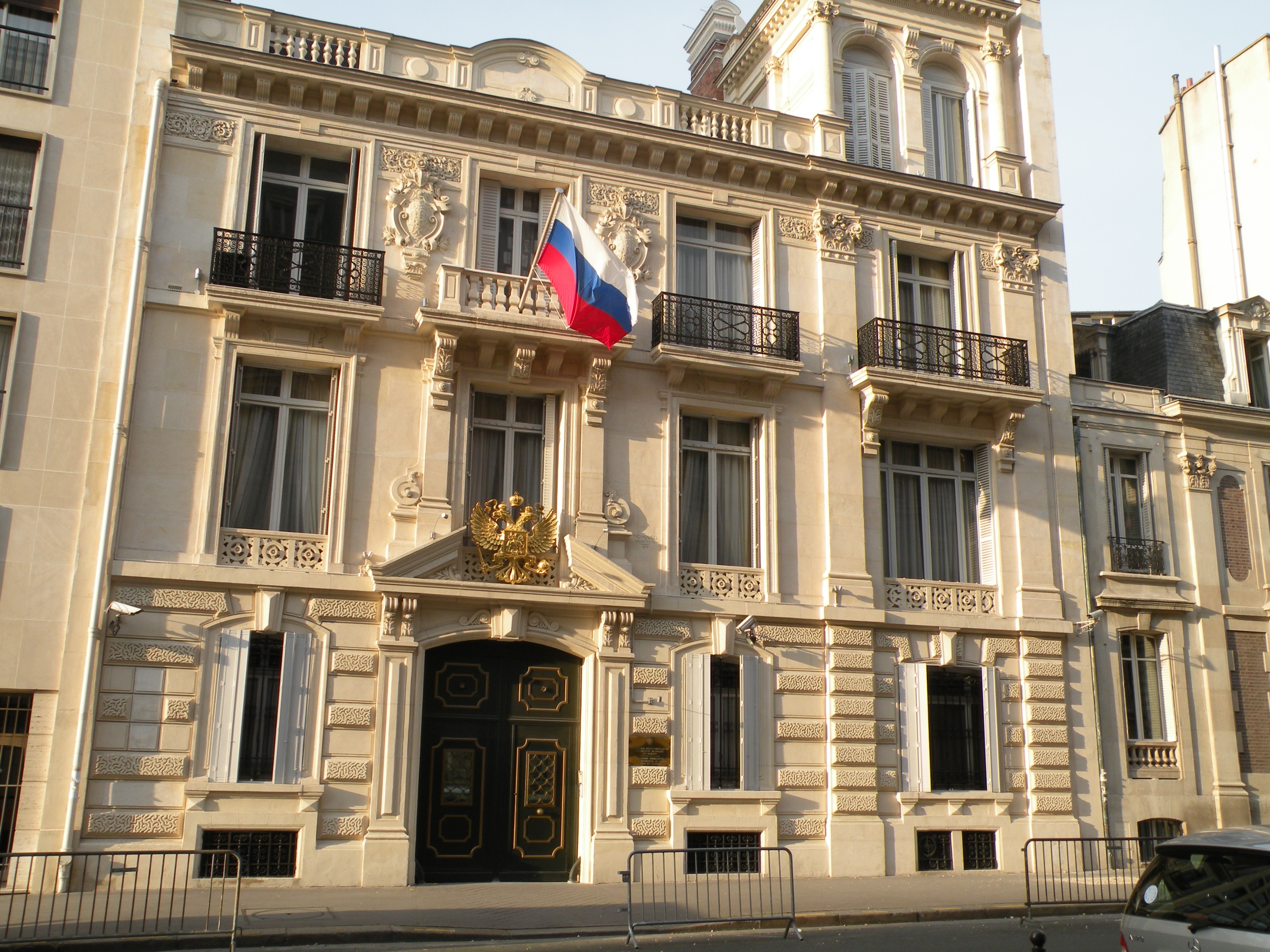
Permanent Mission to UNESCO in Paris

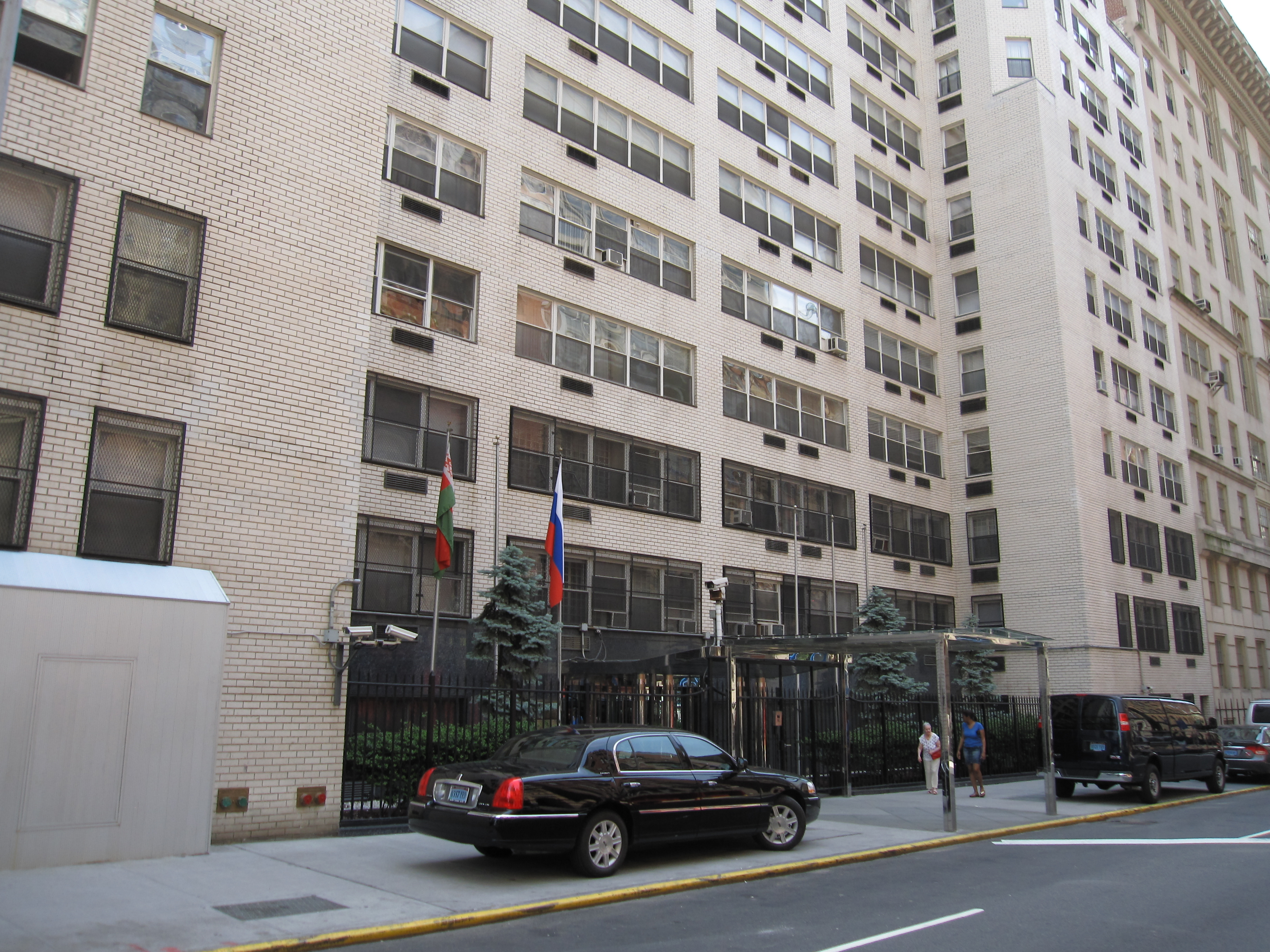
Permanent Mission to the United Nations in New York City

== Missions to open ==
Host country	Host city	Mission	Ref.
Comoros	Moroni	Embassy	
Liberia	Monrovia	Embassy	
Togo	Lome	Embassy	
Uzbekistan	Samarkand	Consulate General	

== Closed missions ==
=== Africa ===
Host country	Host city	Mission	Year closed	Ref.
Algeria	Annaba	Consulate General	2016	
Lesotho	Maseru	Embassy (Note: Resident in Pretoria, South Africa)	1992	
Liberia	Monrovia	Embassy (Note: Resident in Accra, Ghana)	1992	
São Tomé and Príncipe	São Tomé	Embassy (Note: Resident in Luanda, Angola)	1992	
Somali Democratic Republic	Mogadishu	Embassy (Note: Resident in Djibouti City, Djibouti)	1992	
Togo	Lomé	Embassy (Note: Resident in Cotonou, Benin)	1992	

=== Americas ===
Host country	Host city	Mission	Year closed	Ref.
Suriname	Paramaribo	Embassy (Note: Resident in Brasília, Brazil)	1995	
United States	Chicago	Consulate General	ca. 1933	
United States	Honolulu	Consulate General		
United States	Philadelphia	Consulate General		
United States	Portland	Consulate General	1901	
United States	San Francisco	Consulate General	2017	
United States	Seattle	Consulate General	2018	

=== Asia ===
Host country	Host city	Mission	Closing date	Ref.
Ottoman Empire	Jerusalem	Consulate General (Note: Continues as an embassy in Tel Aviv, and a consulate-general in Haifa, Israel.)	1914	
Emirate of Bukhara	Kogon	Political agency (Note: Continues as an embassy in Tashkent, Uzbekistan.)	1917	
Empire of Japan	Kobe	Consulate General	1938	
Empire of Japan	Otaru	Vice Consulate	1938	

=== Oceania ===
Host country	Host city	Mission	Closing date	Ref.
Papua New Guinea	Port Moresby	Embassy	1992	

=== Europe ===
Host country	Host city	Mission	Year closed	Ref.
Bulgaria	Ruse	Consulate General	2022	
Bulgaria	Varna	Consulate General	2022	
Estonia	Narva	Consulate General	2022	
Estonia	Tartu	Consular Section	2022	
Finland	Lappeenranta	Consulate General	2023	
Finland	Turku	Consulate General	2023	
Georgia	Tbilisi	Embassy (Note: Continues as an interest section, protected by Switzerland.)	2008	
Germany	Frankfurt	Consulate General	2024	
Germany	Hamburg	Consulate-General	2024	
Germany	Leipzig	Consulate-General	2024	
Germany	Munich	Consulate General	2024	
Germany	Bonn	Consulate-General	2026	
Latvia	Daugavpils	Consulate General	2022	
Latvia	Liepāja	Consulate-General	2022	
Poland	Gdańsk	Consulate General	2025	
Poland	Kraków	Consulate General	2025	
Poland	Poznań	Consulate General	2024	
Romania	Constanța	Consulate General	2026	
Sweden	Gothenburg	Consulate General	2023	
Ukraine	Kyiv	Embassy	2022	
Ukraine	Kharkiv	Consulate General	2022	
Ukraine	Lviv	Consulate General	2022	
Ukraine	Odesa	Consulate General	2022	
Ukraine	Simferopol	Consulate General	2014	

== See also ==
- Ambassadors of Russia
- Foreign relations of Russia
- List of diplomatic missions in Russia
