= List of ambassadors of Finland to Sweden =

The Ambassador of Finland to Sweden is Finland's foremost diplomatic representative in the Kingdom of Sweden, and in charge of Finland's diplomatic mission in Sweden.

== Ambassadors ==
Representative	Years	Status
Alexis Gripenberg	1918	charge d'affaires
Alexis Gripenberg	1918–1919	Envoy
Werner Söderhjelm	1919–1928	Envoy
Rafael Erich	1928–1936	Envoy
Juho Kusti Paasikivi	1936–1939	Envoy
Eljas Erkko	1939–1940	Envoy
Jarl Axel Wasastjerna	1940–1943	Envoy
G. A. Gripenberg	1943–1954	Envoy
G. A. Gripenberg	1954–1956	Ambassador
Päivö Tarjanne	1956–1961	Ambassador
Sakari Tuomioja	1961–1964	Ambassador
Eero A. Wuori	1964–1965	Charge d'affaires
Carl Enckell	1965–1969	Ambassador
Leo Tuominen	1969–1972	Ambassador
Max Jakobson	1972–1975	Ambassador
Jorma Vanamo	1975–1980	Ambassador
Verner Gustafsson	1980–1983	Ambassador
Björn-Olof Alholm	1983–1991	Ambassador
Matti Kahiluoto	1991–1996	Ambassador
Heikki Talvitie	1996–2002	Ambassador
Pertti Torstila	2002–2006	Ambassador
Alec Aalto	2006–2010	Ambassador
Markus Lyra	2010–2011	Ambassador
Harry Helenius	2011–2014	Ambassador
Jarmo Viinanen	2014–2016	Ambassador
Mikael Antell	2016–2017	Charge d'affaires
Matti Anttonen	2017–2018	Ambassador
Liisa Talonpoika	2018–	Ambassador

== See also ==
- Finland-Sweden relations
- Embassy of Finland, Stockholm
- Embassy of Sweden, Helsinki
- List of ambassadors of Sweden to Finland
