= Finland–Sweden relations =

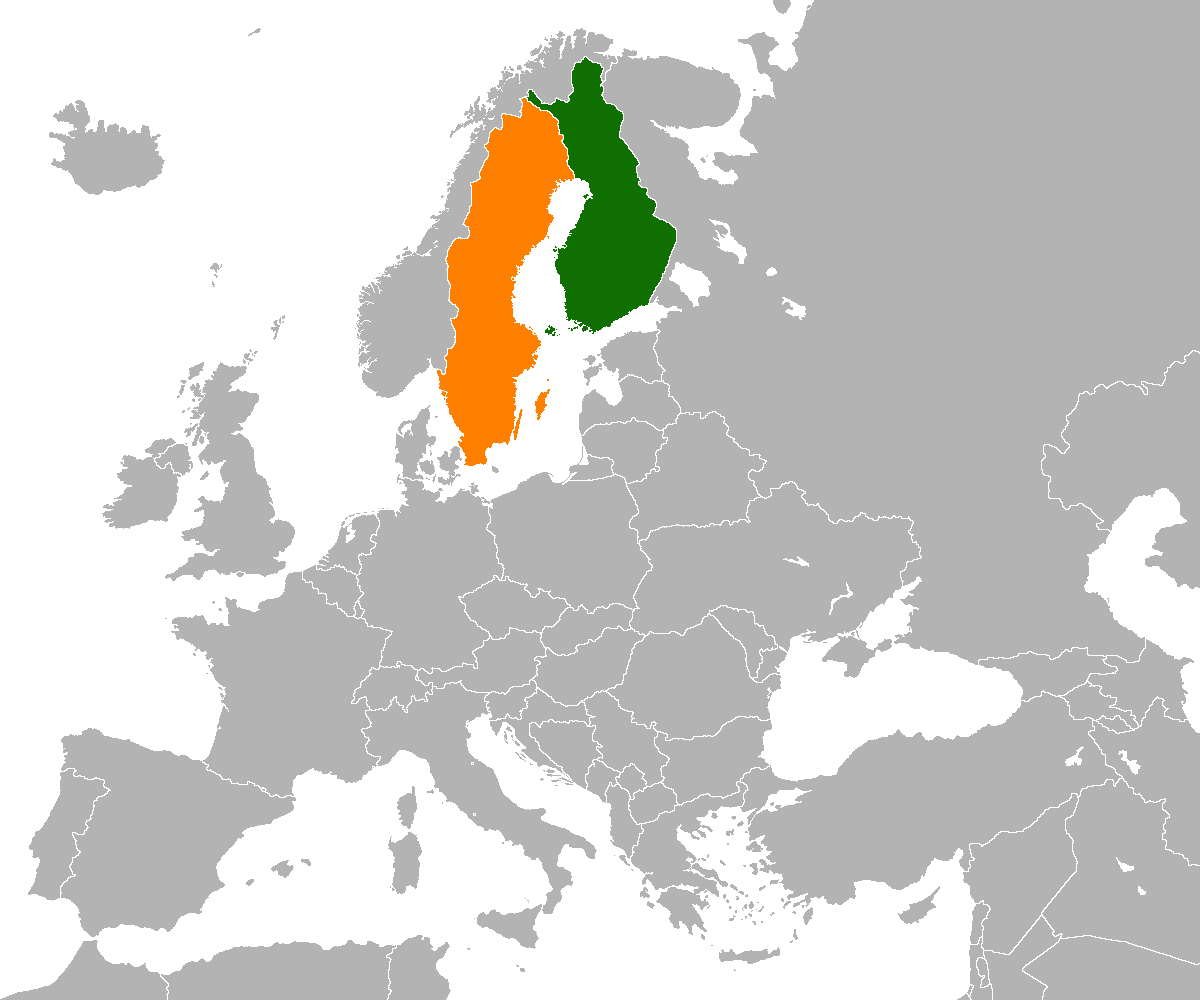
- Finland: Sweden

Diplomatic mission
- Embassy of Finland, Stockholm: Embassy of Sweden, Helsinki

Envoy
- Ambassador Liisa Talonpoika: Ambassador Nicola Clase

Finland and Sweden share a long history, similar legal systems, and an economic and social model. Finland was an integral part of Sweden for almost 700 years from around 1150 until the Finnish War of 1809 after which Finland became an autonomous part of the Russian Empire as the Grand Duchy of Finland. Since Finland gained its full independence from Russia in 1917, Finland and Sweden have been close partners, enjoying a special relationship. The number of Finnish-Swedish connections and the quality of cooperation in most areas of the government is unique when compared to other international relations involving both countries. The Swedish language has an official status in Finland, whilst Finns form the largest ethnic minority in Sweden, estimated to be about 675,000.

Relationships are maintained at the highest political level on a regular basis, and interactions between public authorities and civil society are very strong. New elements of the special relationship are the official minority language status that the Finnish language received in Sweden, as well as the business integration between the two countries.

Finland and Sweden joined the European Union together in 1995. Following the Russian invasion of Ukraine in February 2022, both countries applied to join NATO together in May of that year. Russia stopped its electricity export to Finland, with Finland electing to import from Sweden as a result. Finland became a member of NATO on 4 April 2023 and Sweden became a member of NATO on 7 March 2024.

Finland has an embassy in Stockholm, consulate general in Gothenburg and 21 consulates in Borlänge, Borås, Eskilstuna, Gävle, Haparanda, Halmstad, Karlshamn, Karlskoga, Karlstad, Landskrona, Luleå, Malmö, Norrköping, Oskarshamn, Skellefteå, Sundsvall, Trollhättan, Uppsala, Umeå, Visby and Västerås. Sweden has an embassy in Helsinki, consulate general in Mariehamn, and 17 consulates in Joensuu, Jyväskylä, Kokkola, Kotka, Kuopio, Lahti, Lappeenranta, Mikkeli, Oulu, Jakobstad, Pori, Raseborg, Rovaniemi, Tampere, Tornio, Turku and Vaasa.

On a larger scale, both Finland and Sweden also share a special relationship with the other Nordic countries: Denmark, Iceland and Norway, and these five countries are members of the Nordic Council. In addition to the European Union and NATO, both countries are full members of the Council of Europe, the Organization for Security and Co-operation in Europe, and the Joint Expeditionary Force.

== History ==
=== Viking period and Swedish crusades ===
Contact between what is now Sweden and what is now Finland was considerable even during pre-Christian times. The Vikings were known to Finns due to both their participation in commerce and their plundering. There is evidence of possible Viking settlements on the Finnish mainland.

During the 11th and 12th centuries, Sweden gradually became a unified Christian kingdom. According to the archaeological finds, Christianity first gained a foothold in Finland during the 11th century as well. Later medieval legends describe Swedish attempts to conquer and 'Christianize' Finland by the First Swedish Crusade sometime in the mid-1150s. In the early 13th century, Bishop Thomas became the first bishop of Finland. There were several secular powers who aimed to bring Finland under their rule but the Swedish regent Birger Jarl established Swedish rule in Finland through the Second Swedish Crusade, which is most often dated at 1249.

=== Middle Ages ===
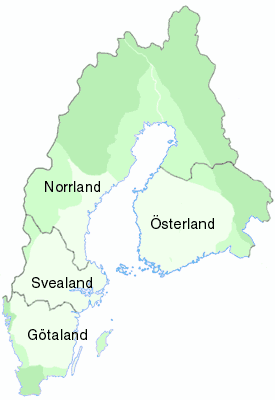
The traditional lands of Sweden (different stages of expansion marked by shades. Borders as of year 1700)

Finland gradually became an integrated and important part of Sweden. Finland became known as Österland, and its main urban settlement evolved in Åbo (Turku). Åbo was one of the biggest towns in the kingdom of Sweden, and its population included German merchants and craftsmen. Otherwise the degree of urbanization was very low in medieval Finland. During the 12th and 13th centuries, great numbers of Swedish settlers moved to the southern and north-western coasts of Finland, including Åland and the archipelago between Åbo and the Åland Islands. In these regions, the Swedish language is widely spoken even today. Swedish came to be the language of the high-status people in many other parts of Finland as well.

In 1362, representatives from Finland were called to participate in the elections for king of Sweden. That year is often held to signify the incorporation of Finland into the kingdom of Sweden. As in the Scandinavian part of the kingdom, a gentry or (lower) nobility consisted of magnates and yeomen who could afford armament for a man and a horse. These were concentrated in the southern part of Finland.

After the Black Death and internal power struggles in Sweden, Queen Margaret I of Denmark united the Nordic countries in the Union of Kalmar in 1397, with the approval of the Swedish nobility. Finland was sometimes involved in these struggles, but in general the 15th century seems to have been a relatively prosperous time, characterized by population growth and economic development. Towards the end of the 15th century, however, the situation on the eastern border was becoming more tense. The Principality of Moscow conquered Novgorod, preparing the way for a unified Russia, and soon tensions arose with Sweden. In 1495–1497, a war between Sweden and Russia was fought. The fortress-town of Viborg stood against a Russian siege.

=== Vasa era and Cudgel War ===
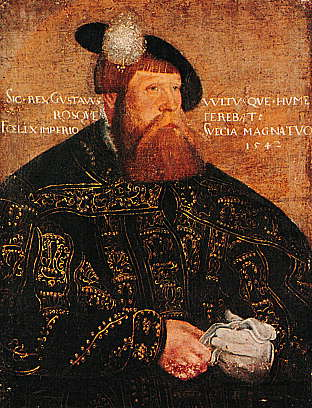
Gustav I portrayed in 1542 by Jakob Bincks

In 1521, the Kalmar Union collapsed and Gustav Vasa became the King of Sweden. During his rule, the Swedish church was reformed. The state administration underwent extensive reforms and development too, giving it a much stronger grip on the life of local communities as well as the ability to collect higher taxes. Following the policies of the Reformation, in 1551, Mikael Agricola, bishop of Åbo, published his translation of the New Testament into the Finnish language. In 1550, Helsinki was founded by Gustav Vasa under the name of Helsingfors, but remained little more than a fishing village for more than two centuries.

King Gustav Vasa died in 1560 and his crown was passed to his three sons in separate turns. The common people of Finland suffered during this period because of drafts, high taxes, and abuse by military personnel. This resulted in the Cudgel War of 1596–1597, a desperate peasant rebellion, which was suppressed brutally and bloodily. A peace treaty (the Treaty of Teusina) with Russia in 1595 moved the border of Finland further to the east and north, very roughly where the modern border lies.

An important part of the 16th-century history of Finland was growth of the area settled by the farming population. Farmers from the province of Savonia settled the vast wilderness regions in Middle Finland, and the original Sami population often had to leave. Some of the wilderness settled was traditional hunting and fishing territory of Karelian hunters. During the 1580s, this resulted in a bloody guerrilla warfare between the Finnish settlers and Karelians in some regions, especially in Ostrobothnia.

=== 19th century ===
In 1809, Sweden lost Finland and Åland to Russia after the Finnish War.

=== Independence ===
In 1917, Finland declared independence, during World War I. Sweden recognized the independence, but required the Åland Islands to become part of Sweden. During the Finnish Civil War, in 1918 Sweden occupied Åland. The League of Nations solved the dispute by not changing the border, but requiring Swedish to remain the spoken language of Åland.

=== World War II ===
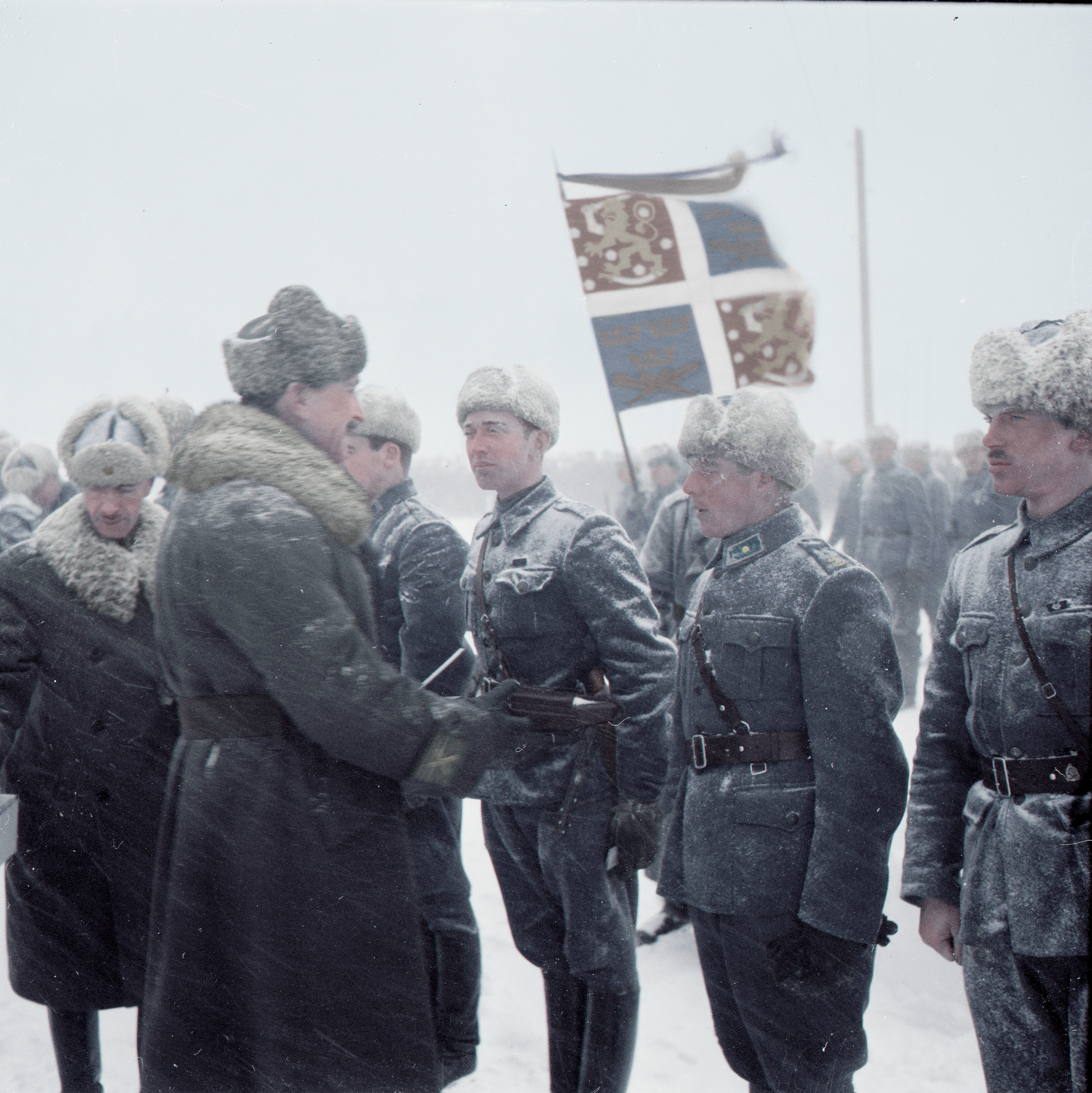
Field Marshal Mannerheim greeting members of the Swedish Volunteer Battalion in Hanko, Finland, 1941

During World War II Sweden declared its neutrality, but in the Winter War it declared itself non-belligerent and supported Finland's cause to a limited extent. This included over 8,000 Swedish army and air force volunteers. Sweden also accepted and cared for a host of Finnish war children during World War II. After the war, Sweden had a clear headstart in the post-war economical development, much due to its neutrality in the war.

After the Winter War, Finland sought guarantees against renewed Soviet aggression. In spring 1940 public discussion in both Finland and Sweden turned toward the idea of a Nordic defensive alliance, which was also supported in Norway. Although the Soviet Union initially made no objections, it soon condemned the proposal as a "military revanche" directed against the Moscow Peace Treaty of March 1940, warning that such a pact would violate the treaty and endanger Finland's independence. The idea was accordingly dropped, as both Helsinki and Stockholm wished to avoid provoking Moscow.

In summer and autumn 1940, Finland and Sweden once again explored closer cooperation. Swedish foreign minister Christian Günther advanced the idea of a political federation with Finland. The plan went beyond a mere defensive alliance: Sweden also wanted to ensure control over Finland's foreign policy, fearing that the revanchist elements in Finland might seek to regain the lost territories. The Finnish government responded favorably, though doubts persisted about Sweden's reliability. Both the Soviet Union and Nazi Germany opposed the project, and by late 1940 the federation plan was abandoned.

In September 1944, Finland relocated elements of its signals intelligence capabilities to Sweden as part of Operation Stella Polaris, allowing Sweden access to intercepted Soviet communications in exchange for security in the event of a renewed Soviet invasion of Finland.

=== Post-war era ===
King Carl XVI Gustaf of Sweden meets with Finnish President Urho Kekkonen, 1974

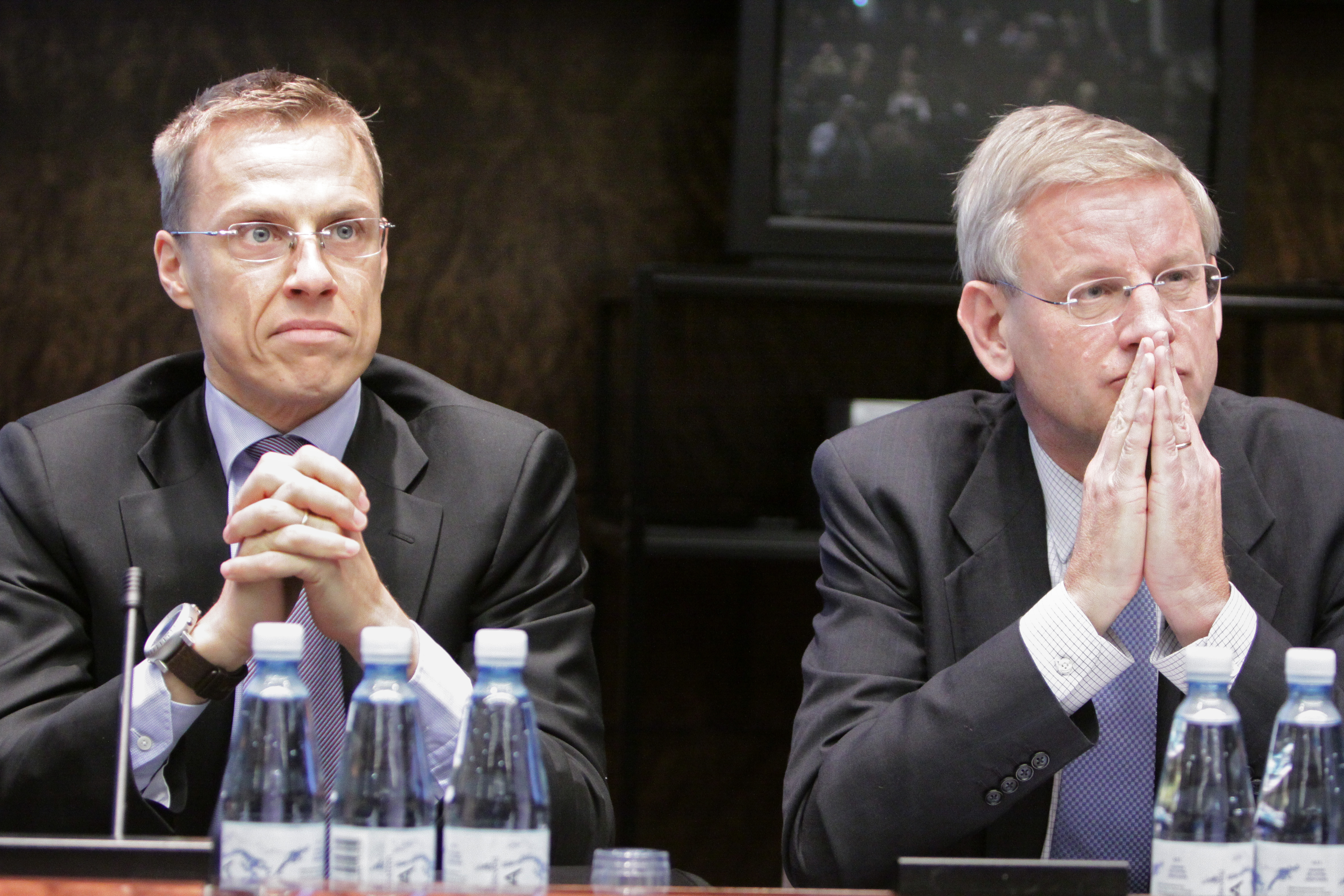
Alexander Stubb with Carl Bildt in 2008

In 1995, both Sweden and Finland, alongside Austria, acceded to the European Union.

It is an old tradition for the first official foreign visit of a new prime minister from either country to visit the other. However, in June 2014, the newly elected Finnish prime minister Alexander Stubb broke with tradition and made his first official visit abroad to Estonia. His successor Antti Rinne also made his first official visit to Estonia but Juha Sipilä and Sanna Marin both made their first official visit to Sweden.

Finland and Sweden co-hosted the Ice Hockey World Championships in 2012 and 2013.

In 2014, the two countries announced a bilateral special defense partnership.

As the COVID-19 pandemic hit Europe, Finland and Sweden responded to it in differing ways. Sweden implemented generally laxer restrictions while Finland closed its borders among other things. This is due to the countries' differing histories: Finland's traumatic experiences during World War II have left their mark on Finnish society and the country has thus maintained a larger preparedness for crisis, whereas Sweden cut back on its preparedness after the end of the Cold War and decided to use the funds for other purposes. What, if any, impact this will have on official state relations is unclear, but officials in both countries have had to comment on public concerns relating to Finnish–Swedish relations in the countries' media outlets.

Kvarken Bridge is a proposed bridge between Sweden and Finland across the strait of Kvarken as a part of the European route E12.

== NATO ==
Historically, both countries maintained neutrality and did not pursue NATO membership. However, in response to the 2022 Russian invasion of Ukraine, the two countries formally applied for NATO membership on 18 May, after which Turkey blocked the initiation of the membership processes of the two countries. On 28 June 2022, the two countries signed a tripartite memorandum with Turkey to pave the way for their accession to NATO, and the membership processes of the two countries officially started. Finland officially joined NATO on 4 April 2023, while Sweden joined on 7 March 2024.

== Resident diplomatic missions ==
- Finland has an embassy in Stockholm.
- Sweden has an embassy in Helsinki and a consulate-general in Mariehamn (Åland).
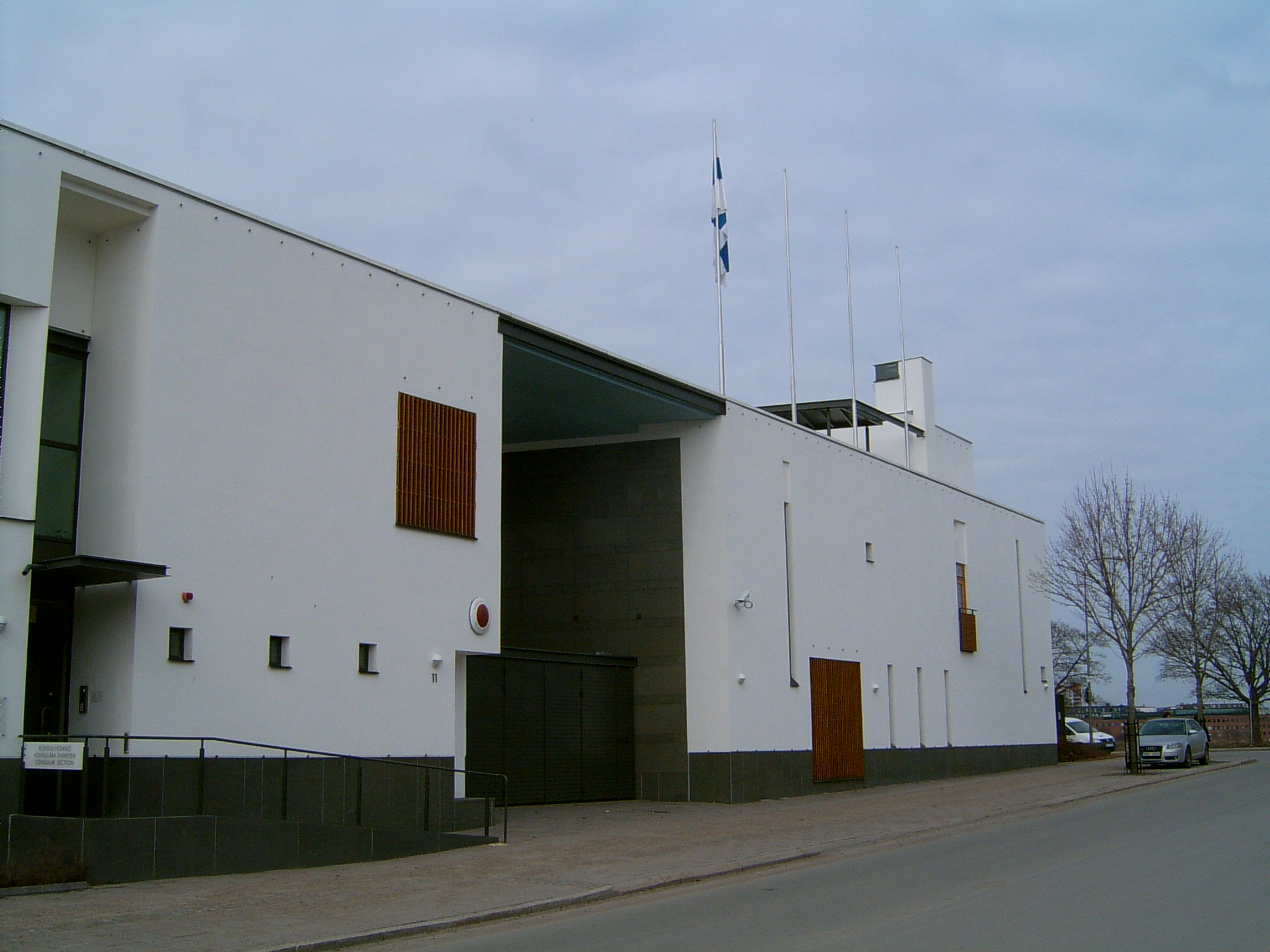
Embassy of Finland in Stockholm

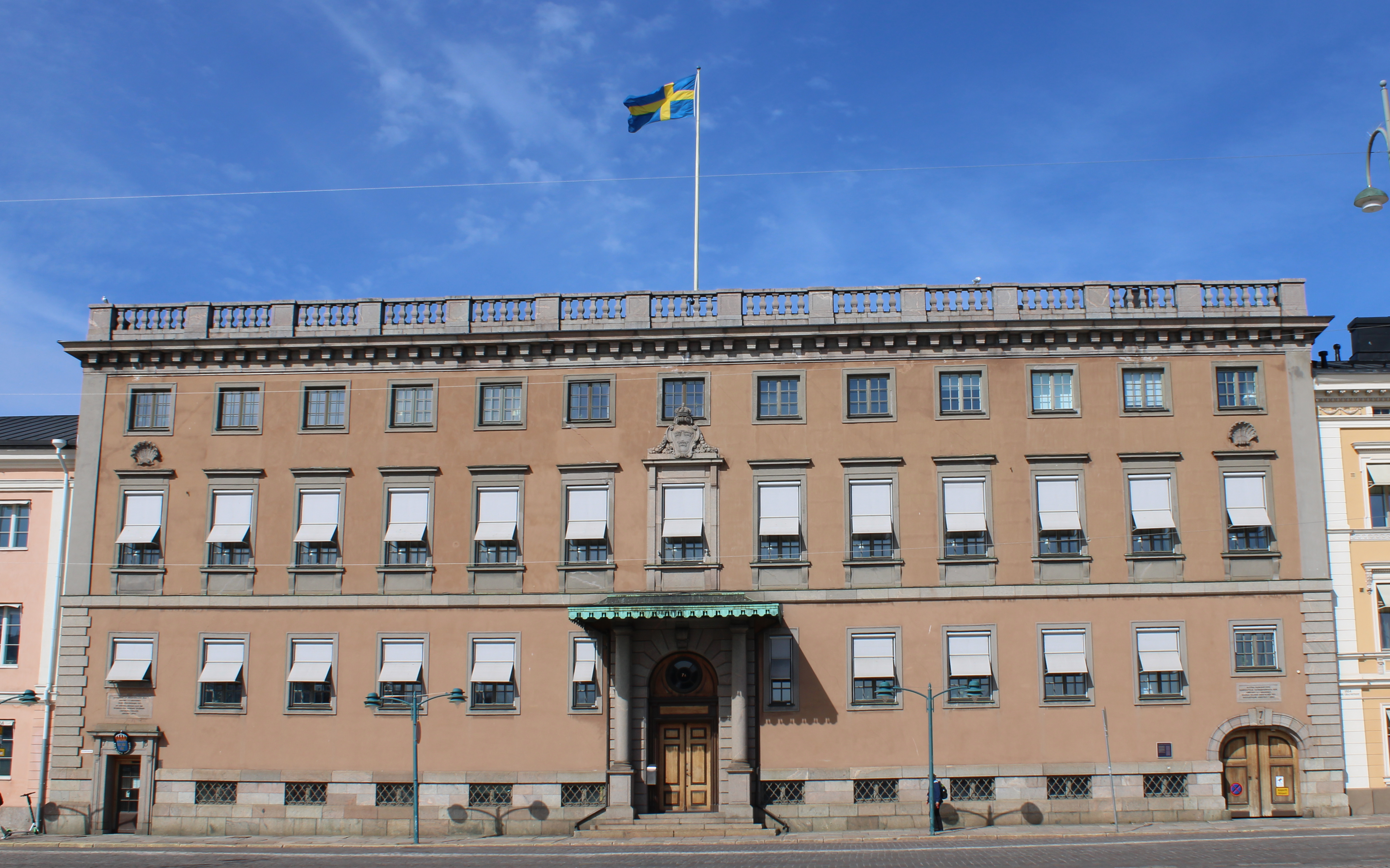
Embassy of Sweden in Helsinki

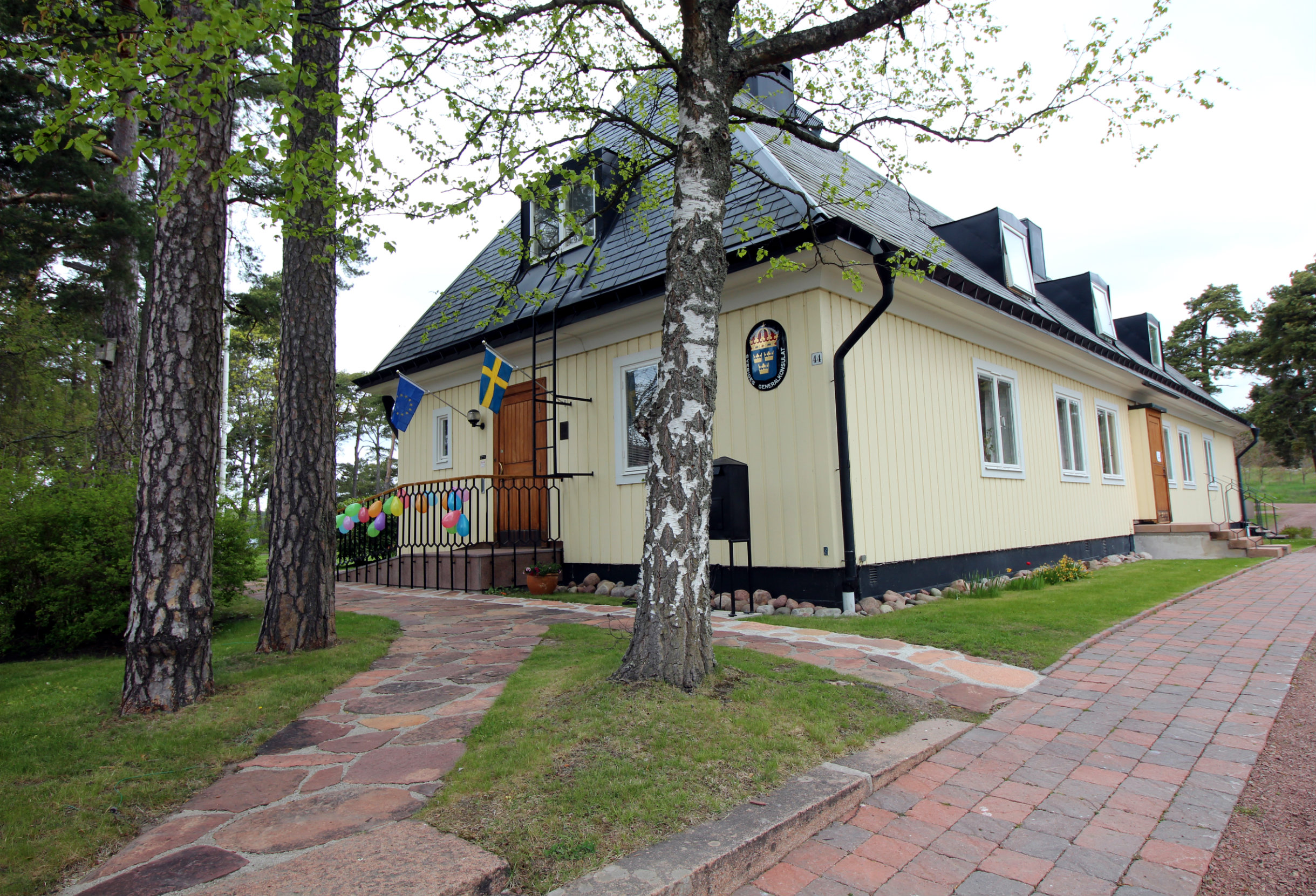
Consulate-General of Sweden in Mariehamn

== See also ==
- Foreign relations of Finland
- Foreign relations of Sweden
- Finland–Sweden border
- Sweden Finns
- Finnish Swedes
- List of ambassadors of Finland to Sweden
- List of ambassadors of Sweden to Finland
- 1995 enlargement of the European Union
- Neutral and Non-Aligned European States
