= Forma Finlandia =

International plastics design competition

Forma Finlandia was an international plastics design competition arranged by the Finnish oil company Neste between 1986 and 1994. It was created to support Neste’s corporate image objectives and to promote the acceptance of plastics as material and the environmental awareness related to the use of plastics.

The contest was arranged three times: in 1986–1987, 1989–1991, and 1992–1994.

The first Forma Finlandia 1986–1987 celebrated the 75th anniversary of the Finnish industrial design organisation Ornamo. The contest was open to everyone but required that the entries be new and previously unpublished designs. In 1989, the first prize was given to American designer Lisa Krohn for her design for a multi-functional telephone.

In 1989–1991 and 1992–1994 the contest was arranged in two main categories, one for new product ideas and their designers, and the second category for existing products and their manufacturers. In 1991, no Grand Prize was given and the second prize was divided between two German entries, the Metropolis set of hifi audio equipment by workgroup Meta-Moderne (Wolfgang Hein, Volker Dowidat and Bernard Neelen) and an experimental three-wheeler Lizard by Julian Pahlow. The corporate category winner was a MIDI saxophone for Yamaha, designed by Yasuhiro Kira. Other award recipients in 1991 included Hans-Uwe Baumann, Peter Stenlund, Corinne Chiapello, Loic Perois, Renate Eilert, Eric Chan, Philip Bro Ludvigsen, Hertha Baeumer, and Bernard Sams.

Winners in the third Forma Finlandia contest in 1987 included Winfried Scheuer, Giulio and Valerio Vinaccia, Matti Kähönen, Vlad Müller, Cyrille Veau, Willi Gangl, Alfred Urleb, and Christian Werner.
