= Tarjanne (surname) =

Tarjanne is a Finnish surname. Notable people with the surname include:

- Pekka Tarjanne (1937–2010), Finnish scientist and politician
- Päivö Tarjanne (1903–1989), Finnish diplomat

== See also ==
- Tarjanne, a lake in Finland
