= Katja Pehrman =

Finland's Human Rights Ambassador

Katja Pehrman is a Finnish diplomat currently serving as Finland's Ambassador for Human Rights. She was appointed to the role in November 2024.

Perhman joined the Ministry for Foreign Affairs in 2002.

She has worked at the Ministry of Foreign Affairs' Political Department in various positions, including the Head of the Department and the Under Secretary of State. Perhman also served as Foreign Minister Erkki Tuomioja's diplomatic assistant and cabinet manager.

From 2013 to 2017, Perhman served as Finnish Ambassador to the OSCE, where she chaired the Human Dimension Committee from 2016. She has worked, in particular, on security policy issues, including in the arms control unit.

From 2017 to 2024, she served as Senior Advisor and Focal Point for Women in the United Nations System at UN Women

In her past assignments at the Finnish Ministry of Foreign Affairs, Pehrman has worked at the Finnish Permanent Representation to the United Nations in New York, has served during Finland's EU presidency, and in the Finnish Permanent Mission of the OSCE in Vienna. During the Finnish OSCE presidency, she served as chairman of the OSCE's Budget and Management Committee.
