= Peter Stenlund =

Finnish diplomat

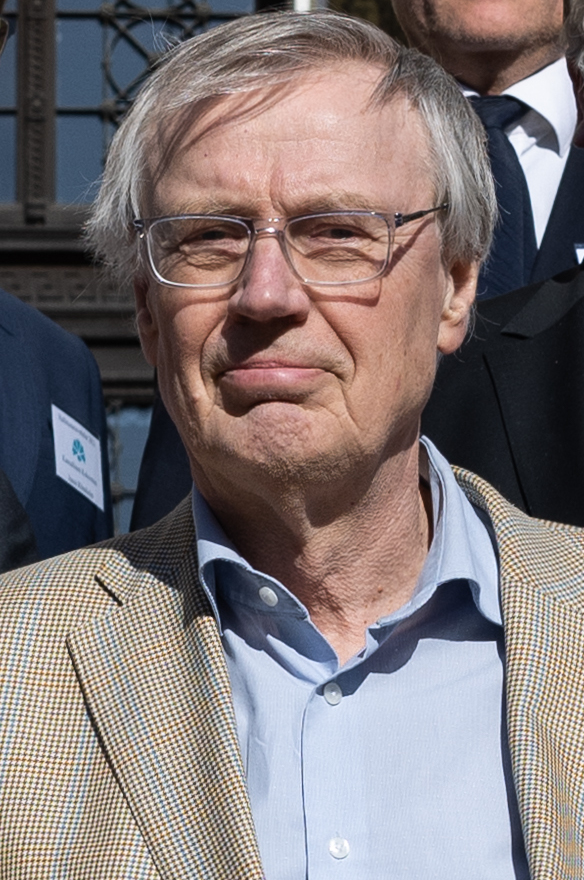
Peter Stenlund, 2023

Karl Peter Stenlund (born 13 February 1951) is a Finnish civil servant and a diplomat. He served as Secretary of State for the Ministry of Foreign Affairs of Finland since 1 March 2014, after Pertti Torstila's retirement, until February 2018.

Stenlund is a Master of Political Sciences from the University of Helsinki (1980). Between 1976 and 1981 he worked as editor-in-chief of Svensk Presstjänst and as Swedish People's Party's party secretary and in 1981–1995.

Stenlund was employed by the Ministry for Foreign Affairs in 1995. He worked as a Special Assistant to the European Minister in 1995, as Head of the Nordic Co-operation Secretariat and Deputy Minister for Co-operation 1996–1998 and as Consultative Officer 1998–2003. In the Foreign Service, Stenlund has worked as Minister at the Embassy of Finland in Stockholm 2003–2005 and Ambassador of Finland to Norway 2006–2010.

Prior to his appointment as Secretary of State, Stenlund served as Under Secretary of State for Internal and External Services of the Ministry of Foreign Affairs between March 2010 and February 2014.

Stenlund was born in Siipyy. He is married and has two children.
