= Wilhelm Breitenstein =

Finnish diplomat (1933–2005)

Frederik Wilhelm Breitenstein (17 May 1933 Tampere – 6 June 2005 Helsinki) was a Finnish diplomat and ambassador and Permanent Representative of Finland to the United Nations from 1991 to 1998.

He was Master of Law from the University of Helsinki. From 1968 to 1972 he was Deputy Permanent Representative of Finland to the European Free Trade Association (EFTA) in Geneva and in 1972 he was appointed Minister Counsellor and Deputy Permanent Representative of Finland to the United Nations in New York. In 1978, he was head of the Development Cooperation Department in the Ministry for Foreign Affairs in Helsinki. He was ambassador to OSCE from 1983 to 1991.

After retiring, he served as adviser to the UN's "Food for Oil" program.
