= Svenska normallyceum i Helsingfors =

School in Helsinki, Findland

Svenska normallyceum
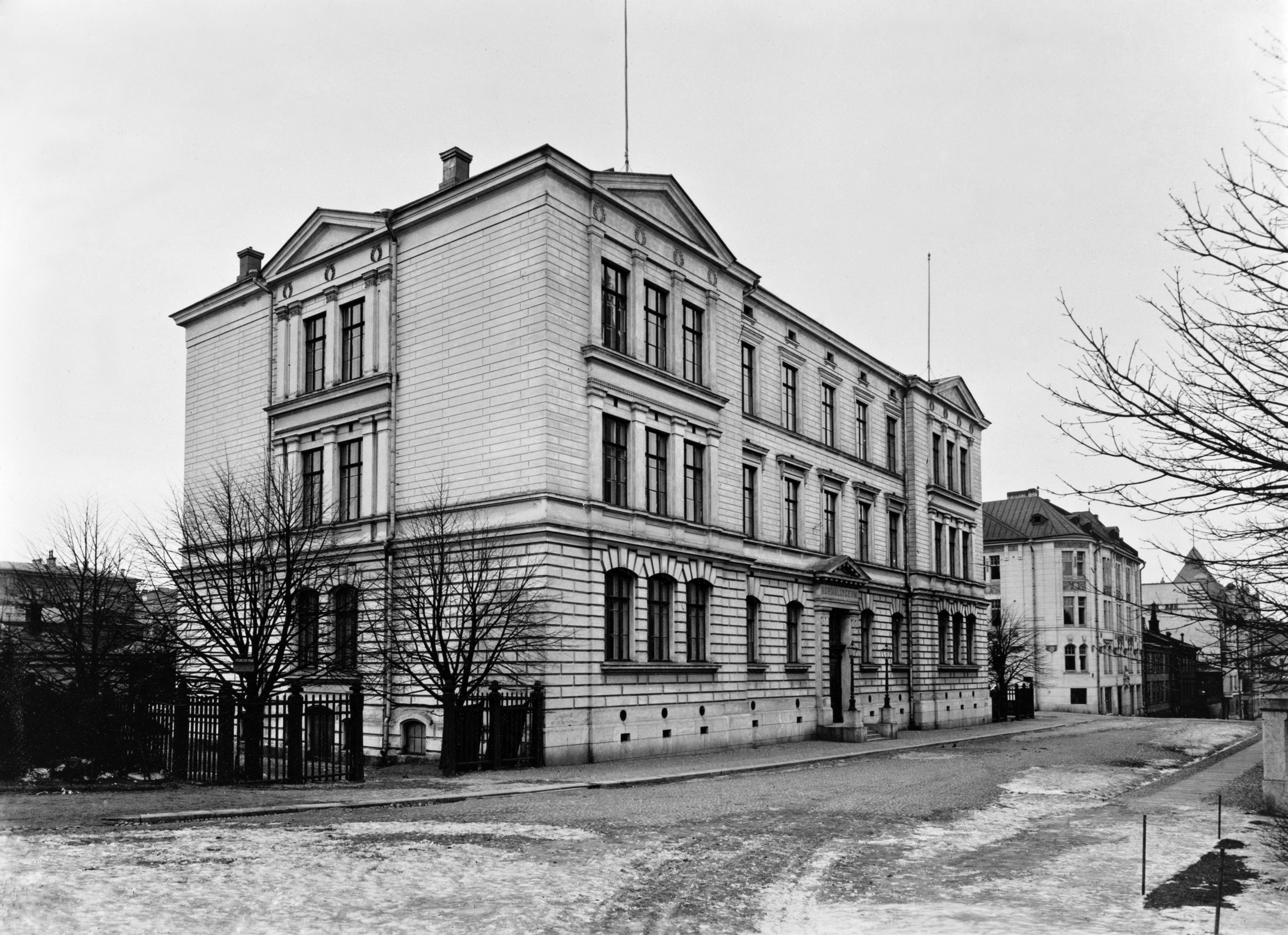

Location
- Helsinki; Finland
- Coordinates: 60.1633°N 24.9512°E

Information
- School type: Lyceum
- Founded: 1864
- Closed: 1977

Svenska normallyceum i Helsingfors (Norsen) was a Swedish-language school in the Kaartinkaupunki district of Helsinki between 1864 and 1977. The school was only for boys until 1974 when it became a co-educational school.

== History ==
Svenska normallyceum was established on the initiative of Johan Vilhelm Snellman in 1864. The school was initially called Helsingfors normalskola, but the name was changed in 1874. As a normal school, Norsen offered prospective teachers auscultation opportunities, which is why it included both classical and realschule education. Between 1867 and 1872 the school had a department for Finnish-speaking students.

The school was located on Aleksanterinkatu 6 for the first few years and then on Kasarmikatu 48 between 1867 and 1878. Norsen was then temporarily located in a rented facility at Ratakatu 2, while a new school building designed by architect Axel Hampus Dahlström was being built. In 1880 the school moved to the new building on Unioninkatu 2, where it remained.

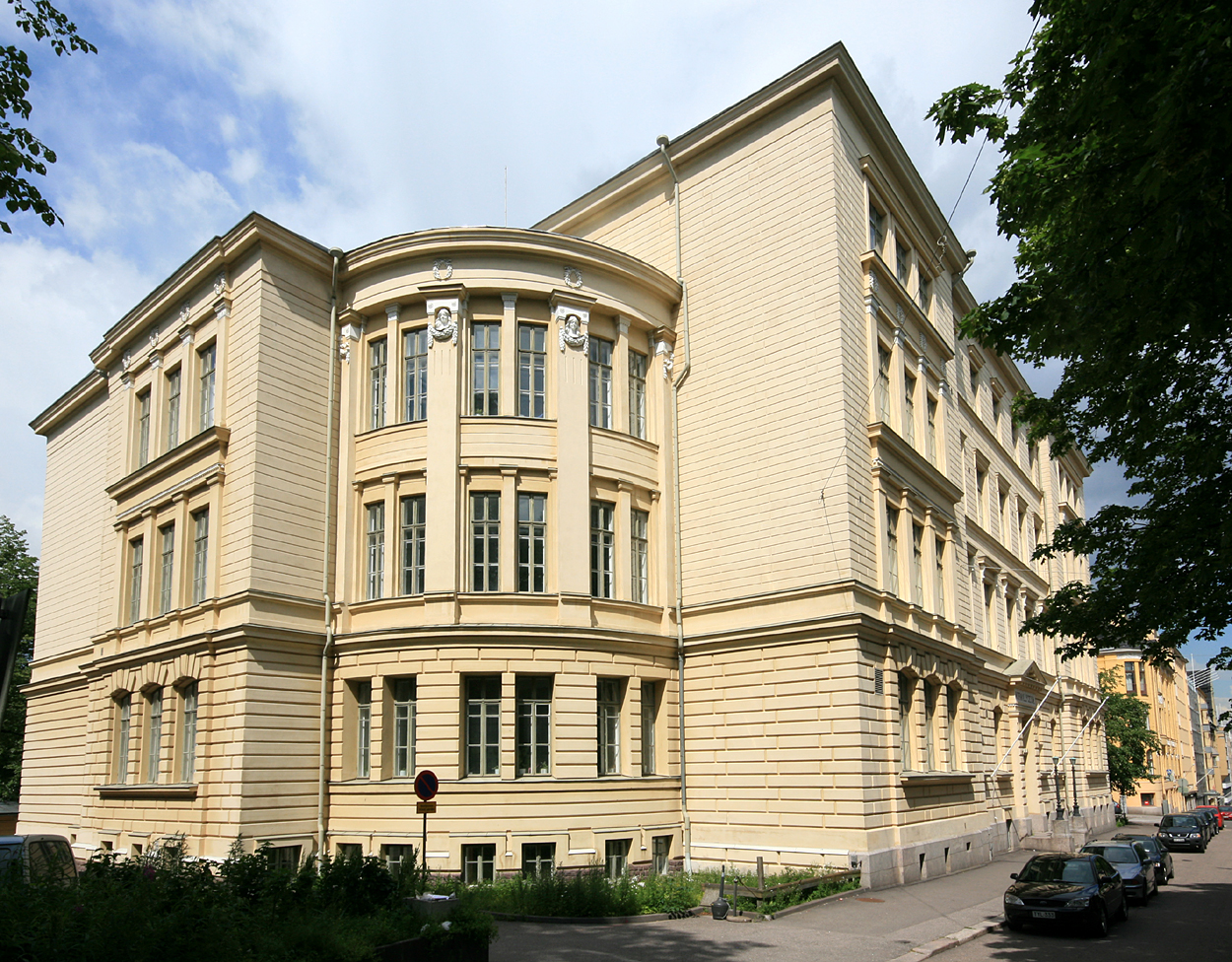
Svenska Normallyceum i Helsingfors

Norsen was a boys' school until 1974 when it was merged with the girls' school Svenska Flicklyceet i Helsingfors and formed a co-educational school. In 1977 the school was split into the högstadium Högstadieskolan Svenska normallyceum and the gymnasium Ottelinska Gymnasiet, now Gymnasiet Svenska normallyceum.

== Famous alumni ==
- Alec Aalto, diplomat
- Hans Blomberg, electrical engineer
- Bo Carpelan, author
- Adolf Ehrnrooth, general who served during the Winter and Continuation wars
- Einar Englund, composer
- Jörn Donner, author, director, producer, journalist, politician
- Ragnar Granit, scientist awarded the Nobel Prize in Physiology or Medicine in 1967
- Christian Grönroos, Professor of Service and Relationship Marketing at Hanken
- Harry Helenius, diplomat
- Gustav Hägglund, Commander in Chief of Finnish Armed Forces
- Jan-Magnus Jansson, politician, Professor of general state science
- Erik Kruskopf, art critic, art historian, writer
- Börje Lampenius, actor, director
- Magnus Lindberg, composer, pianist
- Claus Montonen, theoretical physicist
- Leif Segerstam, conductor, composer, violinist, violist, pianist
- Leif Sevón, lawyer, judge
- Hjalmar Siilasvuo, militar
- Mikael Sundman, architect
- Linus Torvalds, creator of the Linux kernel
- Georg Henrik von Wright, philosopher, professor, member of Academy of Finland
- Benedict Zilliacus, journalist
- Wilhelm Wahlforss, industrialist, engineer
- Karl August Wrede, architect, civil servant

== Headmasters ==
- Julius Efraim Bergroth 1864-1870
- Alfred Kihlman 1871-1895
- Carl Johan Lindeqvist 1896-1900
- Vilhelm Theodor Rosenqvist 1900-1918
