= Klaus Törnudd =

Finnish diplomat and researcher (1931–2026)

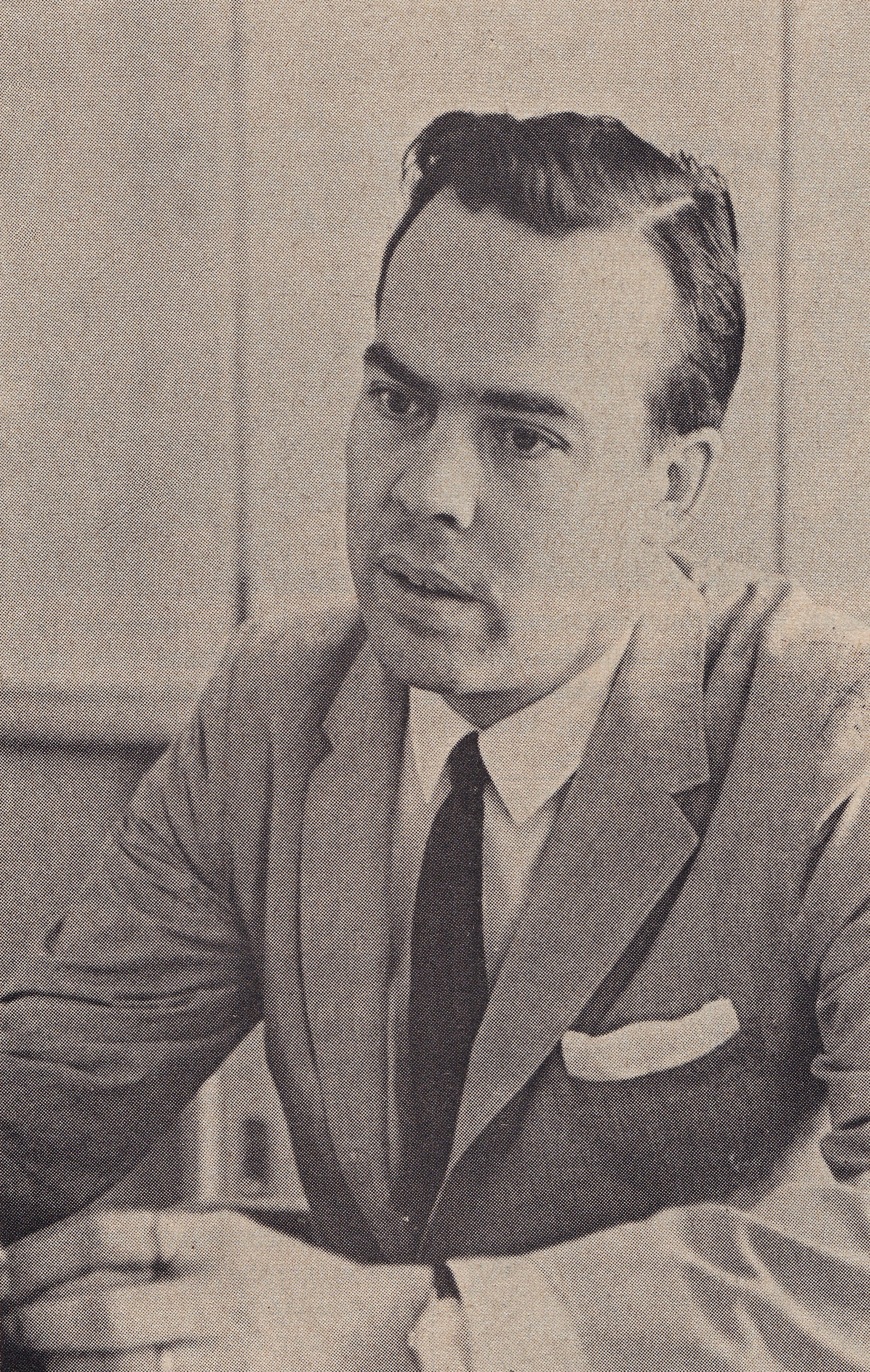
Törnudd in 1968

Klaus Mattias Törnudd (26 December 1931 – 17 August 2026) was a Finnish diplomat and researcher in politics and international politics. He was a professor and ambassador for political science.

Törnudd's parents were the translator Allan Viktor Törnudd and Helene Margareta Niininen, a child care inspector who became known as a writer. He belongs to his father's side of the Törnudd family.

== Education and early career ==
Törnudd graduated from Svenska Lyceum in Helsinki in 1949, graduated from the University of Helsinki in 1956 and graduated as a PhD in 1961 from a non-military subject Soviet Attitude towards Non-Military Regional Co-operation. He had been employed by the Finnish Ministry for Foreign Affairs since 1958. Between 1961 and 1964, he was Assistant and Second Secretary of the United Nations Office in New York.

Törnudd served as Secretary of State for 1964–1966 in Cairo and then as the Deputy Secretary for Foreign Affairs of the Year. Between 1967 and 1971 he was a professor of international politics at the University of Tampere.

However, he returned to the diplomatic circle, initially for two years as a secretary in Moscow.

== Special Representative ==
Between 1973 and 1974, he worked at the Special Representative for the OSCE project in Geneva and then at the Political Department of the Ministry of Foreign Affairs, head of which he served in 1977–1981.

During this time, the department was particularly active in defending Finland's neutrality in relation to the Soviet Union. From fall 1981 to January 1983, Törnudd was on leave from the Ministry and was responsible for the Swedish-speaking general professorship of the University of Helsinki. He was also a docent of General Political Science at the same university in the years 1975–1996.

== Political Under-Secretary ==
Between 1983 and 1988, Törnudd served as Political Under-Secretary of State at the Ministry for Foreign Affairs and from 1988 to 1991 as Permanent Representative of Finland to the United Nations.

After two years in office as a negotiating officer, he served as the Ambassador of the Republic of France in 1993–1996 before retiring from his diplomatic career. He still aspired to the European Parliament as a candidate for the Swedish People's Party but was not elected.

== Diplomacy ==
Much of Törnudd's scientific production dealt with multilateral diplomacy and the United Nations. Security policy and human rights issues were also subjects of importance to him. He also wrote parts of the series of publications dealing with the history of the Government and Parliament.

Törnudd also had many domestic and international positions of trust. He was chairman of the Finnish OSCE Committee in 1977–1981 and Chairman of the Board of the Peace and Conflict Research Institute in 1978–1982. In the 1980s, he led some international working groups devising nuclear non-proliferation zones.

== Death ==
Törnudd died on 17 August 2026, at the age of 94.
