= Kirsti Lintonen =

Finnish diplomat (born 1945)

Kirsti Lintonen (born May 23, 1945 in Tampere) is a former Permanent Representative of Finland to the United Nations who served for the period 2005–2009. She presented her credentials to United Nations Secretary-General Kofi Annan on February 15, 2005. Kirsti Lintonen possesses a master's degree in political science and entered the Finnish Ministry for Foreign Affairs in 1971. She became an ambassador in Windhoek, Namibia in 1990. In 1994 she became the Deputy Director General for Political Affairs within the Ministry, and in 1996 she became Under-Secretary of State. From 2000 until her appointment to the UN, she had been Finland's ambassador to South Africa, Botswana, Lesotho, Mauritius, Namibia, and Swaziland. She was accredited to the Southern African Development Community.
