= Kai Sauer =

Finnish diplomat (born 1967)

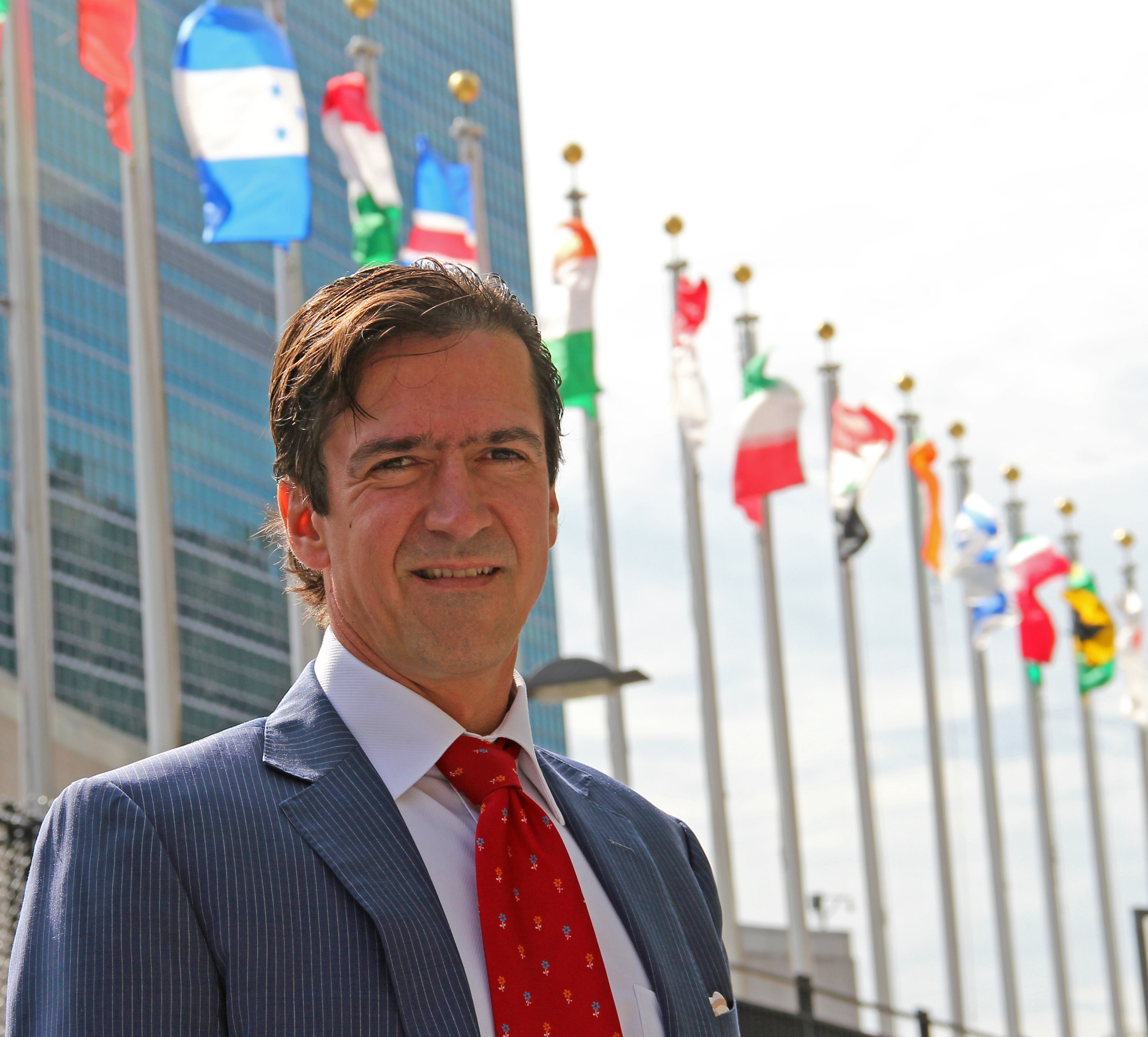
- Kai Sauer at UN HQ

Ambassador of the Embassy of Finland to Germany
- Incumbent
- Assumed office September 2023
- Preceded by: Anne Sipiläinen

Personal details
- Born: 3 March 1967 (age 59) Hamburg, West Germany
- Spouse: Erika Sauer
- Education: Master of Social Sciences, University of Tampere
- Alma mater: University of Tampere
- Profession: Diplomat
- Website: https://www.um.fi/en

Military service
- Rank: Corporal

Kai Jürgen Mikael Sauer (born 3 March 1967, Hamburg, West Germany) is a Finnish diplomat. He is the Ambassador of the Embassy of Finland to Germany. Prior to this he served four years as the Under Secretary of State for Foreign and Security Policy at the Ministry for Foreign Affairs of Finland.

== Early life and education ==
Ambassador Sauer was born in Hamburg, West Germany to a German father and a Finnish mother in 1967. In 1995, Sauer graduated from the University of Tampere with a master's degree in Social Sciences majoring in International Relations. He has also studied in Freie Universität Berlin and Hamburg University.

In 2014, the University of Tampere awarded Ambassador Sauer as Alumni of the Year.

== Career ==
Ambassador Sauer began his diplomatic career with the Finnish Foreign Ministry in 1995 working as a Desk Officer for Germany, Austria, Switzerland, United States and Canada in the Political Department.

In 1997, Sauer transferred to the Economic Department to work as a Desk Officer for Cooperation with Adjacent Areas. In 1998, he worked for the Department for Press and Culture as the Desk Officer for Cultural Cooperation.

1998–2000 Sauer served as the Deputy Head of the Embassy of Finland in Zagreb, Croatia.

2000–2003 Sauer worked as the First Secretary of the Permanent Mission of Finland to the United Nations.

2003–2004 Sauer served as a Senior Adviser to the Special Representative of the Secretary General, Mr. Harri Holkeri in the United Nations Interim Administration Mission in Kosovo (UNMIK). 2004–2005 Sauer worked as the Head of the Strategic Analysis and Research Unit in UNMIK.

In 2005, Sauer was appointed as the Director of the Unit for the Western Balkans, in the Ministry for Foreign Affairs of Finland.

2005–2007 Sauer worked as a Senior Adviser to the Special Representative of the UN Secretary General, former President of the Republic of Finland, Martti Ahtisaari who led the UN-facilitated Kosovo future status process and the UN Office of the Special Envoy for Kosovo (UNOSEK) in Vienna, Austria.

2007–2010 Sauer worked as the Director of the Unit for UN Affairs in the Ministry for Foreign Affairs.

In 2010 Sauer was appointed as the Ambassador of Finland to Indonesia, Timor-Leste and ASEAN (Association of Southeast Asian Nations).

2014–2019, Sauer served as the Permanent Representative of Finland to the United Nations.

2019-2023, Sauer served four years as the Under Secretary of State for Foreign and Security Policy at the Ministry for Foreign Affairs of Finland.

On the 27th of September 2023, Mr. Sauer took up his position as the Ambassador of the Embassy of Finland to Germany.

== Personal life ==
Ambassador Sauer is married to Dr. Erika Sauer with whom he has two adult daughters.

He is an active ice hockey player, scuba diver and runner. Sauer has run several marathons. While serving as the Finnish Ambassador to Indonesia, Sauer won the unofficial ice hockey championship of Indonesia in 2013.

After moving to New York, Ambassador Sauer together with the Permanent Representative of Liechtenstein, Ambassador Christian Wenaweser, founded a running club for the UN ambassadors. In December 2018, the PR runners were featured in the New York Times.

== Honors ==
- Commander, Order of the Lion of Finland (2019)
- Knight, First Class, Order of the Lion of Finland (2007)
- Alumni of the Year, University of Tampere (2014)
- Doctor of Humane Letters (h.c.), Northland College, Wisconsin, USA (2019)
- Military rank: Corporal
