= Jorma Rissanen =

Finnish information theorist (1932–2020)

Jorma Johannes Rissanen
- Born: October 20, 1932; Pielisjärvi (now Lieksa), Finland
- Died: May 9, 2020 (aged 87); Los Gatos, California, United States
- Education: Helsinki University of Technology
- Known for: arithmetic coding and the minimum description length principle
- Awards: IEEE Richard W. Hamming Medal (1993); Claude E. Shannon Award (2009)
- Scientific career
- Fields: Information Theory
- Workplaces: IBM; Linköping University; Tampere University of Technology
- Doctoral advisor: Hans Blomberg

Jorma Johannes Rissanen (October 20, 1932 – May 9, 2020) was an information theorist, known for originating the minimum description length (MDL) principle and practical approaches to arithmetic coding for lossless data compression. His work inspired the development of the theory of stochastic chains with memory of variable length.

== Education and career ==
Rissanen was born in Pielisjärvi (now Lieksa) in Finland and grew up in Kemi, a border town between Finland and Sweden. He moved to Helsinki and studied at the Helsinki University of Technology, where he obtained his master's degree in electrical engineering in 1956 and licentiate in control theory in 1960. He studied there under Olli Lokki and Hans Blomberg.

Rissanen became an IBM researcher since 1960, first in Stockholm, Sweden, while still a Ph.D. student under Hans Blomberg. Most of his PhD work was done remotely as a result and he received his Ph.D. from the Helsinki University of Technology in 1965 with a topic on adaptive control theory. He then moved to IBM Almaden in San Jose, California and stayed with IBM until his retirement in 2002, with a brief interruption in 1974 as a professor of control theory at Linköping University in Sweden. During that time, he became familiar with the work on algorithmic randomness by Andrey Kolmogorov and Per Martin-Löf, which inspired his work on arithmetic coding and MDL, leading to a stream of ground-breaking publications from the late 1970s to the early 1990s. The work on MDL developed into the more general notions of stochastic complexity (about which he wrote an influential book) and universal coding/modeling. After retirement from IBM, he remained professor emeritus of Tampere University of Technology and a fellow of Helsinki Institute for Information Technology.

== Awards and recognitions ==
He was awarded the IEEE Richard W. Hamming Medal in 1993, an IEEE Golden Jubilee Award for Technological Innovation from the IEEE Information Theory Society in 1998, the Kolmogorov Medal of the University of London in 2006, and the IEEE Claude E. Shannon Award in 2009. A Festschrift collection, which includes an interview and substantial biographical information, was published by the Tampere University of Technology in honor of his 75th birthday.

== Personal life ==
Rissanen married Riitta Åberg in 1956, and they have a son Juhani and a daughter Natasha.

== Bibliography ==
- Rissanen, Jorma (1989). Stochastic complexity in statistical inquiry. Singapore: World Scientific. ISBN 981-238-549-5. OCLC 52854741.
- Cybenko, George; O'Leary, Dianne P.; Rissanen, Jorma, eds. (1999). The mathematics of information coding, extraction, and distribution. New York: Springer. ISBN 0-387-98665-0. OCLC 39922074.
- Rissanen, Jorma (2007). Information and complexity in statistical modeling. New York: Springer. ISBN 978-0-387-68812-1. OCLC 232363255.
- Rissanen, Jorma (2012). Optimal estimation of parameters. Cambridge: Cambridge University Press. ISBN 978-1-139-51850-5. OCLC 796796345.
