= Marjatta Rasi =

Finnish diplomat (1945–2021)

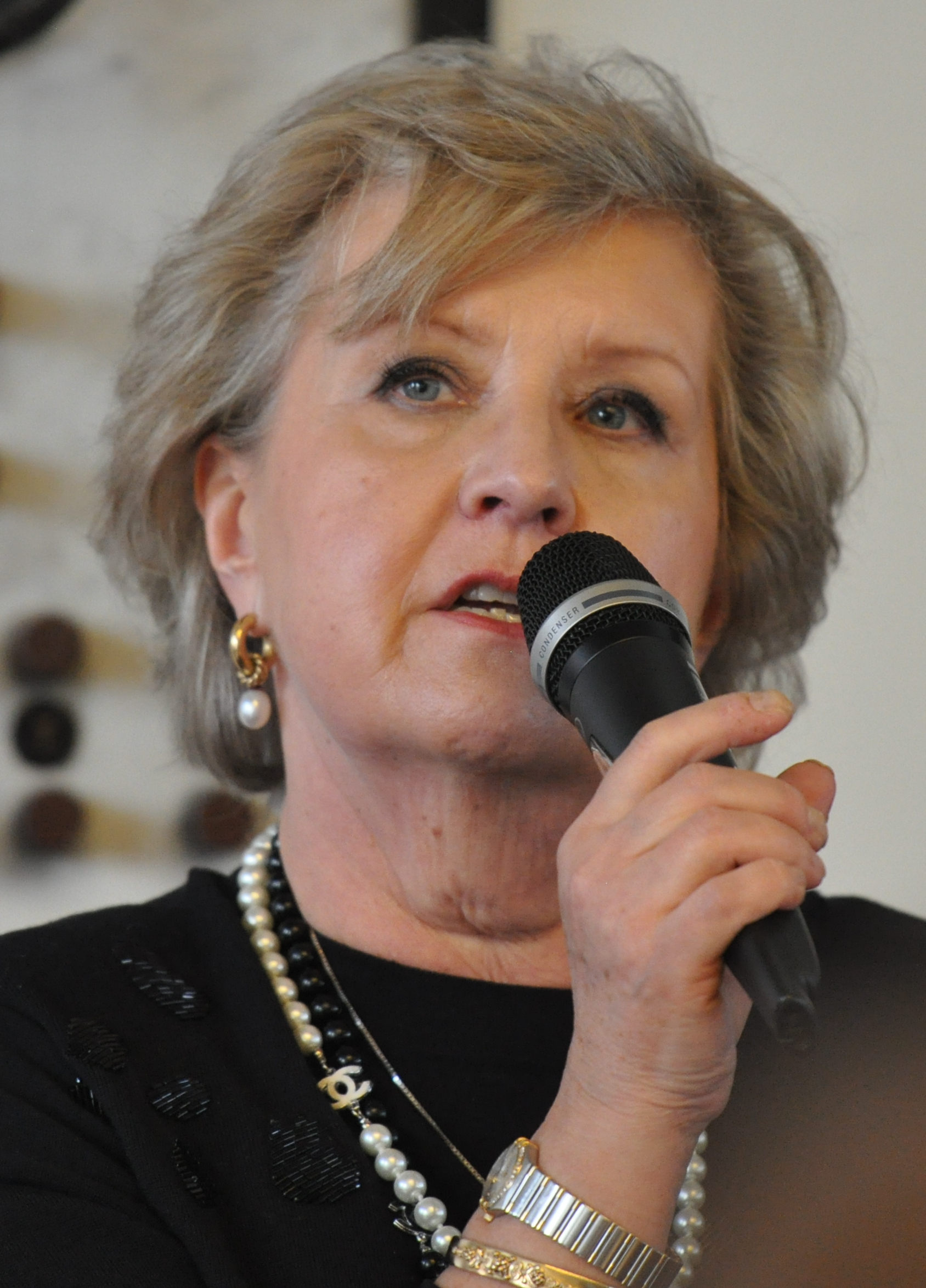
- Rasi in 2015
- Born: Marjatta Rasi; 29 November 1945; Punkalaidun, Finland
- Died: 23 May 2021 (aged 75); Helsinki, Finland
- Occupations: Diplomat and politician
- Known for: Ambassador to many countries and Permanent Representative to UN

Marjatta Rasi (29 November 1945 – 23 May 2021) was a Finnish diplomat. She represented Finland as Permanent Representative to the United Nations (UN), and as Ambassador to many countries posted at New Delhi, Dhaka, Colombo, Kathmandu, Thimphu, and Vienna. She worked as Head of Finland's Development Agency. In 2004, she was President of the United Nations Economic and Social Council (ECOSOC). After serving in New York City in the United Nations from 1998 to 2004, she was also the Under Secretary of State for Development Policy in the Ministry of Foreign Affairs (Finland).

== Early life and education ==
Rasi was born in Punkalaidun, Finland, on 29 November 1945. She was a Saha and cousin to Finnish-American science fiction editor Arthur W. Saha. She graduated from the Helsinki University in 1969 with a degree in law (LLB).

== Career ==
Rasi joined Finland's foreign service in the Ministry for Foreign Affairs in 1970 and was posted as Attaché at Vienna. In 1972, she was Second Secretary in the Finland Embassy in London. She then moved back to Finland and worked from 1977 as Secretary of Section in the Ministry for Foreign Affairs. Her next posting was in New York City in 1979 as Counselor to the Permanent Mission of Finland to the United Nations. She was back in Finland from 1983 until 1987 as Counselor in the Ministry for Foreign Affairs, where, from 1986 she became Director of the Political Department (UN sector). She was then posted again in New York City as Deputy Permanent Representative (Ambassador) of Finland to the United Nations Chairman of the Security Council Sanction Committee. In 1991, she became Ambassador of Finland to New Delhi, Dhaka, Colombo, Kathmandu and Thimphu. She was back in the Finland Ministry for Foreign Affairs as Director General, Department for International Development Cooperation, in 1995. She became a Permanent Representative of Finland to the United Nations in New York from 1 June 1998 until 2004.

On 20 October 1998, she presented the "Nordic view" on expansion of the membership of the Security Council. On 3 October 2001, in her address to the UN she stated the action plan of the European Union to eradicate international terrorism. From 2000 she was also a Member of the Board of the International Peace Academy. From 2002 to 2003 she worked as Vice President of the Economical and Social Council (ECOSOC) of the United Nations and was involved in planning post war aid. In a report to the Security Council presented on 28 May 2004 she stated: "Humanitarian assistance, rehabilitation, recovery and reconstruction can and will overlap. These actions must often be accompanied by continuous crisis mitigation and prevention to avoid setbacks. Peacekeeping and security must be part of a coherent approach." In 2004, she presented to the Economic Council a "draft resolution on the Status of non-governmental organizations and other groups accredited to the World Summit on Sustainable Development". In 2004, she also presented a report on "smooth transition strategies for countries graduating from the list of least developed countries".

When she was Under-Secretary of State for Development Policy at the Ministry for Foreign Affairs, she was invited to be a member of the advisory group for the UN Peace building Fund, and in 2006, she was Chair of this fund which had been established in 2005. Finland contributed 1.6 million Euros to this fund which covered assistance to Sierra Leone and Burundi.

In October 2009, she took charge as Ambassador to Austria in Vienna, replacing Kirsti Kauppi; she was the eleventh Ambassador from Finland to Austria. During this period she also served as Finland's Permanent Representative to the United Nations and other international organizations located in Vienna such as the International Atomic Energy Agency (IAEA), the International Nuclear-Test-Ban Treaty Organization (CTBTO) and the United Nations Industrial Development Organization (UNIDO). She retired from foreign service in 2013 after a long career.

== Political career ==
Following her retirement, the conservative National Coalition Party nominated Rasi for the 2014 European elections along with Kai Pöntinen. She secured 17 of 240 votes.

== Other activities ==
- African Development Bank (AfDB), Ex-Officio Member of the Board of Governors (2005-2009)

== Bibliography ==
- Council, United Nations Economic and Social; Assembly, United Nations. General (2 December 2005). Report of the Economic and Social Council for 2003. United Nations Publications. ISBN 978-92-1-810226-3.
- Fischer, Horst; McDonald, Avril; Dugard, John (7 January 2011). Yearbook of International Humanitarian Law - 2001. Cambridge University Press. ISBN 978-90-6704-169-0.
- Gupta, Ed. K.R. (1 January 2006). Reform of the United Nations. Atlantic Publishers & Dist. ISBN 978-81-269-0669-7.
- United Nations (1 November 2005). Index to Proceedings of the Economic and Social Council: Organizational and Substantive Sessions. United Nations Publications. ISBN 978-92-1-100982-8.
