= Hans Blomberg (electrical engineer) =

Finnish-Swedish automation pioneer and educator (1919 – 2006)

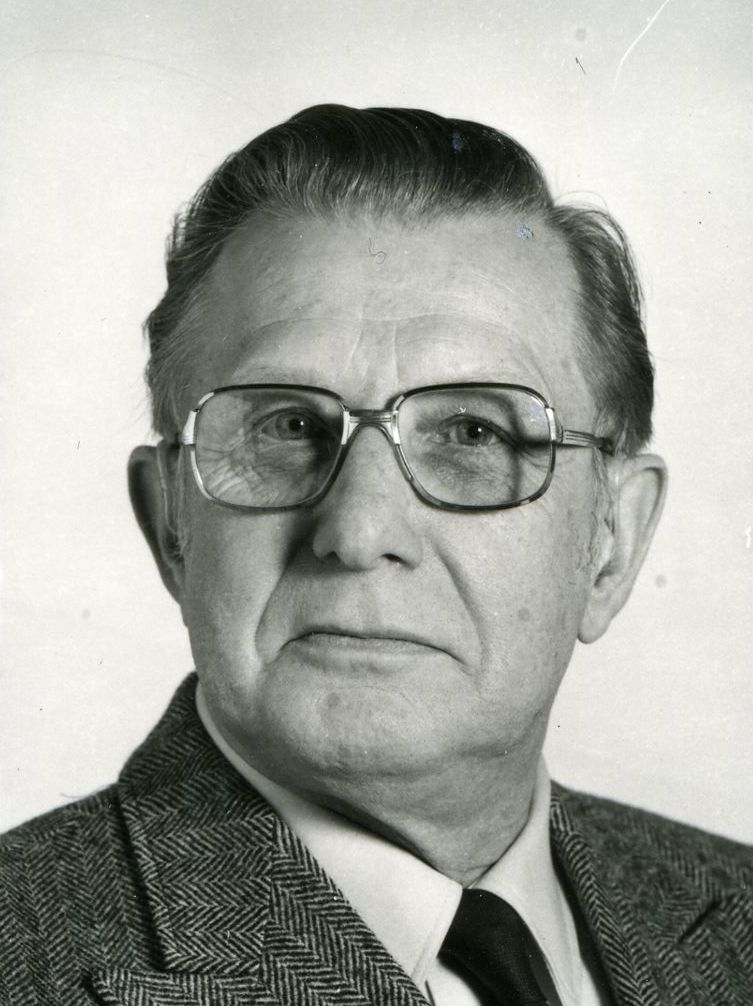
Hans Blomberg

Hans Blomberg (December 19, 1919 in Helsinki – November 5, 2006 in Espoo) was a Finnish-Swedish pioneer and educator in automation technology. Of the people working in industrial automation in the early 2000s, most had been trained by him or by his students.

== Early life and education ==
Blomberg's parents were builder Georg Fredrik Blomberg and Naema Alina Nyström. He became a student from the Swedish Normal Lyceum (Norsen) in 1937. He began his military service during the Winter War in March 1940, but was released a month later due to illness. He completed his studies in electrical engineering during the Continuation War and graduated as an engineer from the Helsinki University of Technology in 1943.

== Career ==
After graduating, Blomberg worked as a test engineer at Strömberg Ab from 1943 to 1944 and as a researcher at the State Institute of Technology in Helsinki (now VTT Technical Research Centre of Finland) between 1944 and 1956. He received his doctorate in technology in 1953 with the thesis "A sensitive light indicator instrument intended for the integration of weak electrical voltage impulses with regarding time".

Blomberg taught alternating current theory at the Helsinki University of Technology between 1948 and 1954 and published, among other things, a compendium "Alternating current theory". In addition, he taught during the years 1953 - 1956 in both theoretical electrical engineering and general electrical engineering. He was appointed professor of theoretical electrical engineering at the Helsinki University of Technology from 1956 to 1985.

In addition to his professorship, Blomberg worked as head of the electrotechnical department at the Helsinki University of Technology during the period 1959 - 1962 and as the university's vice-chancellor with responsibility for teaching matters 1981 - 1985. He also held secondary positions as head of the electrotechnical laboratory at the Norwegian Institute of Technology during the period 1962 - 1972 and as a teacher at the Technical Education Agency in Helsinki 1955 - 1962.

== Research and teaching ==
Blomberg chose control technology as his teaching and research area at an early stage. He had come into contact with the new discipline in connection with his doctoral thesis, where he thoroughly immersed himself in the area. In his teaching, Blomberg was a pioneer and innovated teaching methods. He wrote a multi-faceted compendium in two parts entitled "Regleringsteknikens theoretical grunder". The compendium is mentioned in a publication issued by the international control technology organization IFAC as an example of historical textbook texts in control technology.

Blomberg's research concentrates on systems theory, which lays the theoretical foundations for control technology, such as the algebraic theory of linear differential and difference systems, and provides a basis for understanding and managing also non-technical systems and networks. His long-term work resulted in 1983 in the book "Algebraic Theory for Multivariable Linear Systems" published by Academic Press. The book, which is still relevant 40 years later, summarized the results produced in the theory of linear systems. Blomberg was one of the first professors to introduce systematic doctoral studies at the Helsinki University of Technology. Blomberg trained 22 doctors as well as a large number of other students, who applied their knowledge in both academic and industrial environments. Of the researchers who worked in his laboratory, 15 have been appointed professors, including Jorma Rissanen.

Although Blomberg's own research work was theoretical and in many respects mathematical, he had a good understanding of practical applications. The basic idea in his research work was that all method development should start from practical problems and provide solid solutions to them. Practical solutions were also based on accurate models and systematic and mathematical work, which often led to new innovative solutions and applications.

== Personal life ==
Blomberg married Kätchen Rut Lindman in 1943. In the marriage, two daughters were born. In midsummer 1975, Kätchen died after an attack of illness, which she contracted at the summer resort in Bromarv. In 1976 he married Elseby Kristina Lagerbohm, who died in 1996.

Blomberg died on 5 November 2006, aged 87.

== Honors and awards ==
Professor Blomberg was a member of the Swedish Academy of Technical Sciences in Finland in 1958 and to the corresponding Finnish Academy of Technical Sciences in 1963.

Blomberg was awarded the Prime Minister's Mauritz Hallberg Prize by the Swedish Literature Society in Finland in 1956.
