= Harry Helenius =

Finnish diplomat (1946–2019)

Harry Gustaf Helenius (22 June 1946, Oulu — 14 March 2019, Helsinki) was a Finnish diplomat.

Helenius studied at Svenska normallyceum i Helsingfors and then graduated as a Bachelor of Philosophy from the University of Helsinki. He joined the Ministry for Foreign Affairs in 1973 and made a career over 40 years in the Ministry for retirement in summer 2014.

Helenius served as Ambassador of Finland to Russia 2004–2008, to Germany 2008–2011 and to Sweden in 2011–2014. He also served in Madrid (1978–1981), in Vienna (1986–1988) and as Consul General in St. Petersburg (1998–2001).
