= Werner Söderhjelm =

Swedish-speaking Finnish linguist, researcher of literary history and diplomat

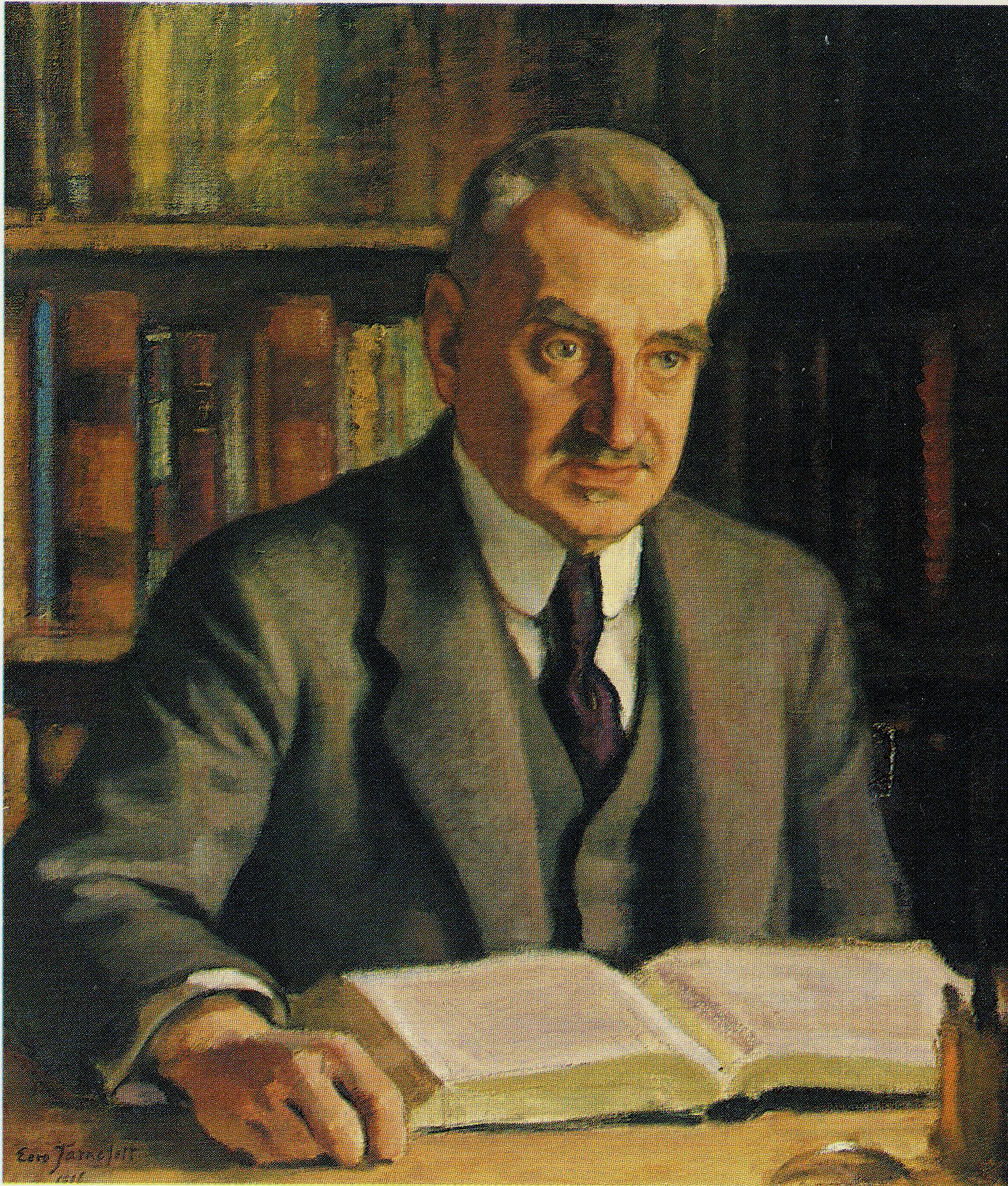
Werner Söderhjelm's portrait by Eero Järnefelt from 1916

Jarl Werner Söderhjelm (26 July 1859 – 16 January 1931) was a Swedish-speaking Finnish linguist, researcher of literary history and diplomat.

Söderhjelm was born in Viipuri. His parents were Procurator Woldemar Söderhjelm and Amanda Olivia Clouberg. Through his family connections, he was exposed to a variety of languages and he took an early interest in literature.

He graduated from Viipuri Classical Lyceum in 1877, graduated as a Bachelor of Philosophy, with a Master's degree in 1882, and as a Licentiate and Doctorate from the Imperial Alexander University in 1885.

Söderhjelm was a docent of the new literature at the University of Helsinki from 1886 to 1889, Romanesque Philology as a Docent from 1889 to 1894 and an Extra Professor from 1894 to 1898.

He worked as a Germanic philologist and professor of Romanesque philology from 1898 to 1908 as Professor of Romanesque Philology in 1908-1913. He applied for the professorship of aesthetics and modern literature in 1910, but was beaten to it by Yrjö Hirn. Finally Söderhjelm became professor of Finnish and general literary history from 1913 to 1919.

Söderhjelm attended in the Diet of Finland as a member from the clergy from 1904 to 1905. In the early 1900s he belonged to the Young Finnish Party's conservative wing and was a member of the Young People Party Central Committee from 1906 to 1907.

After the independence of Finland, he served as Director in the Finnish News Agency in Copenhagen from 1918 to 1919 and as Envoy to Stockholm from 1919 to 1928.

Werner Söderhjelm was married from 1884 to Sigrid Wilhelmina Lönnblad. They had four sons, the most famous being the writer and editor Henning Söderhjelm. His youngest son, J. O. Söderhjelm, served as a Minister of Justice during the Winter War. Werner Söderhjelm's sister was Finland's first female professor Alma Söderhjelm. Activist Konni Zilliacus was his cousin.

He died in Helsinki, aged 71.

== Publications ==
- Om Johann Elias Schlegel, särskildt som lustspeldiktare (1884)
- Ströftåg och sommarminnen (1884)
- Petrarca in der deutschen Dichtung (1886)
- Ur Nils von Rosensteins finska korrespondens (1889)
- Das Martinleben des Péan Gatineau de Tours (1891)
- Das altfranzösische Martinsleben des Péan Gatineau aus Tours (1899)
- Germaniska och romaniska språkstudier (1892)
- Saint Martin et la roman de la Belle Hélène de Constantinople (1893)
- Moderna språk och deras studium i Finland (1894)
- Leben und Wunderthaten des heiligen Martin (1896)
- Promotionspoesi vid Åbo universitet (1897)
- Kirjoituksia ja tutkielmia (1898)
- En finsk språkkännare och öfversättare från seklets förra hälft (1900)
- Karl August Tavaststjerna (1900)
- Brytningstider (1901)
- Sagan om Tristan och Iseut (1901)
- Johan Ludvig Runeberg (1904, 1906)
- Spuren von Ciceros verlornem Tractate De Virtutibus bei einem französischen Schriftsteller des fünfzehnten Jahrhunderts? (1904)
- Norges folkrepresentation (1906)
- Meddelanden till J.L. Runeberg Om händelser under finska kriget 1808-1809 (1908)
- Notes sur Antoine de la Sale et ses æuvres (1908)
- Les inspirateurs des Quinze joyes de mariage (1909)
- Två föredrag om Goethe (1909)
- La nouvelle française au XV:e siècle (1910)
- Studier i fransk berättarkonst (1910)
- Francesco Maria Molza (1911)
- Bernhard von Beskovs brev till Runeberg (1913)
- Profiler ur finskt kulturliv (1913)
- Les nouvelles de F.M. Molza (1914)
- Oscar Levertin, en minnesteckning (1914, 1917)
- Åboromantiken och dess samband med utländska idéströmningar (1915)
- Dante (1916)
- Minna Canth (1916)
- Utklipp om böcker (1916)
- Förhållanden och förhoppningar i Finland (1917)
- Johannes Linnankoski (1918)
- En finsk novellist (1919)
- Kotimaisia kulttuurikuvia (1920)
- Almqvist och Finland (1922)
- Pierre de Provence (1922)
- En samling resebrev (1923)
- Pierre de Provence et la belle Maguelone (1924)
- Litteratur och politik i Finland 1809-1860 (1925)
- Litterära uppsatser (1925)
- Mikael Bernays (1927)
- Läroår i främmande länder (1928)
- Fransk elementarbok (1891)
- Fransk språklära (1892)
- Choix de lectures françaises (1900)
- Italiensk Renässans (1907)
- La vie de Saint Quentin par Huon le Roi de Cambrai publieé pour la première fois (1909)
