= Permanent Representative of Finland to the United Nations =

Permanent Representative of the Republic of Finland
- Flag of the United Nations
- Incumbent; Elina Kalkku since August 2022
- Website: http://finlandabroad.fi/UN

This is a list of the permanent representatives of the Republic of Finland to the United Nations. The current office holder is Elina Kalkku.

== List ==
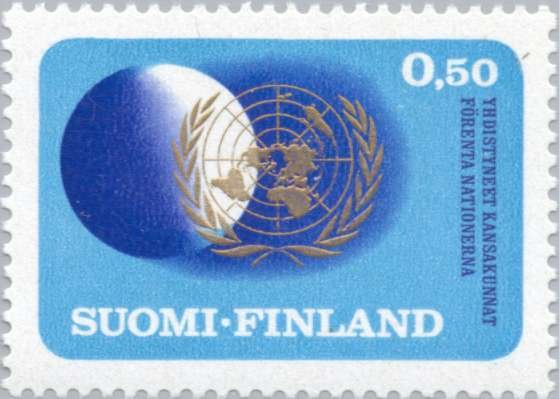
Stamp of Finland (United Nations) 1970s

Term of years	Permanent Representative	President	Secretary-General
1956–1958	G. A. Gripenberg	Juho Kusti Paasikivi	Trygve Lie
1959–1965	Ralph Enckell	Urho Kekkonen	Dag Hammarskjöld
1965–1972	Max Jakobson	Urho Kekkonen	U Thant
1972–1977	Aarno Karhilo	Urho Kekkonen	Kurt Waldheim
1977–1983	Ilkka Pastinen	Urho Kekkonen	Kurt Waldheim
1983–1988	Keijo Korhonen	Mauno Koivisto	Javier Pérez de Cuéllar
1988–1991	Klaus Törnudd	Mauno Koivisto	Javier Pérez de Cuéllar
1991–1998	Wilhelm Breitenstein	Mauno Koivisto	Javier Pérez de Cuéllar
1998–2005	Marjatta Rasi	Martti Ahtisaari	Kofi Annan
2005–2009	Kirsti Lintonen	Tarja Halonen	Kofi Annan
2009–2012	Jarmo Viinanen	Tarja Halonen	Ban Ki-moon
2012–2014	Jarmo Viinanen	Sauli Niinistö	Ban Ki-moon
2014–2019	Kai Sauer	Sauli Niinistö	Ban Ki-moon
2019–2022	Jukka Salovaara	Sauli Niinistö	António Guterres
2022–2024	Elina Kalkku	Sauli Niinistö	António Guterres
2024–	Elina Kalkku	Alexander Stubb	António Guterres

== See also ==
- Foreign relations of Finland
