= G. A. Gripenberg =

Finnish diplomat

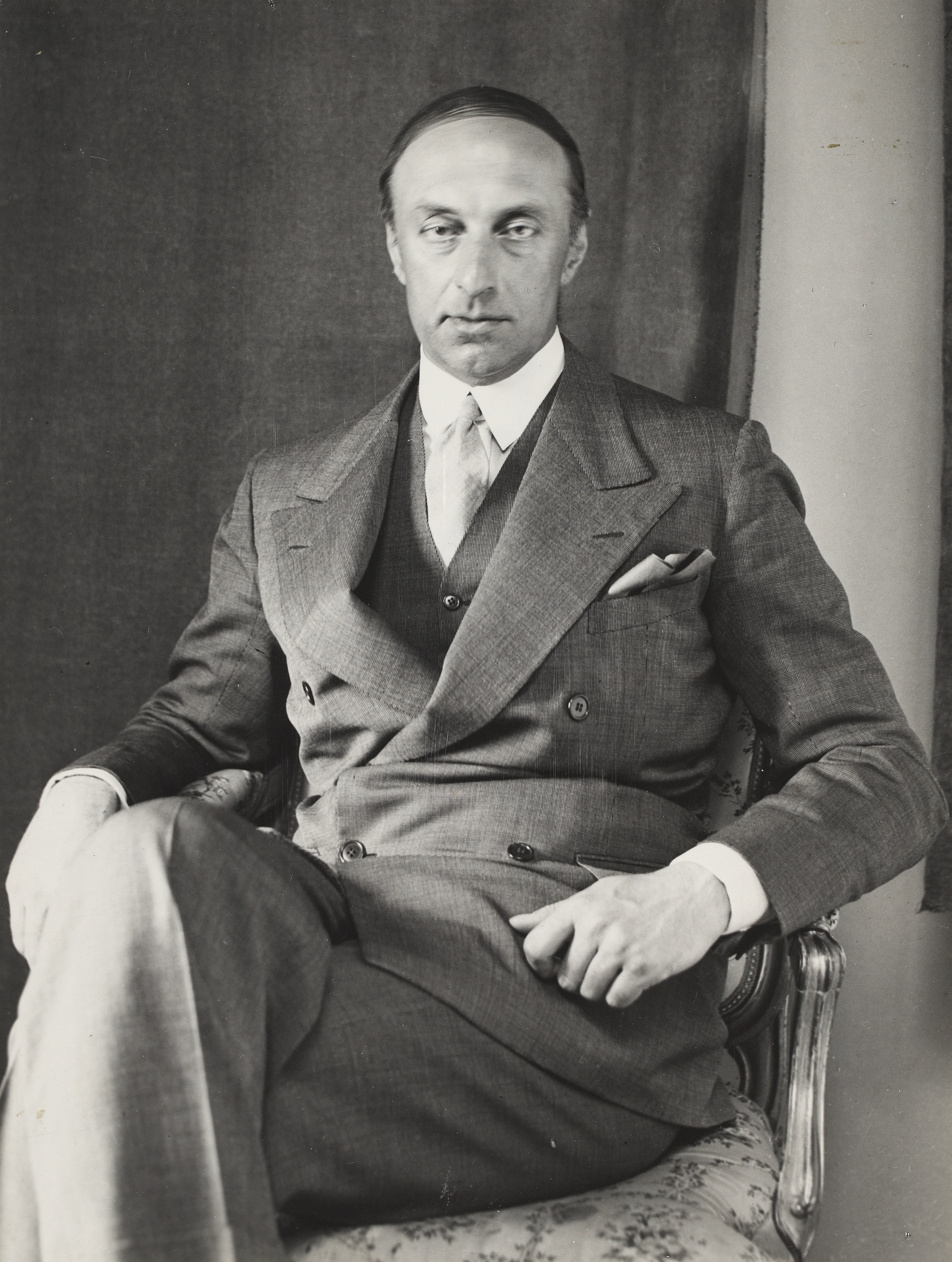
G. A. Gripenberg at the beginning of the 1930s

Georg Achates Gripenberg (18 May 1890, Saint Petersburg – 31 May 1975, Helsinki) was a Finland-Swedish diplomat. He served as an Envoy of Finland to London in 1933–1941 and in Stockholm from 1943 to 1956 and as Finland's first Ambassador to the United Nations from 1956 to 1958.

== Biography ==
He was born in Saint Petersburg, Russia Empire, to a noble family. His father, Alexis Gripenberg, was a State Councilor and an activist for Finnish independence. His mother, Agnes Maria Fredrika von Haartman, was also from a noble family.

Gripenberg graduated from the Gymnasiet Lärkan in 1907 and earned his Bachelor of Philosophy from the University of Helsinki in 1911. From 1908 to 1909 he also studied at Oxford University and the London School of Economics in England. He eventually took a degree in law from Uppsala University in Sweden, in 1917. He then acted as a private secretary to his father for a short time before moving to Finland to join the civil war in the White Guard.

In 1918, he was hired by Finland's newly established Ministry for Foreign Affairs and was appointed his country's first diplomatic representative to Sweden. He resigned the following year. In 1920 he was recruited back to the ministry's office as Permanent Secretary.

He initially served as a Chargé d'Affaires, from 1921 to 1923 in Brussels, The Hague and Luxembourg, from 1923 to 1929 in Madrid and Lisbon and from 1929 to 1933 as Envoy to Buenos Aires, Rio de Janeiro and Santiago de Chile.

In 1933, he was appointed Envoy to London, Finland's most important diplomatic post. His term there lasted until diplomatic relations between the United Kingdom and Finland were broken during the Continuation War, following the British war declaration at the end of 1941.

He was in non-active status in Finland until he was named representative to the Holy See in the autumn of 1942. The following spring he was transferred to Stockholm. It was, at that time, the most important foreign mission in Finland, especially because the Soviet Union had decided to conduct peace talks with Finland in Stockholm following the end of World War II.

He generally avoided political influence, but was caught in the middle of competing interests because of his position. He served as Envoy for more than a decade of war and was a favorite of President J. K. Paasikivi, who appreciated his qualifications. For the last two years in Stockholm, 1954–1956, he served as the Ambassador.

After Stockholm, he was Finland's first ambassador to the United Nations 1956–1958, after which he retired. He received many domestic and foreign decorations and wrote several extensive memoirs during his retirement years.

His first marriage was 1921–1923 with Lily Uchermann, daughter to Vilhelm Uchermann, and his second from 1927 with Peggy Moseley-Williams.

== Bibliography ==
- Generalmajor Hans Henrik Gripenberg: En biografisk konturteckning. Söderström, 1937.
- En beskickningschefs minnen 1: Finland i världskriget 1939–40. Natur och Kultur, 1959.
- En beskickningschefs minnen 2: London–Vatikanen–Stockholm. Natur och kultur, 1959.
- Neutralitetstanken i Finlands politik. 1960
- Diplomatisk vardag. Söderström, 1964.
- Dagbok 1943–1946. Royal Society for Publication of Manuscripts on Scandinavian History, 2019.
