= Jorma Vanamo =

Finnish diplomat (1913–2006)

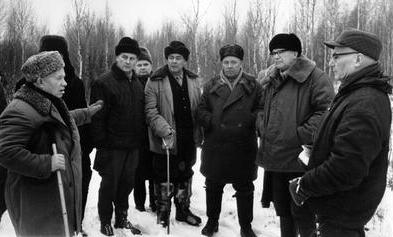
Nikita Khrushchev speaking, Urho Kekkonen, Leonid Brezhnev, Nikolai Podgorny, Jorma Vanamo and Kustaa Loikkanen in 1963

Jorma Jaakko Vanamo (30 October 1913 Mouhijärvi–13 December 2006 Helsinki) was a Finnish diplomat. He served as Finland's ambassador to Warsaw (1958–1963), Moscow (1963–1967), Rome, Valletta and Nicosia (1970–1975) and Stockholm (1975–1980). He also served as Ambassador to Bucharest (1958–1960), Sofia (1958–1963), Kabul (1963–1966) and Ulan Bator (1963–1966).

== Childhood and youth ==
Jorma Vanamo was born as a child of pharmacists.

Vanamo belonged to the first members of the Pykälä Association of the largest law school students in Finland and served as its third chairman in 1937–1938.

== Ura ==
When graduating as a lawyer in 1939, Jorma Vanamo had worked in the Ministry for Foreign Affairs for more than a month. On 1 February 1939, Vanamo started at the Ministry of Foreign Affairs as an unpardonable typist, and on 3 March 1939, he officially joined the Foreign Service. Vanamo was also able to prove the development that led to Winter War at the beginning of his career. The Baltic states where negotiating with o the Soviet Union on base requirements, when Jorma Valamo on 5 October 1939, was a telegraphist when Moscow sent a secret telegram to Aarno Yrjö-Koskinen.

The central element of the telegram was the invitation of the Kremlin to negotiate concrete political issues. After the Winter War, Vanamo was sent to the office of deputy to Stockholm. At the end of the war, he was transferred to Moscow, where Juho Kusti Paasikivi served as Envoy

At the beginning of the Continuation War, Vanamo received a seat from Finland as Secretary of State for Foreign Affairs. He was at the Political Department of the Ministry for Foreign Affairs, and Vanamo's duties included secret telegrams. It can be said that Vanamo's career progressed very fast, for just under two and a half years after he had come to the Ministry of Foreign Affairs, he had already been appointed a permanent official.

In the early spring of 1942, Jorma Vanamo took the cryptography course and after the course he developed secretarial systems in the Foreign Ministry. He served as secretary of state until the end of the war. Vanomo also translated the first draft of the Finno-Soviet Treaty in May 1945. When the diplomatic relations between Finland and the Soviet Union returned, Vanamo returned to Moscow in August 1945. He continued his duties in Moscow until 1948. This term also included the Finnish-Soviet treaty negotiations. Vanamo did not personally participate in the negotiations but was responsible for sending delegations of secret ballot, which was why he was well aware of the conduct of the negotiations. The Finnish-Soviet Agreement entered into force on 6 April 1948.

In 1948, Vanamo moved to the post of deputy secretary at the Ministry of Foreign Affairs and became the Secretary next year .

Between 1951 and 53 Vanamo was again sent to Stockholm, now the first Secretary of the Embassy and Delegation Counselor. From Sweden, he became Deputy Director General at the Ministry for Foreign Affairs in the Trade Policy Department in 1953 to negotiate trade agreements with the Soviet Union. Vanamo moved to Washington, D.C. in 1954. The area included administrative matters, consular offices, and political issues. After two years in the United States, Vanamo returned to the Ministry of Foreign Affairs as Head of the Administrative Department in 1956. After two years in the United States, Vanamo returned to the Ministry of Foreign Affairs as Head of the Administrative Department in 1956.

Jorma Vanamosta became an Ambassador in Warsaw in 1958, where he also worked for relations between Finland and Bulgaria. The Warsaw years were followed four years in Moscow in 1963–67, this time at the ambassador's post.

During this time as President Urho Kekkonen, during the second time, he was convinced of Vanama's qualifications. In 1967, he was appointed State Secretary to the Ministry for Foreign Affairs. During his State Secretaryship, Vanama played an important role in dealing with the investigation of the operation of the Soviet Ambassador Aleksey Beljakov. Beljakov was revealed to support the Stalinist hardline wing of the Finnish Communist Party, which naturally strengthened the ideological role of the Soviet Union in domestic politics in Finland. The case led to the resignation of Beljakov from his post and return to his native country in the spring of 1971.

After the end of the 1960s in Finland, Vanamo was sent back in 1970 to a new place of employment in Rome. Finland and Italy had not had mutual visits to date, but now President Kekkonen made a state visit to Italy in January 1971. Foreign Minister Aldo Moro made a return visit to Finland in the same spring

Vanamo returned to Stockholm as an ambassador directly from Rome in 1975. There he worked until his retirement, until 1980.
