= Björn-Olof Alholm =

Finnish ambassador (1925–2011)

Björn-Olof Alholm (25 April 1925 Mikkeli – 17 June 2011 Helsinki) was a Finnish ambassador who made a 40-year career in Foreign Affairs and was a known as dissident during the Urho Kekkonen presidency.

Alholm fought in the Winter War at the age of 14 in a division led by his father's Jaeger, Lieutenant Colonel Georg Alholm. He wounded in 1941 but was still involved in a major battle at Kannas in 1944.

In the autumn of 1944, Alholm entered the Reserve Officer School. Alholm graduated as a Master of Political Science in 1948 and joined to the Ministry for Foreign Affairs the same year. As an ambassador he started in 1966 in Bucharest and then in Switzerland between 1968 and 1970 and then in Moscow between 1970 and 1974 and then in 1974–1977 in Bonn.

Alholm's Bonn time was stormy, and, among other things, these times and, more generally, Kekkonen presidency he has dealt with in his book The Dissident Ambassador (2001). After Bonn, Alholm worked in Cairo, Vienna and last since 1983 in Stockholm, he retired in 1991
