= Liisa Talonpoika =

Finnish diplomat

Liisa Maria Talonpoika (born 28 April 1961, Turku, Finland) is a Finnish diplomat, and the country's current Ambassador to Stockholm, Sweden, where she presented her credentials on 16 May 2018. She is the first female to hold this post.

Talonpoika was previously Finland's Ambassador to The Hague in 2013–2015, and has held other overseas diplomatic appointments in Paris and Brussels, as well as working in senior roles at the Finnish Ministry for Foreign Affairs.

Liisa Talonpoika studied at the Swedish-language Åbo Akademi University in Turku, graduating with a master's degree in Economics in 1986. In addition to her native Finnish, she speaks fluent Swedish, English and French, and has a basic command of Dutch.
