= Leo Tuominen =

Finnish diplomat

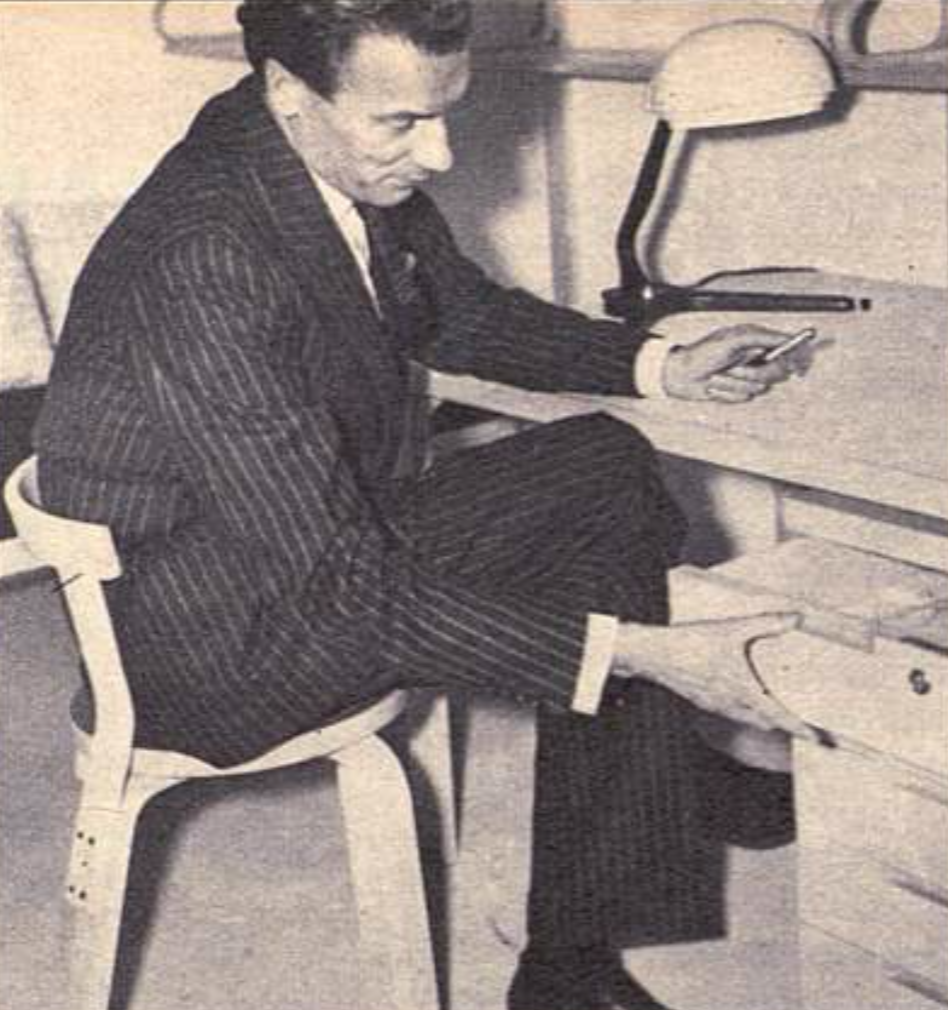
Leo Tuominen in 1968

Leo Olavi Tuominen (Ph.D.) (19 January 1911, Turku – 1981) was a Finnish diplomat and ambassador. From 1950 to 1952 he was the Permanent Representative of Finland as an Observer at the UN Mission in Europe in Geneva.

Between 1952 and 1955, as Ambassador in Buenos Aires, Montevideo and Santiago, then Head of the Department of Commerce of the Ministry for Foreign Affairs, 1955–1956, and Permanent Secretary and State Secretary 1956–1957. Between 1957 and 1968 he was an Ambassador in London and between 1968 and 1969 in Rome and Nicosia, Stockholm between 1969–1972 and in Washington, 1972–1977.
