= Alec Aalto =

Finnish diplomat

Personal details
- Born: September 24, 1942 Helsinki, Finland
- Died: December 24, 2018 (aged 76)
- Parent(s): Märta Laurent (mother), Arvo Mikael Aalto (father)
- Education: Bachelor of Law, University of Helsinki; International Law, University of Oxford
- Occupation: Diplomat
- Known for: Ambassador to Austria, Italy, Sweden

Alec Mikael Aalto (24 September 1942 – 24 December 2018) was a Finnish diplomat. In the Foreign Ministry, he started in 1979 and served as Finland's Ambassador in Austria (1991–1995), Italy (2003–2006) and Sweden in 2006–2010 until his retirement.

== Education ==
Aalto was born in Helsinki, and studied at Svenska normallyceum before graduating as a bachelor of law in 1967 from the University of Helsinki. Between 1968 and 1970, he studied international law at Oxford University.

== Career ==
Between 1970 and 1972, Aalto worked as a journalist for the Finnish Broadcasting Company, after which he was from 1973 to 1975 Head of Information department in the Council of State. He also served as the Head of Press Affairs in the European Security and Cooperation Conference. In Aalto was in 1975 in the Prime Minister Keijo Liinama's caretaker cabinet as Prime Minister's secretary and from 1976 to 1978, the information director of Neste Oy.

Aalto joined the Ministry for Foreign Affairs in 1979. Until 1984, he served as the Head of the Ministry's Press and Culture Center, in 1985 as the Negotiating Officer of the Trade Policy Department and in 1986-1991 as Deputy Director of the Department of Trade Policy.

=== Work as ambassador ===
In 1991, Aalto started as an Ambassador in Austria while acting as a Permanent Representative of Finland in the UN organizations in Vienna and was accredited also in Slovenia. Between 1995 and 1997, Aalto worked as Prime Minister's Special Assistant in the Council of the State in international affairs. In 1997–2003 he was State Secretary for European Affairs and in 2000–2003 also Head of the EU Secretariat of the Council of State.

Between 2003 and 2006, Aalto was Finland's Ambassador in Italy, accredited to Malta and San Marino. In June 2006, he started his last ward as Ambassador in Sweden. Aalto retired in February in 2010.

== Personal life ==
Aalto's parents were actress Märta Laurent and Commercial Counselor Arvo Mikael Aalto. He was bilingual. He had a wife and daughter. Aalto performed music and enjoyed the countryside, in the archipelago and in Lapland.
