= Matti Kahiluoto =

Finnish diplomat (1931–2018)

Matti Kalervo Kahiluoto (11 March 1931 – 24 January 2018) was a Finnish diplomat and political scientist.

Kahiluoto was born in Helsinki. He served as ambassador to Tel Aviv 1975–1981, in Belgrade in 1981– 1984, Head of the Special Representative at the Stockholm Disarmament Conference (OSCE) as title of Ambassador 1984–1986, Head of the Political Department of the Ministry for Foreign Affairs 1986–1988, and then Ambassador in Vienna 1988–1991 and Stockholm 1991–1996, after he retired
