= Markus Lyra =

Finnish diplomat (1945–2024)

Markus Ludvig Lyra (3 August 1945 – 30 September 2024) was a Finnish diplomat. He served as Ambassador of Finland to Sweden in 2010–2011. He was employed by the Ministry for Foreign Affairs since 1973.

In 2005–2010, Lyra served as the Under-Secretary of State for Political Affairs at the Ministry of Foreign Affairs. Prior to joining the Political Department, Lyra served as its department head for the years 2000–2004. From 1996 to 2000 he served as Ambassador in Moscow.

Lyra had a Bachelor of Political Science from the University of Helsinki, obtained in 1970.

Lyra's spouse was Helena Lyra (died in 2008). They had four children. Markus Lyra's mother tongue is Swedish.
