= Pertti Torstila =

Finnish diplomat

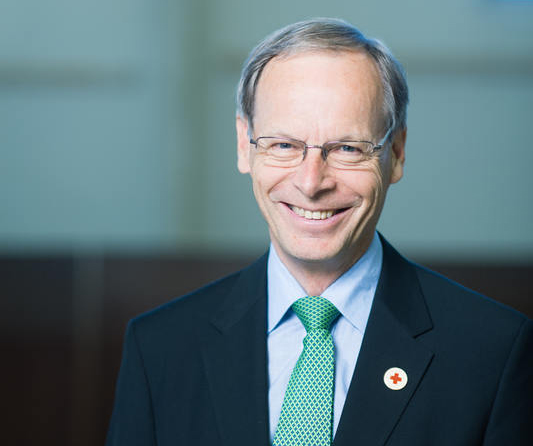
Pertti Torstila in 2014

Pertti Juhani Torstila (born 13 February 1946 in Jyväskylän maalaiskunta) is a Finnish retired diplomat. He has had a long career in the Ministry for Foreign Affairs of Finland made by an official and a diplomat. Prior to his retirement, he served as State Secretary for Foreign Affairs in 2006-2014.

In June 2014, Torstila was elected Chairman of the Finnish Red Cross.

In May 2015, Torstila was promoted to the post of Honorary Doctor of the Faculty of Social Sciences at the University of Budapest (Eötvös Lorand).

Pertti Torstila was elected in November 2015 as a "Social Science Fellow".

== Career ==
Torstila graduated as student in 1965. In 1966-1967, he was the UN peacekeeping forces (UNFICYP) in Cyprus. In 1970, Torstila graduated with a Bachelor of Political Science from the University of Helsinki and started the same year as an assistant at the Ministry of Foreign Affairs. Between 1972 and 1973, Torstila prepared a European Conference on Security and Cooperation (OSCE), whose summit was held in Helsinki in 1975.

From 1973 to 1976, Torstila was Secretary of the Embassy of the Paris and from 1976 to 1978 at the Embassy of Budapest. From 1979 to 1980, Torstila was the Foreign Affairs Secretary of the Political Department of the Foreign Ministry. In 1980-1981, Torstila studied at the École nationale d'administration and in 1981-1984 was the Counselor in Paris.

From 1984 to 1988, Torstila was Head of the Department of Disarmament and Security Policy at the Department of Political Affairs of the Foreign Ministry and in 1988-1989 Deputy Head of the Political Department. From 1989 to 1992, he was the Finnish OSCE Ambassador in Vienna. In 1992, Torstila was Vice-Chairman of the Finnish OSCE delegation at the OSCE Monitoring and Summit in Helsinki.

Torstila was an ambassador in 1992-1996 in Hungary and Croatia. Between 1996 and 2000, he was head of the Political Department of the Ministry of Foreign Affairs and in 2000-2002 was the Under-Secretary of State. From 2002 to 2006, he was the Ambassador of Finland to Stockholm before moving to the State Secretary of the Ministry of Foreign Affairs in May 2006. He retired in February 2014.
