= Päivö Tarjanne =

Finnish diplomat

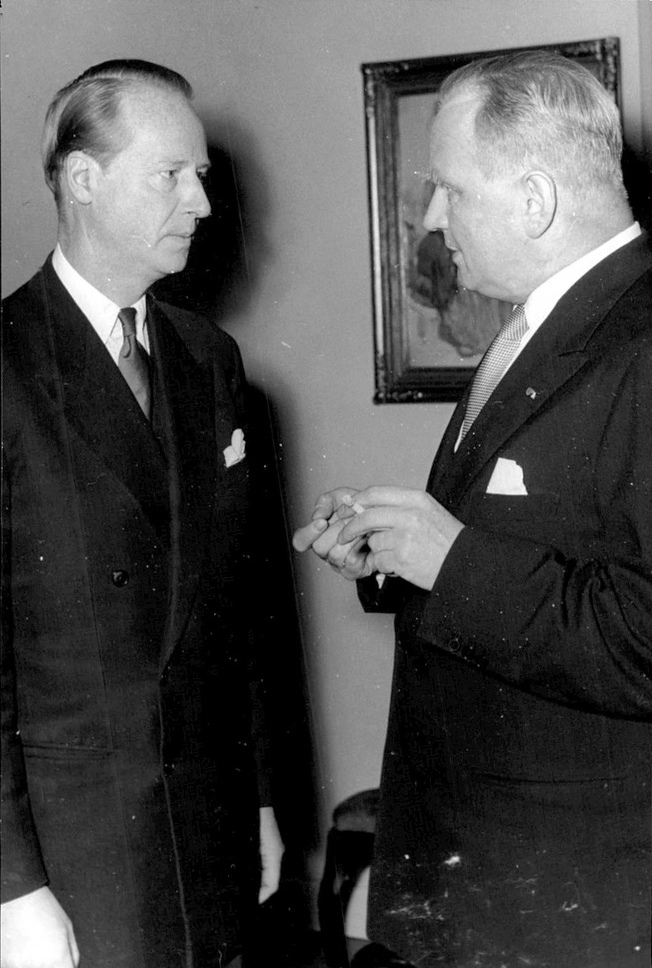
Päivö Tarjanne (right) in 1965

Päivö Kaukomieli Tarjanne (until 1906 Törnqvist; 4 May 1903, Hämeenlinna – 16 December 1989, Helsinki) was a Finnish diplomat.

Tarján graduated from the University of Helsinki as a lawyer in 1928 and immediately became an official trainee at the Ministry for Foreign Affairs.

He served as ambassador in Oslo between 1945-1950 and at Reykjavík in 1947-1950 and as Permanent Secretary at the Ministry of Foreign Affairs from 1950 to 1953.

Between 1953 and 1956, Tarjanne served as an ambassador in Copenhagen, and the following year, his status became an ambassador when Finland's major delegation's were elevated to embassies. From 1956 to 1961, Tarjanne was an ambassador in Stockholm, but returned from Copenhagen to 1961–1970. He retired in 1970.

The parents of Tarjante were the schoolmaster Jukka Tarjanne and Hellin Lovisa Makkonen.He had been married to Anna-Kertun ("Annu") by his daughter, Heikki Ritavuori, since 1932 and had three sons. Of them, Pekka Tarjanne became known both as a politician and as a scientist.
