= Embassy of Finland, Moscow =

Coordinates: 55.7391°N 37.5906°E

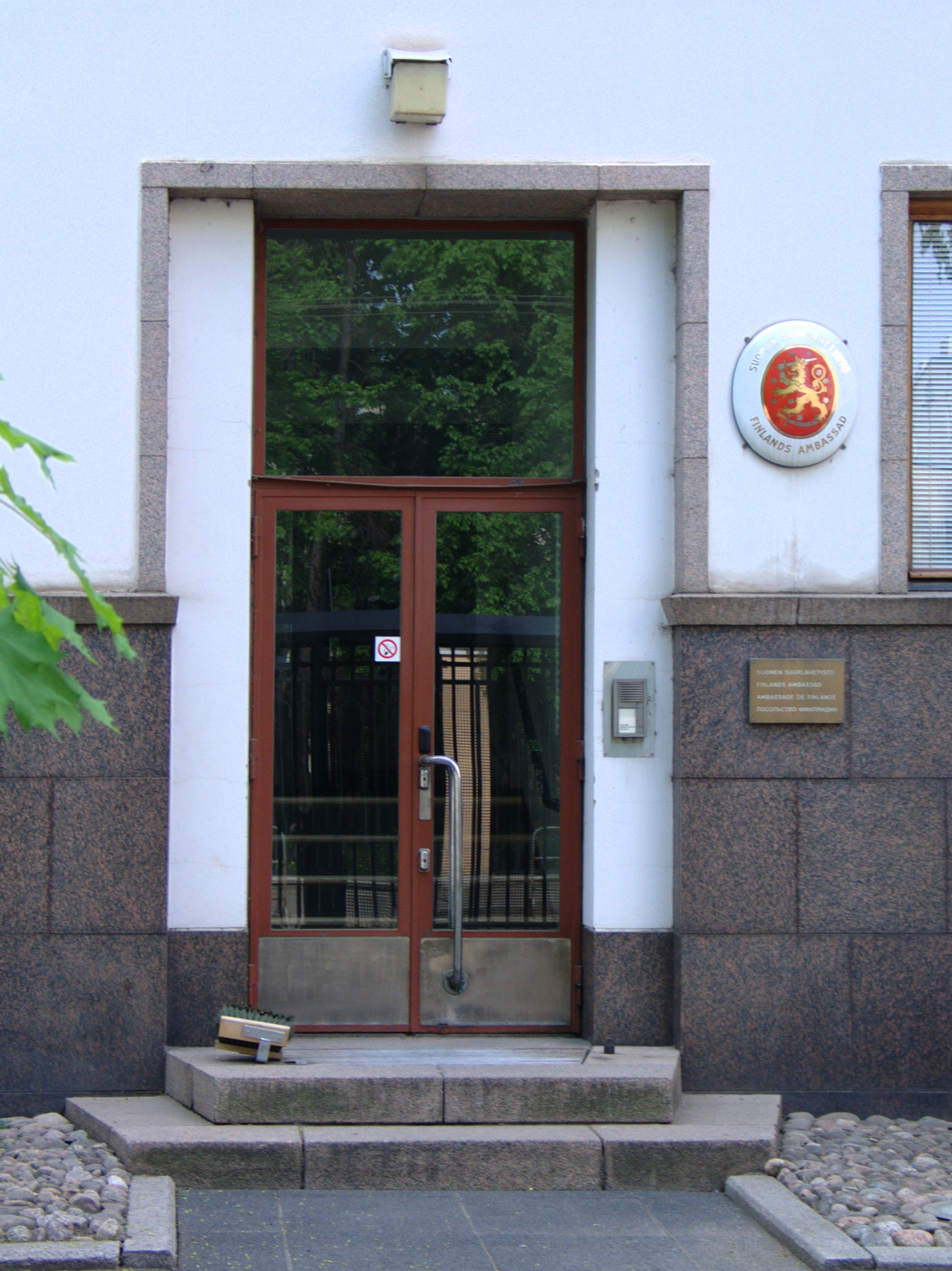
- Location: Moscow
- Ambassador: Marja Liivala

The Embassy of the Republic of Finland in Moscow is the chief diplomatic mission of Finland in the Russian Federation. It is located at 15-17 Kropotkinsky Lane (Russian: Кропоткинский пер., 15/17) in the Khamovniki District of Moscow.

== Embassy building ==
The current building of the embassy has been in use since December 6, 1948; Finland's independence day. It is the first building that Finland built specifically as a diplomatic mission. It was also the first foreign mission to be built in the Soviet capital of Moscow and it remains one of the few functionalist buildings in the city.

The building's large balcony is called "Paasikiven komentosilta"; "The command bridge of Paasikivi". Inside, in the decorative hall between the dining hall and the great hall, there are two paintings by Ilya Repin and gilded furniture from the beginning of the 20th century. According to legend, the furniture originates from the minister-secretary of state's residence during the Grand Duchy of Finland. The great hall features modern furniture and the dining hall has furniture designed by Elli Ruuth.

When the building was completed, the staff lived in the embassy area. During the Winter War, the building was vacant and under Swedish surveillance. Swedish diplomats lived in the building during the Continuation War. U.S. diplomat George F. Kennan moved in once the war was over.

There were allotments, as well as chickens and pigs, in the embassy yard from the late 1940s until the 1960s, when apartments for the staff began to be rented from elsewhere in the city.

The construction for the additional building for the embassy began once the Soviet Union dissolved and was completed in 1996.

== Ambassadors ==
=== Soviet Union ===
Representative	Year	Title
Anders Ahonen	1921	Representative
Eero Järnefelt	1921	Chargé d'Affaires
Karl Gyllenbögel	1921–1922	Chargé d'Affaires
Eero Järnefelt	1922–1923	Chargé d'Affaires
Antti Hackzell	1922–1927	Envoy
Pontus Artti	1927–1930	Envoy
Aarno Yrjö-Koskinen	1931–1939	Envoy
Juho Kusti Paasikivi	1940–1941	Envoy
Cay Sundström	1945–1953	Envoy
Åke Gartz	1953–1954	Envoy
Åke Gartz	1954–1955	Ambassador
Eero A. Wuori	1955–1963	Ambassador
Jorma Vanamo	1963–1967	Ambassador
Jaakko Hallama	1967–1970	Ambassador
Björn-Olof Alholm	1970–1974	Ambassador
Jaakko Hallama	1974–1982	Ambassador
Aarno Karhilo	1983–1988	Ambassador
Heikki Talvitie	1988–1992	Ambassador

=== Russia ===
Representative	Year	Title
Heikki Talvitie	1991–1992	Ambassador
Arto Mansala	1993–1996	Ambassador
Markus Lyra	1996–2000	Ambassador
René Nyberg	2000–2004	Ambassador
Harry Helenius	2004–2008	Ambassador
Matti Anttonen	2008–2012	Ambassador
Hannu Himanen	2012–2016	Ambassador
Mikko Hautala	2016–2020	Ambassador
Antti Helanterä	2020-2024	Ambassador
Marja Liivala	2024-	Ambassador

== See also ==
- Embassy of Russia, Helsinki
- Finland–Russia relations
- Diplomatic missions in Russia
- Moscow Finnish School
