= Embassy of Russia, Helsinki =

Russian Embassy in Finland

Coordinates: 60.1596°N 24.9529°E

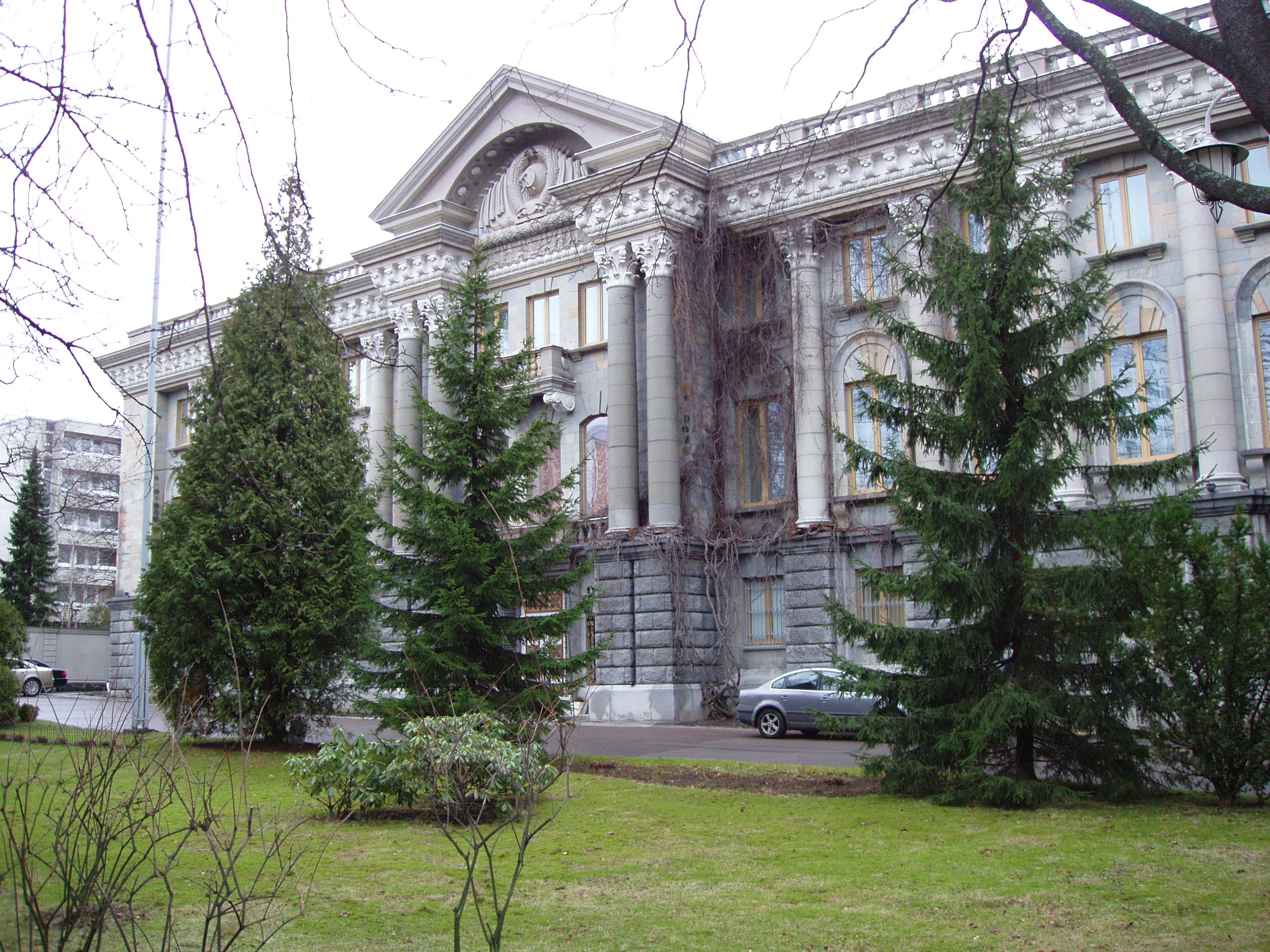
- The main building of the Russian Embassy on Tehtaankatu. Note the Soviet emblem bas-relief; it has not been removed since the dissolution of the Soviet Union in 1991.

The Embassy of the Russian Federation in Helsinki is the diplomatic mission of Russia to Finland. It is located in Ullanlinna at Tehtaankatu 1, in premises originally built for the Soviet Embassy. The name "Tehtaankatu" was in the past often used as a synonym for the Soviet Embassy. The embassy complex consists of the entire Kaulushaikara block. The site also contains newer buildings.

== Embassy staffing ==
Before the Russian invasion of Ukraine, there were 147 people working in the embassy. By summer 2023, that number had decreased to 112, of which 37 were diplomats. The embassy has caretakers, mechanics, electricians, plumbers, IT support staff and office assistants of its own– all of them Russian. The children of the embassy staff go to school in the former German Embassy, located 200 meters away.

The staff of the embassy include ambassador Pavel Kuznetsov and minister counselor Leonid Anisimov. Other employees include Russian military attaché, Colonel Eduard Grigoraš, who represents the Russian military intelligence; deputy military attaché Major Stepan Filatov, who has been registered with the GRU space intelligence division, as well as a representative of the Russian customs who has worked at the FSB information center.

According to an estimation by the Finnish Security and Intelligence Service, up to a third of the diplomats of the Russian Embassy are actually spies.

== Electronics ==
The roof of the embassy features at least 11 satellite dishes that are likely used to secure the communications of the employees and agents of the embassy, as well to monitor local radio- and mobile phone communication without authorization. There are also UHF and VHF radio monitoring antennae on the roof of the building.

Using a random wire antenna it is possible to send encrypted messages without the location of the receiver being revealed. The Yagi antenna at the corner facing Kaivopuisto can be used to monitor the communication of the administrative quarters in the city center. The Russian Embassy can, for example, monitor the use and location of mobile phones in downtown Helsinki.

== Other Russian government property ==
In addition to the embassy, Russia has the Russian Science and Culture Centre on Nordenskiöldinkatu in Taka-Töölö, a small apartment building in Taka-Töölö, a villa in Kulosaari, an office building on Vattuniemenkatu in Lauttasaari, and a residential building in Kuusisaari. In 2024, Finland's National Enforcement Authority begun seizing properties in Helsinki that belong to the Russian state. There seems to be no indication that the Russian Embassy will be part of the seizures.

== List of ambassadors ==
ambassador	year
Boris Aristov	1992 (1988–1991 USSR amb.)
Yuri Deryabin	1992–1996
Ivan Aboimov	1996–1999
Aleksandr Patsev	1999–2003
Vladimir Grinin	2003–2006
Aleksandr Rumjantsev	2006–2017
Pavel Kuznetsov	2017–

== See also ==
- Consulate of Russia, Åland
- Embassy of Finland, Moscow
- Finland–Russia relations
