= Finnbay =

Finnish-based media website

- Website type: Media website
- Available in: English
- Founded: 2013; 13 years ago
- Industry: News
- Website: www.finnbay.com
- Registration: Privileged
- Current status: Active

Finnbay is an English-language media website from Helsinki, Finland. The website covers politics, business, culture, entertainment, lifestyle, fashion, dating and personalities. Its online content is behind a paywall except for one free article every five days.

Finnbay claims that it "is not a chronicle of economics". Rather, it aims to cover the principles of Global Political Economy (GPE) and its sub-cultures.

== Editorial anonymity ==
Finnbay's articles take a definite editorial stance and almost never carry a byline. Not even the name of the editor is printed in the issue. The author of a piece is named in certain circumstances: when notable persons are invited to contribute opinion pieces. The editors say this is because, they consider the Economist as their role model and "anonymity enables the journalist not to be affected by their private relations with companies, politicians or others."

== Criticisms and controversy ==
In April 2014, Finnbay was prominently featured in Finnish media after it threatened to start legal action against the Finnish ambassador to Russia Hannu Himanen unless he made an apology. Himanen had claimed on Twitter that Finnbay featured a fictitious report on Finland's relations with Russia was "complete nonsense and grossly misrepresents Finland's position". The debate was further fuelled, when Helsingin Sanomat published an analysis by researcher Mika Aaltola at the Finnish Institute of International Affairs, according to whom the way Finnbay operated had similarities to an information warfare operation, with an aim to confuse public debate.

Johan Bäckman, a Finnish political author, said "Finnbay story about the Finnish attitude towards Russia is presented correctly. The country is formally in the EU, but Finland does not want to be involved in sanctions against Russia. I was surprised mainly to the fact that if someone writes about Finnish affairs in uncooperative manner, then most of often the writer is persecuted."

Minister of Defence for Finland Carl Haglund later said that it was unlikely that Finnbay was part of Russia's organised military propaganda. Neither Ministry of Foreign Affairs nor the Finnish security police (Supo) found any evidence of propaganda in the end.

Finnbay received several criticisms as the media website did not mention the name of its editor-in-chief, although this is required by Finnish law for both web and print news. In addition, the street address listed on the publication contact page does not exist. Finnbay however later deleted the invalid address and said that it did not want to reveal its physical address for security reasons due to having received threats from Finnish anti-immigration groups. Finnbay claimed to have an exclusive partnership with Italy's leading news agency ANSA and announced plans to start a print newspaper with the Russian-language Novosti Helsinki. But the news agency, when contacted, denied the existence of any exclusive partnership agreement apart from general content partnership with itself and Finnbay, and the editor-in-chief of Novosti Helsinki said that the extent of co-operation between Novosti Helsinki and Finnbay was limited to content exchange. The editor-in-chief of Novosti Helsinki characterised Finnbay's writers as "a group of enthusiastic hobbyists".
