= Heikki Talvitie =

Finnish diplomat (born 1939)

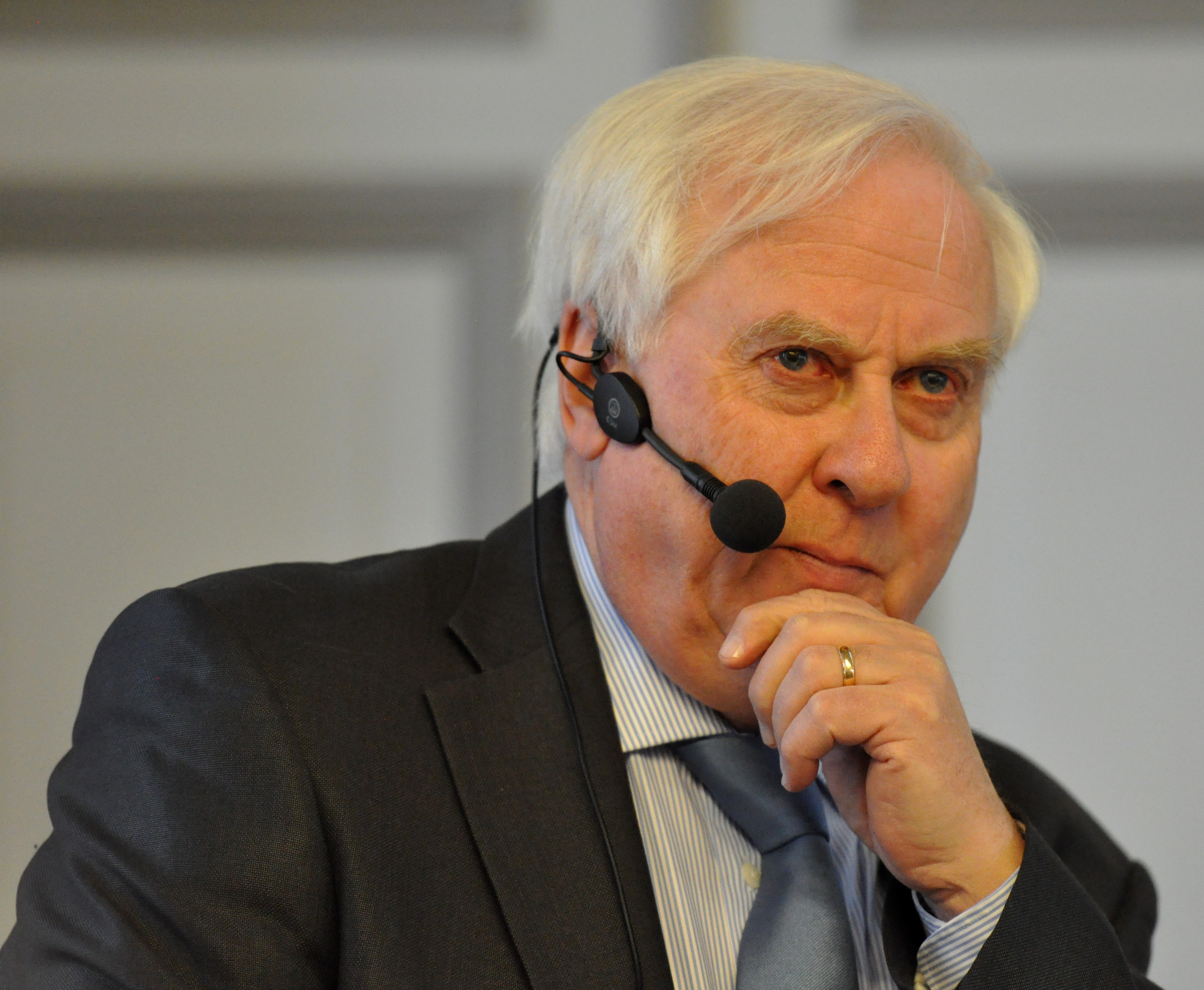
- Born: September 5, 1939 (age 86)

Heikki Talvitie (born 5 September 1939) is a Finnish diplomat. He has served as Ambassador in Belgrade from 1984 to 1988, in Moscow from 1988 to 1992 and from Stockholm in 1996–2002. Talvitie has also been an EU Special Representative in the Caucasus and an OSCE Special Envoy in Georgia.

Talvitie was born in Viipuri, graduated from the University of Helsinki in 1963 and joined the Ministry for Foreign Affairs in 1964. In addition to the ambassador's duties, he worked at The Hague Embassy and at the United Nations Office in New York. He was a Minister Counselor in Moscow from 1976 to 1980. Office of the Ministry of Foreign Affairs 1980–1982. Consultative Officer for the Ministry of Foreign Affairs 1983–1984

Talvitie is a well-known Soviet expert. He worked extensively at the Political Department of the Ministry of Foreign Affairs and from April 1, 1971 with a report department where there was plenty of secret and other material from Finnish embassies around the world. He was appointed to the UN Representation on September 1, 1972.

Talvitie has been the chairman of the Finnish Museums Association since 2003. Talvitie was President of the Finnish-Russian Society 2002–2014 and chairman of the society's council since 2014– and President of the Union of Friends of History since 2000

Docent Jukka Seppinen accuses Talvitie of favoring pro Soviet officials and that according to Seppinen Talvitie did not attempt to defeat the influence of KGB in Finland.

Translator-writer Jukka Mallinen has once again accused Talvitie of having his chairman period of taking the Finnish-Russian Society towards the Kremlins handshake and voice

Talvitie has commented on the media's Russian military operations in Georgia in 2008 and in Ukraine in 2014.

Helsingin Sanomat has criticized Talvitie for his defenses of the Russian invasion in the Crimea.

On August 18, 2014, Russian President Vladimir Putin rewarded Talvitie's Friendship with the Honor of strengthening friendship and Cooperation with Russia.
