= Antti Karppinen =

Finnish Foreign Affairs Counselor and ambassador

Antti Karppinen (6 May 1923 Altona, Germany - May 16, 2015 Helsinki) was a Finnish Foreign Affairs Counselor and former Ambassador.

Karppinen was born in Altona, where the family had been living where his father worked after years spent in Russia. Karppinen's father was working in Latvia in 1927-1941 and the family lived in Riga.

Karppinen first went to school in Riga and then in Berlin where she graduated as an undergraduate student. During the Continuation War 1942-1944 he served in the Finnish Defense Forces. He graduated in 1954 as a Bachelor of Philosophy from the University of Helsinki and went to the Ministry of Foreign Affairs for the same year.

Karppinen served as Minister Counselor at the Embassy of Finland in Moscow, 1968-1971, and Consul General in Leningrad 1973-1980. Thereafter, he was Ambassador in Prague 1980-1985 and in Bonn 1985-1990.

Retired Karppinen wrote 1999-2006 a three-part series of Idea of Russia series and worked as a Russian expert at the Ministry of Foreign Affairs and the Aleksanteri Institute of the University of Helsinki. In 2011, he received the Honorary Doctor's degree in the promotion of the Faculty of Political Science at the University of Helsinki.
