= Anttonen =

Anttonen is a Finnish surname. Notable people with the surname include:

- Matti Anttonen (born 1957), Finnish diplomat
- Patrik Anttonen (born 1980), Swedish footballer
- Sari Anttonen (born 1991), Finnish orienteering competitor
