= Federal Agency on Atomic Energy (Russia) =

Former Russian federal executive body in 1992-2008

Ministry for Atomic Energy of the Russian Federation and Federal Agency on Atomic Energy (or Rosatom), were a Russian federal executive body from 1992–2008 (as Federal Ministry in 1992–2004 and as Federal Agency in 2004–2008).

The Ministry for Atomic Energy of the Russian Federation (Russian: Министерство по атомной энергии Российской Федерации), or MinAtom (МинАтом), was established on January 29, 1992 as a successor of the Ministry of Nuclear Engineering and Industry of the USSR.

On March 9, 2004, it was reorganized as the Federal Agency on Atomic Energy.

According to the law adopted by the Russian parliament in November 2007, and signed by the President Putin in early December, the agency was transformed to a Russian state corporation (non-profit organisation), the Rosatom Nuclear Energy State Corporation.

== Heads ==
- Viktor Mikhaylov (1992–1998)
- Yevgeny Adamov (1998–2001)
- Alexander Rumyantsev (2001–2005)
- Sergey Kiriyenko (2005–2007)

== See also ==
- Ministry of Medium Machine Building of the USSR, Soviet ministry in charge of civil nuclear activities in the USSR
- Nuclear power in Russia
- Institute for Theoretical and Experimental Physics
- Institute for High Energy Physics
- Atomenergoprom, civil nuclear activities including Tekhsnabexport (fuel/uranium exporter), Energoatom
- Energy policy of Russia
