= Consulate of Russia, Åland =

Consulate of the Russian Federation in Åland Консульство Российской Федерации на Аландских островах в Финляндии
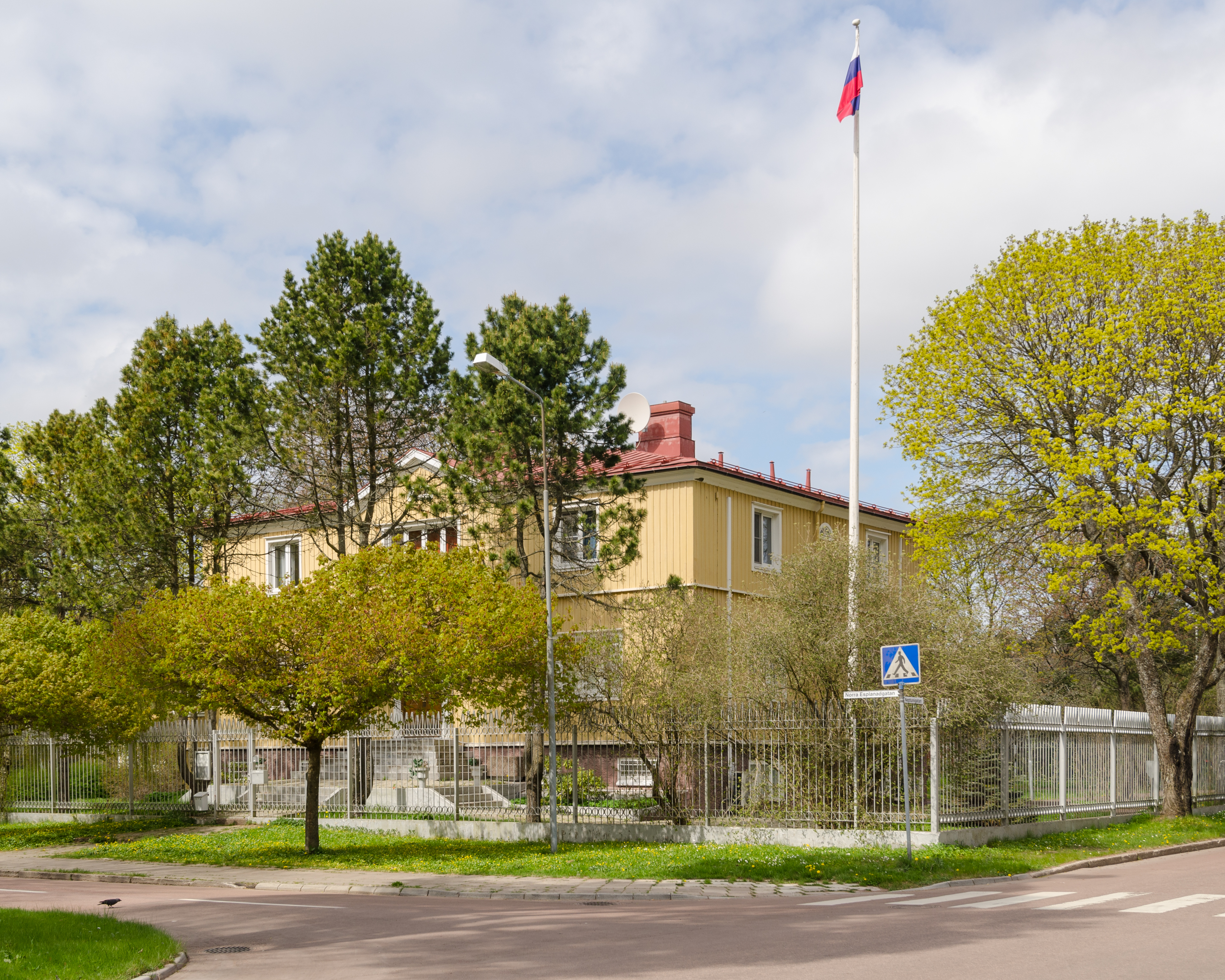
- Address: 11 Norra Esplanadgatan, AX-22100 Mariehamn, Åland Islands
- Opened: 1940
- Jurisdiction: Åland
- Consul General: Alexander Rogov
- Website: https://konsaland.mid.ru/ru/

The Consulate of the Russian Federation in Åland is a Russian diplomatic mission in Finland's autonomous Åland region. The consulate is located in Åland's capital, Mariehamn, and is subordinate to the Russian Embassy in Helsinki. Under the 1940 Moscow Peace Treaty between Finland and the Soviet Union, the consulate was granted, in addition to customary consular duties, a role in monitoring the demilitarization of Åland. This function has been inherited by the Russian Federation as the Soviet Union's legal successor. The current consul is Alexander Rogov.

== History ==
=== Soviet era (1940–1992) ===
Following the conclusion of the Winter War in 1940, The Soviet Union and Finland signed a treaty concerning the status of the Åland Islands. The treaty requires Finland to demilitarize Åland and ensure no Finnish or foreign military presence is ever established on the islands. Article 3 of this treaty granted the Soviet Union the right to maintain a diplomatic office in Åland to monitor Finland's treaty obligation to keep Åland demilitarized.

According to the treaty, if a Soviet consular representative believes the demilitarization of Åland is being violated, he has the right to notify the Finnish authorities to perform a joint investigation. The results of any investigation will be published in Finnish and Russian.

In 1961 the consulate helped arrange a sister city agreement between Lomonosov and Mariehamn.

In October 1987 the consulate assisted with the defection of Swedish citizen Stig Bergling, who spied for the Soviet Union. Stig Berling had managed to escape Swedish custody after being imprisoned for espionage and made his way to the Soviet consulate in the Åland Islands. The consulate directed Berling to the Soviet embassy in Helsinki, which ultimately allowed him to make it to the Soviet Union and defect.

=== Russian Federation ===
After the dissolution of the Soviet Union, the Russian Federation inherited the consulate property in Åland and the 1940 treaty. In 1998, Russia proposed to Finland that the consulate in Mariehamn be closed and that its supervisory responsibilities over Åland be transferred to the Russian consulate in Turku, citing economic reasons. The Finnish government rejected the proposal, as it did not want to risk reopening negotiations on the 1940 treaty.

As of 2023, the only known occupants of the consulate are Consul Alexander Rogov and his wife.

=== 2022 invasion of Ukraine ===
Following Russia's 2022 invasion of Ukraine, the consulate has come under increased scrutiny from the Finnish government and Finnish society.

The Russian Ministry of Foreign Affairs stated that on May 1, 2023, an "explosive noise device" and other objects were thrown on the consulate's property, allegedly causing damage. The Russian Embassy in Helsinki sent a diplomatic note to the Finnish Ministry for Foreign Affairs, demanding that those responsible be prosecuted and requesting increased security for the consulate.

In April 2023, a petition requesting the closure of the consulate was launched by Finnish citizens. The initiative received more than the required 50,000 signatures, but was not taken up by the Parliament of Finland, as Finnish law does not permit citizens’ initiatives concerning international treaties.

In response to Russia's closure of multiple Finnish diplomatic missions, former Finnish ambassador to Moscow, Hannu Himanen, suggested that Finland close the consulate on Åland on the basis of diplomatic reciprocity. On June 1, 2023, the Prime Minister of Finland, Petteri Orpo, described the consulate as a "historical relic". An investigation into the legal foundation of Åland's special status and the Russian consulate, commissioned by the Finnish Ministry for Foreign Affairs, was published in November 2023. The report concluded that Finland cannot unilaterally close the consulate under customary international law.

== See also ==
- Finland-Russia relations
- List of diplomatic missions of Russia
- List of diplomatic missions in Finland
