= List of diplomatic missions in Finland =

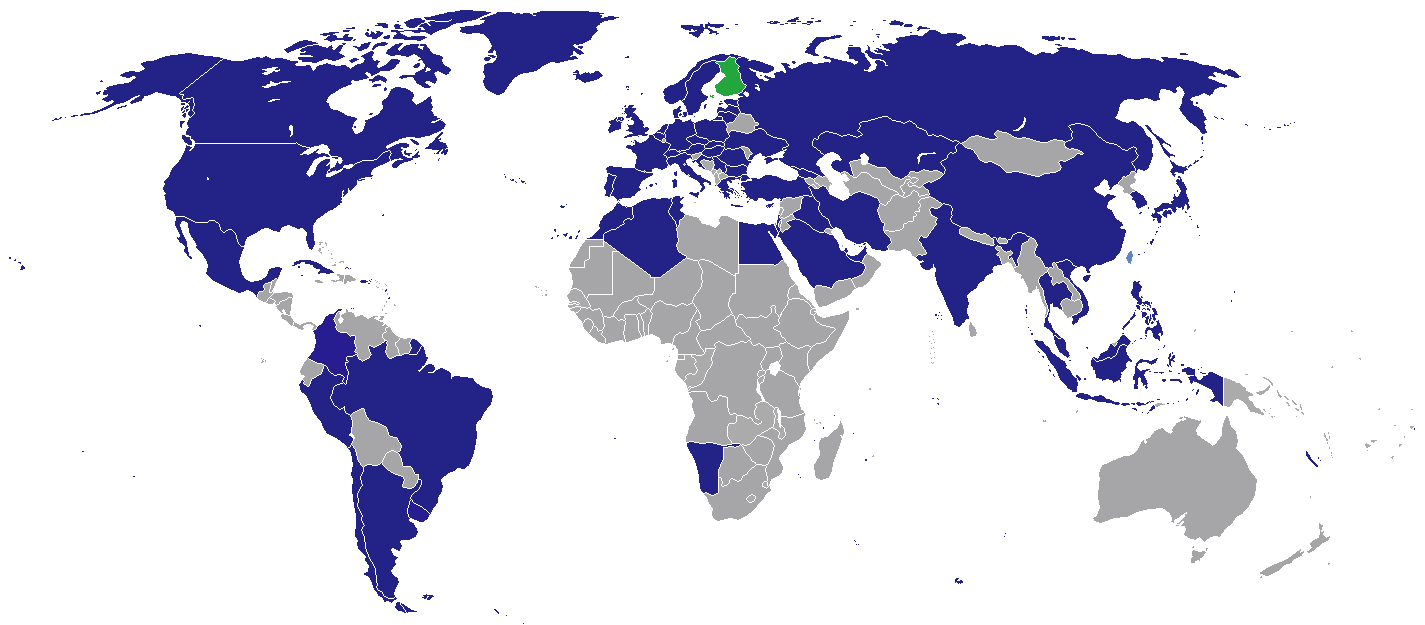
Map of diplomatic missions in Finland

This article lists diplomatic missions resident in Finland. At present, the capital Helsinki hosts 63 embassies. Several other countries accredit ambassadors from other regional capitals, such as Oslo, Stockholm, London, Paris, Berlin, Brussels, Copenhagen and Moscow.

Honorary consulates are excluded from this listing.

== Diplomatic missions in Helsinki ==
| Country | Mission type | Photo |
|---|---|---|
| Algeria | Embassy | |
| Argentina | Embassy | |
| Austria | Embassy | |
| Belgium | Embassy | |
| Brazil | Embassy | |
| Bulgaria | Embassy | |
| Canada | Embassy | |
| Chile | Embassy | |
| China | Embassy | |
| Colombia | Embassy | |
| Croatia | Embassy | |
| Cuba | Embassy | |
| Cyprus | Embassy | |
| Czech Republic | Embassy | |
| Denmark | Embassy | |
| Egypt | Embassy | |
| Estonia | Embassy | |
| France | Embassy | |
| Georgia | Embassy | |
| Germany | Embassy | |
| Greece | Embassy | |
| Hungary | Embassy | |
| Iceland | Embassy | |
| India | Embassy | |
| Indonesia | Embassy | |
| Iran | Embassy | |
| Iraq | Embassy | |
| Ireland | Embassy | |
| Israel | Embassy | |
| Italy | Embassy | |
| Japan | Embassy | |
| Kazakhstan | Embassy | |
| Latvia | Embassy | |
| Lithuania | Embassy | |
| Malaysia | Embassy | |
| Mexico | Embassy | |
| Morocco | Embassy | |
| Namibia | Embassy | |
| Netherlands | Embassy | |
| Northern Cyprus | Representative Office | |
| Norway | Embassy | |
| Palestine | Representative Office | |
| Peru | Embassy | |
| Philippines | Embassy | |
| Poland | Embassy | |
| Portugal | Embassy | |
| Qatar | Embassy | |
| Romania | Embassy | |
| Russia | Embassy | |
| Saudi Arabia | Embassy | |
| Serbia | Embassy | |
| Slovakia | Embassy | |
| Republic of Korea | Embassy | |
| Spain | Embassy | |
| Sweden | Embassy | |
| Switzerland | Embassy | |
| Republic of China (Taiwan) | Taipei Representative Office | |
| Thailand | Embassy | |
| Tunisia | Embassy | |
| Turkey | Embassy | |
| Ukraine | Embassy | |
| United Arab Emirates | Embassy | |
| United Kingdom | Embassy | |
| United States | Embassy | |
| Uruguay | Embassy | |
| Vietnam | Embassy | |

== Consulates in Finland ==
| Country | Mission type | City | Photo |
|---|---|---|---|
| Russia | Consulate | Mariehamn | |
| Sweden | Consulate-General | Mariehamn | |

== Non-resident embassies accredited to Finland ==
=== Resident in Berlin, Germany ===
1. Bahrain
2. Brunei
3. Burundi
4. Cape Verde
5. Jordan
6. Kyrgyzstan
7. Liberia
8. Maldives
9. Mali
10. Myanmar
11. Oman
12. Paraguay
13. Yemen

=== Resident in Brussels, Belgium ===
1. Barbados
2. Bhutan
3. Central African Republic
4. Guinea-Bissau
5. Honduras
6. Mauritania
7. São Tomé and Príncipe

=== Resident in Copenhagen, Denmark ===
1. Burkina Faso
2. Ivory Coast
3. Luxembourg
4. Nepal
5. Niger
6. Slovenia
7. Uganda

=== Resident in London, United Kingdom ===
1. Cambodia
2. Cameroon
3. Congo-Kinshasa
4. Eswatini
5. Gabon
6. Gambia
7. Jamaica
8. Madagascar
9. Malawi
10. Mauritius
11. Saint Vincent and the Grenadines
12. Seychelles
13. Sierra Leone
14. Trinidad and Tobago
15. Turkmenistan

=== Resident in Moscow, Russia ===
1. Chad
2. Congo-Brazzaville
3. Djibouti
4. Guinea

=== Resident in Oslo, Norway ===
1. Ghana
2. South Sudan
3. Venezuela

=== Resident in Stockholm, Sweden ===
1. Afghanistan
2. Albania
3. Angola
4. Armenia
5. Australia
6. Azerbaijan
7. Bangladesh
8. Belarus
9. Bolivia
10. Bosnia and Herzegovina
11. Botswana
12. Dominican Republic
13. Ecuador
14. El Salvador
15. Eritrea
16. Ethiopia
17. Guatemala
18. Holy See
19. Kenya
20. Kosovo
21. Kuwait
22. Laos
23. Lebanon
24. Libya
25. Moldova
26. Mongolia
27. Mozambique
28. New Zealand
29. Nigeria
30. North Korea
31. North Macedonia
32. Pakistan
33. Panama
34. Rwanda
35. South Africa
36. Sri Lanka
37. Sudan
38. Syria
39. Tanzania
40. Zambia
41. Zimbabwe

=== Other cities ===
1. Andorra (Andorra la Vella)
2. Benin (Paris)
3. Comoros (Paris)
4. Guyana (Geneva)
5. Lesotho (Dublin)
6. Malta (Valletta)
7. Montenegro (Podgorica)
8. San Marino (City of San Marino)
9. Senegal (The Hague)
10. Singapore (Singapore)
11. Suriname (The Hague)
12. Tajikistan (Minsk)
13. Uzbekistan (Riga)

== Closed missions ==
=== Embassies in Helsinki ===
- Belarus (closed in 2026)
- Nicaragua
- North Korea (closed in 1998)
- Slovenia (closed in 2012)
- South Africa (closed in 2021)
- Venezuela

=== Consulates general in Helsinki ===
- Sweden (closed in 1918)

=== Consulates general in Turku ===
- Russia (closed in 2023)

== See also ==
- Foreign relations of Finland
- Visa requirements for Finnish citizens
