= List of ambassadors of Russia to Finland =

Ambassador of the Russian Federation to Finland
- Emblem of the Russian Foreign Ministry

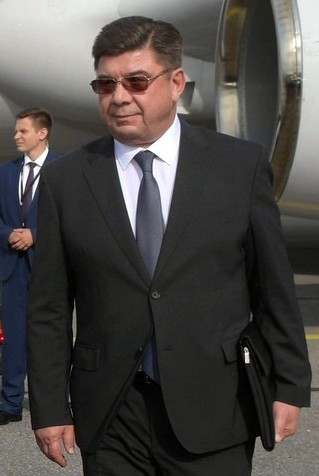
- Incumbent; Pavel Kuznetsov since 14 August 2017
- Ministry of Foreign Affairs; Embassy of Russia in Helsinki
- Style: His Excellency; The Honourable
- Reports to: Minister of Foreign Affairs
- Seat: Helsinki
- Appointer: President of Russia
- Term length: At the pleasure of the president
- Website: Embassy of Russia in Helsinki

The ambassador extraordinary and plenipotentiary of the Russian Federation to Finland is the official representative of the president and the government of the Russian Federation to the president and the government of Finland.

The ambassador and his staff work at large in the Embassy of Russia in Helsinki. There are consuls in Mariehamn and Kuusamo. Turku was home to a Russian consulate general until 2023, when the Finnish government withdrew its consent for the office's operation in response to Russia’s decision to close Finland’s consulate general in St. Petersburg. Pavel Kuznetsov was appointed Russian ambassador to Finland on 14 August 2017.

== History of diplomatic relations ==
The territory now making up present-day Finland was contested between Russians and Swedes for much of the seventeenth and eighteenth centuries, until the Finnish War of 1808-1809 established the Grand Duchy of Finland as an autonomous part of the Russian Empire. Finland had her own parliament, the Diet, minted her own currency, and shared a customs border with Russia. The Finnish language was given official status alongside Russian and Swedish.

Finland declared independence on 6 December 1917, after the Russian Revolution that year, a decision which was ratified by the Russian government on 31 December 1917. The declaration soon sparked a civil war between White and Red factions. The Russian Soviet Federative Socialist Republic (RSFSR) appointed representatives to the Red faction during the war, until their defeat. Relations were then established between the Finnish government and the RSFSR at the level of missions on 31 December 1920. With the formal establishment of the Soviet Union, diplomatic relations were maintained between the USSR and Finland from 23 July 1923 onwards.

Diplomatic relations between the two states were broken off several times during the twentieth century. The first came on 29 November 1939 with the outbreak of the Winter War between the USSR and Finland. With the negotiated conclusion to the war, diplomatic relations resumed on 12 March 1940. Relations were once more interrupted on 22 June 1941, with the Axis invasion of the Soviet Union and Finland's participation on the Eastern Front against Soviet forces as part of the Continuation War. With the defeat of the Axis powers in the Second World War, diplomatic relations were once more reestablished on 6 August 1945, and on 18 July 1954 the mission was upgraded to the level of an embassy. Following the dissolution of the Soviet Union in 1991, Finland recognized the Russia Federation as its successor state on 30 December 1991, and ambassadors have continued to be exchanged between the two countries.

In the 2000s, Finland–Russia relations were marked by both pragmatic cooperation and increasing geopolitical tension. Finland remained outside NATO but maintained close ties with Western security structures, while also engaging in cross-border cooperation with Russia in areas such as trade, energy, and transport. Relations began to deteriorate following Russia’s annexation of Crimea in 2014 and further worsened with the full-scale Russian invasion of Ukraine in February 2022. Finland strongly condemned Russia's actions and supported EU sanctions against Moscow. As a result of the war, Finland reassessed its security policy, culminating in its application for NATO membership in 2022 and accession in April 2023. The move was strongly opposed by Russia, which called it a threat to its national security.

== List of representatives (1917–present) ==
=== Russian Soviet Federative Socialist Republic to Finland (1917–1923) ===
Name	Title	Appointment	Termination	Notes
Ivar Smilga	Representative	16 February 1918	1918	To the Finnish Socialist Workers' Republic only
Konstantin Kovanko	Representative	9 April 1918	23 May 1918	Not recognised by the Finnish government
Jan Berzin	Plenipotentiary	16 February 1921	24 June 1921	
Aleksey Chernykh	Plenipotentiary	31 July 1921	23 July 1923	

=== Union of Soviet Socialist Republics to Finland (1923–1991) ===
Name	Title	Appointment	Termination	Notes
Aleksey Chernykh	Plenipotentiary	23 July 1923	9 July 1925	
Ivan Lorents	Plenipotentiary	9 July 1925	6 July 1927	
Sergey Aleksandrovsky	Plenipotentiary	6 July 1927	16 May 1929	
Ivan Maisky	Plenipotentiary	16 May 1929	27 September 1932	
Boris Shtein	Plenipotentiary	6 January 1933	25 November 1934	
Eric Assmus	Plenipotentiary	23 January 1935	20 August 1937	
Vladimir Derevyansky	Plenipotentiary	27 January 1938	29 November 1939	
Winter War - Diplomatic relations interrupted (1939 - 1940)
Ivan Zotov	Plenipotentiary	6 April 1940	6 April 1941	
Pavel Orlov	Plenipotentiary; Envoy after 9 May 1941	11 April 1941	22 June 1941	
Continuation War - Diplomatic relations interrupted (1941 - 1945)
Pavel Orlov	Envoy	18 August 1945	14 August 1946	
Aleksandr Abramov	Envoy	14 August 1946	13 January 1948	
Grigory Savonenkov	Envoy	13 January 1948	8 April 1951	
Viktor Lebedev	Envoy; Ambassador after 5 August 1954	8 April 1951	10 October 1958	
Night Frost Crisis - Diplomatic relations interrupted (1958 - 1959)
Aleksey Zakharov	Ambassador	4 February 1959	23 January 1965	
Andrey Kovalyov	Ambassador	23 January 1965	25 June 1970	
Aleksey Belyakov	Ambassador	25 June 1970	16 May 1971	
Viktor Maltsev	Ambassador	16 May 1971	27 December 1973	
Vladimir Stepanov	Ambassador	27 December 1973	11 June 1979	
Vladimir Sobolev	Ambassador	11 June 1979	17 June 1988	
Boris Aristov	Ambassador	17 June 1988	25 December 1991	

=== Russian Federation to Finland (1991–present) ===
Name	Title	Appointment	Termination	Notes
Boris Aristov	Ambassador	25 December 1991	10 February 1992	
Yuri Deryabin	Ambassador	10 February 1992	2 November 1996	
Ivan Aboimov	Ambassador	2 November 1996	6 August 1999	
Aleksandr Patsev	Ambassador	25 August 1999	21 April 2003	
Vladimir Grinin	Ambassador	21 April 2003	21 April 2006	
Alexander Rumyantsev	Ambassador	21 April 2006	14 August 2017	
Pavel Kuznetsov	Ambassador	14 August 2017		
