= Himanen =

Himanen is a Finnish surname. Notable people with the surname include:

- Hannu Himanen (born 1951), Finnish diplomat
- Kairi Himanen (born 1992), Estonian footballer
- Pekka Himanen (born 1973), Finnish philosopher
