= Demilitarisation of Åland =

Åland is demilitarised, meaning that no military forces may be stationed on the islands and that they may not be fortified. Åland is also neutralised, and must therefore be kept outside armed conflict in the event of war. The demilitarisation of Åland is based on multiple international treaties as well as on customary international law.

Åland is situated in a strategically important location in the Baltic Sea. It dominates the entrance to the Gulf of Bothnia, while also lying in close proximity to Stockholm, the capital of Sweden.

The demilitarisation of Åland was first imposed on Russia after the Crimean War through the Åland convention of 1856, which was incorporated as an appendix to the 1856 Paris Peace Treaty. At that time, Åland formed part of the Grand Duchy of Finland within the Russian Empire.

During the First World War, Russia fortified Åland with consent of the other Entente powers. After the October Revolution, various armed forces were present on the islands. After the Finnish independence in 1917, a dispute over Åland arose between Finland and Sweden. In 1921, the League of Nations decided that the islands would remain under Finnish sovereignty as an autonomous region. Following this decision, the Åland Neutralisation Convention (or Åland convention of 1921) was signed, in which Finland reaffirmed the 1856 convention, now expanded to include neutralisation of the islands.

During the Winter War between Finland and Soviet Union, Finnish troops were deployed on the islands without protest from the states party to the 1921 convention. After the war, the 1940 Moscow Peace Treaty required Finland to again demilitarise the islands, and also granted the Soviet Union (later Russia) the right to maintain a diplomatic office in Åland to monitor the demilitarisation. After the Continuation War, the demilitarisation was reaffirmed in the 1947 Paris Peace Treaty.

In 1992, following the dissolution of the Soviet Union, Finland and Russia affirmed that the provisions of the 1940 treaty concerning Åland remain in force.

== History ==
=== Under Russian Empire ===
After Åland was transferred from Sweden to the Russian Empire in 1809, Russia undertook extensive fortification of the archipelago. The construction of the Bomarsund Fortress on the eastern side of the main island started in early 1830s. Great Britain, the leading naval power of the period, regarded the fortification of Åland as a hostile act, and lodged a formal protest. In 1854, during the Crimean War (1853–1856), the fortress was destroyed by British and French forces, and in the aftermath of the war, Britain and France imposed a convention on Russia concerning the demilitarisation of Åland. Under this convention, which was incorporated as an appendix to the 1856 Paris Peace Treaty, the islands were to remain unfortified, and no permanent military or naval bases were to be established there.

In the following years, Russia did not construct any fortifications on Åland and maintained only a small guard on the islands. Between 1863 and 1912, Russia made numerous attempts to have the 1856 convention, regarded as humiliating, abolished. In the early 20th century, despite being unable to fortify Åland, Russia began constructing an extensive system of naval fortifications on both sides of the Gulf of Finland to protect Saint Petersburg.

After World War I broke out in 1914, Russia started building fortresses on Åland to guard against a potential attack by the German Empire, with a tacit consent of Britain, France, and Sweden. Ten fortresses were built, and 12000 men were stationed on the islands. The primary purpose of the fortifications was to prevent a German landing on Åland or in the Archipelago Sea near Turku. Åland also served as a base for offensive operations against Germany in the Baltic Sea.

=== Under independent Finland ===
Following the February Revolution in Russia, and the outbreak of the Finnish Civil War in January 1918, the Ålanders turned to Sweden for protection, and Swedish forces landed on Åland in February 1918. At the same time, Russian troops, White Guards from Uusikaupunki (Nystad), and Red Guards were present on the islands. In March 1918, Germany and Russia signed the Treaty of Brest-Litovsk, under which Russian troops withdrew from Finland. A German naval force arrived on Åland and the islands were cleared of Russian forces. The last Swedish forces left Åland in May 1918. The German forces, in their turn, left the islands after Germany's defeat in World War I. The fortifications on the islands were demolished in 1919 due to an agreement between Finland, Sweden and Germany.

When Finland declared independence from Russia in 1917, it initially held that the 1856 convention did not apply to the new Finnish state. When the League of Nations resolved the issue of Åland's constitutional affiliation in 1921, a decision was also taken to draw up an international convention. The convention, which confirmed the demilitarisation of 1856 and also neutralised Åland, was signed by ten states. Russia is not a party to the 1921 convention, but the 1940 Moscow Treaty on the Åland Islands and the 1947 Paris Peace Treaty contain provisions on the demilitarisation of Åland. Neutralisation is not mentioned, however.

Those who have right of domicile and moved to Åland before the age 12 are exempt from military service.

== Bibliography ==
- Kansainvälisoikeudellinen selvitys Ahvenanmaan kansainvälisestä erityisasemasta ja Venäjän Maarianhaminan-konsulinvirastoon liittyvistä oikeudellisista kysymyksistä [An international-law analysis of Åland's international special status and the legal issues related to the Russian Consulate in Mariehamn] (Report) (in Finnish). Helsinki: Ulkoministeriö. 2023. ISBN 978-952-281-385-5.
- Hannikainen, Lauri Antero (1994). "The Continued Validity of the Demilitarised and Neutralised Status of the Åland Islands" (PDF). Zeitschrift für ausländisches öffentliches Recht und Völkerrecht. 54 (3/4): 614–651. ISSN 0044-2348.
- Komulainen, Arvo (2005). Taistelu Ahvenanmaasta (in Finnish). Helsingissä: Ajatus Kirjat. ISBN 951-20-6796-X.
- Barros, James (1968). The Åland Islands Question: Its Settlement by the League of Nations. New Haven: Yale University Press.
