= Mallinen =

Mallinen or Mällinen is a Finnish surname. Notable people with the surname include:

- Michael Mällinen (born 1958), American racing driver
- Jukka Mallinen (born 1950), Finnish translator, author and interpreter
