= Viktor Mikhaylov (academic) =

Russian physicist

- Виктор Михайлов
- Born: Viktor Nikitovich Mikhaylov; February 12, 1934; Sapronovo, Moscow Oblast, RSFSR, Soviet Union
- Died: June 25, 2011 (aged 77)
- Resting place: Vagankovo Cemetery
- Citizenship: USSR, Russia
- Education: National Research Nuclear University MEPhI (Moscow Engineering Physics Institute)
- Scientific career
- Fields: Nuclear physics
- Workplaces: All-Russian Scientific Research Institute of Experimental Physics
- Academic advisors: Yakov Zeldovich

Viktor Nikitovich Mikhaylov (Russian: Виктор Никитович Михайлов; February 12, 1934 – June 25, 2011) was a Soviet and Russian nuclear scientist and government minister. From 1969 to 1988 Mikhaylov directed the Research Institute of Nuclear Impulse Technology. He personally oversaw more than 100 nuclear experiments during his directorship and spent over nine years at the Semipalatinsk and Novaya Zemlya test sites. In 1992, Mikhaylov was selected to head the newly formed Ministry of Atomic Energy, or MinAtom (now Rosatom). Under his tenure Russia maintained its nuclear infrastructure and saw an increase in international cooperation on atomic energy growth. Starting in 1999, Mikhaylov led the Institute of Strategic Stability, and from 1992 to 2007 he was chairman of Rosatom's nuclear consulting division and manager of the Federal center for Nuclear Research. He was also the bearer of many other titles: Academician of RAS (1997) and of RARAN, Doctor of Engineering (1976), professor (1984) and Founder of the School of Explosive Fission Physics and Penetration Radiation Single Pulse Diagnostics.

== Biography ==
Mikhaylov graduated with honors from Moscow Engineering Physics Institute (1952–1958) with a degree in Theoretical Nuclear Physics. After graduating from the Moscow Engineering Physics Institute in 1958, he entered the theoretical department of KB-11 (now RFNC – VNIIEF), where he achieved success in creating new models of nuclear and thermonuclear charges. He worked at VNIIEF until 1969.

In 1969–1988, he worked at the Research Institute of Impulse Technology (NIIIT), and was director since 1987. He earned his Candidate of Physical and Mathematical Sciences degree in (1968). During this time he was also a lead negotiator during the Joint Verification Experiment portion of the Threshold Test Ban Treaty, successfully negotiating the procedure for Touchstone Kearsarge.

Beginning in 1988, he was Deputy Minister of Medium Machine Building of the USSR for the nuclear weapons complex, then Deputy Minister of Atomic Energy and Industry of the USSR. He was RF Minister for Atomic Energy from 1992 to 1998, and a member of the RF Security Council.

He was First Deputy Minister of the Russian Federation for Atomic Energy from 1998 to 1999.

Mikhaylov was scientific director of the Russian Federal Nuclear Center – All-Russian Scientific Research Institute of Experimental Physics (RFNC-VNIIEF) from 1992 to 2007. In 1999, he became director of the Institute for Strategic Stability.

He was a member of the Russian Pugwash Committee (since 2002, and since 2009 – member of the Presidium).

Mikhaylov died on June 25, 2011, at the age of 78. He was buried at the Vagankovo Cemetery in Moscow.

== Awards ==
- Order of the Badge of Honour (1962)
- Lenin Prize (1967)
- Order of the Red Banner of Labour (1974)
- USSR State Prize (1982)
- Order "For Merit to the Fatherland", 3rd class (1995)
- State Prize of the Russian Federation (1997)
- Order of Honour (2005)
- Sholokhov International Prize in the field of literature and art (2009)

Preceded by post established	Federal Agency on Atomic Energy (Russia); March 2, 1992 – March 2, 1998	Succeeded by Yevgeny Adamov
