= Jaakko Hallama =

Finnish diplomat (1917–1996)

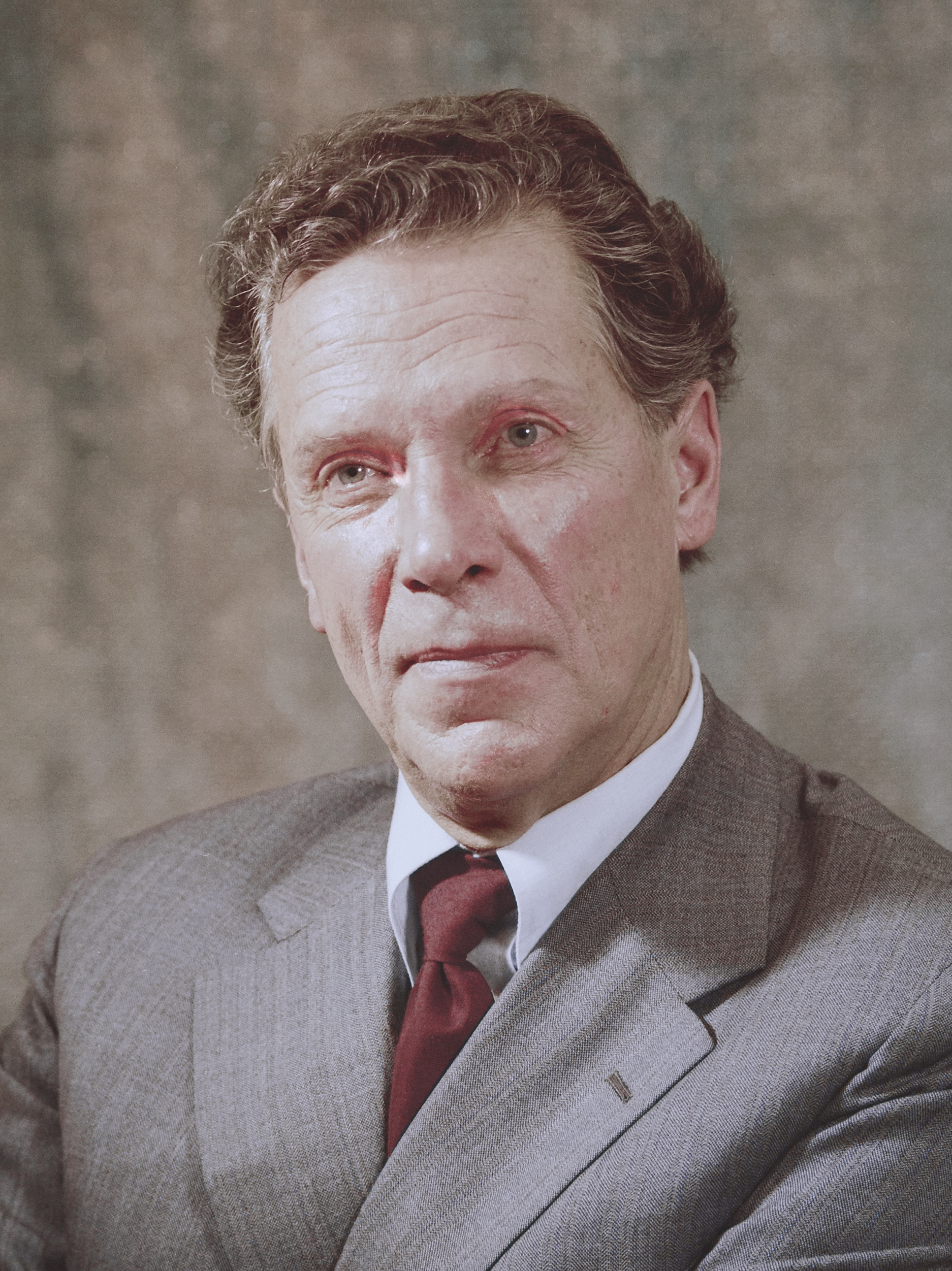
- Hallama in 1979

Minister of Foreign Affairs
- In office 18 December 1963 – 12 September 1964
- Prime Minister: Reino R. Lehto
- Preceded by: Veli Merikoski
- Succeeded by: Ahti Karjalainen

Personal details
- Born: Eino Jaakko Untamo Hallama; 28 March 1917 Kuopio, Finland
- Died: 11 February 1996 (aged 78) Helsinki, Finland
- Occupation: Diplomat

Eino Jaakko Untamo Hallama (until 1934 Airaksinen; 28 March 1917 Kuopio – 11 February 1996 Helsinki) was a Finnish diplomat and a longtime Ambassador of Finland to Moscow, who served as minister for foreign affairs in the Lehto caretaker government from 1963 to 1964.

Hallama's parents were a lawyer, Eino Arvid Airaksinen, a lawyer and a kindergarten teacher, Inga Kajsi Hallman. He spent some of his childhood and youth in Viipuri. After divorcing his parents, Jaakko took up his mother's maiden name when he was 16 years old. He translated it from Hallman to Hallama.

He graduated from Kuopio lyceum in 1936, studied at Cambridge University in 1938 and graduated in Finland as a Bachelor of Philosophy in 1941. In 1960 he received a Special Envoy and a Plenipotentiary Minister.

Hallama has been employed by the Ministry for Foreign Affairs since 1941. He served as Assistant to the Ministry from 1941 to 1943, Assistant to Bern in 1943-1945 and as a Chamber Secretary in 1945–1948.

Hallama served as secretary of state in Brussels from 1948 to 1949 and in Washington from 1949 to 1952 and then as a division officer in 1952-1954 and as counselor in Moscow 1954–1958.

He served as director general for political affairs in the Ministry of Foreign Affairs from 1959 to 1962, secretary of state from 1962 to 1967, ambassador to Moscow in 1967-1970 and 1974-1982 and Copenhagen (1970-1974).

As Secretary of State for Foreign Affairs, Hallama was forced into resign at the middle of a Note crisis in the fall of 1961, and his role in the settlement was later a huge controversy. Hallama first visited with Foreign Minister Ahti Karjalainen in Moscow and eventually with President Urho Kekkonen in Novosibirsk. Hallama received in Novosibirsk information about the ousting of Chancellor of Justice Olavi Honka from candidate in presidential nomination.

According to the history of the Ministry of Foreign Affairs, quoted by historian Timo Soikkanen, Hallama would immediately have turned to the US Embassy in Helsinki to inform NATO in order to receive moral support to Finland. According to Soikkanen, Hallama secured the matter from the president and the government and thus took a huge risk for his career.

Most other historians, however, have considered Soikkanen's views of Hallama's action as unfounded and imaginative. Among other things, Ilkka Pastinen, who has acted as UN ambassador to Finland, said that, on the contrary, Hallama was extremely cautious.

At about 40 years of age, Hallama became ill with Parkinson's disease, which was attempted in 1963 to improve her condition at the Karolinska Hospital in Stockholm by surgery by the world-famous Swedish brain surgeon Herbert Olivecrona. However, the operation did not succeed, as a result of which Hallama lost his speech almost completely. Despite his illness, Urho Kekkonen relied on his Soviet knowledge so much that he named Hallama as an important ambassador to Moscow in 1967.

After four years as an ambassador in Copenhagen, Hallama returned to Moscow as Ambassador in 1974. When Mauno Koivisto became a new president in 1982, Hallama was called home from Moscow and moved from the Ministry for Foreign Affairs to retire in 1983 after working for more than 40 years.

Jaakko Hallama was married since 1947 with Anita Hallama (née. Weber) and had two sons. Anita Hallama became known for her long-term relationship with President Urho Kekkonen. According to Kauko Jämsén, who has been a secretary in Moscow under the auspices of Hamaam, Kekkonen has appointed an already seriously ill Jaakko Hallama Ambassador to Moscow in 1974, specifically from Anita Hallama's will, even though the Soviet people had been told that Hallama was a less desirable person because of his unclear speech.

Political offices
Preceded by Veli Merikoski	Foreign Minister of Finland; 1963–1964	Succeeded by Ahti Karjalainen
