= Arto Mansala =

Finnish diplomat

Arto Olavi Mansala (born 1941 Kuopio) is a Finnish diplomat, a Bachelor of Political Sciences. He has been an ambassador in Budapest between 1985 and 1989, in Beijing in 1989–1992, Moscow 1993-1996 and Bonn 1996–2001. After returning home he was Counselor of Foreign Affairs at the Political Department of the Ministry for Foreign Affairs 2001–2002, Under-Secretary of State 2002–2003, Deputy Secretary of State for the Summer of 2003 and Secretary of State from the beginning of September 2003. Mansala retired in 2008.
