= Pontus Artti =

Finnish diplomat, journalist and writer

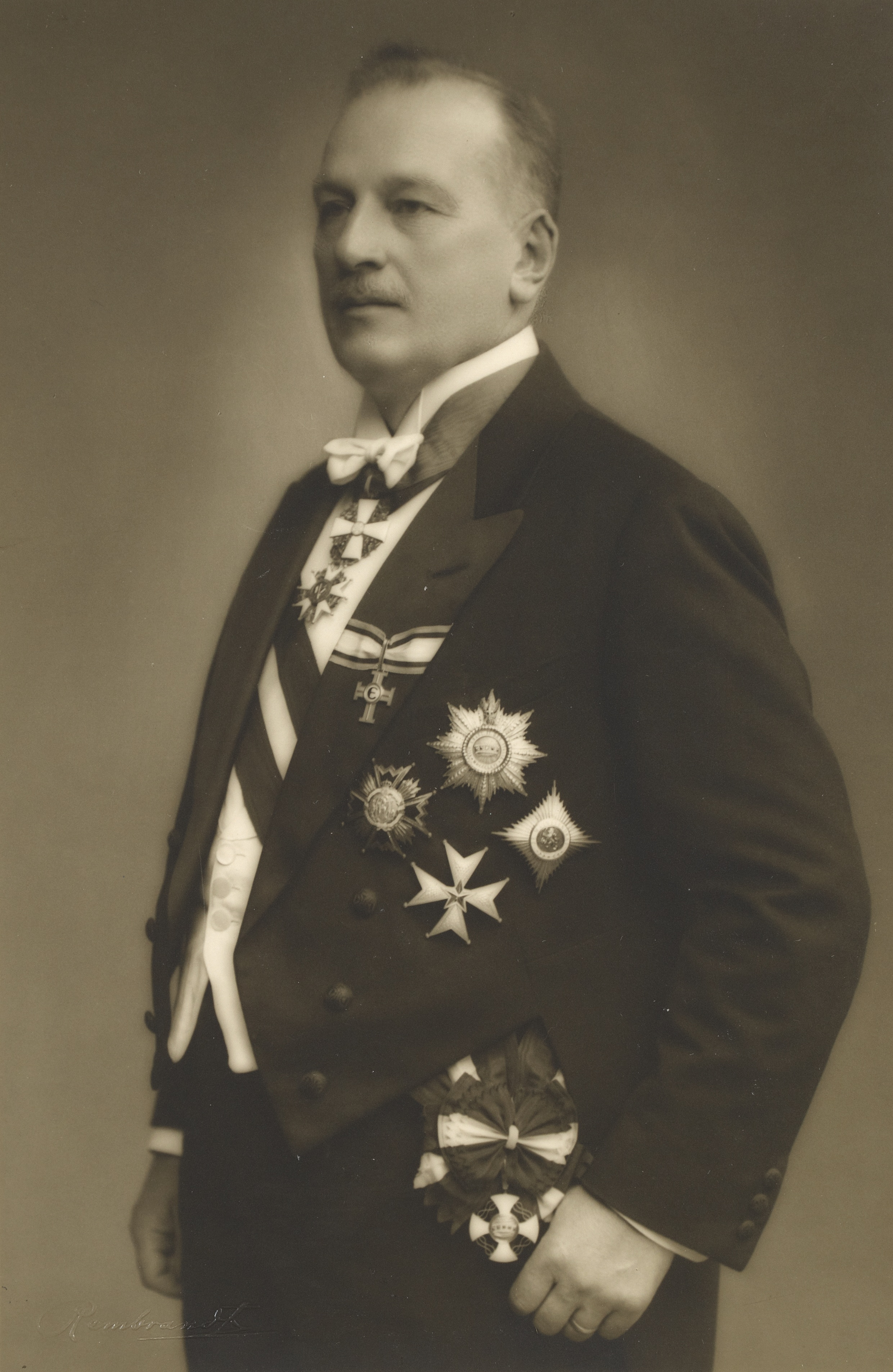
Pontus Artti in 1930s.

Pontus Kaarlo Artti (until 1896 Tegström; 1 January 1878, in Ylitornio – 30 July 1936, in Helsinki) was a Finnish diplomat, journalist and writer.

Artti was the son of the Lensmann Karl Gustaf Tegström and Mathilda Kajander. He graduated from Oulu Lyseo Upper Secondary School in 1896 and initially worked as a theater and journalist. Artti was the editor-in-chief of Turun Sanomat from 1910 until 1917.

Artti was Hankkija's Department Manager from 1918 to 1919 and then transferred to the Foreign Service in 1919. He served as Secretary of State for Foreign Affairs from 1921 to 1927. He was a Finnish Envoy to Moscow from 1927 until 1930 and to Rome from 1931 until 1936.

Pontus Artti was married to Eeva Hilda Amanda Wentinref in 1906.
