= Veli Merikoski =

Finnish politician (1905–1982)

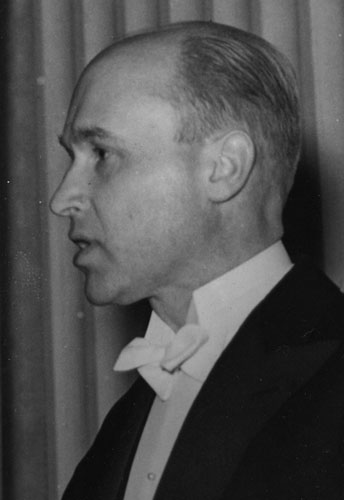

Minister of Foreign Affairs
- In office 13 April 1962 – 18 December 1963
- Prime Minister: Ahti Karjalainen
- Preceded by: Ahti Karjalainen
- Succeeded by: Jaakko Hallama

Personal details
- Born: Veli Kaarlo Merikoski; 2 January 1905 Pyhtää, Grand Duchy of Finland
- Died: 28 January 1982 (aged 77) Helsinki, Finland
- Party: People's
- Spouse: Wava Margit Winge (1940–)
- Education: University of Helsinki
- Occupation: Professor
- Profession: Law

Veli Kaarlo Merikoski (2 January 1905 in Pyhtää – 28 January 1982 in Helsinki) was a professor at the University of Helsinki and once the Minister for Foreign Affairs representing the People's Party.

Merikoski worked as an associate professor of administrative courts in the University of Helsinki 1937–1941. From 1941 to 1970 he was a professor. He was also a chancellor in the Turku School of Economics and a member in the Permanent Court of Arbitration in the Hague.

Kekkonen appointed Merikoski with the task to form a new government following the 1962 parliamentary elections. However, Merikoski was not successful in this task, and Ahti Karjalainen replaced him. Merikoski was the Minister of Foreign Affairs in the Ahti Karjalainen's cabinet on the mandate of the People's Party.

Political offices
Preceded by Ahti Karjalainen	Foreign Minister of Finland; 1962-1963	Succeeded by Jaakko Hallama
