= Jukka Mallinen =

Finnish translator, author and interpreter (born 1950)

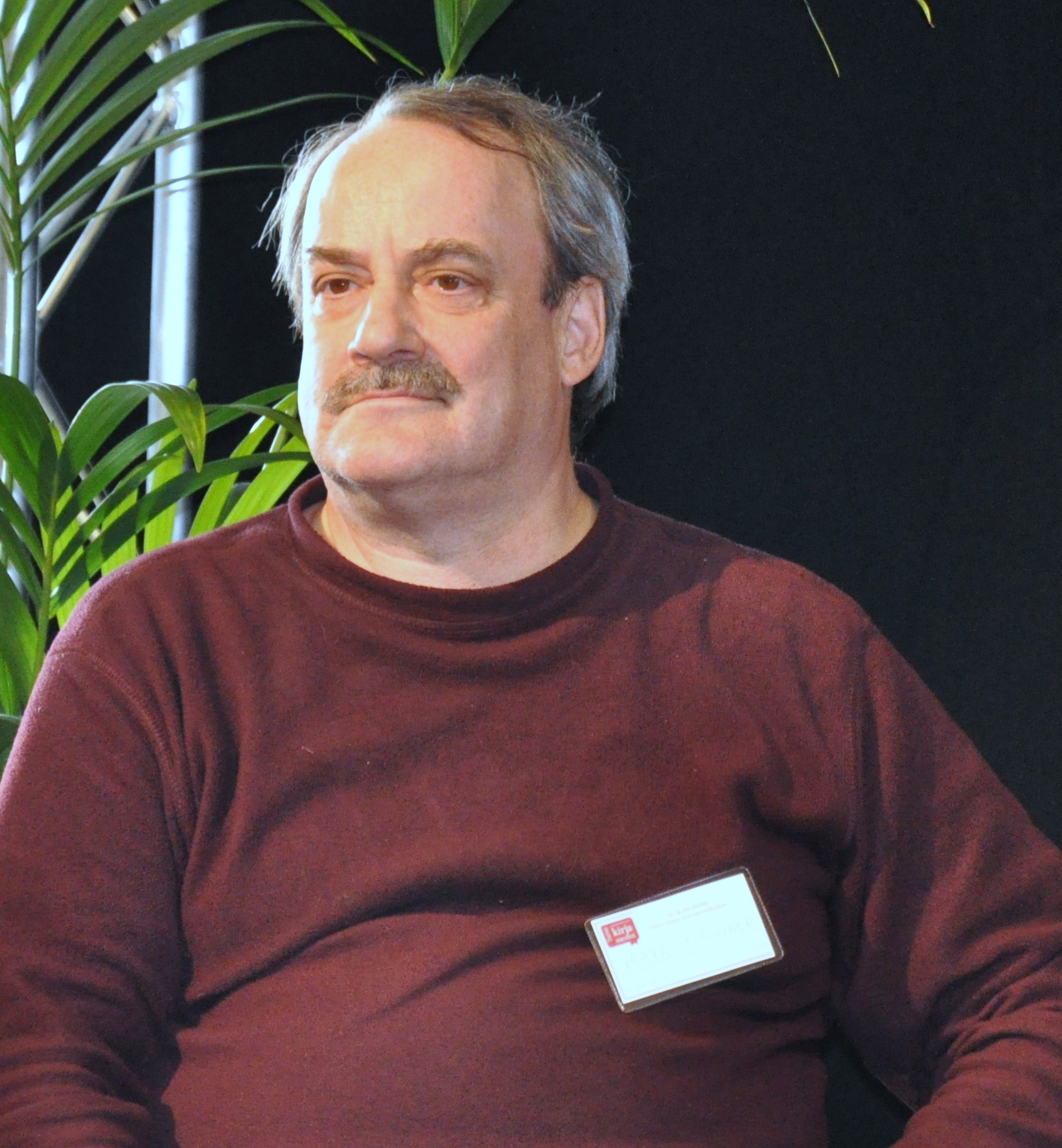
- Jukka Mallinen at the Turku Literature Fair, 2009.
- Born: 3 June 1950; Lahti, Finland
- Occupations: Poet, author, translator, interpreter

Jukka Mallinen (born 3 June 1950 Lahti) is a Finnish author, poet, translator and interpreter.

Mallinen studied literature at the Moscow State University during 1972–78. He wrote his master's thesis on Mikhail Bulgakov’s work The Master and Margarita. During 1979–1989 he worked for Finnish businesses involved in trade with the Soviet Union, e.g. for Kone. During 1993–1995 he was the head of The Finnish Institute in St. Petersburg. Since 1998 he has worked as an independent translator, translating Russian literature, both prose and poetry. During 2006–2009 he acted as the president of the Finnish branch of PEN International.

== Mallinen on Russia ==
Mallinen studied in the Philological Faculty of Moscow State University during 1972–1978. He says that during that time his eyes were opened, when he made acquaintances with the literary underworld. He went to Moscow as a communist, but he returned to Finland as an anticommunist. Even in those years, "the Philological Faculty was full of dissidents, and people there read widely forbidden literature. A sturdy East German Erika typewriter could handle four sheets of paper, with carbon paper between the sheets: One could borrow a popular work for a night, if one delivered four copies of it to the lender. One could keep one copy", Mallinen says. Even during his student days, Mallinen smuggled forbidden literature from the Soviet Union to Finland. Later, when he worked for Finnish businesses, he translated e. g. the poems of Eduard Limonov. He was somewhat scared at the time, since if he had been found out, he could have lost his visa, and then he would have had to look for other employment.

Mallinen has written on his views on Russia in his first book entitled Varastettua ilmaa (‘stolen air’, 2008). He is worried about the current state of affairs in Russia. He compares Vladimir Putin to Ivan the Terrible, and he sees parallels between Russia and Nazi Germany. The Russian regime wants to squash the civil rights. The regime represents "neo-barbarism", with a cult of power, hierarchical organization and the lack of rule of law. The nationalism promoted by the dominant culture wants to stifle multiculturalism, and it leads to stagnation and fossilization of culture. The Eastern Orthodox Church has allied itself with militarism and the current regime, and the nationalism is mixed with patriotism, racism and xenophobia.

According to Mallinen, racist views are the mainstream in Russia. He says that the Russian mainstream represents Huntingtonian cultural racism, which does not classify people according to their colour of skin, but according to their values. The Finnish critics of Islam, such as represented by Timo Vihavainen and Jussi Halla-aho, have imported their ideas from Russia.

According to Mallinen, in Russian history, Finno-Ugric peoples have been silenced.

Mallinen has quite a bleak view on Putin's Russia: the regime wants to recreate the Soviet regime:

Stalin is opium for the Russian people. The ecstasy on Stalin has hypnotized people there. It is sad, because when people close their eyes like, they keep Russia in a cul-de-sac and apart from the rest of the world.

Mallinen considers the Finland-Russia Society a stooge of the Kremlin, transformed as such by Heikki Talvitie and Paula Lehtomäki. In the magazine of the society, Venäjän Aika, Mallinen has been likened to Johan Bäckman, and the dialogue between the two has been labeled "quarrels of village idiots".

== Mallinen as the head of Finnish PEN ==
During 2006–2009 Mallinen served as the president of the Finnish PEN. He raised the profile of PEN by his active engagement in cultural discussion, and he commented e. g. on Russian affairs and on the Commonwealth of Independent States. For example, PEN was among the organizers of the candle protests outside the Russian Embassy in Finland in 2006, after the murder of Anna Politkovskaya.

During Mallinen's presidency, there were some controversies concerning Russia within the Finnish PEN. He was criticized by vice president Rita Dahl, and also the board of trustees were divided. Dahl said Mallinen was a publicity seeker, and she accused him of curbing free speech and of "neo-Finlandization.

Mallinen said he was being persecuted by the newspaper Tiedonantaja, that he was the spitting bowl of Putinists and that authoritarian and dictatorial elements were trying to infiltrate the Finnish PEN.

== Works ==
- Mallinen, Jukka; Salimon, Vladimir (1992). Sankarimatkailijan Moskova [‘The Moscow of the heroic traveller’]. Helsinki: Taifuuni. ISBN 951-581-006-X.
- Varastettua ilmaa. Vapaita esseitä Venäjästä [‘Stolen air. Free essays on Russia’]. Turku: Savukeidas. 2008. ISBN 978-952-5500-27-1.
- Ville Hytönen & Jukka Mallinen. Foreword: Jukka Mallinen, ed. (2008). Kun Putin ja Medvedev... Venäjän poliittiset vitsit [‘When Putin and Medvedev… Political jokes from Russia’]. Turku: Savukeidas. ISBN 978-952-5500-36-3.
- Sankarimatkailijan Kaliningrad [‘The Kaliningrad of the heroic traveler ’]. Rosebud. 2008. ISBN 978-952-01-0213-5.
- Seisahdus erämaassa. Elämäkertaa ja kirjoituksia Joseph Brodskysta [A stop in the wilderness. Biographical notes and other writings on Joseph Brodsky]. Turku: Savukeidas. 2010. ISBN 978-952-5500-73-8.
