= Aleksey Belyakov =

Soviet diplomat

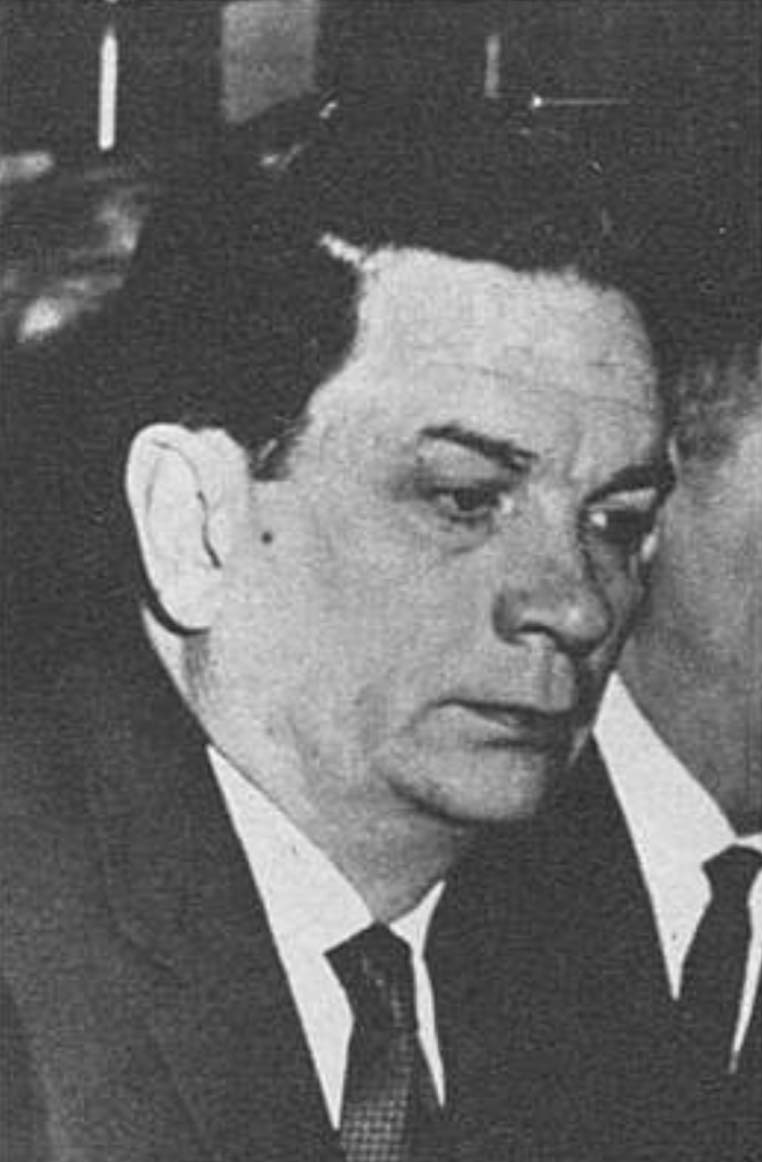
Aleksey Belyakov

Aleksei Stepanovich Belyakov (Russian: Алексей Степанович Беляков; 1907–1992) was a Soviet diplomat and ambassador to Finland 1970–71 and the leader of the European section of the Communist Party of the Soviet Union.

== Ambassadorship ==
In the summer of 1970, Belyakov was transferred as ambassador to Finland. His designation as ambassador was mainly because Moscow was interested in increasing the influence of the Finnish Communist Party in Finland. Belyakov mainly created relationships with the Finnish Communist Party's far left Stalinist wing and became its spiritual leader.

Belyakov's rival counselor Viktor Vladimirov estimated that in Finland there would be some kind of revolution and he supported it by sympathizing with the strikes and writing articles in Pravda about what he perceived as Finland's "class exploitation".

Another political idea of Belyakov was to encourage the Finnish Communist Party not to accept any Comprehensive Income Policy Agreements. President Urho Kekkonen invited the counselor Vladimirov to his official residence and reproached him about Belyakov. Vladimirov sent a telegram to Moscow and criticized Belyakov's actions in Finland. Kremlin responded to the telegram by sending the Deputy Foreign Minister Vasili Vasilyevich Kuznetsov to Finland. At a secret meeting, he convinced Kekkonen that the Soviet policy towards Finland hadn't changed and Finland had a right to solve its internal policy alone. After the visit Belyakov started to create contacts outside the Finnish Communist Party, especially with the centre-right National Coalition Party and industrialists and bankers.

Belyakov's countdown to leaving Finland started at President Kekkonen's dinner party in Kekkonen's official Tamminiemi residence where he was very drunk and behaved badly. Vladimirov sent a telegram to the Kremlin the following day, and suggested that Belyakov be sent back to Moscow. Belyakov left in February 1971 for Moscow, never to visit Finland again.

He died in 1992.
