= Yevgeny Adamov =

Russian nuclear engineer and politician (born 1939)

- Евгений Адамов
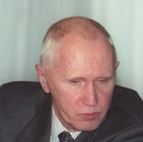
- Adamov in 2000

Adviser to the Prime Minister of Russia
- In office 2002–2004
- Prime Minister: Mikhail Kasyanov; Viktor Khristenko (acting); Mikhail Fradkov

Member of the Security Council of Russia
- In office 18 November 1998 – 27 May 2000
- President: Boris Yeltsin; Vladimir Putin

Minister for Atomic Energy of Russia
- In office 4 March 1998 – 28 March 2001
- Prime Minister: Viktor Chernomyrdin; Sergey Kiriyenko; Yevgeny Primakov; Sergei Stepashin; Vladimir Putin; Mikhail Kasyanov
- Preceded by: Viktor Mikhaylov
- Succeeded by: Alexander Rumyantsev

Personal details
- Born: 28 April 1939 (age 87) Moscow, Russian SFSR, Soviet Union
- Party: Communist Party of the Soviet Union (until 1991)
- Education: Moscow Aviation Institute
- Awards: Order of the Badge of Honour (1982); State Prize of the Russian Federation (2024)

Yevgeny Olegovich Adamov (Russian: Евге́ний Оле́гович Ада́мов, born 28 April 1939) is a Soviet and Russian nuclear engineer and politician. He was the director of the N. A. Dollezhal Research and Development Institute of Power Engineering (NIKIET) from 1986 to 1998. He served as the Minister for Atomic Energy of Russia from 1998 to 2001, member of the Security Council of Russia from 1998 to 2000, and adviser to the Prime Minister of Russia from 2002 to 2004.

In 2008 he was sentenced to five and a half years in prison for abuse of office and fraud, which was reduced to four years of probation on appeal.

== Biography ==
Yevgeny Adamov was born on 28 April 1939 in Moscow. After graduating in 1962 from the Moscow Aviation Institute with a major in mechanical engineering, he joined the I. V. Kurchatov Institute of Atomic Energy and worked there until 1986. From 1986 to 1998 Adamov directed NIKIET, a Russian state nuclear research and design institute.

In 2005 he was arrested in Bern, Switzerland, on fraud charges. The arrest was made at the request of the United States. The United States accused Adamov of diverting up to US$9 million which the United States Department of Energy gave Russia to help improve security at its nuclear facilities. Extradition requests were filed first by the United States and then by Russia, which has protested about the move by the United States. Adamov was finally extradited to Russia. The move was widely covered as a successful ploy by the Russian government to prevent Adamov from telling US authorities state secrets that he knew.

In 2008 Adamov was convicted in Russia of abuse of office and defrauding the Russian government of some $31 million in US aid funds intended for security upgrades for aging nuclear reactors.

On 20 February 2008 he was convicted of fraud and misuse of power by the Zamoskvoretsky District Court of Moscow and sentenced to 5.5 years of imprisonment.

He was released from jail when his sentence was suspended by a higher-level court on 17 April 2008.

== Awards and decorations ==
- Order of the Badge of Honour (1982)
- Honoured Worker of Science and Technology of the Russian Federation (11 October 1995)
- Medal "In Commemoration of the 850th Anniversary of Moscow"
- Order of Tomsk Glory (6 May 2022)
- State Prize of the Russian Federation in science and technology for 2023 (10 June 2024)
