= René Nyberg =

Finnish diplomat (born 1946)

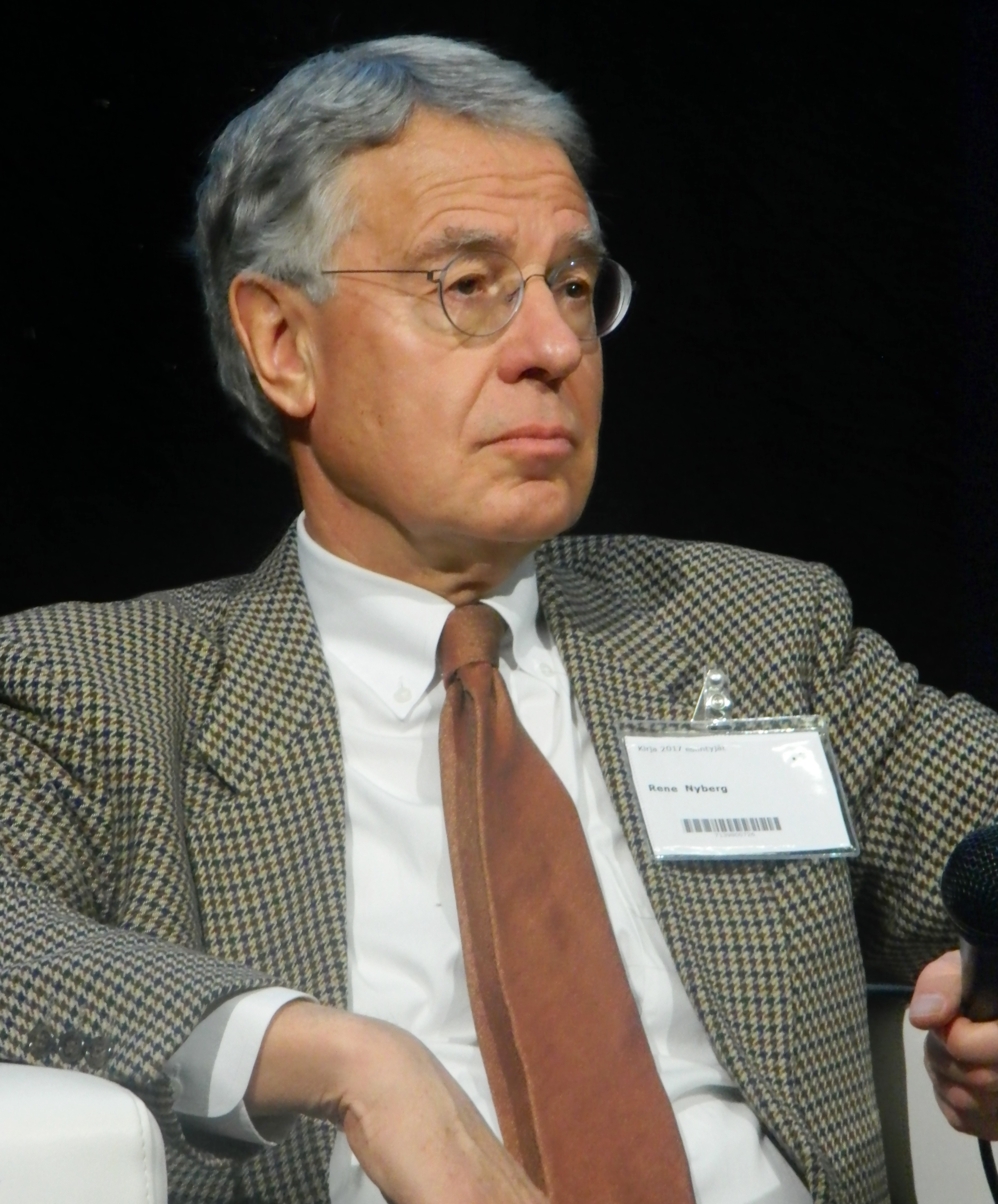
René Nyberg

Ernst René Anselm Nyberg (born 13 February 1946, in Helsinki) is a long-time Finnish diplomat and a former CEO of the East Office consultancy company. He retired in 2013.

Nyberg graduated from a German school of Helsinki in 1965 and a bachelor of political science from the University of Helsinki in 1969. In 1971, he joined the Ministry for Foreign Affairs of Finland and took up various duties in Moscow, Leningrad, Brussels, Bonn and Permanent Representatives of Finland to the OSCE in Vienna between 1992 and 1995. In 2000, he was appointed Ambassador to Moscow and in 2004 he became Ambassador to Berlin. Nyberg started as the Managing Director of East Office in 2008. Since 2016, he serves as a director/trustee of the School of Civic Education in London, which forms part of an association of schools of political studies, under the auspices of the Directorate General of Democracy (“DGII”) of the Council of Europe.

Nyberg's spouse is Professor Kaisa Nyberg. His cousin, Hillel Tokazier, is a pianist. In the book The Last Train to Moscow, Nyberg tells about the steps of the Jewish mother's Fanny's family's life and portrays Eastern European Judaism.
