= Pavel Kuznetsov (diplomat) =

Russian diplomat

- Павел Кузнецов
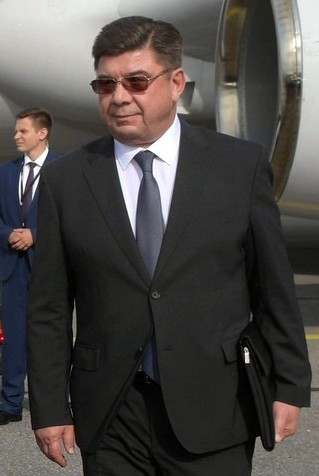
- Kuznetsov in 2019

Ambassador of Russia to Finland
- Incumbent
- Assumed office 14 August 2017
- Preceded by: Alexander Rumyantsev

Ambassador of Russia to Slovakia
- In office 20 April 2010 – 10 September 2014
- Preceded by: Aleksandr Udaltsov
- Succeeded by: Aleksey Fedotov

Personal details
- Born: Pavel Maratovich Kuznetsov; 10 August 1958 Moscow, Soviet Union
- Education: Moscow State Institute of International Relations
- Awards: Order of Friendship

Pavel Maratovich Kuznetsov (Russian: Павел Маратович Кузнецов; born 10 August 1958) is a Russian diplomat who has served as the Ambassador of Russia to Finland since 14 August 2017.

Kuznetsov had been the ambassador to Slovakia from 2010 to 2014.

== Biography ==
Kuznetsov was born in Moscow on 10 August 1958. In 1980, he graduated from the Moscow State Institute of International Relations of the USSR Ministry of Foreign Affairs and entered the diplomatic work in the USSR Ministry of Foreign Affairs.

From 1980 to 1985, Kuznetsov worked as an employee of the Soviet Embassy in Finland. From 1991 to 1996 he was on a business trip for the second time as an employee of the Russian Embassy in Finland. From 1997 to 1999, he was deputy director of the Second European Department of the Russian Foreign Ministry. From 1999 to 2004 he was minister counselor of the Russian Embassy in Estonia. From 2004 to 2006, he worked as deputy director of the foreign policy planning department of the Russian Foreign Ministry, and from July 2006 to 2010, he became the director of the Second European Department of the Russian Foreign Ministry.

From 20 April 2010, to 10 September 2014, Kuznetsov was Ambassador of Russia to Slovakia. From 2014 to 2017, he was director of the General Secretariat (Department) of the Russian Foreign Ministry.

On 14 August 2017, Kuznestov became the ambassador to Finland.

== Family ==
Pavel Kuznestov's father, Marat Nikolayevich (born 25 June 1926 in Moscow), had been a diplomat and former army officer.

From December 1944 to May 1945 he served as an ordinary signalman-telephonist of the signal platoon of the second battalion of the 381st rifle regiment of the 61st separate rifle division of the internal troops of the NKVD as part of the 2nd Ukrainian Front. He took part in the Battle of Debrecen during the Budapest offensive. From 1946 to 1950 he served in the border troops: he graduated from the sergeant's school in the city of Vylok, Transcarpathian region of the Ukrainian SSR, served at the 5th border outpost of the 14th border detachment of the Transcarpathian border district. He took part in the elimination of Bandera formations.

After graduating from Moscow State Institute of International Relations, Marat engaged in the diplomatic work from 1957. He graduated from the Higher Diplomatic School of the USSR Ministry of Foreign Affairs. He was awarded the Order of the Red Banner of Labour, the Order of the Patriotic War II degree, the Order of Friendship of Peoples, the Order of the Badge of Honour, the Czechoslovak Order of the White Lion II degree, domestic and foreign (Czechoslovakia, Bulgaria) medals. Kuznetsov was warded with a Certificate of Honor from the Presidium of the Supreme Soviet of the RSFSR.

Pavel was married and has a son.

== Awards ==
On 5 April 2017, Kuznestov was awarded the Order of Friendship.
