= Matti Anttonen =

Finnish diplomat (born 1957)

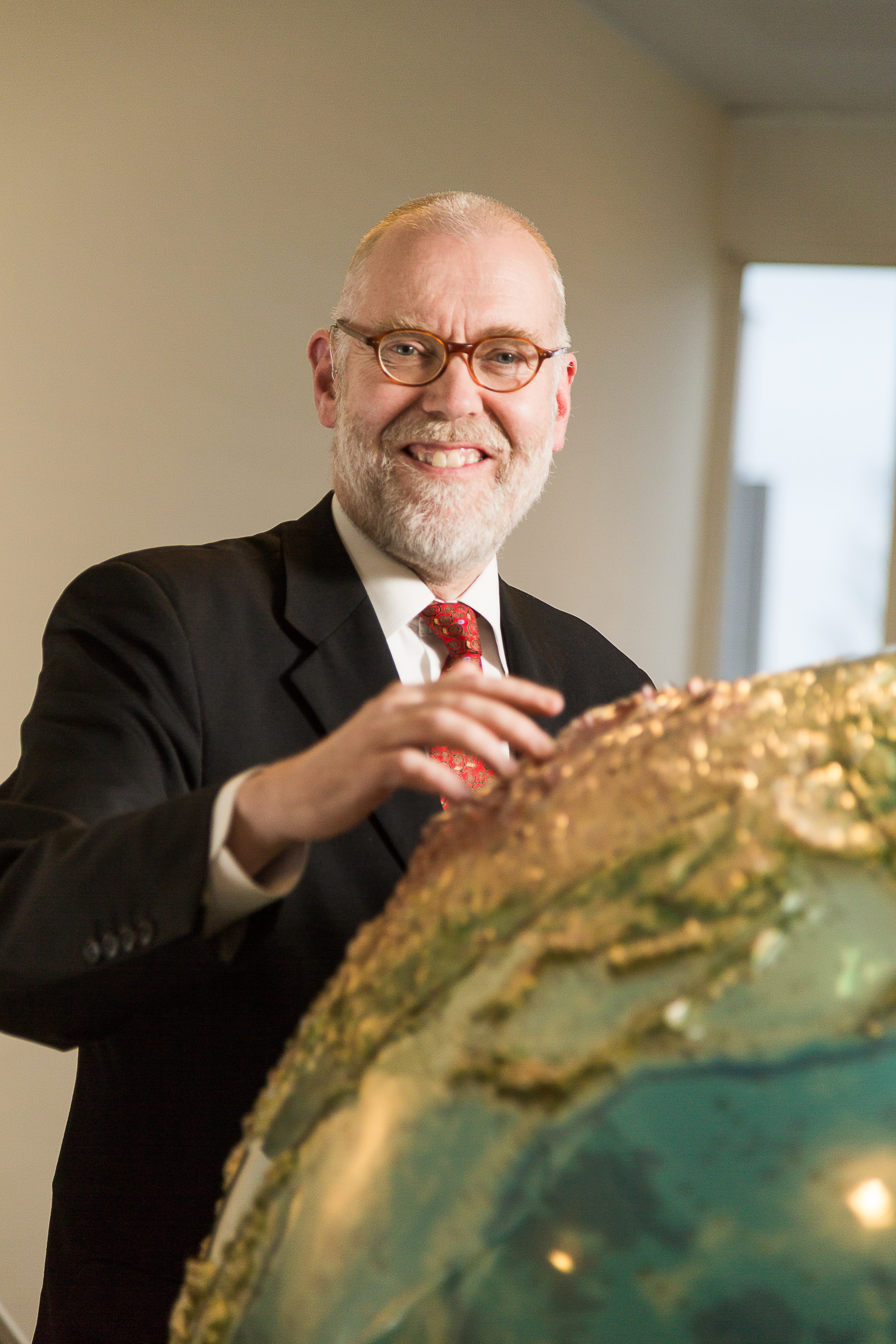
Matti Anttonen in 2015

Matti Kalervo Anttonen (born 27 November 1957) is a Finnish diplomat and the present Secretary of State for the Ministry of Foreign Affairs of Finland since 1 March 2018.

== Early life and education ==
Anttonen was born in Tampere and graduated from the Turku School of Economics, obtaining a master's degree from the University of Turku.

== Career ==
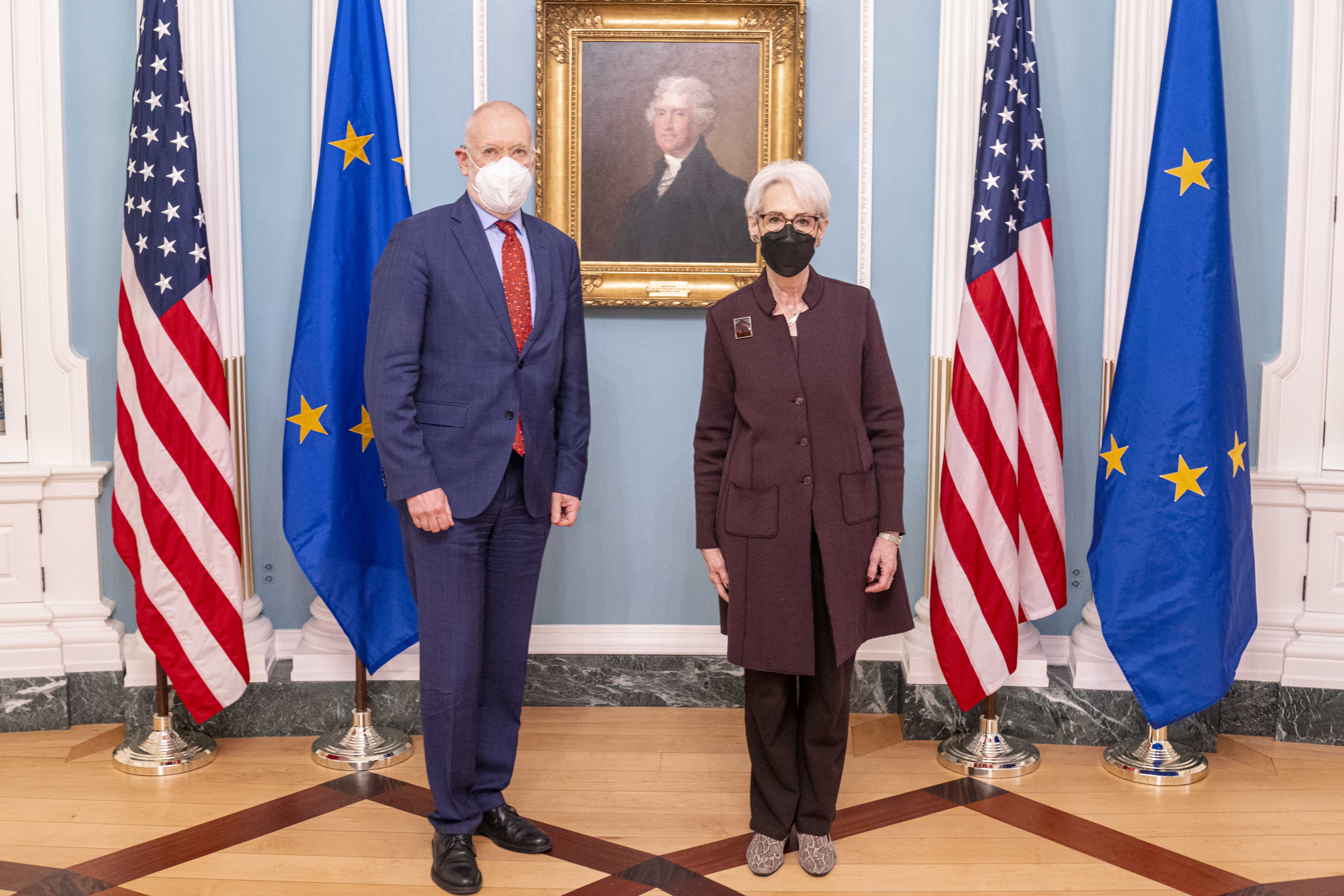
Anttonen with US Deputy Secretary of State Wendy Sherman in 2021

Anttonen joined the Ministry for Foreign Affairs in 1986. Between 1987 and 1991, he served as Assistant Secretary and Secretary of the Moscow Embassy, then three years at the Geneva Permanent Representation in the UN and between 1994 and 1996 he was responsible for the EU-Russia relations at the Ministry of Foreign Affairs.

In 1998, Anttonen was appointed Head of the Russian Unit and in 2001 the deputy director of the East Department of the Ministry of Foreign Affairs.

Between 2002 and 2006, he served as the Minister and Deputy Head of Mission at the Embassy in Washington, and then as the Energy Coordinator in Helsinki 2007–2008, until he was appointed Ambassador to Moscow.

Anttonen was the Finnish Ambassador to Sweden from January 2017 until February 2018 as well was Finland's ambassador to Russia from 2008 until the end of April 2012.

In November 2018, Anttonen summoned Russia's Ambassador to Finland Pavel Kuznetsov over the large-scale disruption of Finland's Global Positioning System (GPS) signal during NATO’s largest exercise in decades.

After the Russian Ambassadorship, Anttonen served as the Under-Secretary of State for External Economic Relations.

== Other activities ==
- Finnish Institute of International Affairs (FIIA), Member of the Advisory Council (since 2019)
