= Boris Aristov =

Soviet politician and diplomat

Boris Ivanovich Aristov (Борис Иванович Аристов; 13 September 1925 – 27 November 2018) was a Soviet politician and diplomat who served as Soviet Ambassador to Finland (1988–1992) and Poland (1978–1983), Soviet Minister of Foreign Trade (1985–1988).
