= Embassy of Iraq, Helsinki =

Coordinates: 60.1834°N 25.0140°E

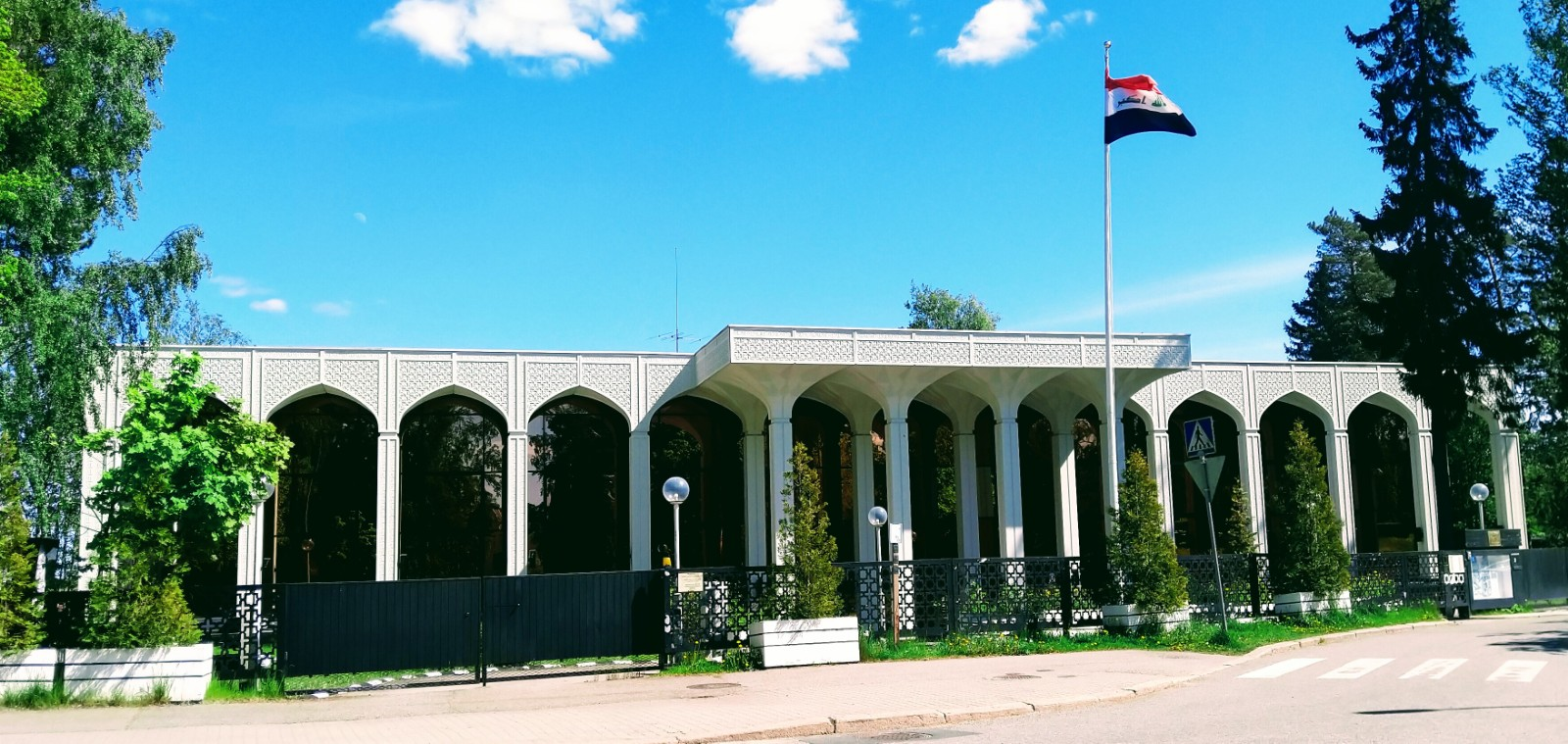
The front of the embassy photographed in 2020

Embassy of Iraq in Helsinki is located in the district of Kulosaari and sticks out due to its Middle-Eastern architecture. At first this was met with scepticism and resentment from the locals since the building was so different from the rest of the building in Kulosaari. However, due to the diplomatic immunity, the state of Iraq was free to design its own embassy however it wanted.

The property has 2,800 m^{2} of space. It was the first embassy building built by the Saddam Hussein regime in Western Europe starting the construction work in 1979 and finishing next year. The first ambassador was general Salih Mahdi Ammash who was known locally as the "Caliph of Kulosaari" due to his boisterous behaviour.

The Embassy was designed by DLA (Dinkha Latchin Associates), founded by Dinkha Latchin, an Iraqi born British architect. The design was pushed to reflect traditional Iraqi art and architecture.

During the Gulf War the embassy was emptied and it wasn't in use for years falling into disrepair. In 2007 Iraq decided to repair the building entirely.
