= Vladimir Grinin =

Russian diplomat

- Владимир Гринин
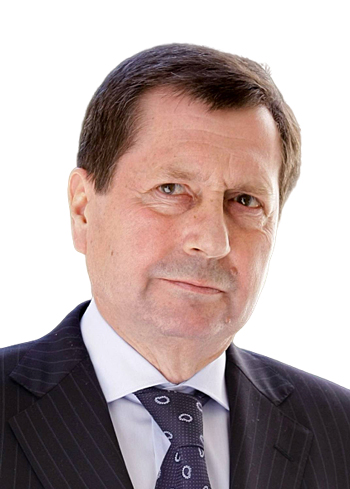

Ambassador of Russia to Germany
- In office 3 July 2010 – 10 January 2018
- Preceded by: Vladimir Kontonyov
- Succeeded by: Sergey Nechayev

Ambassador of Russia to Poland
- In office 21 April 2006 – 21 June 2010
- Preceded by: Nikolay Afanasevsky
- Succeeded by: Aleksandr Alekseyev

Ambassador of Russia to Finland
- In office 21 April 2003 – 21 April 2006
- Preceded by: Aleksandr Patsev
- Succeeded by: Aleksandr Rumyanstev

Ambassador of Russia to Austria
- In office 30 August 1996 – 28 April 2000
- Preceded by: Valery Popov
- Succeeded by: Aleksandr Golovin

Personal details
- Born: 15 November 1947 (age 78) Moscow, Soviet Union
- Education: Moscow State Institute of International Relations; Diplomatic Academy of the Ministry of Foreign Affairs of the USSR

Vladimir Mikhailovich Grinin (Russian: Владимир Михайлович Гринин; born 15 November 1947) is a Russian former diplomat who served as the Russian ambassador to Austria, Finland, Poland, and Germany.

== Biography ==
Vladimir Mikhailovich Grinin was born on 15 November 1947 in Moscow, Soviet Union. Grinin graduated from the Moscow State Institute of International Relations in 1971 and commenced diplomatic work, serving at the Soviet Embassy in West Germany from 1973 to 1980. After his posting to West Germany, he returned to Moscow and attended the Diplomatic Academy of the Ministry of Foreign Affairs of the USSR. Grinin graduated in 1982 and participated in Soviet-American negotiations on disarmament and arms control in Geneva until 1986. He was then posted to the Soviet Embassy in East Germany from 1986 and then in Germany from 1990 to 1992.

From 1994 to 1996, Grinin was director of the Fourth European Department at the Russian Ministry of Foreign Affairs. He was appointed by President Boris Yeltsin as Ambassador of Russia to Austria in 1996, and held the post in Vienna until 2000. After this posting he returned to Moscow, and was appointed by President Vladimir Putin as Ambassador of Russia to Finland in 2003, and held this post until 2006, when he was appointed as Ambassador of Russia to Poland. Grinin served as Ambassador of Russia to Germany in Berlin from 2010 until reaching the age limit for Russian ambassadors and was replaced by Sergey Nechaev on 10 January 2018.

Grinin is married with one daughter, and speaks Russian, English, German and French.
