= Finland–Russia Society =

Finland–Russia Society (Finnish)

The Finland–Russia Society (Finnish: Suomi-Venäjä-Seura), formerly called the Finland – Soviet Union Society (Finnish: Suomi-Neuvostoliitto-Seura), is a Finnish registered association that promotes friendly relations between Finland and Russia (formerly the Soviet Union). In 2014, it had circa 12,500 members. Since 2020, it has been chaired by Member of the Parliament Petri Honkonen.

== History ==
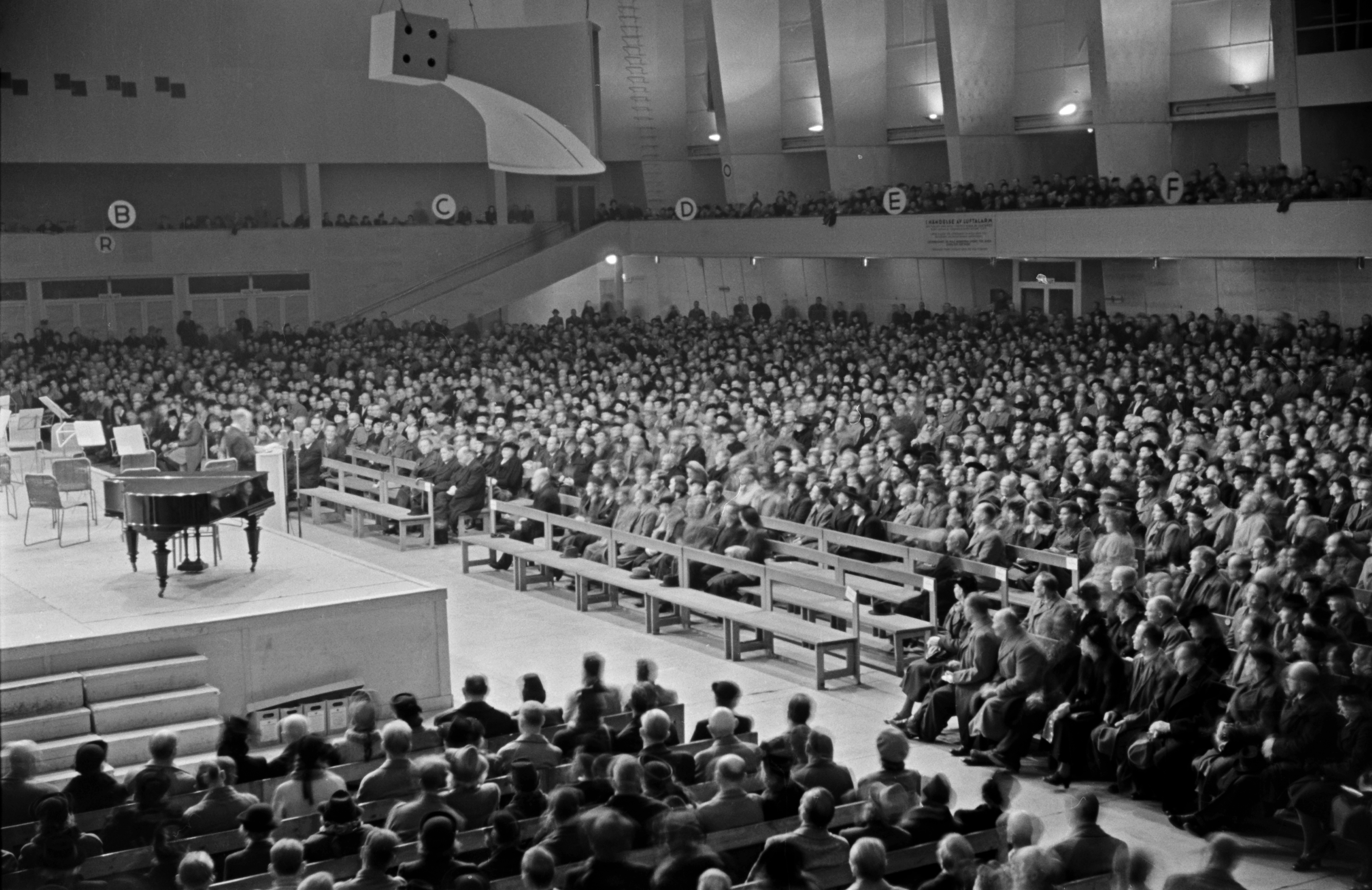
The founding party of the Finland-USSR Society in Messuhalli, 1944

The Finland-Soviet Union Society was founded on 15 October 1944, less than a month after the Moscow Armistice that had ended the Continuation War between Finland and the USSR. Attendees of the Society's founding meeting included future Presidents Urho Kekkonen and J. K. Paasikivi and playwright Hella Wuolijoki. The Society promoted signing of the Finno-Soviet Treaty of 1948.

== Goals and activities ==
The Finland–Russia Society tries to create partnerships and dialogue between Finns and Russians and promote knowledge of Russia and Finno-Ugric peoples. Its activities include supplying Russian visas to Finns and organizing many kinds of cultural events.
