= Alexander Rumyantsev (minister) =

Russian scientist, academician, minister and ambassador

- Александр Румянцев
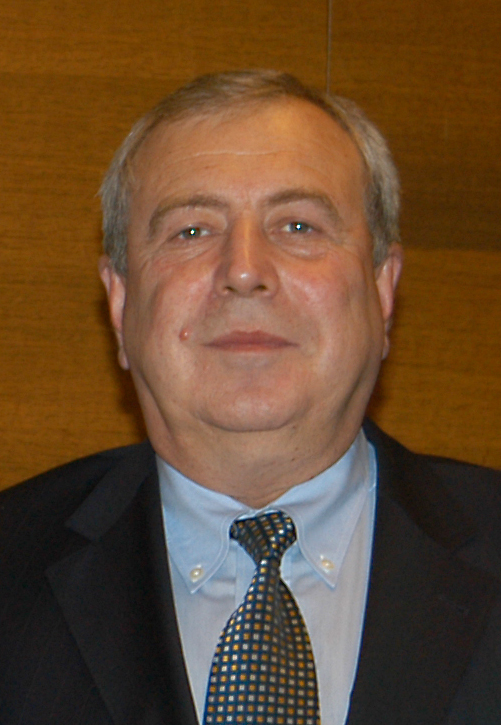
- Rumyantsev in 2002

Ambassador of Russia to Finland
- In office 21 April 2006 – 14 August 2017
- Preceded by: Vladimir Grinin
- Succeeded by: Pavel Kuznetsov

Director General of the State Atomic Energy Corporation Rosatom
- In office March 2004 – 15 November 2005
- Succeeded by: Sergei Kiriyenko

Minister for Atomic Energy
- In office 28 March 2001 – 24 February 2004
- Preceded by: Yevgeny Adamov
- Succeeded by: position abolished

Personal details
- Born: Pavel Maratovich Kuznetsov; 10 August 1958 Moscow, Soviet Union

Alexander Yuryevich Rumyantsev (Russian: Александр Юрьевич Румянцев; born July 26, 1945) is a Russian scientist, academician, minister, and ambassador.

== Career ==
Since graduating MEPhI 1969, worked in Kurchatov Institute researching nuclear physics. In 1994, he was appointed as the director of the Kurchatov Institute. In 1996 he was elected as the corresponding member of the Russian Academy of Sciences, and since 2000 is the academician.

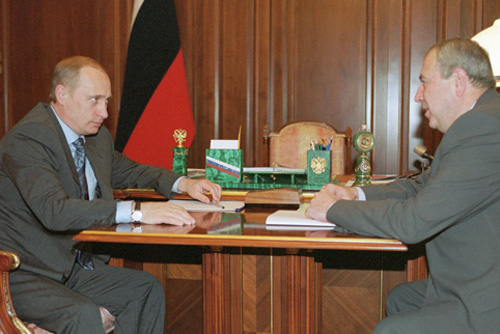
Alexander Rumjantsev with president Putinin in 2001

In 2001 he was appointed as the Minister of the Atomic Energy of the Russian Federation, in the cabinet of the Prime Minister Mikhail Kasyanov. During his tenure the Megatons to Megawatts agreement was renegotiated in 2002. Following the dismissal of the whole cabinet in February 2004 by President Putin, the Ministry was reorganized into a Federal Agency on Atomic Energy where Alexander Rumyantsev was appointed as the CEO. He stepped down from this post in November 2005 during the international scandal involving his predecessor as a Minister, Yevgeny Adamov.

In preparation for his next job Alexander Rumyantsev graduated the Higher Diplomatic Courses of the Diplomatic Academy of the Russian MFA in 2006, and was posted as the Russian ambassador to the Republic of Finland. Later he was awarded the diplomatic rank of the Ambassador Extraordinary and Plenipotentiary of the Russian Federation in April 2008.

== Awards and decorations ==
- 1986 - USSR State Prize for the cycle of works on "new methods of research in the field of solid-state physics based on scattering the neutrons in stationary nuclear reactors".
- 2001 - Order of Honour
- 2005 - Order of Merit for the Fatherland IV class
- 2010 - Order of Friendship
- 2017 - Grand Cross of the Order of the Lion of Finland
