= Hannu Himanen =

Finnish diplomat (born 1951)

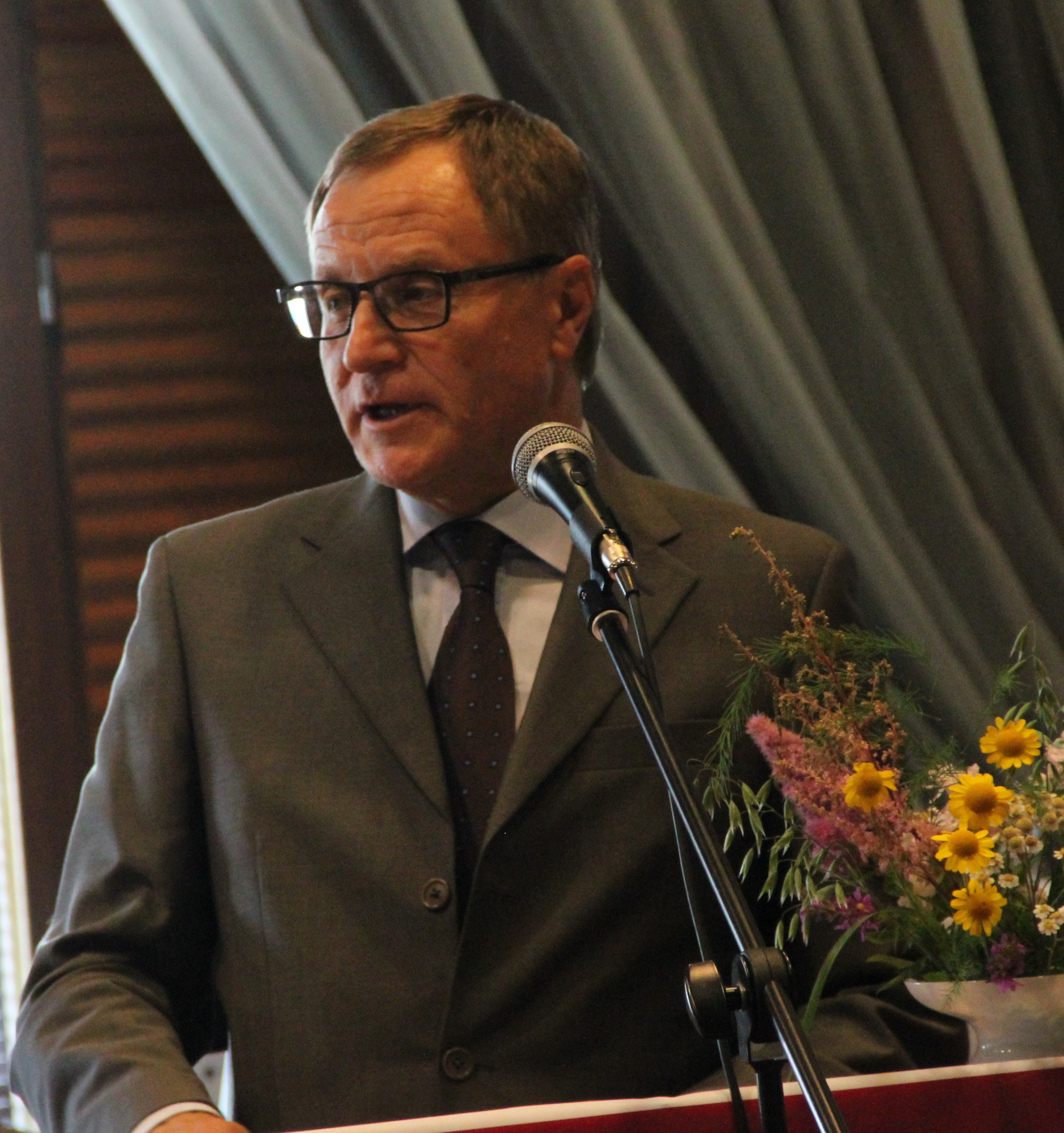
Hannu Himanen

Hannu Himanen (born 1951) is a Finnish diplomat. He was the Finnish Ambassador to Russia in Moscow from 1 May 2012 to August 2016 and retired shortly after the post to Moscow.

== Biography ==
Himanen acted as the Finnish Ambassador and Permanent Representative to the United Nations and other international organizations and to the World Trade Organization in the WTO in Geneva, from 2008 to 2012.

Himanen graduated in 1976 with a Bachelor of Social Sciences from the University of Tampere with a major degree in Information Science. He started with the Ministry for Foreign Affairs 1976. Between 1996 and 2000, he was the Ambassador of Finland in Jakarta. Between 2000 and 2001, he was Director General for Africa and the Middle East at the Ministry for Foreign Affairs, from 2001 to 2002 at the EastWest Institute for Security and Good Governance at the Prague Center, and from 2002 to 2003 as Foreign Affairs Counselor at the Ministry for Foreign Affairs Research and Planning.

In 2003–2008, Himanen was under-secretary to the State Department.
