= Ministry for Foreign Affairs (Finland) =

Government ministry of Finland

- Ulkoministeriö (in Finnish); Utrikesministeriet (in Swedish)

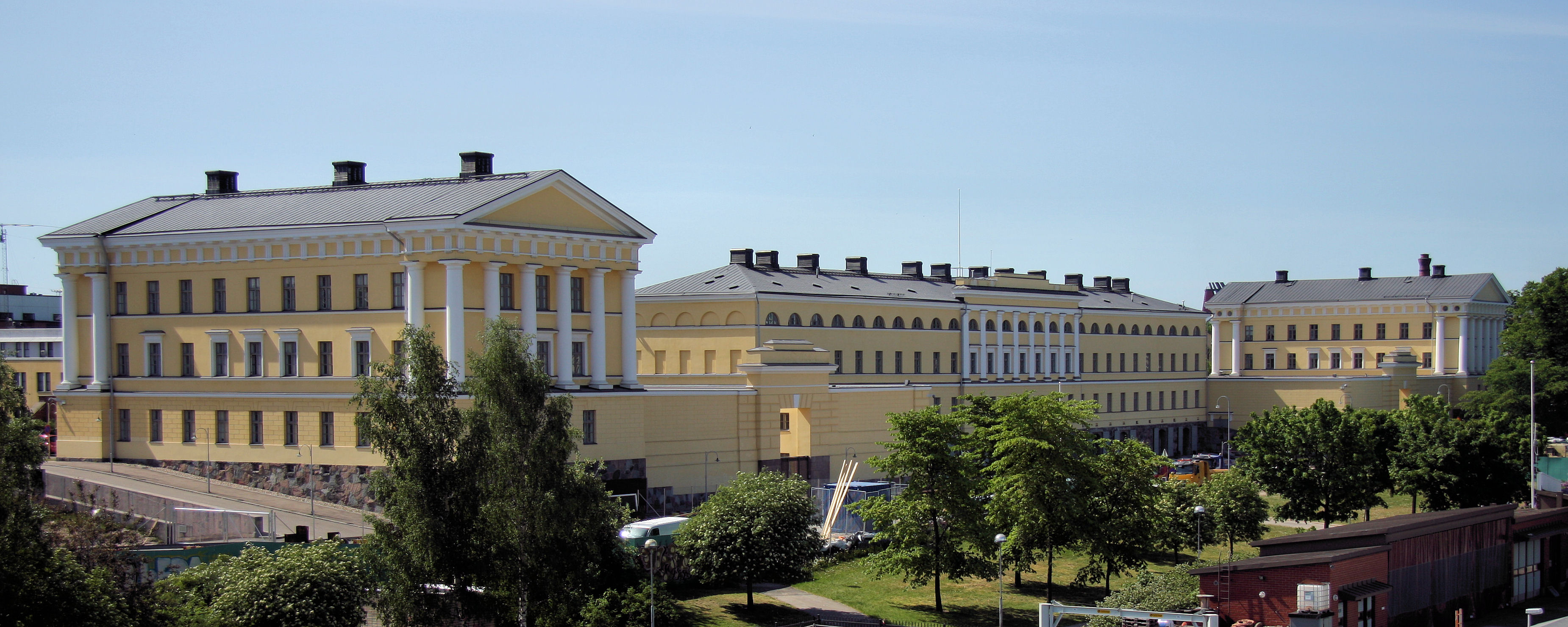

Ministry overview
- Formed: 28 June 1918; 108 years ago
- Jurisdiction: Finnish Government
- Headquarters: Merikasarmi, Laivastokatu 22, Katajanokka, 00160 Helsinki
- Employees: 1,420 permanent employees 980 local employees
- Annual budget: €1.079 billion (2017)
- Ministers responsible: Elina Valtonen, Minister for Foreign Affairs; Ville Tavio, Minister for Foreign Trade and Development
- Ministry executive: Jukka Salovaara, Permanent State Secretary
- Website: um.fi

The Ministry for Foreign Affairs (MFA) is a ministry in the Finnish Government and is responsible for preparing and implementing the government's foreign policy.

== Organisation ==
The ministry in 2017 has a total budget of 1.079 billion euros, of which 675 million will be spent on development cooperation and 248 million euros on the ministry's operating expenses. Upkeep of crisis management troops will cost 50 million euros and civilian personnel 15 million.

It employs 1,420 people (of whom approximately 74% are women) as well as 980 locally hired personnel and maintains 89 overseas offices housing foreign missions. Since 1987 the ministry has been concentrated in the Katajanokka district of Helsinki.

Two ministers in the current Petteri Orpo's government have portfolios relating to the ministry:

- Minister for Foreign Affairs, who is in overall political control of the ministry
- Minister for Foreign Trade and Development

The most senior civil servant is the Secretary of State, and is assisted by four Under-Secretaries of State with responsibilities allocated as follows:

- Administrative, Legal and Protocol Affairs
- Foreign and Security Policy, Communications and Culture
- External Economic Affairs
- International Development Cooperation and Development Policy

Below these, the ministry is divided into twelve departments:

- Political Department
- Department for External Economic Relations
- Department for Development Policy
- Department for Europe
- Department for Russia, Eastern Europe and Central Asia;
- Department for the Americas and Asia;
- Department for Africa and the Middle East.
- Department for Global Affairs
- Legal Department
- Department for Administrative Affairs
- Department for Communication and Culture
- Protocol Department

Outside of these departments there are two specialised units:

- Unit for Internal Auditing
- Unit for Policy Planning and Research

== Current Ministers ==
The ministers, as of 20 June 2023, are:

- Minister for Foreign and European Affairs – Elina Valtonen
- Minister for Foreign Trade and Development – Ville Tavio

The current Secretary of State at the Ministry for Foreign Affairs is Matti Anttonen.

== Official Development Assistance ==
According to the OECD, Finland's total official development assistance (ODA) (USD 1.6 billion) increased in 2022 due to in-donor refugee costs. It represented 0.58% of gross national income (GNI). Finland's development co-operation prioritises the rights and status of women and girls; sustainable economies and decent work; quality education; peace and democracy; and climate change and the sustainable use of natural resources.

== See also ==
- Foreign relations of Finland
- Minister for Foreign Affairs (Finland)
- State visit to Finland
