= List of ambassadors of Finland =

This is a list of current and former ambassadors from Finland. Note that some ambassadors are responsible for more than one country while others are directly accredited from Helsinki or other capital cities.

== Africa ==
=== Abuja (Nigeria) ===
Representative	Years	Status
Jaakko Lyytinen (Lagos)	1963–1966	Ambassador
Olavi Saikku (Lagos)	1966–1969	Ambassador
Olli Auero (Lagos)	1969–1971	Ambassador
Ensio Helaniemi (Lagos)	1971–1973	Ambassador
Erkki Hedmanson (Lagos)	1973–1976	Ambassador
Aarno Arola (Lagos)	1976–1981	Ambassador
Bo Ådahl (Lagos)	1981–1985	Ambassador
Vilho Koiranen (Lagos)	1985–1989	Ambassador
Esko Kunnamo (Lagos)	1989–1992	Ambassador
Heikki Latvanen (Lagos)	1992–1995	Ambassador
Hannu Ripatti (Lagos)	1996–1998	Chargé d'Affaires
Eero Saarikoski (Lagos)	1999–2003	Ambassador
Anna-Liisa Korhonen (Lagos/Abuja)	2003–2007	Ambassador
Erik Ulfstedt (Abuja)	2007–2008	Ambassador
Anneli Vuorinen (Abuja)	2008–2011	Ambassador
Riitta Korpivaara (Abuja)	2011–2014	Ambassador
Pirjo Suomela-Chowdhury (Abuja)	2014–2018	Ambassador
Jyrki Pulkkinen (Abuja)	2018-Incumbent	Ambassador

=== Addis Abeba (Ethiopia) ===
Representative	Years	Status
Atle Asanti (Cairo	1959–1962	Envoy
Osmo Orkomies (Cairo	1962–1965	Envoy
Henrik Blomstedt	1965–1969	Ambassador
Joel Pekuri	1969–1971	Ambassador
Veikko Hietanen	1972–1977	Ambassador
Unto Tanskanen (Nairobi)	1977–1980	Ambassador
Sakari Juuti	1977–1979	Chargé d'affaires
Raimo Salmi (Nairobi)	1981–1983	Ambassador
Hannu Uusi-Videnoja	1980–1983	Chargé d'affaires
Tom Grönberg (Nairobi)	1983–1987	Ambassador
Esko Jääsalo	1984–1987	Chargé d'affaires
Erik Brehmer (Nairobi)	1987–1990	Ambassador
Ilkka Ristimäki	1987–1991	Chargé d'affaires
David Johansson (Nairobi)	1990–1995	Ambassador
Arvi Siirala	1990–1995	Chargé d'affaires
Kaija Kahilainen	1991–1992	Chargé d'affaires
Glenn Lindholm (Nairobi)	1995–1998	Ambassador
Lauri Kangas	1994–1997	Chargé d'affaires
Heli Sirve	1998–2001	Chargé d'affaires
Lauri Kangas (Nairobi)	1998–2003	Ambassador
Kari Toiviainen	2001–2004	Chargé d'affaires
Matti Kääriäinen (Nairobi)	2003–2004	Ambassador
Kirsti Aarnio	2004–2005	Chargé d'affaires
Kirsti Aarnio	2005–2009	Ambassador
Leo Olasvirta	2009–2013	Ambassador
Sirpa Mäenpää	2013–2016	Ambassador
Helena Airaksinen	2016–2020	Ambassador

=== Alger (Algeria) ===
Representative	Years	Status
Jussi Mäkinen	1963–1968	Ambassador
Olavi Saikku	1969–1972	Ambassador
Ossi Sunell	1972–1975	Ambassador
Osmo Orkomies	1975–1979	Ambassador
Osmo Kock	1979–1983	Ambassador
Pekka Malinen	1983–1985	Ambassador
Erkki Pajari	1985–1987	Ambassador
Risto Rännäli	1988–1991	Ambassador
Jan Groop (Tunis)	1991–1995; 1994–1995	Ambassador
Roope Jussila	1995–1996	Chargé d'Affaires
Carl-Erik Smedslund	1996–1997	Chargé d'Affaires
Carl-Erik Smedslund (Tunis)	1998–2002	Chargé d'Affaires
Kaija Ilander (Tunis)	2003–2007	Ambassador
Risto Veltheim (Helsinki)	2008–2011	Roving Ambassador
Hannele Voionmaa	2008–2011	Ambassador
Tuula Svinhufvud	2015– 2019	Ambassador
Marja Joenusva	2019-Incumbent	Ambassador

=== Dar es Salaam (Tanzania) ===
Representative	Years	Status
Henrik Blomstedt (Addis Abeba)	1966–1969	Ambassador
Joel Pekuri (Addis Abeba)	1969–1971	Ambassador
Seppo Pietinen	1971–1973	Ambassador
Martti Ahtisaari	1973–1977	Ambassador
Richard Müller	1977–1980	Ambassador
Risto Kauppi	1980–1983	Ambassador
Ilkka Ristimäki	1983–1987	Ambassador
Unto Korhonen	1987–1988	Ambassador
Kari Karanko	1988–1993	Ambassador
Ilari Rantakari	1994–1997	Ambassador
Ritva Jolkkonen	1998–2002	Ambassador
Jorma Paukku	2002–2007	Ambassador
Juhani Toivonen	2007–2011	Ambassador
Sinikka Antila	2011–2015	Ambassador
Pekka Hukka	2015-Incumbent	Ambassador

=== Cairo (Egypt) ===
Representative	Years	Status
Asko Ivalo (Rome)	1954–1959	Envoy
Atle Asanti	1959–1962	Ambassador
Osmo Orkomies	1962–1966	Ambassador
Soini Palasto	1966–1969	Ambassador
Pekka Malinen	1969–1974	Ambassador
Joel Pekuri	1975–1978	Ambassador
Björn-Olof Alholm	1979–1980	Ambassador
Olli Auero	1980–1984	Ambassador
Mauri Eggert	1984–1987	Ambassador
Antti Hynninen	1987–1989	Ambassador
Elisabeth Tigerstedt-Tähtelä	1990–1992	Ambassador
Garth Castrén	1992–1997	Ambassador
Aapo Pölhö	1998–2002	Ambassador
Hannes Mäntyvaara	2002–2005	Ambassador
Hannu Halinen	2005–2009	Ambassador
Roberto Tanzi-Albi	2009–2013	Ambassador
Tuula Yrjölä	2013–2016	Ambassador
Laura Kansikas-Debraise	2017-Incumbent	Ambassador

=== Lusaka (Zambia) ===
Representative	Years	Status
Henrik Blomstedt (Addis Abeba)	1968–1969	Ambassador
Joel Pekuri (Addis Abeba)	1969–1971	Ambassador
Seppo Pietinen (Addis Abeba)	1972–1973	Ambassador
Martti Ahtisaari (Addis Abeba)	1973–1976	Ambassador
Unto Korhonen	1976–1980	Ambassador
Erik Hellqvist	1980–1983	Ambassador
Garth Castrén	1984–1987	Ambassador
Risto Rekola	1987–1989	Ambassador
Ilari Rantakari (from 1994 Dar es Salaam)	1989–1993, 1994–1997	Ambassador
Ritva Jolkkonen (Dar es Salaam)	1998–2002	Ambassador
Jorma Paukku (Dar es Salaam)	2002–2007	Ambassador
Sinikka Antila	2007–2011	Ambassador
Pertti Anttinen	2011–2014	Ambassador
Timo Olkkonen	2014 –2019	Ambassador
Pirjo Suomela-Chowdhury	2019-Incumbent	Ambassador

=== Maputo (Mozambique) ===
Representative	Years	Status
Markku Kauppinen	2003–2007	Ambassador
Kari Alanko	2007–2011	Ambassador
Matti Kääriäinen	2011–2013	Ambassador
Seija Toro	2013–Incumbent	Ambassador

- Finland's diplomatic relations to Mozambique was Incumbented from Dar es Salaam (1975–1999) and Pretoria (1999–2003) Embassies

=== Nairobi (Kenya) ===
Representative	Years	Status
Henrik Blomstedt (Addis Abeba)	1966–1969	Ambassador
Joel Pekuri (Addis Abeba)	1969–1971	Ambassador
Veikko Hietanen (Addis Abeba)	1973–1977	Ambassador
Unto Tanskanen	1977–1980	Ambassador
Raimo Salmi	1980–1983	Ambassador
Tom Grönberg	1983–1987	Ambassador
Ilkka Ristimäki	1987–1990	Ambassador
David Johansson	1990–1995	Ambassador
Glen Lindholm	1995–1998	Ambassador
Lauri Kangas	1998–2003	Ambassador
Matti Kääriäinen	2003–2007	Ambassador
Heli Sirve	2007–2011	Ambassador
Sofie From-Emmesberger	2011–2015	Ambassador
Tarja Fernández	2015–2018	Ambassador
Erik Lundberg	2018-Incumbent	Ambassador

=== Pretoria (South Africa) ===
Representative	Years	Status
Helge von Knorring	1949–1952	Chargé d'Affaires
Armas Yöntilä	1952–1957	Chargé d'Affaires
Hans Ruben Martola	1957–1964	Chargé d'Affaires
Tauno Nevalainen	1964–1969	Chargé d'Affaires
Jaakko Lyytinen	1969–1971	Chargé d'Affaires
Kurt Uggeldahl	1971–1974	Chargé d'Affaires
Kari Härkönen	1974–1977	Chargé d'Affaires
Juha Puromies	1977–1980	Chargé d'Affaires
Pertti Kaukonen	1980–1984	Chargé d'Affaires
Erik Hagfors	1984–1988	Chargé d'Affaires
Hannu Mäntyvaara	1988–1990	Chargé d'Affaires
Hannu Uusi-Videnoja	1990–1991	Chargé d'Affaires
Hannu Uusi-Videnoja	1991	Chargé d'Affaires
Björn Ekblom	1991–1995	Ambassador
Tapani Brotherus	1995–2000	Ambassador
Kirsti Lintonen	2000–2005	Ambassador
Heikki Tuunanen	2005–2009	Ambassador
Tiina Myllyntausta	2009–2012	Ambassador
Petri Salo	2012–2016	Ambassador
Kari Alanko	2016-Incumbent	Ambassador

=== Rabat (Morocco) ===
Representative	Years	Status
Antti Rytövuori	2007–2011	Ambassador
Christina Harttila	2011–2015	Ambassador
Anne Vasara	2015–Incumbent	Ambassador

- Finland's diplomatic relations to Morocco was Incumbented from Rome (1959–1961), Algeries (1963–1968), Vienna (1968–1970), Madrid (1970–1990), Lisbon (1992–2007) embassies

=== Tunis (Tunisia) ===
Representative	Years	Status
Asko Ivalo (Rome)	1959–1961	Envoy
T. O. Vahervuori (Rome)	1961–1964	Envoy
Jussi Mäkinen (Algiers)	1964–1968	Ambassador
Olavi Saikku (Algiers)	1969–1972	Ambassador
Ossi Sunell (Algiers)	1972–1975	Ambassador
Osmo Orkomies (Algiers)	1975–1979	Ambassador
Osmo Kock (Algiers)	1980–1983	Ambassador
Pekka Malinen (Algiers)	1983–1985	Ambassador
Erkki Pajari (Algiers)	1985–1987	Ambassador
Risto Rännäli (Algiers)	1988–1991	Ambassador
Jan Groop (Algiers, from 1994 Tunis)	1991–1995	Ambassador
Roope Jussila	1995–1996	Chargé d'Affaires
Carl-Erik Smedslund	1996–1998	Chargé d'Affaires
Carl-Erik Smedslund	1998–2002	Chargé d'Affaires
Kaija Ilander	2003–2007	Ambassador
Laura Reinilä	2007–2010	Ambassador
Tiina Jortikka-Laitinen	2010–2013	Ambassador
Tanja Jääskeläinen	2013–2017	Ambassador
Leena Gardemeister	2017-Incumbent	Ambassador

=== Windhoek (Namibia) ===
Representative	Years	Status
Lauri Kangas	1990	Chargé d'Affaires
Kirsti Lintonen	1990–1994	Ambassador
Yrjö Karinen	1994–1998	Ambassador
Kari Karanko	1998–2000	Ambassador
Sinikka Antila	2001–2003	Chargé d'Affaires
Kirsti Lintonen (Pretoria)	2000–2005	Ambassador
Seija Kinni-Huttunen	2003–2008	Chargé d'Affaires
Asko Luukkainen	2008–2011	Chargé d'Affaires
Heikki Tuunanen (Pretoria)	2005–2010	Ambassador
Tiina Myllyntausta (Windhoek/Pretoria)	2010–2011	Ambassador
Anne Saloranta	2011–2014	Chargé d'Affaires
Anne Saloranta	2014–2017	Ambassador

== Asia ==
=== Ankara (Turkey) ===
Representative	Years	Status
Väinö Tanner (Bucharest)	1920–1923	Chargé d'Affaires
Pontus Artti (Rome)	1931–1934	Envoy
Onni Talas (Budapest)	1934–1940	Envoy
Aarno Yrjö-Koskinen	1940–1951	Envoy
Asko Ivalo	1951–1954	Envoy
Bruno Kivikoski	1958–1959	Envoy
Bruno Kivikoski	1958–1959	Ambassador
Aaro Pakaslahti	1959–1966	Ambassador
Hans Ruben Martola	1966–1967	Ambassador
Åke Frey	1968–1974	Ambassador
Wilhelm Schreck	1974–1976	Ambassador
Ulf-Erik Slotte	1977–1983	Ambassador
Klaus Castrén	1983–1986	Ambassador
Mauno Castrén	1986–1991	Ambassador
Risto Kauppi	1991–1995	Ambassador
Jan Groop	1995–1997	Ambassador
Björn Ekblom	1998–2000	Ambassador
Garth Castrén	2000–2004	Ambassador
Maria Serenius	2004–2008	Ambassador
Kirsti Eskeinen	2008–2012	Ambassador
Nina Vaskunlahti	2012–2016	Ambassador
Päivi Kairamo	2016–2019	Ambassador
Ari Mäki	2019–2023	Ambassador
Pirkko Hämäläinen	2023–Incumbent	Ambassador

=== Astana (Kazakhstan) ===
Representative	Years	Status
Antti Koistinen	1993–1996	Roving Ambassador
Taisto Tolvanen	1996–2000	Roving Ambassador
Tapio Saarela	2000–2004	Roving Ambassador
Marja-Liisa Kiljunen	2004–2008	Roving Ambassador
Timo Lahelma	2008–2010	Roving Ambassador
Mikko Kinnunen	2009–2013	Ambassador
Ilkka Räisänen	2013–2017	Ambassador
Mikko Kivikoski	2017-Incumbent	Ambassador

=== Abu Dhabi (United Arab Emirates) ===
Representative	Years	Status
Carolus Lassila (Jeddah)	1975–1977	Ambassador
Kai Helenius (Jeddah)	1977–1982	Ambassador
Pertti Ripatti (Kuwait City)	1982–1985	Ambassador
Esko Kunnamo (Kuwait City)	1985–1989	Ambassador
Tero Lehtovaara (Kuwait City/Helsinki)	1989–1991	Ambassador
Aleksei Lahden	1991–1994	Chargé d'Affaires
Pertti Kaukonen (Kuwait City)	1992–1997	Ambassador
Matti Pullinen	1997–2000	Ambassador
Risto Rekola	2000–2004	Ambassador
Raimo Anttola	2004–2007	Ambassador
Matti Lassila	2007–2011	Ambassador
Ilkka-Pekka Similä	2011–2015	Ambassador
Riittamaija Swan	2015–Incumbent	Ambassador

=== Baghdad (Iraq) ===
Representative	Years	Status
Aaro Pakaslahti	1959–1966	Envoy
Arto Tanner	1967–1969	Chargé d'Affaires
Martti Lintulahti	1969–1973	Chargé d'Affaires
Martti Lintulahti	1973–1975	Ambassador
Jaakko Keto	1975–1977	Ambassador
Jan Groop	1978–1981	Ambassador
Håkan Krogius	1981–1987	Ambassador
Henry Söderholm	1987–1990	Ambassador
Arne Hartman	1990–1991	Ambassador

- The Embassy was closed during the Gulf War.

=== Bangkok (Thailand) ===
Representative	Years	Status
Gustaf Ramstedt (Tokyo)	1919–1929	Chargé d'Affaires
Hugo Valvanne (New Delhi)	1954–1956	Envoy
Aaro Pakaslahti (New Delhi)	1958–1959	Envoy
Sigurd von Numers (New Delhi)	1959–1961	Envoy
Veli Helenius (New Delhi)	1961–1964	Envoy
Veli Helenius (New Delhi)	1961–1964	Ambassador
Asko Ivalo (New Delhi)	1964–1968	Ambassador
Fredrik Schreck (New Delhi)	1968–1974	Ambassador
Matti Cawén (Jakarta)	1975–1977	Ambassador
Tuure Mentula (Jakarta)	1977–1982	Ambassador
Klaus Snellman	1983–1984	Ambassador
Pasi Rutanen	1984–1986	Ambassador
Benjamin Bassin	1986–1990	Ambassador
Eero Salovaara	1990–1995	Ambassador
Tauno Kääriä	1995–2000	Ambassador
Heikki Tuunanen	2000–2005	Ambassador
Lars Backström	2005–2009	Ambassador
Sirpa Mäenpää	2009–2013	Ambassador
Kirsti Westphalen	2013–2016	Ambassador
Satu Suikkari-Kleven	2016–Incumbent	Ambassador

=== Beirut (Lebanon) ===
Representative	Years	Status
Bruno Kivikoski	Envoy (Ankara)	1954–1958
Atle Asanti	Envoy (Cairo)	1959–1962
Osmo Orkomies	Ambassador (Cairo)	1962–1966
Soini Palasto	Ambassador (Cairo)	1966– 1968
Carolus Lassila	Ambassador	1968–1974
Heikki Kalha	Ambassador	1974
Arto Tanner	Ambassador	1977–1981
Veikko Hietanen	Ambassador	1981–1984
Jyrki Aimonen	Ambassador (Damascus)	1985
Juhani Muhonen	Ambassador (Damascus)	
Arto Kurittu	Ambassador (Damascus)	1991–1995
Heikki Latvanen	Ambassador (Damascus)	1996–2001
Antti Koistinen	Ambassador (Damascus)	2001–2005
Pertti Harvola	Ambassador (Damascus)	2005–2008
Harri Mäki-Reinikka	Ambassador (Damascus- Beirut)	2008–2012
Kari Kahiluoto	Ambassador (Damascus- Beirut)	2013–2014
Matti Lassila	Ambassador	2015–2018
Tarja Fernández	Ambassador	2018–incumbent

=== Canberra (Australia) ===
Representative	Years	Status
Paavo Simelius (Sydney)	1949–1958	Chargé d'Affaires
Toivo Kala (Sydney)	1958–1963	Chargé d'Affaires
Olavi Wanne (Sydney)	1963–1968	Chargé d'Affaires
Tuure Mentula	1969–1975	Ambassador
Åke Backström	1975–1980	Ambassador
Veikko Huttunen	1980–1983	Ambassador
Osmo Lares	1983–1987	Ambassador
Ulf-Erik Slotte	1987–1991	Ambassador
Charles Murto	1991–1996	Ambassador
Esko Hamilo	1996–2001	Ambassador
Anneli Puura-Märkälä	2001–2005	Ambassador
Glen Lindholm	2005–2009	Ambassador
Maija Lähteenmäki	2010–2012	Ambassador
Pasi Patokallio	2013–2016	Ambassador
Lars Backström	2016–2020	Ambassador
Satu Mattila-Budich	2020–	Ambassador

=== Damascus (Syria) ===
Representative	Years	Status
Bruno Kivikoski (Ankara)	1954–1958	Envoy
Asko Ivalo (Rome)	1958–1959	Ambassador
Soini Palasto (Cairo)	1966–1969	Ambassador
Pekka Malinen (Cairo)	1969–1974	Ambassador
Joel Pekuri (Cairo)	1975–1978	Ambassador
Arto Tanner (Beirut)	1979–1981	Ambassador
Veikko Hietanen (Beirut)	1981–1984	Ambassador
Jyrki Aimonen	1984–1988	Ambassador
Juhani Muhonen	1988–1991	Ambassador
Arto Kurittu	1991–1995	Ambassador
Heikki Latvanen	1996–2001	Ambassador
Antti Koistinen	2001–2005	Ambassador
Pertti Harvola	2005–2008	Ambassador
Harri Mäki-Reinikka (Beirut)	2008–2012	Ambassador
Kari Kahiluoto (Beirut)	2012–2015	Ambassador
Matti Lassila (Beirut)	2015 –2018	Chargé d'affaires
Tarja Fernández (Beirut)	2018-Incumbent	Ambassador

=== Beijing ===
==== Republic of China ====
Representative	Years	Status
G. J. Ramstedt (Tokyo)	1919–1929	Chargé d'Affaires
Karl Gustaf Wähämäki (Shanghai)	1930–1931	Chargé d'Affaires
Helge von Knorring (Shanghai)	1931–1932	Chargé d'Affaires
Hugo Valvanne (Tokyo)	1936–1939	Envoy
Harald Tanner (Shanghai)	1939–1945	Chargé d'Affaires

==== People's Republic of China ====
Representative	Years	Status
Hugo Valvanne (New Delhi)	1950–1952	Envoy
Helge von Knorring	1952–1953	Envoy
Cay Sundström	1953–1954	Envoy
Cay Sundström	1954–1959	Ambassador
Hugo Valvanne	1959–1961	Ambassador
Joel Toivola	1961–1967	Ambassador
Veli Helenius	1967–1974	Ambassador
Martti Salomies	1974–1976	Ambassador
Pentti Suomela	1976–1984	Ambassador
Risto Hyvärinen	1984–1989	Ambassador
Arto Mansala	1989–1992	Ambassador
Ilkka Ristimäki	1992–1997	Ambassador
Pasi Rutanen	1997–2001	Ambassador
Benjamin Bassin	2001–2005	Ambassador
Antti Kuosmanen	2005–2009	Ambassador
Lars Backström	2009–2013	Ambassador
Jari Gustafsson	2013–2015	Ambassador
Marja Rislakki	2015–2017	Ambassador
Jarno Syrjälä	2017-2021	Ambassador
Leena-Kaisa Mikkola	2021-2024	Ambassador

=== Hanoi (Vietnam) ===
Representative	Years	Status
Veli Helenius (Beijing)	1973–1974	Ambassador
Unto Tanskanen	1974–1977	Ambassador
Mauri Eggert	1977–1980	Ambassador
Unto Korhonen	1980–1983	Ambassador
Esko Lipponen	1983–1986	Ambassador
Eero Saarikoski	1986–1987	Ambassador
Elisabeth Tigerstedt-Tähtelä	1988–1989	Ambassador
Esko Lipponen	1990–1991	Ambassador
Kai Granholm	1991–1996	Ambassador
Juha Puromies	1996–2001	Ambassador
Kari Alanko	2002–2007	Ambassador
Pekka Hyvönen	2007–2011	Ambassador
Kimmo Lähdevirta	2011–2015	Ambassador
Ilkka-Pekka Similä	2015–2017	Ambassador
Kari Kahiluoto	2017-Incumbent	Ambassador

=== Islamabad (Pakistan) ===
Representative	Years	Status
Asko Ivalo (Ankara)	1951–1954	
Bruno Kivikoski (Ankara)	1954–1959	
Aaro Pakaslahti (Ankara)	1959–1966	
Hans Martola (Ankara)	1966–1967	
Åke Frey (Ankara)	1968–1974	
Kurt Uggeldahl (Tehran)	1975–1979	
Unto Tanskanen (Tehran)	1980–1983	
Timo Jalkanen	1983–1987	
Tapani Brotherus (Tehran)	1987–1991	
Eero Saarikoski (Tehran)	1991–1996	
Antti Koistinen (Tehran)	1997–2001	
Tarja Laitiainen (Helsinki)	2002–2005	
Pirjo Mustonen	2005–2008	Ambassador
Osmo Lipponen	2008–Embassy closed	
Rauli Suikkanen	2012–Incumbent	

- Finland's diplomatic relations to Pakistan was Incumbented by Ankara (1951–1974) and Tehran (1974–2001) Embassies

=== Jakarta (Indonesia) ===
Representative	Years	Status
Hugo Valvanne (New Delhi)	1954–1956	Envoy
Aaro Pakaslahti (New Delhi)	1958–1959	Envoy
Sigurd von Numers (New Delhi)	1959–1961	Envoy
Veli Helenius (New Delhi)	1961–1964	Envoy
Asko Ivalo (New Delhi)	1964–1968	Ambassador
Wilhelm Schreck (New Delhi)	1968–1974	Ambassador
Matti Cawén	1974–1977	Ambassador
Tuure Mentula	1977–1982	Ambassador
Pertti A. O. Kärkkäinen	1982–1985	Ambassador
Erik Heinrichs	1985–1989	Ambassador
Timo Koponen	1989–1992	Ambassador
Veli J. Ollikainen	1992–1995	Ambassador
Hannu Himanen	1996–2000	Ambassador
Matti Pullinen	2000–2003	Ambassador
Markku Niinioja	2003–2007	Ambassador
Antti Koistinen	2007–2010	Ambassador
Kai Sauer	2010–2014	Ambassador
Päivi Hiltunen-Toivio	2014–2018	Ambassador
Jari Sinkari	2018-Incumbent	Ambassador

=== Kabul (Afghanistan) ===
Representative	Years	Status
Eero A. Wuori (Moscow)	1956–1963	Ambassador
Jorma Vanamo (Moscow)	1963–1967	Ambassador
Åke Frey (Ankara)	1968–1974	Ambassador
Jaakko Hallama (Moscow)	1975–1982	Ambassador
Tarja Laitiainen (Helsinki)	2002–2005	Ambassador
Antti Koistinen (Helsinki)	2006–2008	Ambassador
Timo Oula	2005–2008	Chargé d'affaires
Timo Oula	2009–2010	Ambassador
Pauli Järvenpää	2010–2013	Ambassador
Ari Mäki	2013–2015	Ambassador
Anne Meskanen	2015–2017	Ambassador
Hannu Ripatti	2017–Incumbent	Ambassador

=== Katmandu (Nepal) ===
Representative	Years	Status
Riitta Örö (New Delhi)	1975–1979	Ambassador
Risto Hyvärinen (New Delhi)	1980–1984	Ambassador
Jan Groop (New Delhi)	1984–1988	Ambassador
Jyrki Aimonen (New Delhi)	1988–1991	Ambassador
Marjatta Rasi (New Delhi)	1991–1995	Ambassador
Kalevi Ahti	1992–1996	Chargé d'Affaires
Benjamin Bassin (New Delhi)	1995–2001	Ambassador
Esa Hurtig	1996–2000	Chargé d'Affaires
Asko Luukkainen	2000–2004	Chargé d'Affaires
Glen Lindholm (New Delhi)	2001–2005	Ambassador
Pauli Mustonen	2004–2006	Chargé d'Affaires
Asko Numminen (New Delhi)	2005–2009	Ambassador
Kari Karanko	2006–2007	Chargé d'Affaires
Pirkko-Liisa Kyöstilä	2007–2011	Chargé d'Affaires
Terhi Hakala (New Delhi)	2009–2011	Ambassador
Asko Luukkainen (Kathmandu)	2011–2015	Ambassador
Jorma Suvanto (Kathmandu)	2015–2018	Ambassador
Pertti Anttinen (Kathmandu)	2018-Incumbent	Ambassador

=== Kuala Lumpur (Malaysia) ===
Representative	Status	Years
Matti Cawén (Jakarta)	1975–1977	Ambassador
Tuure Mentula (Jakarta)	1977–1982	Ambassador
Pertti Kärkkäinen (Jakarta)	1983–1985	Ambassador
Erik Heinrichs (Jakarta)	1985–1988	Ambassador
Erik Hellqvist	1988–1989	Ambassador
Pertti Ripatti	1989–1992	Ambassador
Ilkka Ruso	1992–1996	Ambassador
Erkki Huittinen	1996–2000	Ambassador
Unto Turunen	2000–2004	Ambassador
Lauri Korpinen	2004–2008	Ambassador
Tapio Saarela	2008–2012	Ambassador
Matti Pullinen	2012–Incumbent	Ambassador

=== Kuwait ===
Representative	Status	Years
Carolus Lassila (Beirut)	1969–1974	Ambassador
Heikki Kahla (Beirut)	1975–1977	Ambassador
Arto Tanner (Beirut)	1977–1980	Ambassador
Pertti Ripatti	1981–1985	Ambassador
Esko Kunnamo	1985–1989	Ambassador
Tero Lehtovaara	1989–1992	Ambassador
Pertti Kaukonen	1992–1998	Ambassador
Markku Niinioja	1998–2002	Ambassador

- Finland's diplomatic relations to Kuwait is Incumbented by the Embassy in Riyadh since 2002.

=== Manila (Philippines) ===
Representative	Years	Status
Ragnar Smedslund (Tokyo)	1958–1962	Envoy
Viljo Ahokas (Tokyo)	1962–1968	Ambassador
Åke Wihtol (Tokyo)	1968–1971	Ambassador
Aarno Karhilo (Tokyo)	1971–1972	Ambassador
Osmo Lares (Tokyo)	1973–1978	Ambassador
Henrik Blomstedt (Tokyo)	1978–1980	Ambassador
Klaus Snellman	1983–1984	Ambassador
Pasi Rutanen	1984–1986	Ambassador
Timo Jalkanen	1987–1991	Ambassador
Juha Puromies	1991–1993	Ambassador
Eero Salovaara (Bangkok)	1993–?	Ambassador
Juha Kuusi	1993–?	Ambassador
Pertti Majanen	1997–2000	Ambassador
Raimo Anttola	2000–2004	Ambassador
Riitta Resch	2004–2008	Ambassador
Heikki Hannikainen	2008–2012	Ambassador
Juha Markus Pyykkö	2020–	Ambassador

- Finland's diplomatic relations with the Philippines were redirected to the Embassy in Kuala Lumpur from 2012 until 2020, when the Finnish government reopened the embassy in Manila and inaugurated honorary consulates in Cebu and Davao.

=== New Delhi (India) ===
Representative	Status	Years
Hugo Valvanne	1949–1956	Envoy
Aaro Pakaslahti	1956–1959	Envoy
Sigurd von Numers	1959–1961	Envoy
Sigurd von Numers	1960–1961	Ambassador
Veli Helenius	1961–1964	Ambassador
Asko Ivalo	1964–1968	Ambassador
Wilhelm Schreck	1968–1974	Ambassador
Riitta Örö	1974–1979	Ambassador
Risto Hyvärinen	1979–1984	Ambassador
Jan Groop	1984–1988	Ambassador
Jyrki Aimonen	1988–1991	Ambassador
Marjatta Rasi	1991–1995	Ambassador
Benjamin Bassin	1995–2001	Ambassador
Glen Lindholm	2001–2005	Ambassador
Asko Numminen	2005–2009	Ambassador
Terhi Hakala	2009–2016	Ambassador
Aapo Pölhö	2013–2016	Ambassador
Nina Vaskunlahti	2016–Incumbent	Ambassador

=== Riyadh (Saudi Arabia) ===
Representative	Years	Status
Carolus Lassila (Beirut, from 1974 Jeddah)	1971–1977	Ambassador
Kai Helenius (Jeddah)	1977–1982	Ambassador
Unto Turunen (Jeddah, from 1985 Riyadh)	1983–1987	Ambassador
Pekka Harttila	1987–1991	Ambassador
Osmo Väinölä	1991–1993	Ambassador
Antero Viertiö	1993–1996	Ambassador
Kai Granholm	1996–2001	Ambassador
Heikki Puurunen	2001–2005	Ambassador
Martti Isoaro	2005–2010	Ambassador
Jarno Syrjälä	2010–2014	Ambassador
Pekka Voutilainen	2014–2018	Ambassador
Antti Rytövuori	2018-Incumbent	Ambassador

=== Seoul (South Korea) ===
Representative	Years	Status
Osmo Lares (Tokyo)	1973–1978	Ambassador
Henrik Blomstedt (Tokyo)	1978–1984	Ambassador
Pauli Opas (Tokyo)	1984–1985	Ambassador
Juha Puromies (Tokyo)	1986–1991	Ambassador
Jorma Julin	1991–1996	Ambassador
Unto Turunen	1996–2000	Ambassador
Lauri Korpinen	2000–2004	Ambassador
Kim Luotonen	2004–2008	Ambassador
Pekka Wuoristo	2008–2012	Ambassador
Matti Heimonen	2012–2016	Ambassador
Eero Suominen	2016-Incumbent	Ambassador

=== Singapore ===
Representative	Years	Status
Wilhelm Schreck (New Delhi)	1973–1974	Ambassador
Riitta Örö (New Delhi)	1975–1979	Ambassador
Risto Hyvärinen (New Delhi)	1980–1982	Ambassador
Pertti Kärkkäinen (Jakarta)	1982–1985	Ambassador
Erik Heinrichs (Jakarta)	1985–1989	Ambassador
Timo Koponen (Jakarta)	1989–1992	Ambassador
Veli J. Ollikainen (Jakarta)	1992–1996	Ambassador
Jukka Leino	1994–1996	Chargé d'Affaires
Jukka Leino	1996–2000	Ambassador
Kim Luotonen	2000–2004	Ambassador
Risto Rekola	2004–2007	Ambassador
Satu Mattila-Budich	2007–2011	Ambassador
Ari Heikkinen	2011–2015	Ambassador
Paula Parviainen	2015-Incumbent	

=== Tehran (Iran) ===
Representative	Years	Status
Aarno Yrjö-Koskinen (Moscow)	1934–1940	Envoy
Aarno Yrjö-Koskinen (Ankara)	1948–1951	Envoy
Asko Ivalo (Ankara)	1951–1954	Envoy
Bruno Kivikoski (Ankara)	1954–1959	Envoy
Aaro Pakaslahti (Ankara)	1959–1965	Envoy
Aaro Pakaslahti (Ankara)	1965–1966	Ambassador
Hans Ruben Martola (Ankara)	1966–1967	Ambassador
Åke Frey (Ankara)	1968–1974	Ambassador
Kurt Uggeldahl	1974–1979	Ambassador
Martti Salomies	1979	Ambassador
Unto Tanskanen	1980–1983	Ambassador
Timo Jalkanen	1983–1987	Ambassador
Tapani Brotherus	1987–1991	Ambassador
Eero Saarikoski	1991–1996	Ambassador
Antti Koistinen	1996–2001	Ambassador
Yrjö Karinen	2001–2005	Ambassador
Heikki Puurunen	2005–2009	Ambassador
Harri Salmi	2009–2012	Ambassador
Harri Kämäräinen	2012– 2017	Ambassador
Keijo Norvanto	2017-Incumbent	Ambassador

=== Tel Aviv (Israel) ===
Representative	Years	Status
Toivo Ilmari Kala	1952–1958	Chargé d'Affaires
Joel Toivola	1958–1961	Chargé d'Affaires
Risto Solanko	1961–1962	Chargé d'Affaires
Risto Solanko	1962–1964	Ambassador
Hans Ruben Martola	1964–1966	Ambassador
Algar von Heiroth	1966–1975	Ambassador
Matti Kahiluoto	1975–1981	Ambassador
Paaso Helminen	1981–1982	Ambassador
Erkki Mäentakanen	1982–1984	Ambassador
Taneli Kekkonen	1984–1985	Ambassador
Osmo Väinölä	1985–1989	Ambassador
Pekka J. Korvenheimo	1989–1993	Ambassador
Arto Tanner	1993–1997	Ambassador
Pasi Patokallio	1998–2003	Ambassador
Kari Veijalainen	2003–2007	Ambassador
Per-Mikael Engberg	2007–2011	Ambassador
Leena-Kaisa Mikkola	2011–2016	Ambassador
Anu Saarela	2016–Incumbent	Ambassador

=== Yangon (Myanmar) ===
Representative	Years	Status
Riikka Laatu	2017-Incumbent	Ambassador

== Europe ==
=== Athens (Greece) ===
Representative	Years	Status
Väinö Tanner (Bucharest)	1920–1923	Chargé d'Affaires
Pontus Artti (Rome)	1931–1936	Envoy
Rafael Erich (Rome)	1936–1938	Envoy
Eero Järnefelt (Rome)	1938–1940	Envoy
Niilo Orasmaa (Belgrade)	1954–1956	Envoy
Otso Wartiovaara (Belgrade)	1956–1961	Envoy
Olavi Raustila (Belgrade)	1961–1965	Envoy
Olavi Raustila (Belgrade)	1965	Envoy
Taneli Kekkonen (Belgrade)	1966–1970	Ambassador
Olli Bergman (Belgrade)	1970–1972	Ambassador
Risto Hyvärinen (Belgrade)	1972–1975	Ambassador
Eeva-Kristiina Forsman	1976–1977	Ambassador
Heikki Kalha	1977–1980	Ambassador
Eva-Christina Mäkeläinen	1980–1985	Ambassador
Paul Jyrkänkallio	1985–1988	Ambassador
Erkki Tiilikainen	1988–1992	Ambassador
Ralf Friberg	1992–1995	Ambassador
Antti Lassila	1995–1997	Ambassador
Arto Tanner	1998–2000	Ambassador
Tapani Brotherus	2000–2003	Ambassador
Ole Norrback	2003–2007	Ambassador
Erkki Huittinen	2007–2011	Ambassador
Pekka Lintu	2011–2014	Ambassador
Pauli Mäkelä	2014–2016	Ambassador
Juha Pyykkö	2017 -Incumbent	Ambassador

=== Belgrade ===
==== Kingdom of Yugoslavia ====
Representative	Years	Status
Onni Talas (Budapest)	1934–1940	Envoy
Eduard Palin (Bucharest)	1941	Envoy

==== Socialist Federal Republic of Yugoslavia ====
Representative	Years	Status
Ville Niskanen	1948–1953	Envoy
Niilo Orasmaa	1953–1956	Envoy
Otso Wartiovaara	1956–1958	Envoy
Otso Wartiovaara	1958–1961	Ambassador
Olavi Raustila	1961–1965	Ambassador
Taneli Kekkonen	1965–1970	Ambassador
Olli Bergman	1970–1972	Ambassador
Risto Hyvärinen	1972–1975	Ambassador
Eeva-Kristiina Forsman	1975–1980	Ambassador
Matti Kahiluoto	1981–1984	Ambassador
Heikki Talvitie	1984–1988	Ambassador
Jorma Inki	1988–1991	Ambassador

==== Serbia and Montenegro ====
Representative	Years	Status
Mauno Castrén	1991–1992	Ambassador
Ilpo Manninen	1994–1998	Chargé d'Affaires
Hannu Mäntyvaara	1998–2002	Ambassador

==== Serbia ====
Representative	Years	Status
Anna-Maija Korpi	2002–2007	Ambassador
Kari Veijalainen	2007–2011	Ambassador
Pekka Orpana	2011–2015	Ambassador
Pertti Ikonen	2015–Incumbent	Ambassador

=== Berlin ===
==== Germany ====
- Finland's Representative at the German Empire and Weimar Republic based in Berlin.

Representative	Years	Status
Edvard Hjelt	1918	Chargé d'Affaires
Edvard Hjelt	1918–1919	Envoy
Juho Jännes	1919–1920	Envoy
Harri Holma	1920–1921	Chargé d'Affaires
Harri Holma	1921–1927	Envoy
Wäinö Wuolijoki	1927–1933	Envoy
Aarne Wuorimaa	1933–1940	Envoy
Toivo Kivimäki	1940–1944	Envoy

==== German Democratic Republic ====
- Finland's Representative at the German Democratic Republic based in East Berlin.

Representative	Years	Status
Esko Vaartela	1973–1974	Ambassador
Osmo Kock	1974–1979	Ambassador
Kuuno Honkonen	1979–1983	Ambassador
Ensio Helaniemi	1983–1986	Ambassador
Arto Tanner	1986–1990	Ambassador

==== Federal Republic of Germany ====
- Finland's Representative at the Federal Republic of Germany based in Bonn.

Representative	Years	Status
Yrjö Väänänen	1973–1974	Ambassador
Björn-Olof Alholm	1974–1977	Ambassador
Pentti Talvitie	1977–1979	Ambassador
Arvo Rytkönen	1979–1980	Ambassador
Heikki Kalha	1980–1985	Ambassador
Antti Karppinen	1985–1990	Ambassador

==== Germany ====
- Finland's Representative at the Federal Republic of Germany based in Berlin.

Representative	Years	Status
Kai Helenius	1990–1996	Ambassador
Arto Mansala	1996–2001	Ambassador
Leif Fagernäs	2001–2004	Ambassador
René Nyberg	2004–2008	Ambassador
Harry Helenius	2008–2011	Ambassador
Päivi Luostarinen	2011–2015	Ambassador
Ritva Koukku-Ronde	2015–Incumbent	Ambassador

=== Bern (Switzerland) ===
Representative	Years	Status
Rafael Erich (Geneva)	1926–1927	Envoy
Rudolf Holsti (Geneva)	1927–1940	Envoy
Hugo Valvanne	1940–1941	Chargé d'Affaires
Tapio Voionmaa	1941–1946	Envoy
Heikki Leppo	1946–1948	Chargé d'Affaires
Reinhold Svento	1948–1951	Envoy
Åke Gartz	1951–1953	Envoy
Helge von Knorring	1953–1956	Envoy
Hugo Valvanne	1956–1957	Envoy
Hugo Valvanne	1957–1959	Ambassador
Osmo Orkomies	1959–1962	Ambassador
Olavi Munkki	1962–1965	Ambassador
Ragnar Smedslund	1965–1967	Ambassador
Björn-Olof Alholm	1968–1970	Ambassador
Martti Salomies	1970–1974	Ambassador
Kaarlo Mäkelä	1974–1976	Ambassador
Joel Toivola	1976–1982	Ambassador
Richard Tötterman	1983–1990	Ambassador
Paavo Kaarlehto	1990–1992	Ambassador
Henry Söderholm	1992–1996	Ambassador
Olli Mennander	1996–2001	Ambassador
Antti Hynninen	2001–2005	Ambassador
Pekka Ojanen	2005–2009	Ambassador
Alpo Rusi	2009–2014	Ambassador
Jari Luoto	2014–2017	Ambassador
Timo Rajakangas	2017-2021	Ambassador
Valtteri Hirvonen	2021-2025	Ambassador
Okko-Pekka Salmimies	2025-	Ambassador

=== Bratislava ===
==== Republic of Slovakia (1939–1945) ====
Representative	Years	Status
Toivo Kivimäki (Berlin)	1940–1944	Envoy
Tauno Suontausta	1943–1944	Chargé d'Affaires
Ernst Bertil Sohlberg	1944	Chargé d'Affaires

==== Slovak Republic (1993–) ====
Representative	Years	Status
Pauli Opas (Prague)	1993–1994	Ambassador
Esko Rajakoski (Prague)	1994–1999	Ambassador
Risto Rännäli (Prague)	1999–2001	Ambassador
Tom Grönberg (Vienna)	2001–2004	Ambassador
Rauno Viemerö	2004–2008	Ambassador
Jukka Leino	2008–2012	Ambassador
Henna Knuuttila	2012–2015	Chargé d'affaires
Helena Tuuri (Prague)	2015–Incumbent	Ambassador

- Bratislava Embassy was closed in 2015.

=== Brussels (Belgium) ===
Representative	Years	Status
Yrjö Saastamoinen (The Hague)	1920	Chargé d'Affaires
G. A. Gripenberg (The Hague)	1921–1923	Chargé d'Affaires
Yrjö Saastamoinen (The Hague)	1923–1924	Chargé d'Affaires
Yrjö Saastamoinen (The Hague)	1924–1925	Chargé d'Affaires
Carl Enckell (Paris)	1926–1927	Envoy
Harri Holma (Paris)	1927–1938	Envoy
Leonard Åström	1938–1939	Envoy
Hugo Valvanne	1939–1940	Envoy
Ragnar Numelin	1947–1956	Envoy
Tapio Voionmaa	1950–1957	Envoy
Lauri Hjelt	1957–1959	Ambassador
Alexander Thesleff	1959–1963	Ambassador
Olavi Murto	1963–1967	Ambassador
Reino Honkaranta	1967–1970	Ambassador
Aarni Talvitie	1970–1975	Ambassador
Åke Wihtol	1975–1981	Ambassador
Paavo Kaarlehto	1981–1985	Ambassador
Heikki Talvitie	1985–1991	Ambassador
Olli Mennander	1991–1995	Ambassador
Aapo Pölhö	2007–2011	Ambassador
Per-Mikael Engberg	2011–2015	Ambassador
Timo Ranta	2015-2018	Ambassador
Riitta Resch	2018-2022	
Jouko Leinonen	2022-Incumbent	

=== Budapest (Hungary) ===
Representative	Years	Status
Gustaf Idman (Copenhagen)	1922–1927	Envoy
E. N. Setälä (Copenhagen)	1927–1930	Envoy
Onni Talas (Copenhagen)	1930–1934	Envoy
Onni Talas	1934–1940	Envoy
Aarne Wuorimaa	1940–1944	Envoy
Uno Koistinen	1950–1951	Chargé d'Affaires
Lauri Hjelt	1951–1957	Chargé d'Affaires
Toivo Heikkilä	1957–1960	Chargé d'Affaires
Toivo Heikkilä	1960–1963	Ambassador
Reino Palas	1963–1965	Ambassador
Olavi Raustila	1965–1969	Ambassador
Martti Ingman	1969–1973	Ambassador
Paul Jyrkänkallio	1973–1977	Ambassador
Kaarlo Yrjö-Koskinen	1977–1979	Ambassador
Osmo Väinölä	1979–1985	Ambassador
Arto Mansala	1985–1989	Ambassador
Risto Hyvärinen	1989–1992	Ambassador
Pertti Torstila	1992–1996	Ambassador
Jaakko Kaurinkoski	1996–1998	Ambassador
Hannu Halinen	1998–2002	Ambassador
Pekka Kujasalo	2002–2007	Ambassador
Jari Vilén	2007–2012	Ambassador
Pasi Tuominen	2012–2015	Ambassador
Petri Tuomi-Nikula	2016–2018	Ambassador
Markku Virri	2018-Incumbent	Ambassador

=== Bucharest (Romania) ===
Representative	Years	Status
Väinö Tanner	1920	ReRepresentative
Väinö Tanner (Warsaw)	1920–1921	Chargé d'Affaires
Väinö Tanner (Warsaw)	1921–1923	Envoy
Hjalmar J. Procopé (Warsaw)	1927–1928	Envoy
Gustaf Idman (Warsaw)	1928–1938	Envoy
Bruno Kivikoski (Warsaw)	1938–1939	Envoy
Ensio Hiitonen	1939	Chargé d'Affaires
Bruno Kivikoski	1939–1941	Envoy
Eduard Palin	1941–1945	Envoy
Cay Sundström (Moscow)	1949–1953	Envoy
Åke Gartz (Moscow)	1953–1955	Envoy
Eero A. Wuori (Moscow)	1955–1956	Envoy
Gunnar Palmroth (Warsaw)	1956–1958	Envoy
Jorma Vanamo (Warsaw)	1958–1960	Envoy
Matti Pyykkö	1960–1962	Chargé d'Affaires
Vesa Hiekkanen	1962–1963	Chargé d'Affaires
Martti Salomies	1963	Chargé d'Affaires
Martti Salomies	1963–1966	Ambassador
Björn-Olof Alholm	1966–1968	Ambassador
Kaarlo Mäkelä	1968–1972	Ambassador
Pentti Suomela	1972–1976	Ambassador
Matti Häkkänen	1976–1980	Ambassador
Olli Bergman	1980–1983	Ambassador
Jussi Montonen	1984–1986	Ambassador
Osmo Kock	1987–1990	Ambassador
Bo Ådahl	1990–1992	Ambassador
Timo Koponen	1992–1996	Ambassador
Mikko Heikinheimo	1996–2000	Ambassador
Pekka Harttila	2000–2004	Ambassador
Tapio Saarela	2004–2008	Ambassador
Irmeli Mustonen	2008–2011	Ambassador
Ulla Väistö	2011–2015	Ambassador
Päivi Pohjanheimo	2015–2019	Ambassador
Marjut Akola	2019–2023	Ambassador

=== Dublin (Ireland) ===
Representative	Years	Status
Alexander Thesleff (Brussels)	1961–1963	Envoy
Olavi Murto (Brussels)	1963–1964	Envoy
Sigurd von Numers (The Hague)	1964–1965	Envoy
Sigurd von Numers (The Hague)	1965–1970	Ambassador
Paul Gustafsson (The Hague)	1970–1973	Ambassador
Henrik Blomstedt (The Hague)	1973–1978	Ambassador
Ensio Helaniemi (The Hague)	1978–1983	Ambassador
Matti Häkkänen (The Hague)	1983–1987	Ambassador
Osmo Lares (The Hague, from 1989 Dublin)	1987–1991	Ambassador
Ulf-Erik Slotte	1991–1996	Ambassador
Timo Jalkanen	1996–2001	Ambassador
Pekka Oinonen	2001–2005	Ambassador
Seppo Kauppila	2005–2009	Ambassador
Pertti Majanen	2009–2013	Ambassador
Hilkka Nenonen	2013–2015	Ambassador
Jaana Teckenberg	2016-Incumbent	Ambassador

=== The Hague (Netherlands) ===
Representative	Years	Status
Erik Ehrström	1919	ReRepresentative
Yrjö Saastamoinen	1919–1920	ReRepresentative
Yrjö Saastamoinen	1920–1921	Chargé d'Affaires
G. A. Gripenberg	1921–1923	Chargé d'Affaires
Yrjö Saastamoinen	1923–1924	Chargé d'Affaires
Yrjö Saastamoinen	1924–1925	Chargé d'Affaires
Armas Saastamoinen (London)	1926–1932	Envoy
Harald Hellström	1932	Chargé d'Affaires
Wäinö Wuolijoki (Oslo)	1933–1938	Envoy
Leonard Åström (Brussels)	1938–1939	Envoy
Hugo Valvanne (Brussels)	1939–1940	Envoy
Paavo Pajula (Copenhagen)	1940	Envoy
Asko Ivalo	1947–1951	Envoy
Aarno Yrjö-Koskinen	1951	Envoy
Aarne Wuorimaa	1951–1957	Envoy
Aarne Wuorimaa	1957–1959	Ambassador
Helge von Knorring	1969–1964	Ambassador
Sigurd von Numers	1964–1970	Ambassador
Paul Gustafsson	1970–1973	Ambassador
Henrik Blomstedt	1973–1978	Ambassador
Ensio Helaniemi	1978–1983	Ambassador
Matti Häkkänen	1983–1987	Ambassador
Osmo Lares	1987–1989	Ambassador
Joel Pekuri	1989–1991	Ambassador
Erkki Mäentakanen	1991–1997	Ambassador
Pertti Harvola	1998–2001	Ambassador
Pekka Säilä	2001–2005	Ambassador
Mikko Jokela	2005–2009	Ambassador
Klaus Korhonen	2009–2013	Ambassador
Liisa Talonpoika	2013–2015	Ambassador
Katri Viinikka	2015–2018	Ambassador
Päivi Kaukoranta	2018-Incumbent	Ambassador

=== Kyiv (Ukraine) ===
Representative	Years	Status
Herman Gummerus	1918–1919	Chargé d'Affaires
Boris Gyllenbögel	1920	ReRepresentative
Erik Ulfstedt	1992–1995	Ambassador
Martti Isoaro	1996–2000	Ambassador
Timo Repo	2001–2003	Ambassador
Laura Reinilä	2003–2007	Ambassador
Christer Michelsson	2007–2011	Ambassador
Arja Makkonen	2011–2015	Ambassador
Juha Virtanen	2015– Incumbent	Ambassador

=== Copenhagen (Denmark) ===
Representative	Years	Status
Armas Saastamoinen	1918	Chargé d'Affaires
Armas Saastamoinen	1918–1919	Envoy
Werner Cajanus	1919	Chargé d'Affaires
Gustaf Idman	1919–1927	Envoy
E. N. Setälä	1927–1930	Envoy
Onni Talas	1930–1934	Envoy
Rolf Thesleff	1934–1938	Envoy
Paavo Pajula	1939–1945	Envoy
Paavo Hynninen	1946–1953	Envoy
Päivö Tarjanne	1953–1954	Envoy
Päivö Tarjanne	1954–1956	Ambassador
T. O. Vahervuori	1956–1957	Ambassador
Armas Yöntilä	1957–1959	Ambassador
Olli Kaila	1959–1961	Ambassador
Päivö Tarjanne	1961–1970	Ambassador
Jaakko Hallama	1970–1974	Ambassador
Veli Helenius	1974–1977	Ambassador
Yrjö Väänänen	1977–1985	Ambassador
Eva-Christina Mäkeläinen	1985–1990	Ambassador
Johannes Bäckström	1990–1995	Ambassador
Ralf Friberg	1995–2001	Ambassador
Pekka Ojanen	2001–2005	Ambassador
Eero Salovaara	2005–2009	Ambassador
Maarit Jalava	2009–2013	Ambassador
Ann-Marie Nyroos	2013–2017	Ambassador
Vesa Vasara	2017-Incumbent	Ambassador

=== Lisbon (Portugal) ===
Representative	Years	Status
Onni Talas (Madrid)	1920–1921	ReRepresentative
Yrjö Saastamoinen (Madrid)	1921–1923	Chargé d'Affaires
G. A. Gripenberg (Madrid)	1923–1929	Chargé d'Affaires
Niilo Orasmaa (Madrid)	1929–1933	Chargé d'Affaires
George Winckelmann (Madrid)	1933–1945	Chargé d'Affaires
George Winckelmann (Madrid)	1933–1934	Chargé d'Affaires
George Winckelmann (Madrid)	1940–1945	Envoy
Aarno Yrjö-Koskinen (The Hague)	1951	Envoy
Aarne Wuorimaa (The Hague)	1951–1959	Envoy
Helge von Knorring (The Hague)	1959–1964	Envoy
Olavi Munkki (Bern)	1964–1965	Envoy
Ragnar Smedslund (Bern)	1965–1967	Ambassador
Björn-Olof Alholm (Bern)	1968–1970	Ambassador
Martti Salomies (Bern)	1970–1974	Ambassador
Kaarlo Mäkelä (Bern)	1974–1976	Ambassador
Joel Toivola (Bern)	1977–1979	Ambassador
Pekka J. Korvenheimo	1975–1978	Chargé d'Affaires
Pentti Talvitie	1979–1984	Ambassador
Lars Lindeman	1984–1985	Ambassador
Pekka Malinen	1985–1988	Ambassador
Olli Auero	1988–1991	Ambassador
Dieter Vitzthum von Eckstädt	1991–1997	Ambassador
Matti Häkkänen	1997–2001	Ambassador
Esko Kiuru	2001–2005	Ambassador
Sauli Feodorow	2005–2009	Ambassador
Asko Numminen	2009–2013	Ambassador
Outi Holopainen	2013–2016	Ambassador
Tarja Laitiainen	2016-Incumbent	Ambassador

=== Ljubljana (Slovenia) ===
Representative	Years	Status
Alec Aalto (Vienna)	1992–1995	Ambassador
Eva-Christina Mäkeläinen (Vienna)	1995–1998	Ambassador
Tom Grönberg (Vienna)	1998–2004	Ambassador
Birgitta Stenius-Mladenov	2004–2009	Ambassador
Laura Kakko	2009–2011	Ambassador
Pekka Metso	2011–2012	Ambassador
Pasi Tuominen (Budapest)	2012–2015	Ambassador
Petri Tuomi-Nikula (Budapest)	2016-Incumbent	Ambassador

- Ljubljana Embassy was closed in 2015.

=== London (United Kingdom) ===
Representative	Years	Status
Rudolf Holsti	1918–1919	ReRepresentative
Ossian Donner	1919	ReRepresentative
Ossian Donner	1919	Chargé d'affaires
Ossian Donner	1919–1926	Envoy
Armas Saastamoinen	1926–1932	Envoy
G. A. Gripenberg	1933–1942	Envoy
Eero A. Wuori	1945–1947	ReRepresentative
Eero A. Wuori	1947–1952	Envoy
Ernst Ossian Soravuo	1952–1955	Envoy
Sakari Tuomioja	1955–1957	Ambassador
Leo Tuominen	1957–1968	Ambassador
Otso Wartiovaara	1968–1974	Ambassador
Richard Tötterman	1975–1983	Ambassador
Ilkka Pastinen	1983–1991	Ambassador
Leif Blomqvist	1991–1997	Ambassador
Pertti Salolainen	1996–2004	Ambassador
Jaakko Laajava	2005–2010	Ambassador
Pekka Huhtaniemi	2010–2015	Ambassador
Päivi Luostarinen	2015–2019	Ambassador
Markku Tapio Keinänen	2019-incumbent	Ambassador

=== Luxembourg ===
Representative	Years	Status
G. A. Gripenberg (The Hague)	1921–1923	Chargé d'Affaires
Yrjö Saastamoinen (The Hague)	1923–1924	Chargé d'Affaires
Yrjö Saastamoinen (The Hague)	1924–1925	Chargé d'Affaires
Carl Enckell (Paris)	1926–1927	Envoy
Harri Holma (Paris)	1927–1940	Envoy
Ragnar Numelin	1947–1950	Envoy
Olavi Voionmaa (Brussels)	1950–1957	Envoy
Lauri Hjelt (Brussels)	1957–1959	Envoy
Alexander Thesleff (Brussels)	1959–1963	Envoy
Olavi Murto (Brussels)	1963–1964	Envoy
Reino Honkaranta (Brussels)	1967–1970	Ambassador
Aarni Talvitie (Brussels)	1970–1975	Ambassador
Åke Wihtol (Brussels)	1975–1981	Ambassador
Paavo Kaarlehto (Brussels)	1981–1985	Ambassador
Aarni Talvitie (Brussels)	1985–1991	Ambassador
Olli Mennander (Brussels)	1991–1995	Ambassador
Johannes Bäckström	1995–1998	Ambassador
Henry Söderholm	1998–2001	Ambassador
Sauli Feodorow	2001–2005	Ambassador
Tarja Laitiainen	2005–2009	Ambassador
Marja Lehto	2009–2015	Ambassador
Timo Ranta (Brussels)	2015–2018	Ambassador
Riitta Resch (Brussels)	2018–2022	Ambassador
Jouko Leinonen (Brussels)	2022–Incumbent	Ambassador

- Luxembourg Embassy was closed in 2015.

=== Madrid (Spain) ===
Representative	Years	Status
Lorenzo Kihlman	1918–1919	Chargé d'Affaires
Onni Talas	1919–1921	Chargé d'Affaires
Herman Saastamoinen	1921–1923	Chargé d'Affaires
G. A. Gripenberg	1923–1929	Chargé d'Affaires
Yrjö Orasmaa	1929–1933	Chargé d'Affaires
George Winckelmann	1933–1934	Chargé d'Affaires
George Winckelmann	1934–1940	Chargé d'Affaires
George Winckelmann	1940–1945	Envoy
Karl Brotherus	1955–1957	Chargé d'Affaires
Tapio Voionmaa	1957–1960	Ambassador
Lauri Hjelt	1961–1966	Ambassador
Aaro Pakaslahti	1966–1969	Ambassador
Jussi Montonen	1969–1972	Ambassador
Heikki Hannikainen	1972–1978	Ambassador
Joel Pekuri	1978–1984	Ambassador
Carolus Lassila	1984–1987	Ambassador
Heikki Kalha	1988–1990	Ambassador
Eeva-Kristiina Forsman	1990–1996	Ambassador
Pekka J. Korvenheimo	1996–2001	Ambassador
Charles Murto	2001–2005	Ambassador
Maija Lähteenmäki	2005–2009	Ambassador
Markku Keinänen	2009–2013	Ambassador
Roberto Tanzi-Albi	2013–2017	Ambassador
Tiina Jortikka-Laitinen	2017-Incumbent	Ambassador

=== Moscow ===
==== Soviet Union ====
Representative	Years	Status
Anders Ahonen	1921	ReRepresentative
Eero Järnefelt	1921	Chargé d'Affaires
Karl Gyllenbögel	1921–1922	Chargé d'Affaires
Eero Järnefelt	1922–1923	Chargé d'Affaires
Antti Hackzell	1922–1927	Envoy
Pontus Artti	1927–1930	Envoy
Aarno Yrjö-Koskinen	1931–1939	Envoy
Juho Kusti Paasikivi	1940–1941	Envoy
Cay Sundström	1945–1953	Envoy
Åke Gartz	1953–1954	Envoy
Åke Gartz	1954–1955	Ambassador
Eero A. Wuori	1955–1963	Ambassador
Jorma Vanamo	1963–1967	Ambassador
Jaakko Hallama	1967–1970	Ambassador
Björn-Olof Alholm	1970–1974	Ambassador
Jaakko Hallama	1974–1982	Ambassador
Aarno Karhilo	1983–1988	Ambassador
Heikki Talvitie	1988–1992	Ambassador

==== Russia ====
Representative	Years	Status
Heikki Talvitie	1991–1992	Ambassador
Arto Mansala	1993–1996	Ambassador
Markus Lyra	1996–2000	Ambassador
René Nyberg	2000–2004	Ambassador
Harry Helenius	2004–2008	Ambassador
Matti Anttonen	2008–2012	Ambassador
Hannu Himanen	2012–2016	Ambassador
Mikko Hautala	2016–2020	Ambassador

=== Nicosia (Cyprus) ===
Representative	Years	Status
T. O. Vahervuori (Rome)	1961–1964	Envoy
T. O. Vahervuori (Rome)	1964–1968	Ambassador
Leo Tuominen (Rome)	1968–1969	Ambassador
Jorma Vanamo (Rome)	1970–1975	Ambassador
Matti Kahiluoto (Tel Aviv)	1975–1981	Ambassador
Paaso Helminen (Tel Aviv)	1981–1982	Ambassador
Erkki Mäentakanen (Tel Aviv)	1982–1984	Ambassador
Taneli Kekkonen (Tel Aviv)	1984–1985	Ambassador
Osmo Väinölä (Tel Aviv)	1985–1989	Ambassador
Pekka J. Korvenheimo (Tel Aviv)	1989–1993	Ambassador
Arto Tanner (Tel Aviv)	1993–1997	Ambassador
Pasi Patokallio (Tel Aviv)	1997–2003	Ambassador
Kari Veijalainen (Tel Aviv)	2003–2004	Ambassador
Risto Piipponen	2004–2008	Ambassador
Riitta Resch	2008–2012	Ambassador
Anu Saarela	2012–2016	Ambassador
Timo Heino	2016–Incumbent	Ambassador

=== Oslo (Norway) ===
Representative	Years	Status
Allan Serlachius	1918–1919	Envoy
Rolf Thesleff	1919–1925	Envoy
Östen Elfving	1926–1930	Envoy
Wäinö Wuolijoki	1933–1940	Envoy
Päivö Tarjanne	1945–1950	Envoy
Eduard Palin	1950–1954	Envoy
Eduard Palin	1954–1958	Ambassador
Tyyne Leivo-Larsson	1958–1966	Ambassador
Pentti Suomela	1966–1972	Ambassador
Reino Honkaranta	1972	Ambassador
Olavi Munkki	1973–1976	Ambassador
Lars Lindeman	1976–1984	Ambassador
Henrik Blomstedt	1984–1988	Ambassador
Kaarlo Yrjö-Koskinen	1988–1993	Ambassador
Jorma Inki	1993–1999	Ambassador
Ole Norrback	1999–2003	Ambassador
Pekka Huhtaniemi	2003–2005	Ambassador
Peter Stenlund	2006–2010	Ambassador
Maimo Henriksson	2010–2014	Ambassador
Erik Lundberg	2014–2018	Ambassador
Mikael Antell	2018-Incumbent	Ambassador

=== Paris (France) ===
Representative	Years	Status
Lorenzo Kihlman	1918	Chargé d'Affaires
Erik Ehrström	1918–1919	Representative
Carl Enckell	1919–1927	Envoy
Harri Holma	1927–1943	Envoy
Johan Helo	1945–1954	Envoy
Johan Helo	1954–1956	Ambassador
Richard Seppälä	1956–1958	Ambassador
Gunnar Palmroth	1958–1965	Ambassador
Richard Seppälä	1965–1972	Ambassador
Ralph Enckell	1972–1976	Ambassador
Aarno Karhilo	1977–1982	Ambassador
Ossi Sunell	1983–1986	Ambassador
Seppo Pietinen	1986–1988	Ambassador
Matti Häkkänen	1988–1993	Ambassador
Klaus Törnudd	1993–1996	Ambassador
Antti Hynninen	1997–2001	Ambassador
Esko Hamilo	2001–2005	Ambassador
Charles Murto	2005–2008	Ambassador
Pilvi-Sisko Vierros Villeneuve	2009–2013	Ambassador
Risto Piipponen	2013–2018	Ambassador
Teemu Tanner	2018-Incumbent	Ambassador

=== Prague ===
==== Czechoslovakia ====
Representative	Years	Status
Gustaf Idman (Riga, from 1928 Warsaw)	1927–1935	Envoy
Armas Yöntilä	1935–1938	Chargé d'Affaires
Ensio Hiitonen	1938–1939	Chargé d'Affaires
Eduard Palin	1947–1950	Envoy
Ragnar Numelin	1950–1953	Envoy
Urho Toivola	1953–1957	Envoy
Jaakko Ahokas	1957–1959	Envoy
Jaakko Ahokas	1959–1962	Ambassador
Atle Asanti	1962–1972	Ambassador
Joel Toivola	1972–1976	Ambassador
Olli Auero	1976–1980	Ambassador
Antti Karppinen	1980–1985	Ambassador
Eero Yrjölä	1985–1990	Ambassador
Pauli Opas	1990–1992	Ambassador

==== Czech Republic ====
Representative	Years	Status
Pauli Opas	1993–1994	Ambassador
Esko Rajakoski	1994–1999	Ambassador
Risto Rännäli	1999–2003	Ambassador
Jorma Inki	2003–2007	Ambassador
Hannu Kyröläinen	2007–2010	Ambassador
Päivi Hiltunen-Toivio	2010–2014	Ambassador
Helena Tuuri	2014–2018	Ambassador
Jukka Pesola	2018-Incumbent	Ambassador

=== Reykjavik (Iceland) ===
Representative	Years	Status
Päivö Tarjanne (Oslo)	1947–1950	Envoy
Eduard Palin (Oslo)	1950–1958	Envoy
Tyyne Leivo-Larsson (Oslo)	1958–1964	Envoy
Tyyne Leivo-Larsson (Oslo)	1964–1965	Ambassador
Pentti Suomela (Oslo)	1966–1972	Ambassador
Olavi Munkki (Oslo)	1973–1976	Ambassador
Lars Lindeman	1976–1982	Ambassador
Martin Isaksson	1982–1985	Ambassador
Anders Huldén	1985–1989	Ambassador
Håkan Branders	1989–1993	Ambassador
Tom Söderman	1993–2000	Ambassador
Timo Koponen	2000–2004	Ambassador
Kai Granholm	2004–2008	Ambassador
Hannu Hämäläinen	2008–2010	Ambassador
Ari Tasanen	2010–2011	Chargé d'Affaires
Irma Ertman	2011–2014	Ambassador
Valtteri Hirvonen	2014–2018	Ambassador
Ann-Sofie Stude	2018-Incumbent	Ambassador

=== Riga (Latvia) ===
Representative	Years	Status
Reino Sylvander	1920–1921	ReRepresentative
Erkki Reijonen (Tallinn)	1922–1923	Envoy
Rudolf Holsti (Tallinn)	1923–1926	Envoy
Reino Sylvander	1926–1927)	Envoy
Gustaf Idman	1927–1928	Envoy
Paavo Hynninen	1928–1933	Envoy
Eduard Palin	1933–1940	Envoy
Antti Lassila	1991–1995	Ambassador
Hannu Hämäläinen	1995–2000	Ambassador
Kirsti Eskelinen	2000–2004	Ambassador
Pekka Wuoristo	2004–2008	Ambassador
Maria Serenius	2008–2012	Ambassador
Pirkko Hämäläinen	2012–2014	Ambassador
Olli Kantanen	2014–2018	Ambassador
Riitta Korpivaara	2018-Incumbent	Ambassador

=== Rome (Italy) ===
Representative	Years	Status
Herman Gummerus	1919	Chargé d'Affaires
Herman Gummerus	1920–1925	Envoy
Rolf Thesleff	1925–1930	Envoy
Pontus Artti	1931–1936	Envoy
Rafael Erich	1936–1938	Envoy
Eero Järnefelt	1938–1940	Envoy
Onni Talas	1940–1944	Envoy
Harri Holma	1947–1953	Envoy
Asko Ivalo	1954	Envoy
Asko Ivalo	1954–1961	Ambassador
T. O. Vahervuori	1961–1968	Ambassador
Leo Tuominen	1968–1969	Ambassador
Jorma Vanamo	1970–1975	Ambassador
Taneli Kekkonen	1975–1980	Ambassador
Paul Jyrkänkallio	1980–1985	Ambassador
Eeva-Kristiina Forsman	1985–1990	Ambassador
Ossi Sunell	1990–1993	Ambassador
Matti Häkkänen	1993–1997	Ambassador
Dieter Vitzthum	1997–2003	Ambassador
Alec Aalto	2003–2006	Ambassador
Pauli Mäkelä	2006–2010	Ambassador
Petri Tuomi-Nikula	2010–2015	Ambassador
Janne Taalas	2015–Incumbent	Ambassador

=== Sofia (Bulgaria) ===
Representative	Years	Status
Väinö Tanner	1920–1921	Chargé d'Affaires
Väinö Tanner	1921–1923	Envoy
Pontus Artti (Rome)	1932–1934	Envoy
Onni Talas (Budapest)	1934–1940	Envoy
Aarne Wuorimaa (Budapest)	1940–1944	Envoy
Ville Niskanen (Belgrade)	1948–1950	Envoy
Cay Sundström (Moscow)	1950–1953	Envoy
Åke Gartz (Moscow)	1953–1955	Envoy
Eero A. Wuori (Moscow)	1955–1956	Envoy
Gunnar Palmroth (Warsaw)	1956–1958	Envoy
Jorma Vanamo (Warsaw)	1958–1963	Envoy
Martti Ingman (Warsaw)	1963–1964	Envoy
Wilhelm Schreck	1964–1968	Ambassador
Paul Jyrkänkallio	1969–1972	Ambassador
Soini Palasto	1972–1979	Ambassador
Esko Vaartela	1979–1983	Ambassador
Åke Backström	1983–1986	Ambassador
Klaus Snellman	1986–1989	Ambassador
Pekka Oinonen	1990–1992	Ambassador
Mauno Castrén	1992–1994	Ambassador
Tapio Saarela	1995–2000	Ambassador
Taisto Tolvanen	2000–2005	Ambassador
Kauko Jämsén	2005–2009	Ambassador
Tarja Laitiainen	2009–2012	Ambassador
Harri Salmi	2012–Incumbent	Ambassador

=== Tallinn (Estonia) ===
Representative	Years	Status
Erkki Reijonen	1919–1920	ReRepresentative
Erkki Reijonen	1920–1921	Chargé d'Affaires
Erkki Reijonen	1921–1923	Envoy
Rudolf Holsti	1923–1927	Envoy
Aarne Wuorimaa	1928–1933	Envoy
Paavo Hynninen	1933–1940	Envoy
Jaakko Kaurinkoski	1991–1996	Ambassador
Pekka Oinonen	1996–2001	Ambassador
Jaakko Blomberg	2001–2005	Ambassador
Jaakko Kalela	2005–2010	Ambassador
Aleksi Härkönen	2010–2014	Ambassador
Kirsti Narinen	2014–2018	Ambassador
Timo Kantola	2018-Incumbent	Ambassador

=== Stockholm (Sweden) ===
Representative	Years	Status
Alexis Gripenberg	1918	Chargé d'Affaires
Alexis Gripenberg	1918–1919	Envoy
Werner Söderhjelm	1919–1928	Envoy
Rafael Erich	1928–1936	Envoy
Juho Kusti Paasikivi	1936–1939	Envoy
Eljas Erkko	1939–1940	Envoy
Jarl Axel Wasastjerna	1940–1943	Envoy
G. A. Gripenberg	1943–1954	Envoy
G. A. Gripenberg	1954–1956	Ambassador
Päivö Tarjanne	1956–1961	Ambassador
Sakari Tuomioja	1961–1964	Ambassador
Eero A. Wuori	1964–1965	Chargé d'Affaires
Ralph Enckell	1965–1969	Ambassador
Leo Tuominen	1969–1972	Ambassador
Max Jakobson	1972–1975	Ambassador
Jorma Vanamo	1975–1980	Ambassador
Paul Gustafsson	1980–1983	Ambassador
Björn-Olof Alholm	1983–1991	Ambassador
Matti Kahiluoto	1991–1996	Ambassador
Heikki Talvitie	1996–2002	Ambassador
Pertti Torstila	2002–2006	Ambassador
Alec Aalto	2006–2010	Ambassador
Markus Lyra	2010–2011	Ambassador
Harry Helenius	2011–2014	Ambassador
Jarmo Viinanen	2014–2016	Ambassador
Matti Anttonen	2017–.2018	Ambassador
Liisa Talonpoika	2018-Incumbent	Ambassador

=== Warsaw (Poland) ===
Representative	Years	Status
Boris Gyllenbögel	1919–1920	Chargé d'Affaires
Boris Gyllenbögel	1920–1921	Envoy
Erik Ehrström	1922–1926	Envoy
Hjalmar J. Procopé	1926–1928	Envoy
Gustaf Idman	1928–1938	Envoy
Bruno Kivikoski (from 1939 Bucharest)	1938–1940	Envoy
Eero Järnefelt	1945–1954	Envoy
Eero Järnefelt	1954–1955	Ambassador
Gunnar Palmroth	1955–1958	Ambassador
Jorma Vanamo	1958–1963	Ambassador
Martti Ingman	1963–1967	Ambassador
Osmo Orkomies	1967–1972	Ambassador
Jussi Montonen	1972–1976	Ambassador
Ralph Enckell	1976–1980	Ambassador
Taneli Kekkonen	1980–1984	Ambassador
Olavi Rautio	1984–1987	Ambassador
Unto Turunen	1988–1991	Ambassador
Jyrki Aimonen	1991–1995	Ambassador
Seppo Kauppila	1995–2000	Ambassador
Hannu Hämäläinen	2000–2004	Ambassador
Jan Store	2004–2008	Ambassador
Vesa Himanen	2008–2012	Ambassador
Jari Vilén	2012–2014	Ambassador
Hanna Lehtinen	2014–2018	Ambassador
Juha Ottman	2018-Incumbent	Ambassador

=== Holy See ===
Representative	Years	Status
G. A. Gripenberg	1942–1943	Envoy
Harri Holma	1943–1947	Envoy
Göran Stenius	1947–1951	Chargé d'Affaires

- Finland's diplomatic relations to Holy See was Incumbented by the Bern, Madrid, Vienna, Cairo and Warsaw embassies.

=== Vilnius (Lithuania) ===
Representative	Years	Status
Reino Sylvander (Riga)	1920–1921	Representative
Reino Sylvander (Riga)	1921–1926	Chargé d'Affaires
Reino Sylvander (Riga)	1926–1927	Envoy
Gustaf Idman (Riga)	1927–1928	Envoy
Paavo Hynninen (Riga)	1928–1933	Envoy
Eduard Palin (Riga)	1933–1940	Envoy
Taisto Tolvanen	1992–1996	Ambassador
Rauno Viemerö	1996–2000	Ambassador
Taina Kiekko	2000–2004	Ambassador
Timo Lahelma	2004–2008	Ambassador
Marja-Liisa Kiljunen	2008–2012	Ambassador
Harri Mäki-Reinikka	2013–2016	Ambassador
Christer Michelsson	2016–2020	Ambassador
Arja Makkonen	2020-2024	
Jaakko Lehtovirta	since 2024	

=== Vienna (Austria) ===
Representative	Years	Status
Harri Holma (Berlin)	1921–1927	Envoy
Wäinö Wuolijoki (Berlin)	1927–1933	Envoy
Onni Talas (Copenhagen/Budapest)	1933–1938	Envoy
Eduard Palin (Prague)	1949–1950	Envoy
Ragnar Numelin (Prague)	1950–1953	Envoy
Urho Toivola (Prague)	1953–1957	Envoy
C. O. Frietsch	1957–1961	Chargé d'Affaires
Otso Wartiovaara	1961–1968	Ambassador
Jussi Mäkinen	1968–1976	Ambassador
Seppo Pietinen	1976–1980	Ambassador
Björn-Olof Alholm	1980–1983	Ambassador
Kaarlo Yrjö-Koskinen	1983–1988	Ambassador
Matti Kahiluoto	1988–1991	Ambassador
Alec Aalto	1991–1995	Ambassador
Eva-Christina Mäkeläinen	1995–1998	Ambassador
Tom Grönberg	1998–2005	Ambassador
Kirsti Kauppi	2005–2009	Ambassador
Marjatta Rasi	2009–2013	Ambassador
Anu Laamanen	2013–2016	Ambassador
Hannu Kyröläinen	2016–2019	Ambassador
Pirkko Hämäläinen	2019-Incumbent	Ambassador

=== Zagreb (Croatia) ===
Representative	Years	Status
Pertti Torstila	1992–1996	Ambassador
Elisabeth Tigerstedt-Tähtelä	1997–1998	Ambassador
Osmo Lipponen	1998–2002	Ambassador
Ilpo Manninen	2002–2007	Ambassador
Ann-Marie Nyroos	2007–2010	Ambassador
Juha Ottman	2010–2013	Ambassador
Timo Rajakangas	2013–Incumbent	Ambassador
Risto Piipponen	2018–Incumbent	Ambassador

== South America ==
=== Buenos Aires (Argentina) ===
Representative	Years	Status
G. A. Gripenberg	1929–1933	Envoy
Eino Wälikangas	1934–1937	Envoy
Niilo Orasmaa	1937–1945	Envoy
Ernst Ossian Soravuo	1947–1952	Envoy
Leo Tuominen	1952–1955	Envoy
Heikki Leppo	1955–1957	Envoy
Heikki Leppo	1957–1961	Ambassador
Soini Palasto	1961–1966	Ambassador
Alexander Amatus Thesleff	1966–1974	Ambassador
Paavo Kaarlehto	1974–1975	Ambassador
Klaus Castrén	1975–1983	Ambassador
Esko Rajakoski	1983–1987	Ambassador
Matti Häkkänen	1987–1988	Ambassador
Pertti Kärkkäinen	1988–1993	Ambassador
Pekka J. Korvenheimo	1993–1996	Ambassador
Erkki Kivimäki	1996–2001	Ambassador
Risto Veltheim	2001–2005	Ambassador
Ritva Jolkkonen	2005–2008	Ambassador
Jukka Pietikäinen	2008–2012	Ambassador
Jukka Siukosaari	2012–2016	Ambassador
Teemu Turunen	2016–2019	Ambassador
Kirsi Vanamo-Santacruz	2019-Incumbent	Ambassador

=== Bogotá (Colombia) ===
Representative	Status	Years
Johan Nykopp (Washington, D.C.)	1954–1958	Envoy
Richard Seppälä (Washington, D.C.)	1958–1962	Envoy
Richard Seppälä (Washington, D.C.)	1962–1964	Ambassador
Heikki Hannikainen (Lima)	1964–1967	Ambassador
Torsten Tikanvaara (Lima)	1967–1976	Ambassador
Klaus Snellman (Lima)	1976–1980	Ambassador
Seppo Pietinen (Lima)	1980–1982	Ambassador
Erkki Pajari	1982–1985	Ambassador
Lasse Oka	1985–1988	Ambassador
Risto Rekola	1989–1992	Ambassador
Jarmo Kuuttila	2017-Incumbent	Ambassador

=== Caracas (Venezuela) ===
Representative	Years	Status
Johan Nykopp (Washington, D.C.)	1954–1958	Envoy
Richard Seppälä (Washington, D.C.)	1958–1964	Envoy
Heikki Hannikainen (Lima)	1964–1967	Ambassador
Torsten Tikanvaara (Lima)	1967–1976	Ambassador
Klaus Snellman (Lima)	1976–1980	Ambassador
Erkki Kivimäki	1980–1985	Ambassador
Pertti Ripatti	1985–1989	Ambassador
Esko Rajakoski	1989–1994	Ambassador
Teppo Takala	1994–1998	Ambassador
Iivo Salmi	1998–2002	Ambassador
Ora Meres-Wuori	2002–2006	Ambassador
Mikko Pyhälä	2006–2011	Ambassador

- Caracasin Embassy was closed in 2011.

=== Brasília (Brazil) ===
Representative	Years	Status
G. A. Gripenberg (Buenos Aires)	1929–1933	Envoy
Eino Wälikangas (Buenos Aires)	1934–1937	Envoy
Eino Wälikangas (Rio de Janeiro)	1937–1945	Envoy
Niilo Orasmaa (Rio de Janeiro)	1946–1950	Envoy
T. O. Vahervuori (Rio de Janeiro)	1950–1956	Envoy
Martti Ingman (Rio de Janeiro)	1956–1958	Envoy
Martti Ingman (Rio de Janeiro, from 1960 Brasília)	1958–1963	Ambassador
Toivo Heikkilä	1963–1964	Ambassador
Heikki Leppo	1964–1974	Ambassador
Åke Frey	1974–1975	Ambassador
Martti Lintulahti	1975–1982	Ambassador
Pekka J. Korvenheimo	1982–1987	Ambassador
Risto Kauppi	1987–1991	Ambassador
Juhani Muhonen	1991–1993	Ambassador
Pertti Harvola	1993–1997	Ambassador
Asko Numminen	1998–2002	Ambassador
Hannu Uusi-Videnoja	2002–2007	Ambassador
Ilpo Manninen	2007–2010	Ambassador
Jari Luoto	2010–2014	Ambassador
Markku Virri	2014–2018	Ambassador
Jouko Leinonen	2018-Incumbent	Ambassador

=== Lima (Peru) ===
Representative	Years	Status
Heikki Hannikainen	1964–1967	Ambassador
Torsten Tikanvaara	1967–1976	Ambassador
Klaus Snellman	1976–1980	Ambassador
Seppo Pietinen	1980–1983	Ambassador
Riitta Örö	1983–1986	Ambassador
Esko Lipponen	1986–1991	Ambassador
Pertti A. O. Kärkkäinen (Buenos Aires)	1991–1993	Ambassador
Pekka J. Korvenheimo (Buenos Aires)	1993	Ambassador
Maija Lähteenmäki (Santiago de Chile)	1993–1995	Ambassador
Risto Kauppi (Santiago de Chile)	1995–1998	Ambassador
Mikko Pyhälä	1998–2002	Ambassador
Kimmo Pulkkinen	2002–2007	Ambassador
Pekka Orpana	2007–2011	Ambassador
Juha Virtanen	2011–2015	Ambassador
Mika Koskinen	2015–2019	Ambassador
Jukka Pietikäinen	Incumbent	Ambassador

=== Santiago (Chile) ===
Representative	Years	Status
G. A. Gripenberg (Buenos Aires)	1931–1933	Envoy
Eino Wälikangas (Buenos Aires)	1934–1937	Envoy
Niilo Orasmaa (Buenos Aires)	1937–1945	Envoy
Ernst Ossian Soravuo (Buenos Aires)	1948–1952	Envoy
Leo Tuominen (Buenos Aires)	1952–1955	Envoy
Heikki Leppo (Buenos Aires)	1955–1961	Envoy
Soini Palasto (Buenos Aires)	1961–1965	Envoy
Soini Palasto (Buenos Aires)	1965–1966	Ambassador
Alexander Thesleff (Buenos Aires)	1966–1974	Ambassador
Paavo Kaarlehto (Buenos Aires)	1974–1975	Ambassador
Klaus Castrén (Buenos Aires)	1976–1983	Ambassador
Esko Rajakoski (Buenos Aires)	1983–1987	Ambassador
Matti Häkkänen (Buenos Aires)	1987–1988	Ambassador
Pertti Kärkkäinen (Buenos Aires)	1988–1991	Ambassador
Maija Lähteenmäki	1991–1995	Ambassador
Risto Kauppi	1995–2000	Ambassador
Veijo Sampovaara	2000–2003	Ambassador
Pekka J. Korvenheimo	2003–2006	Ambassador
Iivo Salmi	2006–2010	Ambassador
Ilkka Heiskanen	2010–2015	Ambassador
Mika-Markus Leinonen	2015–2018	Ambassador
Eija Rotinen	2018-Incumbent	Ambassador

== North America ==
=== Ottawa (Canada) ===
Representative	Years	Status
Urho Toivola	1947–1952	Envoy
Hans Martola	1952–1954	Chargé d'Affaires
Sigurd von Numers	1954–1959	Chargé d'Affaires
Artturi Lehtinen	1959–1960	Chargé d'Affaires
Artturi Lehtinen	1960–1963	Ambassador
Torsten Tikanvaara	1964–1967	Ambassador
Reino Palas	1967–1968	Ambassador
Lennart Sumelius	1969–1974	Ambassador
Niilo Pusa	1974–1979	Ambassador
Ossi Sunell	1979–1982	Ambassador
Kurt Uggeldahl	1983–1985	Ambassador
Jaakko Blomberg	1985–1988	Ambassador
Erkki Mäentakanen	1988–1991	Ambassador
Erik Heinrichs	1991–1995	Ambassador
Veijo Sampovaara	1995–2000	Ambassador
Ilkka Ristimäki	2000–2004	Ambassador
Pasi Patokallio	2004–2008	Ambassador
Risto Piipponen	2008–2012	Ambassador
Charles Murto	2012–2016	Ambassador
Vesa Lehtonen	2016–2019	Ambassador
Roy Eriksson	2019–2023	Ambassador
Jari Vilén	2023–2024	Ambassador
Hanna-Leena Korteniemi	2025–Incumbent	Ambassador

=== Washington D.C. (United States) ===
Representative	Years	Status
Armas Saastamoinen	1919–1921	Envoy
Leonard Åström	1921–1934	Envoy
Eero Järnefelt	1934–1938	Envoy
Hjalmar J. Procopé	1939–1944	Envoy
Kalle Jutila	1945–1951	Envoy
Johan Nykopp	1951–1954	Envoy
Johan Nykopp	1954–1958	Ambassador
Richard Seppälä	1958–1965	Ambassador
Olavi Munkki	1965–1972	Ambassador
Leo Tuominen	1972–1977	Ambassador
Jaakko Iloniemi	1977–1983	Ambassador
Richard Müller	1983–1985	Ambassador
Paavo Rantanen	1986–1988	Ambassador
Jukka Valtasaari	1988–1996	Ambassador
Jaakko Laajava	1996–2001	Ambassador
Jukka Valtasaari	2001–2005	Ambassador
Pekka Lintu	2006–2011	Ambassador
Ritva Koukku-Ronde	2011–2015	Ambassador
Kirsti Kauppi	2015–2020	Ambassador
Mikko Hautala	2020–2024	Ambassador
Leena-Kaisa Mikkola	2024–Incumbent	Ambassador

=== Managua (Nicaragua) ===
Representative	Years	Status
Erkki Kivimäki (Caracas)	1980–1985	Ambassador
Veijo Sampovaara (México)	1985–1990	Ambassador
Teppo Takala (México)	1990–1994	Ambassador
Kimmo Pulkkinen (México)	1994–1996	Ambassador
Risto Veltheim (Helsinki)	1996–2001	Roving Ambassador
Inger Hirvelä López (Helsinki)	2001–2006	Roving Ambassador
Marja Luoto	2006–2008	Ambassador
Eija Rotinen	2008–2011	Ambassador
Eeva-Liisa Myllymäki	2011–2013	Chargé d'Affaires

- Managuan Embassy was closed in 2013. The Ambassador is accredited from México

=== México (Mexico) ===
Representative	Years	Status
Kalle Jutila (Washington, D.C.)	1949–1951	Envoy
Johan Nykopp (Washington, D.C.)	1951–1958	Envoy
Richard Seppälä (Washington, D.C.)	1958–1961	Envoy
Richard Seppälä (Washington, D.C.)	1961–1964	Ambassador
Algar von Heiroth	1964–1966	Ambassador
David Somerto	1966–1969	Ambassador
Klaus Castrén	1970–1972	Ambassador
Erik Törnqvist	1973–1978	Ambassador
Jussi Montonen	1978–1984	Ambassador
Aarni Talvitie	1984–1985	Ambassador
Kalevi Sampovaara	1985–1990	Ambassador
Teppo Takala	1990–1994	Ambassador
Kimmo Pulkkinen	1994–1998	Ambassador
Hannu Uusi-Videnoja	1998–2002	Ambassador
Hannu Uusi-Videnoja	1998–2002	Ambassador
Ilkka Heiskanen	2002–2007	Ambassador
Ulla Väistö	2007–2011	Ambassador
Anne Lammila	2011–2015	Ambassador
Roy Eriksson	2015–2019	Ambassador

=== Havana (Cuba) ===
Representative	Years	Status
Leonard Åström (Washington, D.C.)	1929–1934	Envoy
Eero Järnefelt (Washington, D.C.)	1934–1938	Envoy
Hjalmar Procopé (Washington, D.C.)	1939–1944	Envoy
Kalle Jutila (Washington, D.C.)	1948–1951	Envoy
Johan Nykopp (Washington, D.C.)	1951–1958	Envoy
Richard Seppälä (Washington, D.C.)	1958–1964	Envoy
Algar von Heiroth (México)	1964–1966	Envoy
Kai Somerto (México)	1966–1969	Ambassador
Klaus Castrén (México)	1970–1972	Ambassador
Erik Törnqvist (México)	1973–1978	Ambassador
Jussi Montonen (México)	1978–1980	Ambassador
Sakari Juuti	1980–1983	Ambassador
Tero Lehtovaara	1983–1987	Ambassador
Teppo Takala	1987–1990	Ambassador
Heikki Puurunen	1990–1992	Ambassador

- Finland's diplomatic relations to Cuba was Incumbented by the Embassy in México since 1992

== International organisations ==
=== Organization for Security and Co-operation in Europe ===
- Vienna

Representative	Years
Markku Reimaa	1986–1989
Pertti Torstila	1989–1992
René Nyberg	1992–1995
Pekka Ojanen	1995–1998
Pekka Kujasalo	1998–2002
Aleksi Härkönen	2002–2007
Antti Turunen	2007–2010
Timo Kantola	2010–2013
Katja Pehrman	2013–Incumbent

=== United Nations (New York City) ===
Representative	Years
Kai Sauer	2014–Incumbent
Jarmo Viinanen	2009–2014
Kirsti Lintonen	2005–2009
Marjatta Rasi	1998–2005
Wilhelm Breitenstein	1991–1998
Klaus Törnudd	1988–1991
Keijo Korhonen	1983–1988
Ilkka Pastinen	1977–1983
Aarno Karhilo	1972–1977
Max Jakobson	1965–1972
Ralph Enckell	1959–1965
G. A. Gripenberg	1956–1958

==== United Nations and League of Nations (Geneva) ====
Representative	Years
Rafael Erich	1926–1927
Rafael Erich	1927–1940
Leo Tuominen	1950–1952
Olli Vallila	1952–1954
Paavo Pulkkinen	1954–1955)
Torsten Tikanvaara	1955–1959
Kaarlo Mäkelä	1959–1961
Olli Kaila	1961–1962
Reino Honkaranta	1962–1965
Pentti Talvitie	1965–1970
Klaus Sahlgren	1970–1975
Paavo Kaarlehto	1975–1981
Paavo Rantanen	1981–1986
Olli Mennander	1986–1990
Antti Hynninen	1990–1995
Björn Ekblom	1995–1998
Pekka Huhtaniemi	1998–2003
Markku Reimaa	1997–2005
Vesa Himanen	2003–2008
Hannu Himanen	2008–2012
Päivi Kairamo	2012–2016
Terhi Hakala	2016–Incumbent

==== United Nations (Vienna) ====
Representative	Years
C. O. Frietsch	1956–1961
Otso Wartiovaara	1961–1968
Jussi Mäkinen	1968–1976
Seppo Pietinen	1976–1980
Björn-Olof Alholm	1980–1983
Kaarlo Yrjö-Koskinen	1983–1988
Matti Kahiluoto	1988–1991
Alec Aalto	1991–1995
Eva-Christina Mäkeläinen	1995–1998
Tom Grönberg	1998–2005
Kirsti Kauppi	2005–2009
Marjatta Rasi	2009–2013
Anu Laamanen	2013–2016
Hannu Kyröläinen	2016–Incumbent

=== Organisation for Economic Co-operation and Development ===
- Paris

Representative	Years
Richard Seppälä	1968–1969
Ralph Enckell	1969–1976
Paul Gustafsson	1976–1977
Pekka Malinen	1978–1983
Wilhelm Breitenstein	1983–1991
Pasi Rutanen	1991–1997
Ilkka Ristimäki	1997–2000
Jorma Julin	2000–2005
Pertti Majanen	2005–2009
Antti Kuosmanen	2009–2013
Okko-Pekka Salmimies	2013–Incumbent

=== Organisation for the Prohibition of Chemical Weapons ===
- The Hague

Representative	Years
Erkki Mäentakanen	1997–1999
Pertti Harvola	1998–2001
Pekka Säilä	2001–2005
Mikko Jokela	2005–2009
Klaus Korhonen	2009–2013
Liisa Talonpoika	2013–Incumbent

== See also ==
- List of current ambassadors of Finland
