= Montonen =

Surname list

Montonen is a Finnish surname. Notable people with the surname include:

- Anni Montonen (born 2000), Finnish ice hockey player
- Claus Montonen (born 1946), Finnish theoretical physicist
- Jussi Montonen (1924–2015), Finnish diplomat
