= Tanskanen =

Tanskanen is a Finnish surname. Notable people with the surname include:

- Unto Tanskanen (born 1931), Finnish diplomat and lawyer
- Jani Tanskanen (born 1975), Finnish artistic gymnast
- Vilma Tanskanen (born 1995), Finnish ice hockey player
