= Seija Toro =

Finnish diplomat

Seija Toro is a Finnish diplomat and Counsellor for Foreign Affairs. Toro holds a Master of Arts degree. From September 1, 2016, she has been a Roving Ambassador at the Ministry for Foreign Affairs for Mali, Niger, Ivory Coast and Senegal., as well as the Special Representative on Sahel. Before that she was the Ambassador of Finland to Maputo, Mozambique, from 1 November 2013. She started working with the Ministry for Foreign Affairs in 1989.

Ambassador Toro has previously worked with Unicef in Costa Rica and in Cuba as Country Director, as the Nordic and Finnish Government's Board of Directors representative at the Inter-American Development Bank in Washington, and as a Regional Manager at the Ministry for Foreign Affair's Department of Africa and the Middle East as well as in Finland's embassies in Lusaka, Rome and the United Nations Mission in New York.
