= Päivi Hiltunen-Toivio =

Finnish diplomat

Päivi Marjatta Hiltunen-Toivio (born 24 April 1952 in Helsinki) is a Finnish lawyer and diplomat. She served as Ambassador of Finland to Indonesia, based in Jakarta, from 2014 to 2018. She joined the Ministry for Foreign Affairs of Finland in 1979.

Before her posting in Jakarta, Hiltunen-Toivio served as Ambassador of Finland to Prague, the Czech Republic, from 2010 to 2014. Earlier in her diplomatic career, she served as Consul General of Finland in Shanghai and held various positions at the Embassy of Finland in Paris and at Finland’s Permanent Representation to the European Union in Brussels.

In Finland, Hiltunen-Toivio held several EU-related posts, including Deputy Secretary of the EU Presidency Secretariat at the Ministry for Foreign Affairs, Head of the Unit for EU Enlargement in the ministry’s Department for Europe, and Special Adviser for EU Affairs at the Prime Minister’s Office. She also worked in the ministry’s Political Department, Trade Policy Department, Legal Department and Protocol Department.
