= Arja Makkonen =

Finnish diplomat

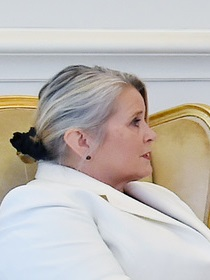
Arja Makkonen (2017).

Arja Makkonen is a Finnish diplomat. She is an ambassador from the Ministry for Foreign Affairs in the Southern Caucasus region of Armenia, Azerbaijan and Georgia. She has previously served as Ambassador to Ukraine in Kyiv since 2011 and has worked since 2015, including in the Moscow and Warsaw Delegations. Prior to that, she has served as Adviser to the Minister of European Affairs and Foreign Trade. Makkonen joined the Ministry for Foreign Affairs in 1989.
