= Anu Laamanen =

Finnish diplomat (born 1958)

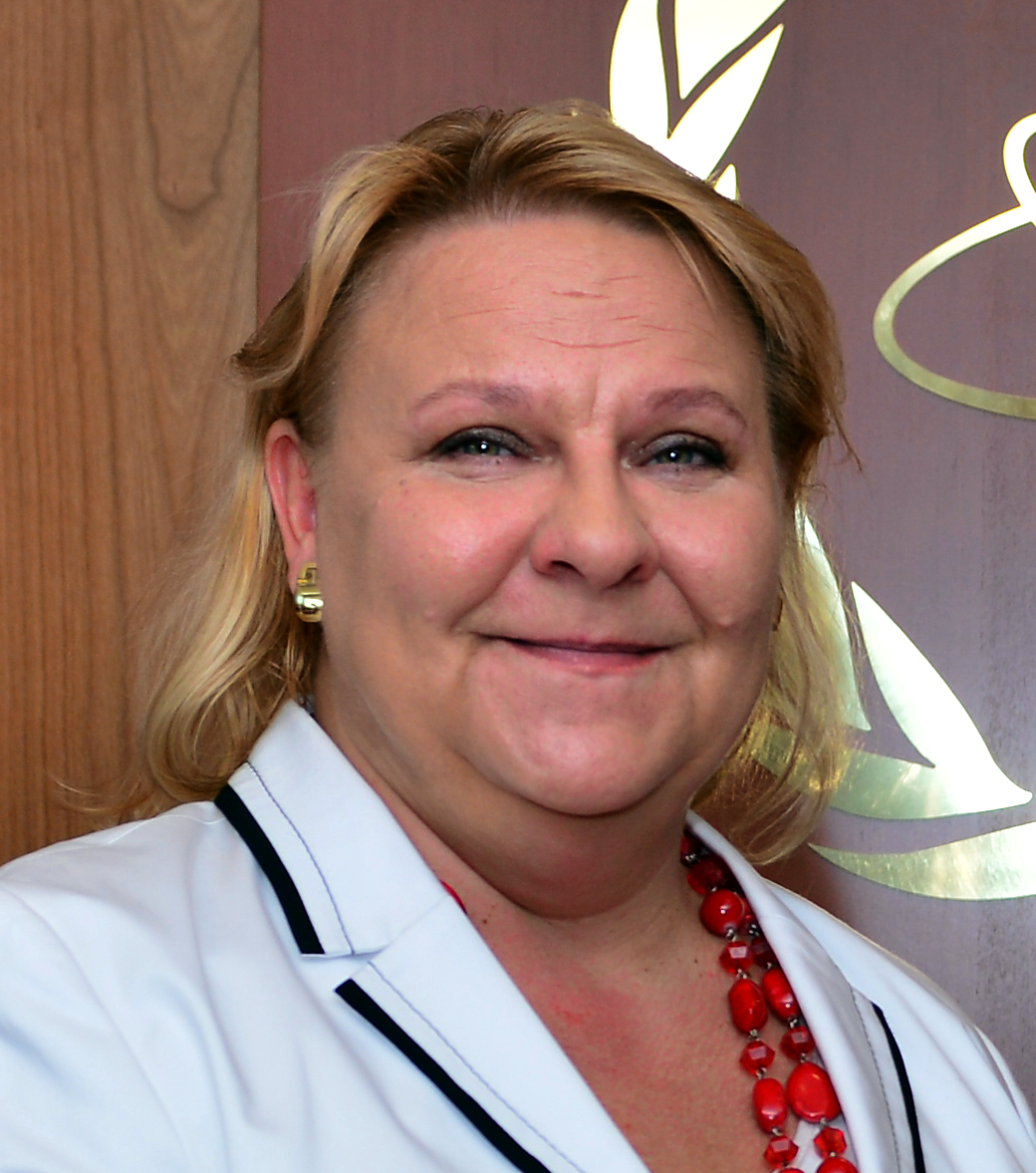
Anu Laamanen (2013)

Anu Irene Laamanen (born 30 October 1958) is a Finnish diplomat. She has been employed by the Ministry for Foreign Affairs since 1986.

Since autumn 2022, Laamanen has been the Finnish Ambassador in Iceland. Before that she was in charge of the National Security Authority of the Ministry of Foreign Affairs (NSA) from 2016 to 2022.

Formerly, she has been Finland's permanent UN representative in Vienna and the Finnish Ambassador in Austria for the period 2013–2016, and the Deputy Head of Department and Head of Unit, of the Political Department of the Ministry for Foreign Affairs. In addition to Vienna, she has worked in embassies in Geneva and Oslo and the Permanent Representations of Finland in the OSCE and the UN.
