= Tero Lehtovaara =

Finnish diplomat and lawyer (1937–2017)

Tero Heikki Mainio Lehtovaara (19 April 1937 – 29 May 2017) was a Finnish diplomat, and law student with a law degree.

Lehtovaara was a Finnish Ambassador to Havana from 1983 to 1987, Deputy Director of the Press and Culture Department from the Ministry for Foreign Affairs from 1988 to 1989 and Ambassador to Kuwait from 1989 to 1992 and to Abu Dhabi from 1989 to 1991 and the Foreign Affairs Counselor since 1992 after he retired.

Lehtovaara was born in Turku, and obtained his undergraduate degree from the Finnish Normal Lyceum in 1955. He graduated as a Bachelor of Law in 1960. Lehtovaara's spouse since 1960 was Marjatta (née Sallinen). His parents were PhD Juuso Mainio Lehtovaara and Pharmacist Helga Soveig (née Allén). He died in Porvoo, aged 80.
