= Raimo Salmi =

Finnish diplomat and ambassador

Raimo Johannes Salmi (born 1936) is a Finnish diplomat and ambassador. He has been Finnish Ambassador to Nairobi from 1980 to 1983 and at the same time in Addis Ababa from 1981 to 1983, in Tripoli, and Cairo from 1983 to 1986.
