= Johannes Bäckström =

Finnish diplomat

Erkki Johannes Bäckström (born. 1939) Is a Finnish diplomat, a Bachelor of Political Science degree. He was Director General of the Protocol Department of the Ministry for Foreign Affairs 1988–1990 and the Ambassador in Copenhagen 1990–1995 and in 1995–1998 in Luxembourg, and later as the Head of Protocol of the Ministry for Foreign Affairs.

During the Finnish EU Presidency in 2006, he was a protocol consultant.
