= Åke Wihtol =

Finnish diplomat

Åke Rudolf Wihtol (24 February 1924 – 2002) was Secretary of State for the Finnish Ministry for Foreign Affairs since 1985 until his retirement in 1991. He made a great career in foreign affairs in both Finland and abroad. From his education, Wihtol was a lawyer and a bachelor.

Wihtol was lawyer as training. He was ambassador in Tokyo from 1968 to 1971, Deputy Head of Department of the Ministry of Foreign Affairs 1971-1972, Head of the Development Cooperation Department 1972-1975, Ambassador in Brussels 1975-1981, Under-Secretary of State (Commercial Policy Issues) 1981-1985 and State Secretary since 1985.
