= Reino Honkaranta =

Finnish diplomat

Reino Ilmari Honkaranta (1921–1972) was a Finnish diplomat. He received a Bachelor of Political Science degree. He served as Permanent Representative of Finland to the UN Office in Europe in Geneva from 1962 to 1965, Head of Department of the Department of Commerce of the Ministry for Foreign Affairs from 1965 to 1967 and Ambassador in Brussels and Luxembourg from 1967 to 1970 and in Norway
