= Jan Groop =

Finnish diplomat (born 1934)

Jan Henrik Groop (born 26 February 1934 Vaasa) is a Finnish diplomat. He is a lawyer in education and has gained the title of Master in Law.

Groop has served as ambassador to Baghdad from 1978 to 1981, as a negotiating officer of the Ministry for Foreign Affairs since 1981, Ambassador to New Delhi and Kathmandu from 1984 to 1988, and Algiers from 1991 to 1995 and Tunis from 1994 to 1995 and Ankara from 1995 to 1997
