= Paul Gustafsson =

Finnish diplomat (1923–2002)

Paul Verner Erkki Gustafsson (9 April 1923 Helsinki – 23 March 2002 Helsinki) was a Finnish diplomat with a law degree. He served as Head of the Legal Department of the Ministry of Foreign Affairs 1967-1970 and 1973-1976 and was Ambassador to The Hague from 1970 to 1973, OECD Representation in Paris 1976–1977, Undersecretary of State from 1977 to 1980 and Ambassador to Stockholm 1980–1983.

He received a diplomatic title of Envoy Extraordinary and Minister Plenipotentiary in 1968.

The parents of Paul Gustafsson were Jaeger Major-General Verner Gustafsson and opera singer Greta von Haartman.
