= Riitta Resch =

Finnish diplomat (born 1954)

Riitta Hannele Resch (née Niemi) (born 2 September 1954) is a Finnish diplomat. She is a leading expert at the Ministry of Foreign Affairs Humanitarian Aid and Policy Unit. Resch worked as an ambassador in Manila from 2004 to 2008. She started working at the Ministry for Foreign Affairs in 1982.

Resch worked as an ambassador in Cyprus, Nicosia from 2008 to 2012, and was the head of the United Nations delegation to Finland. Resch has also served in the Embassies of Paris and New Delhi, as well as at the Geneva Delegation and the UN Representation in New York. In her home-country foreign ministry she has worked as a head of the UN unit in the Legal, Trade and Political Department and before moving to Manila in the Global Affairs Department as Head of the Global Global Unit.
