= Henrik Blomstedt =

Finnish diplomat and lawyer

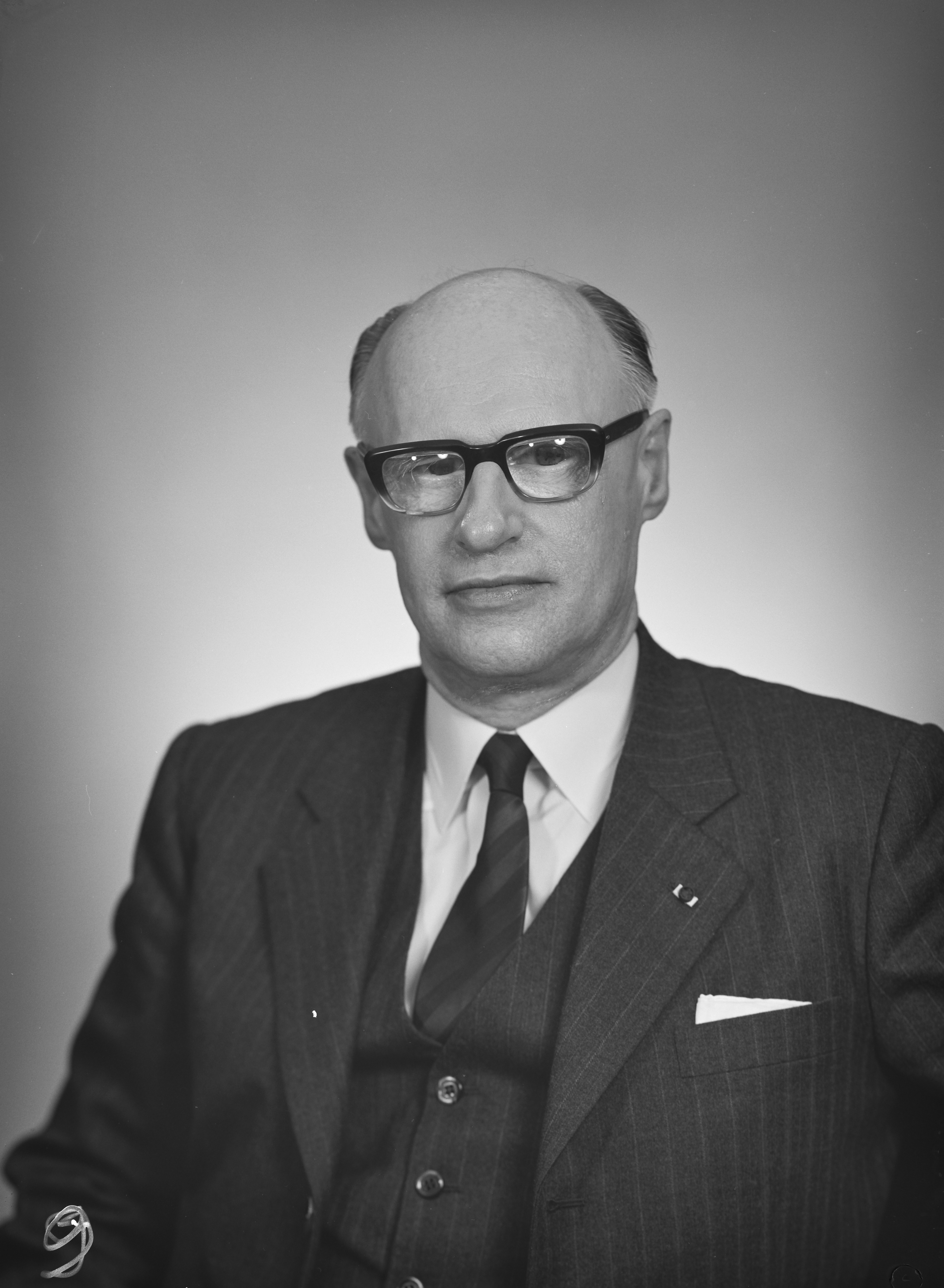
Henrik Blomstedt in 1984.

Henrik Lennart Blomstedt (26 June 1921 – 23 June 2009) was a Finnish diplomat and lawyer.

== Biography ==
Blomstedt was born in Helsinki. He was an ambassador in Addis Ababa, Dar es Salaam, Lusaka and Nairobi between 1965 and 1969, and there was also a representative of Finland at the Organization of African Unity, the Ministry for Foreign Affairs 1969–1970, the Head of the Legal Department from 1970 to 1973, the Ambassador in The Hague from 1973 to 1978, and in Seoul between 1978 and 1984 and in Oslo from 1984 to 1988. He died in Espoo, aged 87.
