= Unto Turunen =

Finnish diplomat

Unto Juhani Turunen (born 1939) is a Finnish diplomat and Master in Law. He has held key positions including: Head of the Foreign Office from 1980 to 1983, Ambassador to Saudi Arabia from 1983 to 1987 (first posted in Jeddah and later in Riyadh), as Ambassador to Poland from 1988 to 1991, as Foreign Affairs Counselor in the Ministry for Foreign Affairs from 1991 to 1993, Head of the Trade Policy Department from 1993 to 1995 and as chief executive officer from 1995 to 1996, as Ambassador to South Korea from 1996 to 2000 and in Malaysia from 2000 to 2004.
