= Ernst Ossian Soravuo =

Finnish diplomat

Ernst Ossian Soravuo, surname until 1926 Sandström (3 December 1904 Viipuri – 2 October 1994 Helsinki) was a Finnish diplomat.

The parents of Soravuo were Agronomist Oskar Ernst Sandström (1867-1926) and Hulda Katarina Hinkula (1870-1945). He graduated in 1924 and studied at the University of Helsinki, graduating as a Bachelor of Philosophy in 1929 and a Master's degree in 1932. Soravuo also studied at the University of Geneva in 1925 and made a study tours to France and Spain from 1927 to 1928.

Soravuo worked for the Foreign Service since 1929. He served as Assistant in the Delegation of Buenos Aires from 1929 to 1931 and in the Embassy of Berlin in 1931-1932 and as Assistant to the Minister of Foreign Affairs from 1932 to 1933. He served as Secretary of State from 1933 to 1935, as Secretary of State in Paris from 1935 to 1939, as Counselor in Stockholm, 1939-1942, as Head of Division for Foreign Affairs in 1942-1944, and as Counselor in Berlin in 1944.

He was representing Finland in the Legal Subcommittee of the International Civil Aviation Organization 1935-1939. Soravuo received the Counselor's title for 1937.

Soravuo was then from the Ministry of Foreign Affairs in 1944-1946 managing the Department of Trade Policy Division and subsequently the Deputy Chief of Staff. He was the Envoy in Buenos Aires from 1947 to 1952, Santiago de Chile (1948-1952), Montevideo from 1949 to 1952, and in London from 1952 to 1955.

Soravuo was married since 1934 with economist Elsa Annikki Walden (1908-1990).
