= Joel Toivola =

Finnish diplomat and engineer

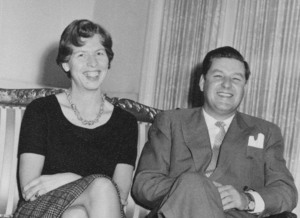
Eli and Joel Toivola

Joel Toivola (15 December 1915 – 21 October 1999) was a Finnish diplomat and engineer.

== Early life ==
Toivola was born in Helsinki. He earned a bachelor's degree in political science.

== Career ==
He was awarded the title of Special Envoy and Plenipotentiary Minister in 1970. He served as Ambassador to Beijing from 1961 to 1967. From 1969-1972 he served in the Ministry for Foreign Affairs administrative department and as Ambassador in Prague 1972-1976 and Bern 1976–1982.

== Personal life ==
He donated his art collection to Varkaus Art Museum lle. Toivolan säätiö jakaa apurahoja Kiina-tutkimukselle.

Joel Toivola's father Urho Toivola was also an Ambassador.
