= Anders Huldén =

Finnish diplomat, journalist and writer

Anders Jacob Huldén (16 July 1924 Jakobstad - 11 December 1997 Helsinki) was a Finnish diplomat, journalist and Swedish-speaking writer.

== Biography ==
Huldén's father was Johan Jakob Huldén, a teacher and writer. Hulde graduated as a Master of Political Science in 1952.

Huldén served as a reporter and secretary of the Åbo Underrättelser magazine from 1948 to 1952. He was the editor-in-chief of the Jakobstads Tidning magazine from 1955 to 1962.

After that, he moved to the Ministry for Foreign Affairs and was a press and culture background first in Stockholm and then in 1968–1973 in Vienna and Bern and in 1973–1974 in Bonn.

Hulden served as Head of the Press and Cultural Affairs Department of the Ministry of Foreign Affairs from 1974 to 1979, then Consul General in Hamburg since 1979 and Ambassador to Iceland 1985–1989.
