= Armas Yöntilä =

Finnish diplomat

Armas Otto Rafael Yöntilä (former. Lindstedt; 26 April 1892, in Helsinki – 1979) was a master of philosophy and a Finnish diplomat. He completed his master's degree in philosophy in 1919 and studied in Jena in 1914, Besacon in 1922 and in The Hague in 1923.

Yesterday, he served as Foreign Secretary in Paris from 1919 to 1921, as second secretary to the Foreign Ministry from 1921 to 1922, as First Secretary 1922–1923, as Secretary of State from 1923 to 1927 and as Division Officer from 1927 to 1928.

He served as Secretary and Counselor in Berlin from 1929 to 1934 and as Chargé d'Affaires and Consul General in Prague from 1934 to 1937. He was then Head of Division of the Ministry of Foreign Affairs of the Ministry of Foreign Affairs from 1938 to 1940 and again as a Diplomatic Officer: first Consul General in Brussels in 1940, then in Hamburg from 1940 to 1942.

He moved as Chargé d'Affaires to Zagreb from 1942 to 1944. In the Foreign Ministry, he was Head of Division 1946–1947, Deputy Director General 1947–1952, then Counselor and Consul General in Pretoria 1952–1957 and Ambassador in Copenhagen 1957–1959. He served as secretary to Inter-Parliamentary Union branch of Finland between 1921 and 1927 and Chairman of the Election Commission in Saarland referendum in 1935.

His daughter was journalist Leila Kalliala.
