= Bo Ådahl =

Finnish diplomat (1932–2000)

Bo Helsing Arvid Ådahl (1932–2000) was a Finnish diplomat. From 1981 to 1985 he was Ambassador to Lagos and from 1990 to 1992 in Bucharest, and from 1985 to 1988, the Consul General of Finland in Gothenburg, and from 1988 to 1990, a negotiating official of the Finnish Ministry of Foreign Affairs. Ådahl was a Master in Political Science.
