= Eva-Christina Mäkeläinen =

Finnish diplomat

Eva-Christina Mäkeläinen (born 1935) is a Finnish diplomat, a Licentiate of Social Sciences degree and a PhD in Philosophy. She served as deputy director of the Department for the Protocol Department of the Ministry of Foreign Affairs from 1976 to 1980. She has been an ambassador in Athens from 1980 to 1985, in Copenhagen 1985-1990 in Vienna and Ljubljana in 1995-1998 .
