= Esko Rajakoski =

Finnish diplomat (1934–2002)

Esko Rajakoski (30 January 1934 – 20 October 2002) was a Finnish diplomat. He served as ambassador of Finland in various countries, including Venezuela and Argentina.

== Biography ==
Rajakoski was born in Helsinki on 30 January 1934. He was a bachelor of political science. In 1975 he was named as the special envoy and a plenipotential minister. He was a negotiating officer from 1980 to 1983, ambassador to Buenos Aires in 1983–1987, Caracas 1989–1994 and Prague 1994–1999. At the beginning of the 2000s he was among the contributors of the Kanava magazine.

Rajakoski died on 20 October 2002.
