= Eero Yrjölä =

Finnish diplomat and lawyer (1925–2010

Eero Olavi Yrjölä (21 June 1925 – 10 September 2010) was a Finnish diplomat and Master in Law. He was Director General of the Department of Administrative Affairs at the Ministry for Foreign Affairs from 1983 to 1985 and Ambassador in Prague from 1985 to 1990. Yrjölä died on 10 September 2010, at the age of 85.
