= Mauri Eggert =

Finnish diplomat (born 1933)

Mauri Mikael Eggert (born April 3, 1933) is a Finnish diplomat and Master of political science.

Eggert was born in Turku. He was Ambassador of Finland to Hanoi from 1977 to 1980, Head of Department for Development Cooperation, 1981–1984, Ambassador to Egypt from 1984 to 1987, Inspector of the Judiciary 1987-1990 and Under-Secretary of State for Development from 1990 to 1993.
