= Veikko Hietanen =

Finnish diplomat (1928–2012)

Veikko Lauri Hietanen (12 March 1928 – 23 November 2012) was a Finnish diplomat, with a degree in Political Science. He was Finnish ambassador to Addis Ababa and Nairobi from 1971 to 1977, a negotiating officer from the Ministry for Foreign Affairs from 1977 to 1981 and Finnish Ambassador to Beirut and Damascus 1981– 1984.

Hietanen began working as a trainee at the Foreign Ministry in 1956 and from 1958 he worked abroad in various countries until he became Finnish Ambassador to Ethiopia.
