= Olli Mennander =

Finnish diplomat

Olli Adolf Mennander (6 June 1936 Mikkeli - 6 October 2012 Helsinki) was a Finnish diplomat, a Bachelor of Political Science. He was the Finnish Ambassador at the Permanent Representation of International Organizations in Geneva 1986–1989, the negotiating official in the Ministry for Foreign Affairs 1989–1991, the Ambassador in Brussels 1991-1996 and Bern 1996–2001 -2001 He was accredited to the Holy See since 1991.
