= Mauno Castrén =

Finnish diplomat (1931–2021)

Mauno Jalmar Castrén (1931–2021) was a Finnish diplomat. He worked as a negotiating officer at the Ministry for Foreign Affairs and head of the Department of Trade Policy, Finland's Ambassador to Ankara in 1986–1991, Belgrade 1991–1992 and Sofia 1992–1994.
