= Yrjö Saastamoinen =

Finnish diplomat and CEO

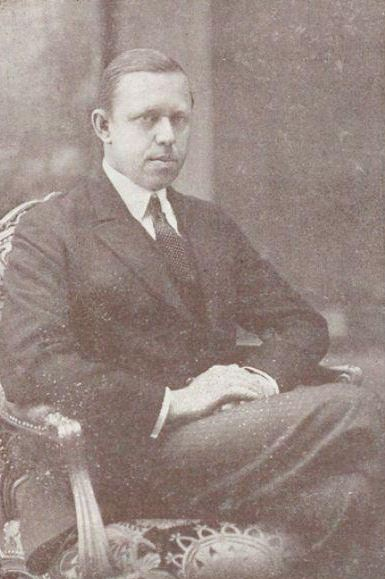

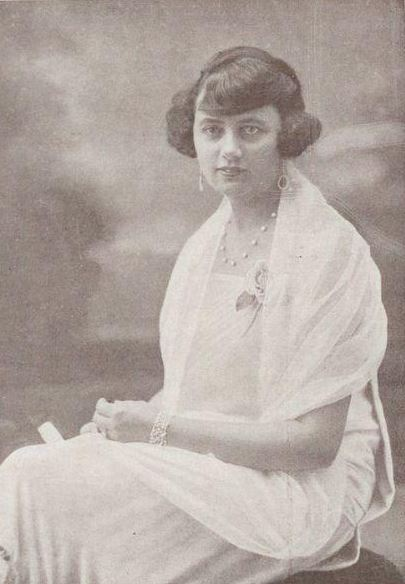

Yrjö Herman Saastamoinen (11 July 1888 Kuopio – 1966) was a Finnish diplomat and CEO.

The parents of Saastamo were Herman Saastamoinen and Alexandra Tengman. She graduated in 1907 and studied at several foreign universities from 1908 to 1914.

Saastamoinen was Assistant to the Embassy of Finland in Berlin in 1918, Secretary of the Ministry for Foreign Affairs, 1919, Chargé d'Affairesin The Hague in 1919, Chancellor in The Hague and Brussels from 1920 to 1921, Madrid and Lisbon from 1921 to 1922, and in The Hague, Brussels and Luxembourg from 1923 to 1926. He became a special envoy and a sovereign minister1927.

After the diplomatic missions, Saastamoinen was CEO of H. Saastamoinen Oy, Saastamoisen Faneri Oy and H. Saastamoinen & Pojat Oy since 1927.
