= Olavi Murto =

Finnish diplomat

Olavi Kalervo Murto (1911–1971) was a Finnish diplomat, with a degree in philosophy. He was a negotiating officer from the Ministry for Foreign Affairs from 1961 to 1963 and an ambassador in Brussels from 1963 to 1967. He was awarded the 1967 Order of the Lion of Finland.
