= Kurt Uggeldahl =

Finnish diplomat

Kurt Arvid Uggeldahl (1932–1988) was a Finnish diplomat, a master of political science by education. He has been in the Foreign Affairs since 1958 and was Finnish Ambassador to Pretoria from 1971 to 1974 and to Tehran and Islamabad from 1974 to 1979 and then head of the Protocol Department of the Ministry for Foreign Affairs 1979–1982, Finnish Ambassador to Ottawa from 1983 to 1985 and Consul General in Los Angeles 1985–1986.
