= Jorma Inki =

Finnish diplomat (born 1941)

Jorma Kalervo Inki (born 1941) is a Finnish diplomat, a Bachelor of Political Science degree. He has been the Finnish Ambassador in Belgrade 1988–1991. Head of the Administrative Department of the Ministry for Foreign Affairs 1991–1993, Ambassador in Oslo 1993–1999 and in Prague 2003–2007.
