= Helge von Knorring =

Finnish diplomat

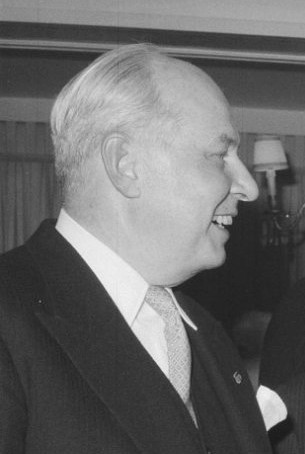
Helge von Knorring (1961)

Helge von Knorring (17 March 1897 Orivesi – 1985) was a Finnish diplomat. He served as Chargé d'affaires in Pretoria from 1949 to 1952, as Envoy to Beijing in 1952 and 1953 and Ambassador to Bern from 1953 to 1956. He was Head of the Protocol Department of the Ministry for Foreign Affairs and as rapporteur for Foreign Ministry ambassadors, he worked from 1956 to 1959; he also served as ambassador to Lisbon and The Hague from 1959 to 1964.
