= Jukka Pietikäinen =

Finnish diplomat (born 1956)

Jukka Tapio Pietikäinen (born 1956) is a Finnish diplomat. He was the Finnish Consul General in New York, where he moved from the post of Finnish Ambassador to Buenos Aires. Pietikäinen started his diplomatic career in 1985.
