= Ossi Sunell =

Finnish diplomat (1930–2021)

Ossi Juhani Sunell (10 January 1930 – 28 May 2021) was a Finnish diplomat.

Sunell was born in Helsinki on 10 January 1930. He earned a master's degree in political science. Sunell was ambassador in Algiers from 1972 to 1975, a negotiating officer from the Ministry for Foreign Affairs from 1975 to 1976, head of the Protocol Department from 1976 to 1979, Ambassador to Ottawa 1979–1982 and Paris 1983–1986, Inspector of Offices 1985–1987, Administrative Under-Secretary of State 1987–1990 and Ambassador in Rome 1990–1993. He died in Helsinki on 28 May 2021, at the age of 91.
