= Kaarlo Yrjö-Koskinen =

Finnish baron, journalist and diplomat (1930–2007)

Kaarlo Juhana Yrjö-Koskinen (26 March 1930 Helsinki – 16 April 2007 Helsinki) was a Finnish baron, journalist and diplomat. He worked in industrial organizations, but his significant contributions were in Finland's foreign affairs, where he served as the country's ambassador in several countries.

Yrjö-Koskinen graduated as a lawyer in 1955. His first job at the Ministry for Foreign Affairs was the secretary of the Honorary Consul in Rouen, France. These tasks were often unpopular and focused on trade relations and seafaring problems. After serving as an official in several Finnish delegations, Yrjö-Koskinen participated in the establishment of the OECD Delegation in Finland in 1968.

He was Head of the United Nations Economic Commission for Europe (ECE) Trade and Technology Department from 1970 to 1974 and Deputy Head of Trade Policy Department of the Finnish Ministry of Foreign Affairs from 1974 to 1976. Yrjö-Koskinen was Finland's ambassador in Budapest from 1977 to 1979, in Vienna and at the Holy See from 1983 to 1988 and in Oslo from 1988 to 1993. He was also the President of the Finnish Foreign Trade Association from 1979–1983.
