= Timo Jalkanen =

Finnish diplomat and jurist

Timo Jussi Jalkanen (born 5 January 1936) was a Finnish diplomat and jurist. He served as the Finnish Ambassador to Iran and Pakistan from 1983 to 1987, in the Philippines from 1987 to 1990 and in Ireland from 1996 to 2001. He also served as office manager for the Ministry for Foreign Affairs between 1978 and 1983, Deputy Director General of the Protocol Department from 1990 to 1995 and has been the head of department since 1995.
