= Martti Lintulahti =

Finnish diplomat

Martti Ilmari Lintulahti

Finnish Ambassador to Iraq
- In office 1973–1975

Finnish Ambassador to Brazil
- In office 1975–1982

Personal details
- Born: 1917
- Died: 1982 (aged 64–65)
- Education: Master of Political Science
- Occupation: Diplomat

Martti Ilmari Lintulahti (1917–1982) was a Finnish diplomat. He was a Chargé d'Affaires to Iraq from June 1969 to 29 December 1973, and Ambassador from 29 December 1973 to 1975. He was also Ambassador to Brazil from 1975 to 1982 and a negotiating officer in the Ministry for Foreign Affairs in 1982.
