= Antti Lassila =

Finnish diplomat

Antti Juhani Lassila (born November 8, 1932, in Lapua) is a Finnish diplomat, a Bachelor of Political Science degree, a Councilor of Honor. He has been a negotiating officer of the Ministry for Foreign Affairs 1981-1985, Consul General in New York City 1985-1989, Ambassador to Tripoli 1989-1991, Riga 1991-1995 and Athens 1995 -1997–1997. Lassila began his work at the Ministry for Foreign Affairs in 1961. She has been the founder of the Paasikivi Society, the Foreign Policy Institute, the Association of Finnish Watercolor Art and the Arctic Society of Finland. Lassila's wife was reporter Sirkka Lassila
