= Anne Lammila =

Finnish diplomat (born 1957)

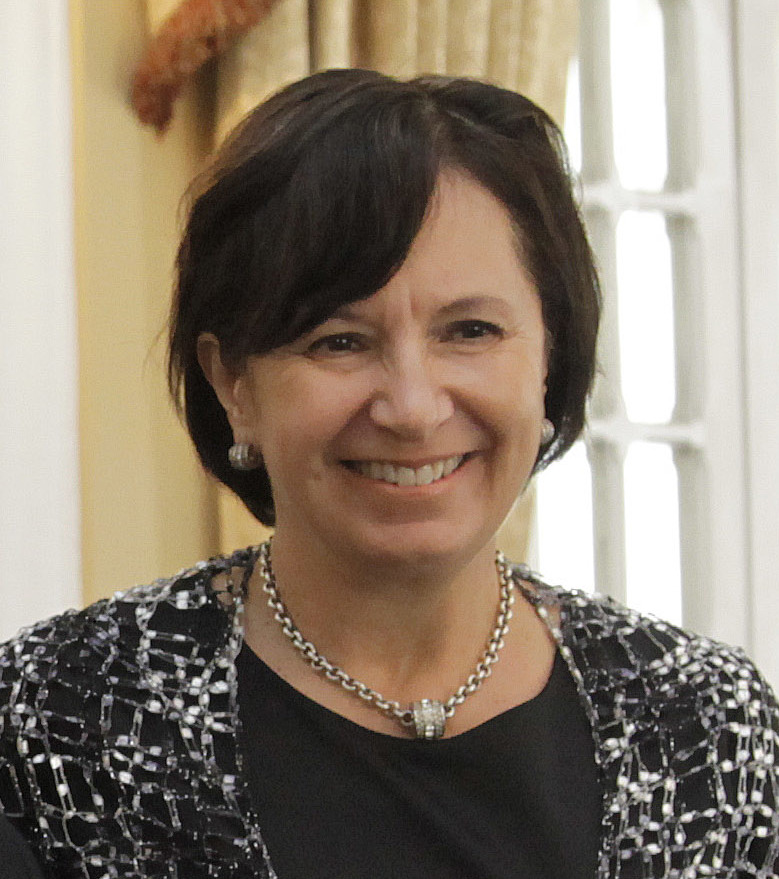
Lammila, 2015

Raija Anne Lammila (born 6 December 1957) is a Finnish diplomat.

== Career ==
Lammila has been the Finnish Ombudsman for Equal Opportunity in the Ministry for Foreign Affairs since the autumn of 2015. Before that she was the Finnish Ambassador to Mexico from 2011 to 2015 and has represented Finland in nine other countries: Cuba, Haiti, Nicaragua, Honduras, Guatemala, El Salvador, Costa Rica, Panama and Belize.

Previously, she has worked at the Finnish Embassies in Brazil, Madrid, Paris (Unesco) and Washington. In 2015, the House of Representative of the Mexican Congress inaugurated her as an honorary doctorate for her work for children and young people to have the right to education.

== Personal life ==
Since the 1980s Anne Lammila has been married to journalist Markku Saksa.
