= Heikki Leppo =

Finnish diplomat (1906–1987)

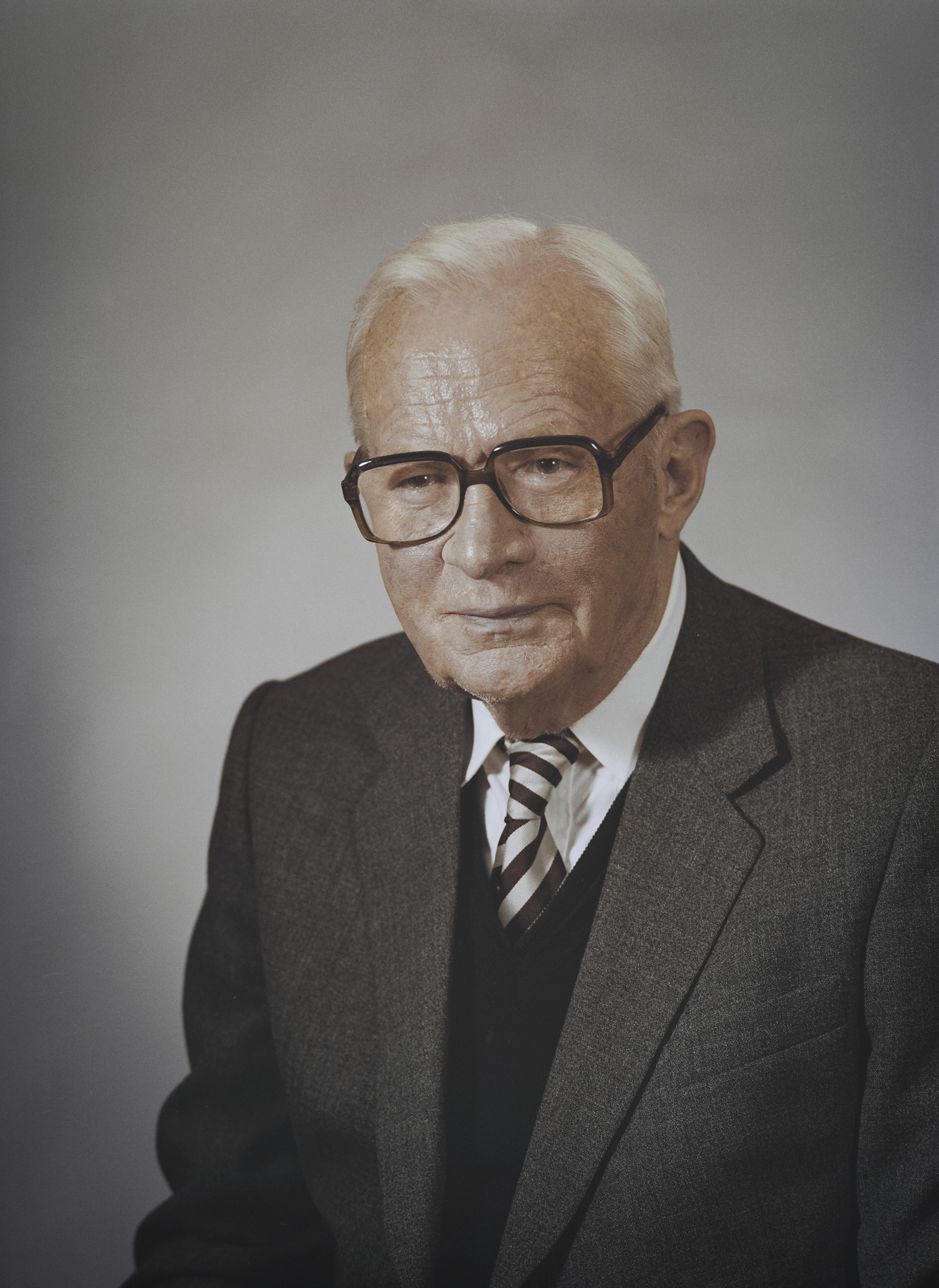
Heikki Leppo in 1986.

Niilo Heikki Antero Leppo (8 November 1906 Vihti – November 16, 1987 ) was a Finnish diplomat. He worked in Switzerland from 1946 to 1948 as Chargé d'Affaires of Finland. He was appointed Envoy to Buenos Aires in 1955 and in 1957 he received the ambassador's status.

From 1961, he was the rapporteur for the ambassadors. and 1964-1974 Finland's Ambassador to Brazil

His brother was economist Matti Leppo.
