= Timo Koponen =

Finnish diplomat

Timo Heikki Koponen (18 April 1942 – 17 February 2023) was a Finnish diplomat, a master of political science. He was Minister Counselor in Copenhagen 1981–1985, Head of Office at the Ministry for Foreign Affairs 1985–1989, Ambassador of Finland in Jakarta 1989–1992 and Bucharest 1992– 1996. He was also an ambassador in Reykjavík 2000–2004.
