= Mikko Jokela (diplomat) =

Finnish diplomat and civil servant

Mikko Samuli Jokela (born. 15 October 1947) is a Finnish diplomat and civil servant. He worked as a protocol manager at the Ministry for Foreign Affairs between 2010 and 2012 until his retirement. In 2005-2010, Jokela was Ambassador to the Netherlands.

Jokela joined the Ministry of Foreign Affairs in 1976 and worked as Secretary of State for Foreign Affairs and the State Secretary as well as for various positions in Trade Policy and Political Affairs, including Head of Research and Planning Unit. Jokela also worked at the embassies of Bonn, Budapest, Stockholm and the Consul General in Hamburg (2001-2005).

In 2005-2010, Jokela served as Ambassador to the Netherlands in The Hague. He also represented Finland at the United Nations Organisation for the Prohibition of Chemical Weapons (OPCW), which is also located in The Hague.

1 February 2010 Jokela started as a protocol manager at the Ministry for Foreign Affairs. He left the job retiring in 2012.
