= Alexander Amatus Thesleff =

Finnish diplomat and lawyer

- Born: 25 March 1907; Viipuri
- Died: 6 November 1983 (aged 76)
- Occupations: Diplomat, Lawyer
- Office: Head of the Administrative Department of the Ministry for Foreign Affairs

Alexander Amatus Thesleff (25 March 1907 – 6 November 1983) was a Finnish diplomat and a lawyer. He was Head of the Administrative Department of the Ministry for Foreign Affairs 1958-1959 and Head of the Legal Department 1964–1966. He was an ambassador in Brussels and Luxembourg from 1959 to 1963, and in Dublin from 1962 to 1963. He was in active from 1963 to 1964. In 1973, he was appointed to Chile, but his main place of work was in Buenos Aires, Argentina, where he was the Envoy in 1966–1974.
