= Yrjö Väänänen =

Finnish diplomat (1929–1999)

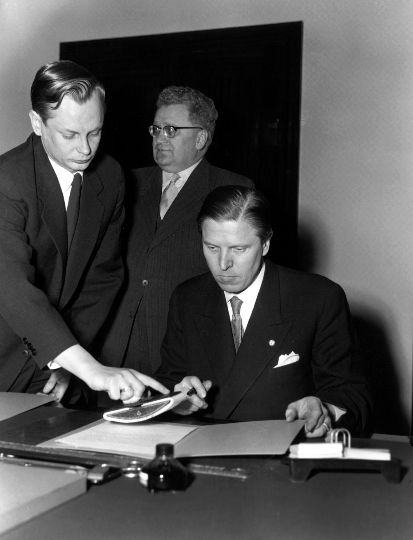
Yrjö Väänänen (to the left) blotting the signature of the minister Johannes Virolainen in 1955. Behind them, the Soviet Ambassador Viktor Z. Lebedev.

Yrjö Olavi Väänänen (20 July 1929 in Vyborg, Finland – 21 March 1999 in Helsinki) was a Finnish diplomat. He was a Licentiate in Law and was an Ambassador in Bonn from 1973 to 1974, Head of the Department of the Ministry of Foreign Affairs from 1974 to 1976, Undersecretary of State from 1976 to 1977, Ambassador in Copenhagen from 1977 to 1985, Counselor of the Ministry of Foreign Affairs 1985–1986.

Väänänen had an important role in the post-war Finland–West Germany diplomacy. In 1991, he published his memoirs, Finlandia, Bonn, which were also translated from Finnish into German in 1996.
