= Arto Tanner =

Finnish diplomat

Arto Ensio Tanner (January 9, 1935, Helsinki - October 18, 2002, Helsinki) was a Finnish diplomat and Bachelor of Law. He was Deputy charge d'affaires at Baghdad 1967–1969, Ambassador in Beirut 1977–1981, Damascus 1979-1981 and Kuwait City 1977–1980, Deputy Director General in the Ministry of Foreign Affairs 1981–1982, Diplomatic Inspector since 1983, Ambassador to East Berlin 1986–1990, Tel Aviv 1993-1997 and Athens, 1998–2000.

Tanner's son Teemu Tanner is a diplomat and President's Permanent Chief of Staff.
