= Kaarlo Mäkelä =

Finnish diplomat and ambassador

Kaarlo Veikko Mäkelä (4 October 1909 in Hamina – 16 October 2000 in Helsinki) was a Finnish diplomat and ambassador. He graduated as Master in Philosophy in 1945. He was a commercial representative in the Federal Republic of Germany from 1964 to 1968, before the embassy was established. Thereafter, he was Ambassador in Bucharest from 1968 to 1972, part of the administrative department of the Ministry for Foreign Affairs 1973–1974 and Ambassador in Bern from 1974 to 1976.
