= Hugo Valvanne =

Finnish diplomat

Hugo Valvanne (1894–1961) was a Finnish diplomat. He was the first envoy of Finland to India, and took up his post shortly after diplomatic relations between the two countries were established on 1 October 1949.
