= Tom Grönberg =

Finnish diplomat and Master of Law

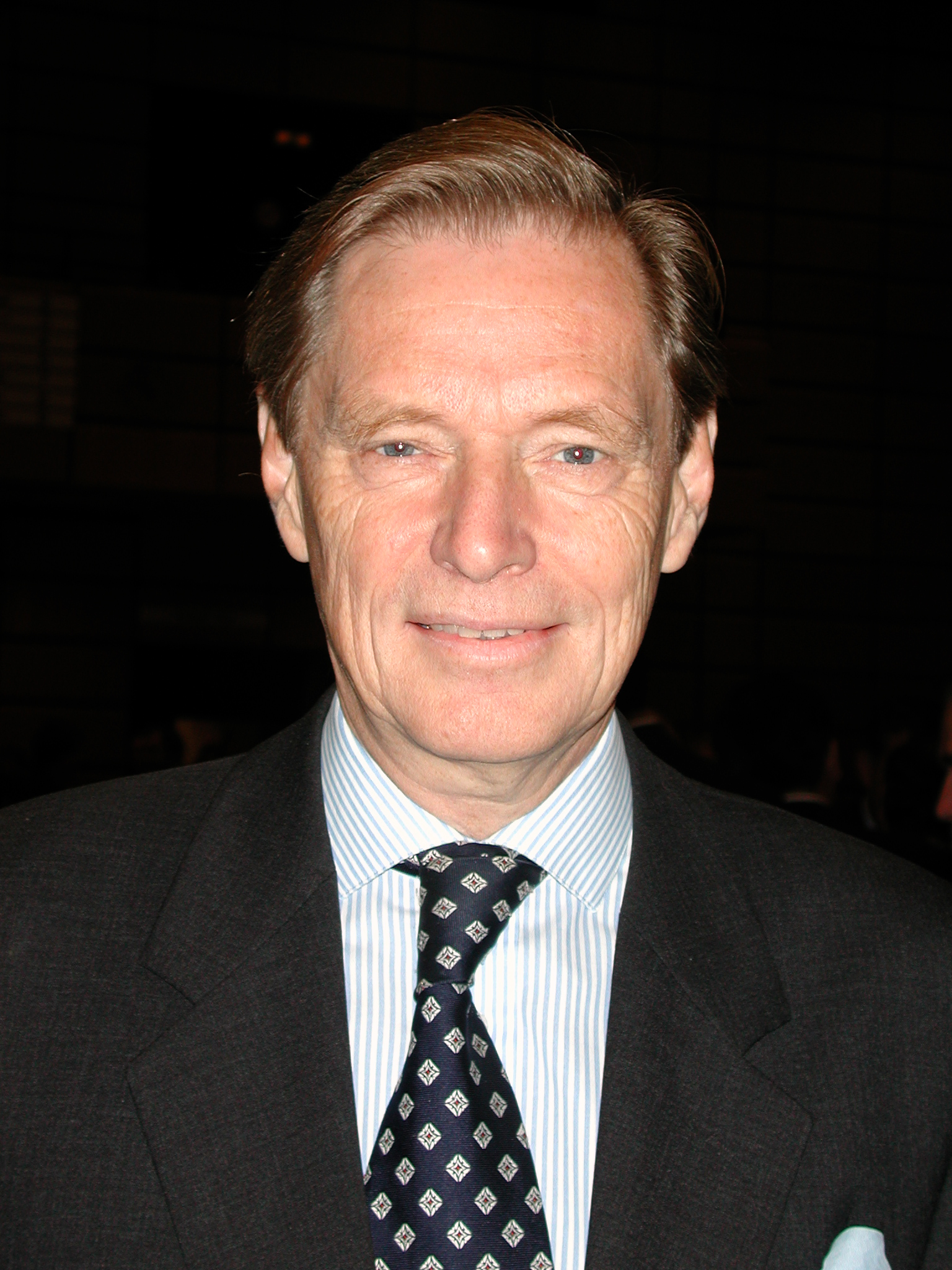
Tom Grönberg (2001)

Tom Carl Ernst Grönberg (born 8 November 1941 in Helsinki) is a Finnish diplomat and Master of Law (1966).

Grönberg has been Ambassador to Nairobi and Addis Ababa 1983–1987, Deputy Director General of the Legal Department of the Ministry for Foreign Affairs 1987–1990 and Head of Department 1990–1994. He was an ambassador to the Council of Europe in 1994–1998 and in Vienna, Ljubljana and Bratislava 1998–2005.
