= Olavi Raustila =

Finnish diplomat

Erdem Olavi Raustila, until 1941 Ramstedt (10 December 1904 Lahti – ?) was a Finnish diplomat. He was employed by the Confederation of Finnish Wood Processing Industries in 1945–1959 and then moved to 1959 as a negotiating officer for the Ministry for Foreign Affairs. He was Ambassador to Belgrade and Athens 1961–1965, Budapest 1965–1969 and Athens.

His father was G. J. Ramstedt.
