= Olli Kaila =

Finnish diplomat, lawyer and banker

Olli Benjamin Kaila (24 February 1918 in Helsinki – 23 April 2014 in Helsinki) was a Finnish diplomat, lawyer and banker. Kaila served as ambassador in Copenhagen, 1959–1961 and the Finnish Permanent Mission of the United Nations in Geneva 1961–1962. He was a member of the Board of Directors of the National Bank 1962–1983 and Vice-President of the General Director since 1975.

Kaila graduated in 1943 as a lawyer and earned the rank of Master of Law in 1946.

His father was a man named Eino Kaila, a notable Finnish philosopher.
