= Kai Helenius =

Finnish diplomat and ambassador

Kai Helmer Helenius (1931–2023) was a Finnish diplomat and ambassador. He has a master's degree in engineering and has served as ambassador in Jeddah and Abu Dhabi 1977–1982. Between 1983 and 1986, he was a negotiating officer of the Ministry of Foreign Affairs, 1987–1990 Under-Secretary of State for Development and again ambassador in Bonn in 1990–1996.
