= Henry Söderholm =

Finnish diplomat (1938–2015)

Henry Söderholm (17 April 1938 in Turku – 15 July 2015 in Helsinki) was a Finnish diplomat. He was Ambassador to Baghdad 1987–1990, Bern 1992-1996 and in Luxembourg 1998-2001
