= Pekka Harttila =

Finnish diplomat and lawyer

Pekka Matti Harttila (born 1941) is a Finnish diplomat and a lawyer. He has served as Assistant Director in the Ministry for Foreign Affairs of the Ministry for Foreign Affairs from 1986 to 1988, Ambassador in Riyadh 1988–1991, Consul General in Berlin 1991-1994 and Head of Press and Culture Division since 1995. He has again been Ambassador in Bucharest 2000–2004
