= Erik Hellqvist =

Finnish diplomat

Erik Håkan Hellqvist (5 June 1927 – 26 July 2004) was a Finnish diplomat. He was the Consul General of Finland in Gothenburg from March 1, 1973, to 1977 and Finnish Ambassador to Lusaka from 1980 to 1983. From 1984 to 1988 he was a negotiating officer from the Ministry for Foreign Affairs, from 1988 to 1989, Ambassador to Kuala Lumpur and again from 1989 the State Secretary for Negotiation. Hellqvist died on 26 July 2004, at the age of 77.
