= Ragnar Smedslund =

Finnish diplomat (1900–1981)

Ragnar Smedslund (13 April 1900, in Helsinki – 1981) was a Finnish diplomat. He was Master of Philosophy and served as Consul General in Tokyo 1952–1957, as Ambassador 1957–1962. He was a negotiating officer of the Ministry for Foreign Affairs since 1962, when he received the Special Envoy and the value of a sovereign minister. He was ambassador in Lisbon and Bern in 1965–1967.
