= Lasse Oka =

Finnish diplomat and economist

Lasse Veli Oka (31 July 1923 – 1 July 2007) was a Finnish diplomat and economist. He was the Finnish Consul General to Los Angeles 1983–1985 and Finnish Ambassador to Bogotá 1985–1988.
