= Algar von Heiroth =

Finnish diplomat (1908–1988)

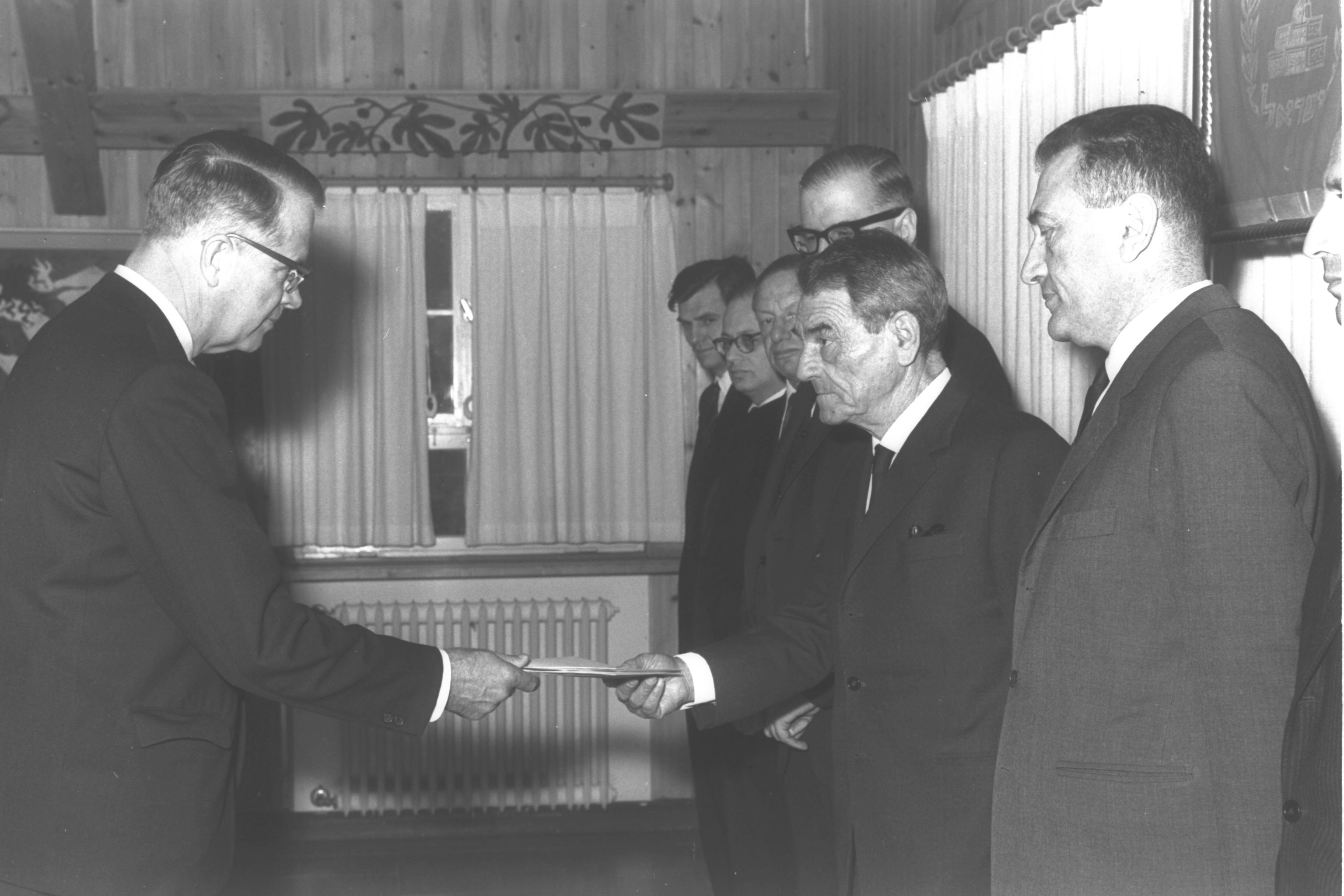
Finnish Ambassador Algar von Heiroth presenting his credentials to acting president, Speaker of Knesset Kadish Luz in Jerusalem in 1966

Algar Rurik Alexander von Heiroth (28 May 1908 – 1988) was a Finnish diplomat and a Bachelor of Philology. He was Finnish Ambassador to Mexico and to Cuba from 1964 to 1966 and to Israel from 1966 to 1975.
