= Ensio Helaniemi =

Finnish diplomat (1926–2009)

Kaarle Ensio Ilmari Helaniemi (till 1936 Helenius, 15 October 1926 Helsinki - December 23, 2009) was a Finnish diplomat, a Master of Law. He was Ambassador to Lagos from 1971 to 1973, then Head of the Legal Department of the Ministry of Foreign Affairs from 1976 to 1978, Ambassador to The Hague from 1978 to 1983, then to East Berlin 1983–1986, Foreign Minister's Negotiating Officer 1986-1989 and Ambassador to Brussels 1989–1991.
