= Åke Backström =

Finnish diplomat

Åke Ossian Gunnar Backström (30 May 1919 – 8 June 2005) was a Finnish diplomat, a licentiated in law. He was an Ambassador in Canberra from 1975 to 1980, a negotiating officer from the Foreign Ministry from 1980 to 1983 and Ambassador to Sofia in 1983–1986.

He was born in Tampere and died in Helsinki.
