= Unto Tanskanen =

Finnish diplomat and lawyer (1931–2021)

Unto Kalervo Tanskanen (8 July 1931 – 20 February 2021) was a Finnish diplomat and lawyer. He was Finnish Ambassador to Hanoi from 1974 to 1977, and to Nairobi and to Addis Ababa from 1977 to 1980, and to Tehran and to Islamabad from 1980 to 1983, and from 1983 a negotiating official in the Ministry for Foreign Affairs. Tanskanen died on 20 February 2021, at the age of 89.
