= Jussi Montonen =

Finnish diplomat

Juha (Jussi) Olavi Montonen (1 May 1924, Helsinki – 10 October 2015, Helsinki) was a Finnish diplomat.

He was a Bachelor of Philosophy degree. He was Ambassador of Finland to Madrid in 1969–1972, in Warsaw from 1972 to 1976, Head of the Administrative Department of the Ministry for Foreign Affairs from 1976 to 1978, Ambassador Mexico City from 1978 to 1984 and Bucharest in 1984–1986. He was also the general consul in Los Angeles
