= Finnicization =

Changing of personal names from other languages into Finnish

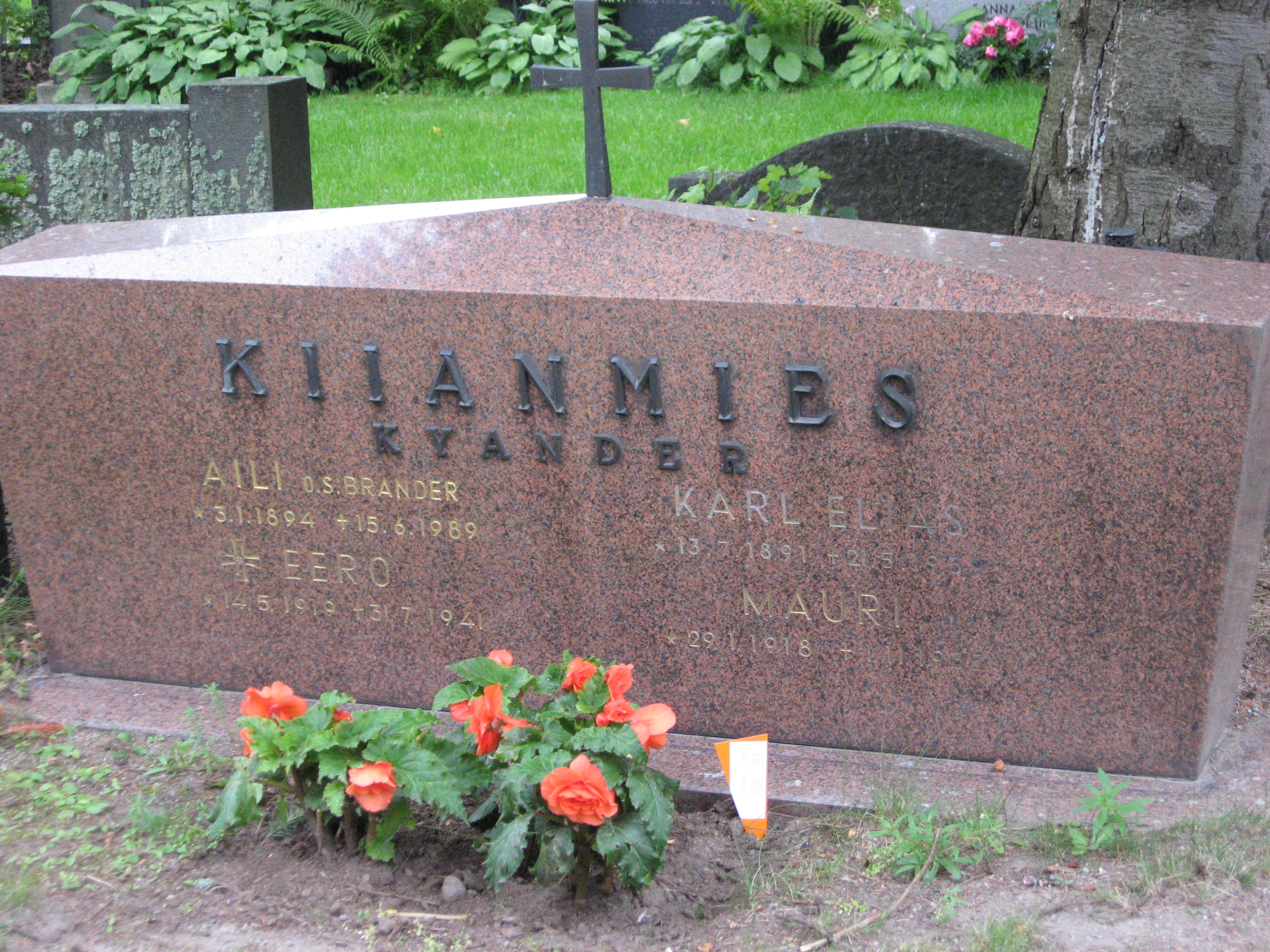
A set of graves in Tampere, showing the Swedish surname 'Kyander' as well as the finnicized 'Kiianmies'.

Finnicization (also finnicisation, fennicization, fennicisation) is the changing of one's personal names from other languages (usually Swedish) into Finnish. During the era of National Romanticism in Finland, many people, especially Fennomans, finnicized their previously Swedish family names.

Some of these people were descended from Finnish-speaking farmers who had previously changed their Finnish names to Swedish ones after climbing the social ladder. This was an understandable stratagem, as official positions (and even many trades) were open only to those who spoke Swedish, and a Finnish name would have been an impediment to success.

A notable event in finnicization was the centenary, in 1906, 100 years after the birth of the philosopher and statesman Johan Vilhelm Snellman. The author Johannes Linnankoski encouraged Finns to give up their Swedish names on 12 May, Snellman's birthday. During 1906 and 1907, about 70,000 Finns changed their names.

In 1935, 74,064 persons also changed their family name, and in the following year, 24,000 more. A law to facilitate changing one's family name was passed in 1934.

The 1906–1907 name change process in Finland was a model for Estonianizing family names in Estonia. Although the law had been in effect since 1919, the mass changes took place during the second wave in Finland, 1935–1940, and a similar law facilitating changes to one's family name was passed just two weeks earlier than in Finland. During that time 195,000 persons or 17% of the Estonian population changed their family name.

== Finnicized names ==
Finnish name introduced	Former name	Notable users	Year of change	Source
Arvelo	Achrén	Armas Arvelo, Ritva Arvelo's father	1906	
Ahtisaari	Adolfsen	Oiva Ahtisaari, Martti Ahtisaari's father	1935	
Ahtovuo	Adolfsen		1936	
Äimä	Aejmelaeus		1937, 1939	
Artola	Ahlgren		1926	
Alaja	Alander		1935	
Arohonka	Alén		1932	
Arajärvi	Alin	Juhani Arajärvi	1906	
Almi	Alm		1934	
Tuomas-Kettunen	Alopaeus		1935	
Ahjopalo	Andelin	Toivo Ahjopalo	1935	
Ypyä	Andersson			
Asanti	Aschan	Atle Asanti	1937	
Airasmaa	Aschan		1932	
Ahmavaara	Aulin	Pekka Ahmavaara	1906	
Ailio	Ax	Julius Ailio	1897	
Visapää	Backberg		1932	
Wuorenheimo	Bergbom	Ossian Wuorenheimo	1903	
Wuorenrinne	Berggrén		1906	
Kalliala	Bergroth		1906	
Vuorenjuuri	Bergroth		1906, 1907	
Vanni	Besprosvanni	Sam Vanni	1941	
Visanti	Björklund		1936	
Rantasalo	Björni	Onni Rantasalo	1906	
Wuorimaa/Vuorimaa	Blomberg	Aarne Wuorimaa and Artur Wuorimaa	1906, 1923	
Kilpi	Blomros	Eino Kilpi		
Jalas	Blomstedt		1906, 1943	
Kaira	Bodström		1906	
Poijärvi	Boijer		1906	
Parvilahti	Boman		1944	
Linnala	Borgman		1906	
Paloheimo	Brander		1906	
Palosuo	Brander		1933	
Tulikoura	Brandstaka		1906	
Honka	Bremer		1906	
Aho	Brofeldt	Juhani Aho	1907	
Palo	Brännäs	Tauno Palo	1932	
Välikangas/Wälikangas	Buddén	Martti Välikangas and Eino Wälikangas	1906	
Alhava	Byckling		1935	
Puro	Bäckman	Teuvo Puro	1904	
Puroma	Bäckman			
Kalela	Cajander		1935	
Kannisto	Candelin		1906	
Kannila	Cannelin		1938	
Linkola	Collan	Kaarlo Linkola	1906	
Ylänne	Dahlgren		1906	
Turkka	Durchman	Rolf Turkka		
Enäjärvi	Eklund		1922	
Mikkola	Eklund			
Tunkelo	Ekman		1901, 1906	
Jalavisto	Elmgren		1934	
Enne	Enbom			
Aario	Engman		1928	
Etola	Etholén		1935	
Äyräpää	Europaeus		1876, 1930	
Havu	Falck		1906	
Kaarnakari	Fallenius		1935	
Vennamo	Fennander	Veikko Vennamo	1938	
Alkio	Filander	Santeri Alkio	1898	
Linkomies	Flinck	Edvin Linkomies	1927	
Koskikallio	Forsberg		1906	
Koskimies	Forsman	A. V. Koskimies	1906, 1926, 1931	
Yrjö-Koskinen	Forsman	Yrjö Sakari Yrjö-Koskinen	1882	
Koskenniemi	Forsnäs	V. A. Koskenniemi	1906	
Arni	Forsström		1933	
Hainari	Forsström	Oskar Hainari	1906	
Pohjanpalo	Friis	Tuomas Pohjanpalo	1906	
Jännes	Genetz		1906	
Kuusi	Granfelt		1906	
Talas	Gratschoff	Onni Talas	1895	
Rautapää	Gröndahl	Hugo Rautapää	1906	
Aura	Gröndahl		1906	
Wiherheimo	Grönhag	T. A. Wiherheimo	1906	
Kuusisto	Grönlund		1906	
Rantakari	Grönqvist		1896	
Pinomaa	Gulin		1906, 1935	
Paasilinna	Gullsten	Väinö Paasilinna, Arto, Reino and Erno Paasilinna's father	before 1934	
Pihkala	Gummerus	Lauri Pihkala	1906	
Halsti	Hagman		1936	
Kallia	Hallsten		1906	
Haarla	Harberg		1906	
Harva	Heerman		1926	
Heikinheimo	Heikel		1906	
Päivänsalo	Helander		1906	
Helanen	Helander	Vilho Helanen		
Hattara	Helenius			
Helismaa	Helenius	Reino Helismaa	1935	
Heljas	Helenius	Lennart Heljas	1935	
Helo	Helenius	Johan Helo	1906	
Rahola	Helenius	Eero Rahola	1906	
Waltari	Helenius	Gustaf Helenius, Mika Waltari's grandfather		
Heliövaara	Helin		1906	
Harvila	Hellberg		1931	
Holma	Hellman	Harri Holma	1906	
Paasikivi	Hellsten	J. K. Paasikivi	1887	
Saarenpää	Herckman		1906	
Hiitonen	Hidén	Ensio Hiitonen	1923	
Kaira	Hildén		1909	
Osara	Hildén		1935	
Palojärvi	Hildén		1906	
Hiekkala	Hoffrén	Lassi Hiekkala	1907	
Soini	Hoffrén		1877, 1906	
Harima	Hohenthal		1936	
Harva	Holmberg	Uno Harva	1927	
Karikoski	Holmström		1906	
Harki	Hultman		1935	
Paasivuori	Hällberg/Hälleberg	Matti Paasivuori	1906	
Helasvuo	Hällström		1926	
Paasivirta	Hällström, af Hällström		1906, 1907, 1935	
Paasio	Hällström/Hellström	Rafael Paasio	1906	
Heporauta	Hästesko		1935	
Rihtniemi	Högman		1908	
Ivalo	Ingman		1907	
Koskenjaakko	Jakobsson		1906	
Jaari	Jankeloff	Ruben Jaari	1936	
Wihuri	Jansson		1906	
Rautavaara/Rautawaara	Jernberg	Eino A. Rautavaara, Einojuhani Rautavaara's father	1895, 1901, 1907	
Rautavuori	Jernberg		1943	
Järviluoma	Jernström	Artturi Järviluoma	1902	
Rautavirta	Järnström		1906	
Airo	Johansson	A. F. Airo	1906	
Kaila	Johansson	Erkki Kaila and Eino Kaila	1901, 1902, 1906	
Somerjoki	Johansson	Gunnar Somerjoki, Rauli Somerjoki's father	1936	
Vannas	Johansson		1905	
Soininen	Johnsson	Mikael Soininen	1906	
Soisalon-Soininen	Johnsson	Eliel Soisalon-Soininen	1904	
Jousi	Junnelius		1906	
Juva	Juvelius	Einar W. Juva and Mikko Juva	1935	
Jalanti	Jämsén			
Rauanheimo	Järnefelt		1906	
Kahanpää	Kahelin		1937	
Karisto	Karlsson		1906	
Kairamo	Kihlman	Oswald Kairamo	1906	
Kulomäki	Kindt		1935	
Kataja	Kollin			
Kurki-Suonio	Krohn		1928	
Kalha	Kronqvist	Heikki Kalha		
Kulo	Källberg		1906	
Lehto	Lagerlund	Reino R. Lehto	1901	
Lahdensuo	Lagerstedt		1906	
Hirvensalo	Lagus	Gabriel Hirvensalo	1903, 1906	
Kalima	Landgren		1906	
Leikola	Leidenius	Erkki Leikola and Aare Leikola	1906	
Listo	Lilius		1906	
Niini	Lind			
Hiekka	Lindell		1906	
Leppälä	Lindeqvist		1906	
Koskelo	Lindgren		1918	
Apajalahti	Lindqvist		1906	
Airisto	Lindroos			
Linko	Lindroth		1906	
Liro	Lindroth		1906	
Loimaranta	Lindstedt		1906	
Merikoski	Lindstedt		1906	
Niinistö	Lindström	Juho Niinistö, Sauli Niinistö's grandfather		
Sarva	Lindström		1914	
Louhivuori	Lohtander	Oskari Wilho Louhivuori	1905	
Saarnio	Lundén		1911	
Maasalo	Masalin		1905	
Malmivaara	Malmberg		1906	
Mela	Malmberg		1876	
Merikanto	Mattsson		1882	
Mannermaa	Menander		1906	
Miesmaa	Messman		1906	
Kivalo	Mittler		1935	
Muroma	Murén		1919	
Nevanlinna	Neovius	Ernst Nevanlinna	1906	
Nuorpuu	Nordblom		1928	
Pohjanpää	Nordqvist		1906	
Nuorivaara	Nyberg			
Nuorteva	Nyberg	Santeri Nuorteva	1906, 1919	
Laitakari	Nybergh		1906	
Airila	Nyholm		1906	
Nuorvala	Nylenius	Aarne Nuorvala	1934	
Ilves	Nyman		1906	
Niitemaa	Nyman		1942	
Näre	Nyman			
Järventaus	Ockenström		1903	
Suviranta	Olander		1906	
Paatola	Packalin			
Suolahti	Palander	Hugo Suolahti	1906	
Salmenoja	Palin		1907	
Paalu	Palkén		1934	
Paatela	Pavén		1906	
Osmonsalo	Relander		1906	
Reenpää	Renqvist	Yrjö Reenpää	1935	
Reenkola	Renvall		1939	
Sotavalta	Richter		1900	
Orjatsalo	Riddelin	Aarne Orjatsalo	1901	
Sillanpää	Riktig	Miina Sillanpää		
Rinkama	Ringbom		1935	
Ruusuvaara	Rosberg		1906	
Routavaara	Rosvall		1928	
Jurkka	Rothström			
Ruutu	Ruuth		1927	
Ritavuori	Rydman	Heikki Ritavuori	1905	
Sadeniemi	Sadenius		1906, 1928	
Saalas	Sahlberg		1906	
Sortta	Sahlbom		1932	
Ilvessalo	Sarén		1911	
Saraste	Sarlin		1942	
Savonjousi	Savonius		1936	
Sauli	Saxelin	Jalmari Sauli	1908	
Harmaja	Schadewitz			
Utsjoki	Schlüter		1935	
Rauramo	Schroderus		1935	
Koulumies	Schulman		1940	
Mustakallio	Schwartzberg		1906	
Saura	Selenius		1929	
Särkilahti	Serlachius	Allan Serlachius	1935	
Hersalo	Sigell		1935	
Siloma	Sillman		about 1930	
Simojoki	Simelius	Elias Simojoki and Martti Simojoki	1926, 1928	
Sirola	Sirén	Yrjö Sirola	1896	
Salokannel	Sirenius		1898	
Sirpo	Sirob (alk. Wolfson)			
Susitaival	Sivén	Paavo Susitaival	1927	
Virkkunen	Snellman	Paavo Virkkunen	1906	
Solanko	Sohlman	Risto Solanko	1935	
Somersalo	Sommer		1906	
Kivekäs	Stenbäck	Lauri Kivekäs	1876, 1926	
Kivikoski	Stenfors			
Korpijaakko	Stenius			
Isonokari	Stornogar		1903	
Renkonen	Streng		1940	
Kivirikko	Stenroos		1906	
Teräsvuori	Ståhlberg		1906	
Siilasvuo	Strömberg	Hjalmar Siilasvuo	1936	
Sarkia	Sulin	Kaarlo Sarkia		
Sola	Sundberg		1906	
Palolampi	Sundström		1927	
Salmiala	Sundström	Bruno Salmiala	1935	
Somerto	Sundström			
Rislakki	Svanberg		1934	
Svento	Sventorzetski	Reinhold Svento	1938	
Saarimaa	Söderholm		1905	
Sarparanta	Söderman		1936	
Sotamaa	Söderman			
Suvivuo	Söderström	Väinö Suvivuo		
Tuulio	Tallgren	Tyyni Tuulio	1933	
Honkajuuri	Tallroth		1906	
Tavastähti	Tavaststjerna		1905	
Tanner	Thomasson	Väinö Tanner	1895	
Talvela	Thorén	Paavo Talvela	1906	
Tuura	Thrulsson			
Tulenheimo	Thulé	Antti Tulenheimo	1906	
Tuurna	Thuneberg		1935	
Tuuliluoto	Tillaeus			
Tarjanne	Törnqvist	Päivö Tarjanne	1906	
Hiidenheimo	Törnström	Artturi Hiidenheimo and Pentti Hiidenheimo	1906	
Vähäkallio	Vilander		1905	
Vihma	Wichmann	Einar Vihma	1936	
Vala	Wadenström	Katri Vala	1928	
Valste	Wahlstedt	Armas Valste	1934	
Vaaskivi	Wahlstén		1935	
Vakio	Walldén		1935	
Wallinmaa	Wallenius		1912	
Voionmaa	Wallin	Väinö Voionmaa	1906	
Waris	Warén	Klaus Waris	1924, 1935	
Valvanne	Wegelius	Hugo Valvanne	1906	
Vuorjoki	Wegelius		1906, 1929	
Väisälä	Weisell	Vilho Väisälä and Yrjö Väisälä	1906	
Wennervirta	Wennerström		1926	
Aaltonen	Widell	Emil Aaltonen	1890	
Wilkama	Wilkman	Karl Fredrik Wilkama	1919	
Meriluoto	Willman	Kaarlo Meriluoto, Aila Meriluoto's father	1905	
Veistaro	Winqvist		1935	
Voipio	Åkerman		1901	
Orasmaa	Österman	Niilo Orasmaa	1906	

== See also ==
- Finnicization of Helsinki
- Hebraization of surnames
