= Order of the Lion of Finland =

Honorary chivalry order

Order of the Lion of Finland: Suomen Leijonan ritarikunta; Finlands Lejons orden
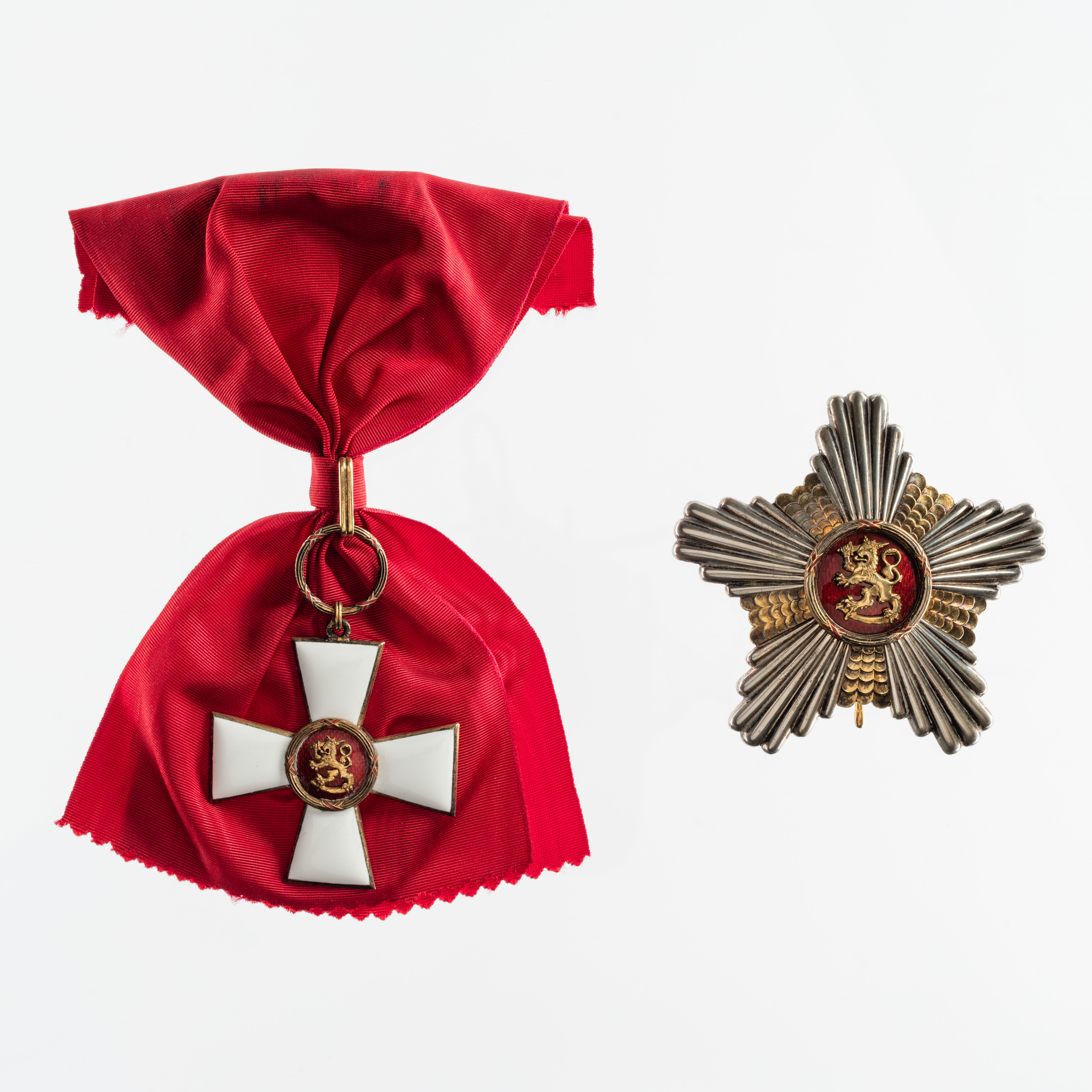
- The sash and the breast star of the order

Awarded by Finland
- Type: State order
- Established: September 11, 1942; 84 years ago
- Country: Finland
- Seat: House of the Estates
- Ribbon: Red
- Eligibility: Finnish nationals and foreigners
- Criteria: For significant civilian or military merits
- Status: Currently constituted
- Founder: Risto Ryti
- Grand Master: Alexander Stubb
- Chancellor: Timo Laitinen
- Vice-Chancellor: Anita Lehikoinen
- Classes: Grand Cross; First Class Commander; Commander; First Class Knight; Knight
- Website: ritarikunnat.fi/language/en

Statistics
- First induction: September 28, 1942

Precedence
- Next (higher): Order of the Cross of Liberty
- Next (lower): Cross of Merit for Finnish Physical Education and Sports
- Ribbon of the Order of the Lion of Finland

The Order of the Lion of Finland (Finnish: Suomen Leijonan ritarikunta; Swedish: Finlands Lejons orden) is one of three official orders in Finland, along with the Order of the Cross of Liberty and the Order of the White Rose of Finland. The President of Finland is the Grand Master of all three orders. The orders are administered by boards consisting of a chancellor, a vice-chancellor and at least four members. The orders of the White Rose of Finland and the Lion of Finland have a joint board. The President of Finland wears the Star of the Order of the Lion of Finland.

== History ==
The Order of the Lion of Finland was established on September 11, 1942. At that time, Finland was waging the Continuation War. Wartime diplomacy included a heightened need to decorate, particularly foreigners from aligned countries, chiefly Germany. The existing Finnish orders, the Order of the Cross of Liberty and the Order of the White Rose of Finland, could not keep up with the decorations and their highest grades were in danger of becoming inflated due to the presence of too many holders. The Order of the Lion of Finland was thus established to allow the continuation of decorating foreigners with high ranks in Finnish orders, although the Order of the Lion of Finland can also be awarded to Finnish nationals. The new order also allowed for more flexible decorations, taking in account the rank and achievements of the recipients.

In January 1998, President Martti Ahtisaari was criticized by some NGOs, politicians and notable cultural figures for awarding the Commander of the Order of the Lion of Finland to Djamaludin Suryohadikusumo, the Forest Minister of Indonesia, and to Sukanto Tanoto, the main owner of the Indonesian RGM Company, a parent company of the April Company. The April Company was criticized by non-governmental organisations for destroying rainforests, and Indonesia itself was criticized heavily for human right violations, especially in East Timor. Ahtisaari's party chairman Erkki Tuomioja said that giving the medals was questionable, since he feared the act may tarnish the public image of Finnish human rights policy. Students of the arts had demonstrations in Helsinki against the decision to give medals. Artist Marjatta Hanhijoki and author Leena Krohn returned their Pro Finlandia medals to protest the Indonesian decorations.

Finnish Olympic and Paralympic medalists are awarded either the Knight or Knight, First Class medal, with clasps.

Ambassadors accredited to Helsinki are given the Grand Cross upon leaving their post, provided that their country awards medals reciprocally.

== Classes ==
The classes of the Order of the Lion of Finland are:

- Commander Grand Cross of the Order of the Lion of Finland
- Commander, First Class, of the Order of the Lion of Finland
- Commander of the Order of the Lion of Finland
- Pro Finlandia Medal of the Order of the Lion of Finland (awarded to artists and writers)
- Knight, First Class, of the Order of the Lion of Finland
- Knight of the Order of the Lion of Finland
- Cross of Merit of the Order of the Lion of Finland

== Recipients ==
- (Finland) Risto Ryti (1942)
- (Finland) Aimo Cajander (1942)
- (Finland) Harri Holma (1942)
- (Finland) Gustaf Ignatius (1942)
- (Finland) Lauri Malmberg (1942)
- (Finland) Oskari Mantere (1942)
- (Sweden) Karl Ivan Westman (1942)
- (Hungary) Alajos Béldy, with swords (1942)
- (Germany) Herbert Backe (1942)
- (Germany) Georg Ahrens (1942)
- (Romania) Noti Constantinide (1942)
- (Italy) Vincenzo Cicconardi (1942)
- (Finland) Heikki Renvall (1942)
- (Finland) Aarno Yrjö-Koskinen (1942)
- (Bulgaria) Nicolas Petzeff (1943)
- (Hungary) Alfréd Nickl (1943)
- (Finland) Antti Tulenheimo (1943)
- (Romania) Constantin Pantazi, with swords (1943)
- (Romania) Gheorghe Dobre, with swords (1943)
- (Romania) Ilie Șteflea, with swords (1943)
- (France) Hubert Guerin (1943)
- (Romania) Gheorghe Davidescu (1943)
- (Romania) Alexandru Marcu (1943)
- (Germany) Karl Fiehler (1943)
- (Germany) Hartmann Lauterbacher (1943)
- (Germany) Artur Axmann (1943)
- (Germany) Alexander von Dörnberg (1943)
- (Romania) Octav Ullea (1943)
- (Sweden) Gösta Bagge (1943)
- (Germany) Emil Wiehl (1943)
- (Turkey) Agâh Aksel (1943)
- (Germany) Werner Lorenz (1943)
- (Hungary) Antal Ullein-Reviczky (1943)
- (Finland) G. A. Gripenberg (1943)
- (Finland) Onni Talas (1943)
- (Hungary) Jenő Szinyei Merse (1944)
- (Hungary) Ferenc Szombathelyi, with swords (1944)
- (Hungary) Lajos Csatay, with swords (1944)
- (Sweden) Gustaf Lindström (1944)
- (Sweden) Axel Rappe (1944)
- (Germany) Karl Weisenberger, with swords (1944)
- (Finland) Carl Gustaf Emil Mannerheim, with swords (1944)
- (Finland) Leo Ehrnrooth (1944)
- (Finland) Ernst von Born (1944)
- (Finland) Paavo Hynninen (1944)
- (Finland) Gustaf Idman (1944)
- (Finland) Leonard Grandell, with swords (1945)
- (Finland) Woldemar Hägglund, with swords (1945)
- (Finland) Eino Suolahti, with swords (1945)
- (Finland) Hugo Österman, with swords (1945)
- (Sweden) Vilhelm Assarsson (1945)
- (Spain) José de Palafox, 3rd Duke of Zaragoza (1945)
- (Sweden) Helge Söderbom (1946)
- (Finland) Ilmari Bonsdorff (1946)
- (Finland) Max von Bonsdorff (1946)
- (Finland) Walter Gräsbeck (1946)
- (Finland) Berndt Grönblom (1946)
- (Finland) Wilho Kyttä (1946)
- (Finland) Juho Kusti Paasikivi (1946)
- (Finland) Eero Mäkinen (1946)
- (Finland) Eliel Saarinen (1946)
- (Finland) Eero Rydman (1946)
- (Finland) Ernst Fabian Wrede (1946)
- (Finland) Matti Aura (1946)
- (Finland) Albert von Hellens (1946)
- (Finland) Wäinö Robert Kannel (1946)
- (Finland) John Grundström (1947)
- (Finland) Sigurd Mattsson (1947)
- (Finland) K. A. Paloheimo (1947)
- (Finland) Axel Gylling (1947)
- (Poland) Zygmunt Modzelewski (1948)
- (Poland) Hilary Minc (1948)
- (Finland) Aleksis Ekholm (1948)
- (Finland) Otto Laurila (1948)
- (Finland) Iivari Toivanen (1948)
- (Czechoslovakia) Josef Pavlovský (1949)
- (France) Alfred Jules-Julien (1949)
- (Poland) Jan Wasilewski (1949)
- (Finland) Rainer von Fieandt (1949)
- (Denmark) Hans Fuglsang-Damgaard (1949)
- (Sweden) Armas Järnefelt (1949)
- (Sweden) Gustaf Nobel (1949)
- (Finland) Emil Aaltonen (1949)
- (Finland) E. J. Ahla (1949)
- (Finland) Hjalmar Granfelt (1949)
- (Finland) Oskari Wilho Louhivuori (1949)
- (Argentina) Hipólito Jesús Paz (1949)
- (France) François Coulet (1950)
- (Finland) Archbishop Herman (1950)
- (Finland) Arvo Manner (1950)
- (Finland) Aarne Saarialho (1950)
- (Soviet Union) Grigori Savonenkov (1951)
- (Finland) Wilhelm Wahlforss (1951)
- (Finland) Matti Piipponen (1951)
- (Finland) Oskari Adolf Autio (1952)
- (Finland) Bror Gräsbeck (1952)
- (Finland) Erik von Frenckell (1952)
- (Finland) Vilho Ebeling (1952)
- (Finland) Artturi Ikkala (1952)
- (Finland) Carl Gustaf Möller (1952)
- (Finland) Kyösti Haataja (1953)
- (Norway) Torbjörn Seippel (1953)
- (Finland) Lauri Helenius (1953)
- (Finland) Mikko Louhivaara (1953)
- (Finland) Pekka Myrberg (1953)
- (Finland) Juho Niukkanen (1953)
- (Finland) Artturi Ilmari Virtanen (1953)
- (Finland) Aarne Wuorimaa (1953)
- (Finland) Bruno Kivikoski (1954)
- (Sweden) Marcus Wallenberg Jr. (1954)
- (Finland) Yrjö Hakulinen (1954)
- (Finland) Kaarlo Heiskanen (1954)
- (Finland) Olavi Honka (1954)
- (Finland) Paavo Kekomäki (1954)
- (Finland) Arno Solin (1954)
- (Finland) Alonzo Sundmann (1954)
- (Socialist Federal Republic of Yugoslavia) Slavko Zore (1955)
- (France) Jacques Lecompte-Boinet (1955)
- (Sweden) Svante Påhlson (1955)
- (Italy) Arturo Toscanini (1955)
- (Finland) Rudolf Beckman (1955)
- (Finland) Martti Jaakkola (1955)
- (Finland) Urho Kekkonen (1956)
- (Sweden) Leif Belfrage (1956)
- (Sweden) Torsten Friis (1956)
- (Sweden) Carl Beck-Friis (1956)
- (Sweden) Hugo Cederschiöld (1956)
- (Sweden) Georg Andrén (1956)
- (Sweden) Gustaf Dyrssen (1956)
- (Finland) Onni Okkonen (1956)
- (Finland) Veikko Antero Koskenniemi (1956)
- (Czechoslovakia) Gerard Langer (1957)
- (Finland) Karl-Erik Ekholm (1957)
- (Finland) Eduard Palin (1957)
- (Finland) Paul Fogelberg (1992)
- (Finland) Tony Kakko (2018)
- (Finland) Nils Torvalds (2021)
- (Canada) Tanya Rautava (2023)
- (Finland) Janne Parantainen (2024)
- (United States) Christopher G. Cavoli (2025)
- (Spain) José Manuel Albares (2026)
- (Spain) Camilo Villarino (2026)

== See also ==
- Orders, decorations, and medals of Finland
