= List of ambassadors of Finland to Egypt =

The Finnish government recognized Egypt on 8 April 1922 and diplomatic relations were established. However, no diplomatic mission was established at that point. In January 1942, as the Finnish government took part in the German invasion of the Soviet Union, the Egyptian government broke diplomatic relations with Helsinki.

Diplomatic relations were reestablished on 15 February 1947 at a Legation level, but no diplomatic mission was actually established. In 1954 the Finnish Ambassador to Italy was appointed non-resident Minister Plenipotentiary to Egypt. On 1 July 1959 relations were elevated to Embassy level, and the Finnish Embassy was opened in September.

== Finnish Minister to Egypt (residing in Rome) ==
- Asko Ivalo 1954-1959

== Finnish Ambassadors to Egypt ==
1. Atle Asanti: 1959-1962
2. Osmo Orkomies: 1962-1966
3. Soini Palasto: 1966-1969
4. Pekka Malinen: 1969-1974
5. Joel Pekuri: 1975-1978
6. Björn-Olof Alholm: 1979-1980
7. Olli Auero: 1980-1984
8. Mauri Eggert: 1984-1987
9. Antti Hynninen: 1987-1989
10. Elisabeth Tigerstedt-Tähtelä: 1990-1992
11. Garth Castrén: 1992-1997
12. Aapo Pölhö: 1998-2002
13. Hannes Mäntyvaara: 2002-2005
14. Hannu Halinen: 2005-2009
15. Roberto Tanzi-Albi: 2009–2013
16. Tuula Yrjölä: 2013-2016
17. Laura Kansikas-Debraise: 2017-2021
18. Pekka Korhonen: 2021-present
