= Salmi =

Salmi may refer to:

== Places ==
- Salmi (rural locality), a rural locality (a settlement) in the Republic of Karelia, Russia

== People ==
- Albert Salmi (1928–1990), American actor
- Hazel Salmi (1893–1986), American visual artist, arts administrator
- Jorma Salmi (1933–2016), Finnish ice hockey player and coach
- Samuel Salmi (born 1951), Finnish prelate
- Sulo Salmi (1914–1984), Finnish Swiss orienteering competitor
- Vexi Salmi (1942–2020), Finnish lyricist

== Other ==
- Salmi (architectural material), Korean architectural material
- Salmi, short name for salmagundi, a salad dish originating in England
- Salmis, a rich stew or ragoût of game meat
