= Saara Forsius =

Finnish agronomist, farmer, bank director and politician (1902–1988)

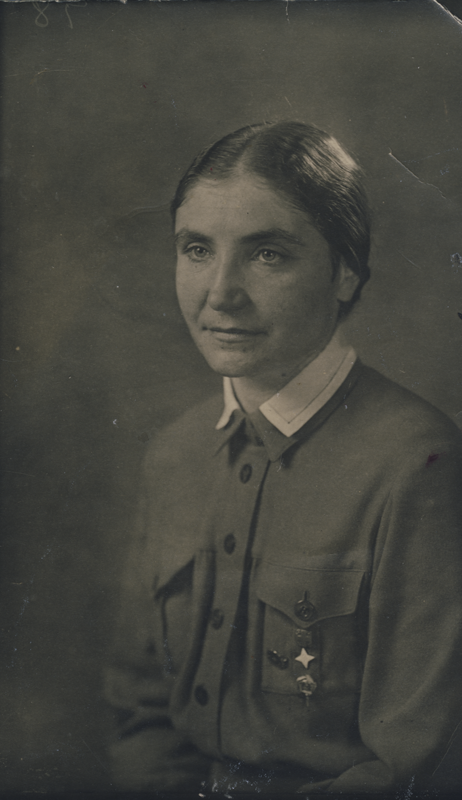
Saara Forsius

Saara Margareta Elisabet Forsius (27 March 1902 – 5 August 1988; née Törnström, surname fennicized in 1906 to Hiidenheimo) was a Finnish agronomist, farmer, bank director and politician, born in Vihti. She began her political career in the Patriotic People's Movement (IKL). She was a member of the Parliament of Finland from 1954 to 1970, representing the National Coalition Party. She was a presidential elector in the 1962 and 1968 presidential elections. Saara Forsius was the daughter of Artturi Hiidenheimo, the granddaughter of Kaarle Ojanen, the niece of Pentti Hiidenheimo and the grandmother of Merikukka Forsius.
