= Kivikoski =

Kivikoski is a Finnish surname. Notable people with the surname include:

- Bruno Kivikoski (1892–1982), Finnish diplomat and lawyer
- Ella Kivikoski (1901–1990), Finnish archaeologist
- Erkko Kivikoski (1936–2005), Finnish film director and screenwriter
