= Kairamo =

Surname list

Kairamo is a surname. Notable people with the surname include:

- Kari Kairamo (1932–1988), Finnish Nokia chairman
- Oswald Kairamo (1858–1938), Finnish politician and botanist
- Päivi Kairamo (born 1964), Finnish diplomat
