= Hiidenheimo =

Surname list

Hiidenheimo is a surname. Notable people with the surname include:

- Artturi Hiidenheimo (1877–1956), Finnish politician
- Pentti Hiidenheimo (1875–1918), Finnish politician
