= Pekuri =

Pekuri is a Finnish surname. Notable people with the surname include:

- Joel Pekuri (1927–1991), Finnish diplomat
- Lauri Pekuri (1916–1999), Finnish flying ace
