= Ruuttu =

Ruuttu is a Finnish surname. Notable people with the surname include:

- Alexander Ruuttu (born 1992), American-born Finnish ice hockey player, son of Christian
- Christian Ruuttu (born 1964), Finnish ice hockey scout and player

== See also ==
- Ruutu
