= Akseli Rauanheimo =

Finnish journalist, writer, diplomat and politician (1871–1932)

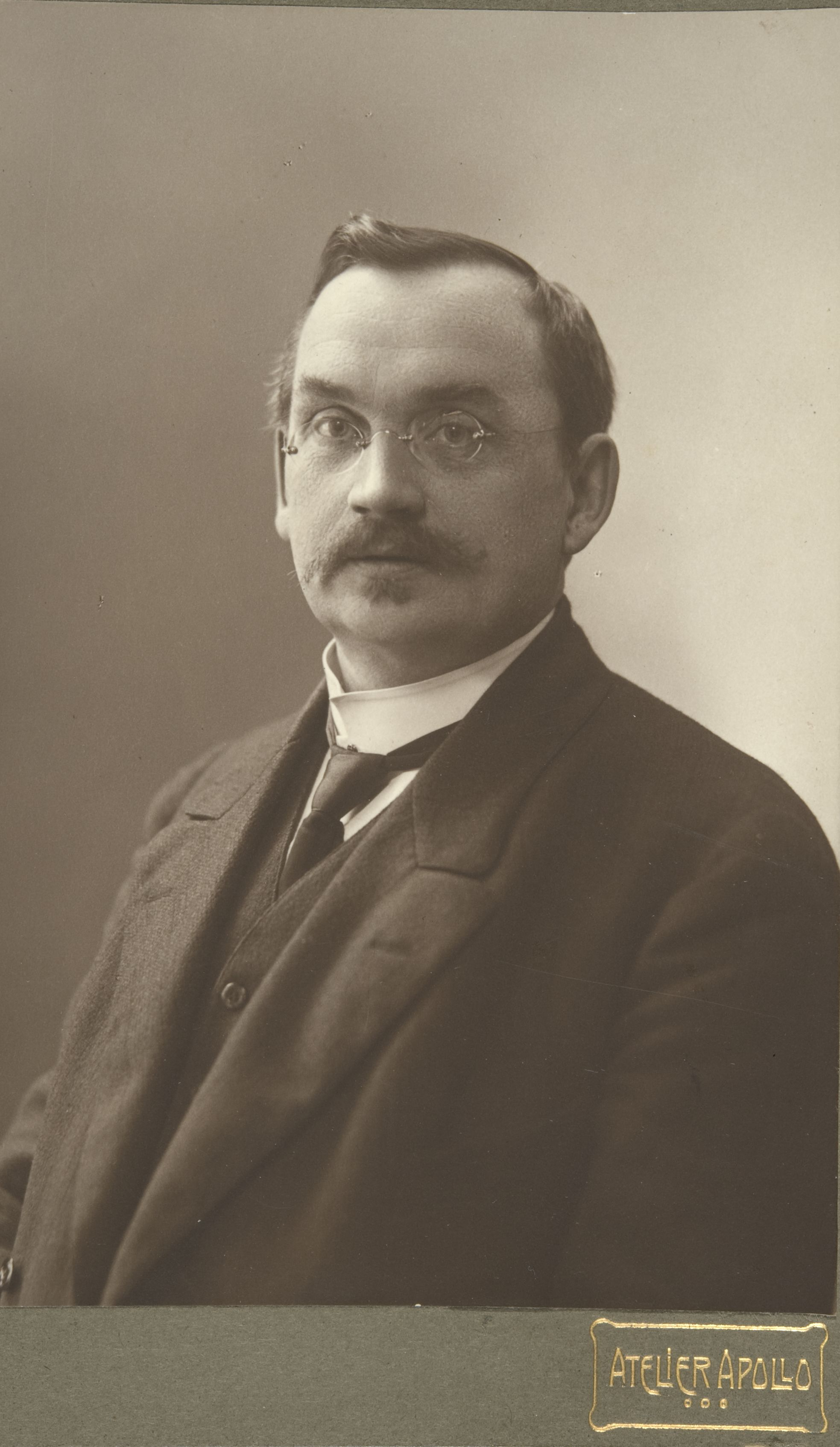
Akseli Rauanheimo

Akseli Kustaa Rauanheimo (27 March 1871 – 19 May 1932; name until 1906 Axel Gustaf Leonard Järnefelt) was a Finnish journalist, writer, diplomat and politician, born in Nurmes. He was a member of the Diet of Finland from 1904 to 1905 and of the Parliament of Finland from 1913 to 1916, representing the Finnish Party. He lived in New York City, U.S., in the 1890s, 1910s and 1920s. From the mid-1920s until his death in Montreal at the age of 61, he lived in Canada.
