= Wuorimaa =

Surname list

Wuorimaa is a Finnish surname. Notable people with the surname include:

- Aarne Wuorimaa (1892–1975), Finnish diplomat and Ambassador, son of Artur
- Artur Wuorimaa (1854–1921), Finnish Lutheran clergyman and politician
