= Malmivaara =

Malmivaara is a Finnish-language surname. Notable people with the surname include:

- Arvi Malmivaara (1885–1970), Finnish Lutheran clergyman and politician
- Laura Malmivaara (born 1973), Finnish actress
- Malla Malmivaara (born 1982), Finnish actress and singer
- Olli Malmivaara (born 1982), Finnish ice hockey player
- Tatu Malmivaara (1908–1987), Finnish Lutheran clergyman and politician
- Väinö Malmivaara (1879–1958), Finnish Lutheran bishop
- Wilhelmi Malmivaara (1854–1922), Finnish Lutheran priest
