= Kataja (disambiguation) =

Kataja is an islet and the easternmost point of Sweden. Kataja is a Finnish word meaning "juniper".

Kataja may also refer to:

== Surname ==
- Kataja (surname)

== Organizations ==
- Kataja BC, a Finnish basketball club
