= Pohjanpalo =

Pohjanpalo is a Finnish surname. Notable people with the surname include:

- Joel Pohjanpalo (born 1994), Finnish football striker
- Tuomas Pohjanpalo (1861–1933), Finnish industrialist and politician
