= Risto Solanko =

Finnish diplomat

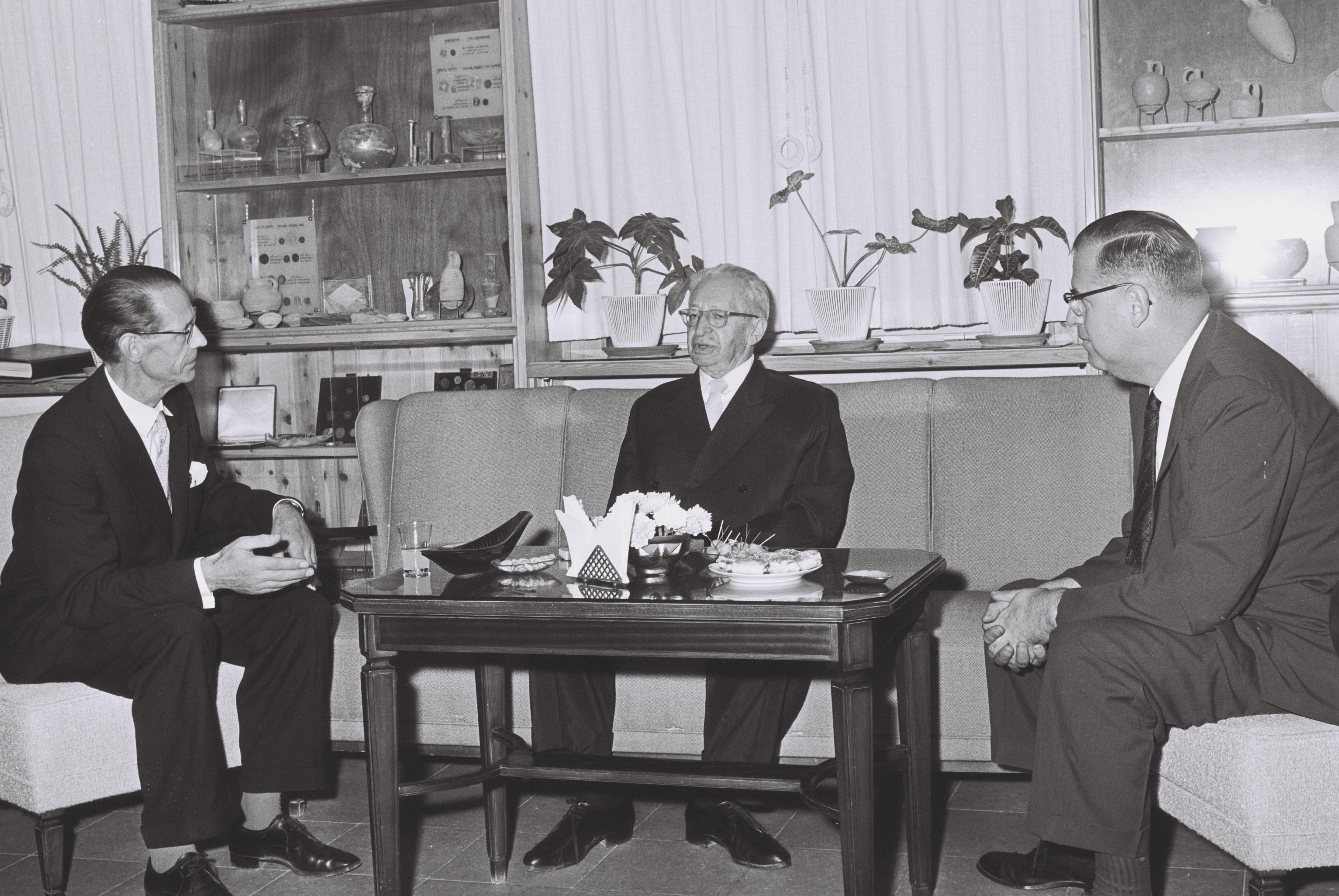
Risto Solanko, Ambassador of Finland to Israel, conversing with president Yitzhak Ben Zvi and Abba Eban, after presenting his credentials to the president.

Risto Solanko (28 July 1901 – 7 May 1980) was a Finnish diplomat. Until 1935 his surname was Sohlman.

Solanko was born in Tampere, and began working for the Ministry for Foreign Affairs in 1929. In the 1930s, he served as a delegation assistant in Buenos Aires, Rio de Janeiro and Oslo, between 1939 and 1944 as secretary of state in Washington, between 1945 and 1952 as head of division in the Ministry of Foreign Affairs and deputy head of department in 1952–1960 as counselor in London and Tel Aviv as chancellor of the 1960s. 1962 and Finnish ambassador to Israel from 1962 to 1964. Solanko retired in 1968

In 1929, Risto Solang married Siljo Ivalo, whose father was writer Santeri Ivalo and brother diplomat Asko Ivalo

Solanko died in Helsinki, aged 78.
