= Finnicization of Helsinki =

Process by which the Finnish language became dominant in Helsinki

The Finnicization of Helsinki is the transformation of Helsinki, Finland from a Swedish-speaking city to one that is bilingual or even multilingual, with Finnish as both the majority language and lingua franca. The dominant aspects of this transition were the influx of Finnish speakers in the process of urbanization, and the shift from Swedish to Finnish among some local Swedish-speaking residents over several generations.

Helsinki was founded by the King Gustav I of Sweden in 1550 as Helsingfors. At the time, Finland was an integral part of post-Kalmar Union Sweden, the surrounding region of Nyland (Uusimaa) was predominantly Swedish-speaking and Swedish was the administrative language of the kingdom.

In the nineteenth century, during the Russian period, Helsinki became the economic and cultural centre of Finland. Beginning from the late 19th century, the Finnish language became more and more dominant in the city, since the people who moved to the city were mostly Finnish-speaking.

At the beginning of the 20th century, the city was already predominantly Finnish-speaking, although with a large Swedish-speaking minority. In the 21st century, native-Swedish speakers are a minority of 5.9%.

== See also ==
- Fennicization
