= Koskenniemi =

Koskenniemi may refer to:

- Heikki Koskenniemi (1919–2013), Finnish scholar (philology)
- Inna Koskenniemi (1923–1995), Finnish professor in the University of Turku
- Kimmo Koskenniemi (born 1945), Finnish professor
- Martti Koskenniemi (born 1953), Finnish lawyer and diplomat
- Matti Koskenniemi (1908–2001), Finnish professor (pedagogy)
- Niilo Koskenniemi (1926–1988), member of the Finnish parliament (SKDL)
- Teodor Koskenniemi (1887–1965), Finnish athlete
- Veikko Antero Koskenniemi (1885–1962), Finnish poet
