= Sirola =

Sirola is a surname. Notable people with the surname include:

- Yrjö Elias Sirola, né Sirén (1876–1936), Finnish socialist politician
- Hannes Juho Rikhard Sirola (1890–1985), Finnish gymnast
- Joseph Anthony Sirola (1929–2019), American actor, director and producer
- Orlando Sirola (1928–1995), Italian tennis player

== See also ==
- Širola, Croatian surname
