= Louhivuori =

Louhivuori is a Finnish surname. Notable people with the surname include:

- Olavi Louhivuori (born 1981), Finnish jazz drummer and composer
- Oskari Wilho Louhivuori (1884–1953), Finnish politician
