= Rautavaara (disambiguation) =

Rautavaara is a municipality of Finland.

Rautavaara or Rautawaara may also refer to:

- Rautavaara Airfield, an airfield in Rautavaara, Finland

== Surname ==
Rautavaara is the Finnicization of the Swedish surname Jernberg, both being ornamental surnames literally meaning "iron mountain/hill"

- Aulikki Rautawaara (1906-1990), Finnish soprano
- Einojuhani Rautavaara (1928–2016), Finnish composer
- Helinä Rautavaara (1929-1998), Finnish explorer, adventurer, collector and journalist
- Tapio Rautavaara (1915–1979), Finnish athlete, singer and actor
- Agneta Rautavaara, protagonist of "Rautavaara's Case", a 1980 science fiction short story by Philip K. Dick
