= Tatu Malmivaara =

Finnish politician (1908–1987)

Arvi Taneli (Tatu) Malmivaara (29 April 1908 - 8 February 1987) was a Finnish Lutheran clergyman and politician. He was a member of the Parliament of Finland from 1945 to 1948, representing the National Coalition Party. He was born in Lapua, the son of Väinö Malmivaara.
