= Paula Ruutu =

Finnish educator and politician (1906–1990)

Hertta Paulina (Paula) Ruutu (27 April 1906 – 17 November 1990; née Gran, which was finnicized to Vannila) was a Finnish educator and politician, born in Värtsilä. She was a member of the Parliament of Finland from 1962 to 1966 and from 1967 to 1970, representing the Agrarian League, which changed its name to Centre Party in 1966. She was a presidential elector in the 1968 Finnish presidential election.
