= Soininen =

Soininen is a Finnish surname. Notable people with the surname include:

- Heidi Soininen (born 1978), maiden name of Heidi Schauman, Finnish economist
- Heikki Soininen (1891–1957), Finnish farmer and politician
- Jani Soininen (born 1972), Finnish ski jumper
- Jaron Soininen, drummer of the South Australian band Universum
- Lauri Soininen (1875–1919), Finnish poet and journalist
- Michael Soininen, guitarist and vocalist of the South Australian band Universum
- Mikael Soininen (1860–1924), Finnish educationist and politician
- Eliel Soisalon-Soininen (1856–1905), Finnish politician
