= Mannermaa =

Mannermaa is a surname. Notable people with the surname include:

- Esko Mannermaa (1916–1975), Finnish actor
- Juho Mannermaa (1871–1943), Finnish politician
- Olli Mannermaa (1921–1998), Finnish architect
- Tuomo Mannermaa (1937–2015), Finnish theologian
