= Tuula Yrjölä =

Finnish diplomat

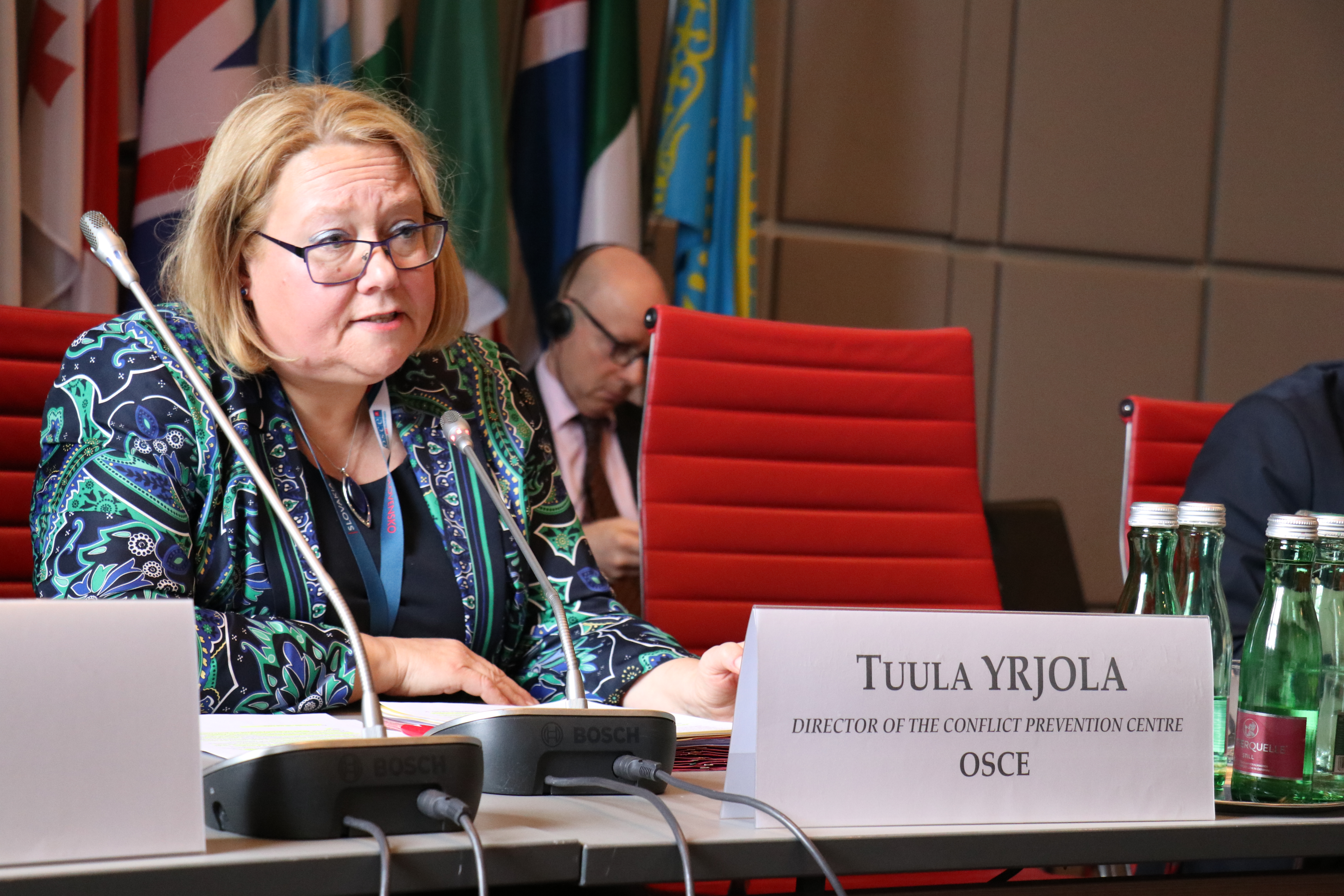

Finland Ambassador to Egypt
- In office 2013–2016

Personal details
- Born: May 14, 1962 (age 63)

Tuula Yrjölä (born 1962) is a Finnish diplomat. She is the Head of the OSCE Office in Tajikistan of the Organization for Security and Cooperation in Europe since 1 October 2016, where she was appointed by the OSCE Presidency in 2016. She was the Ambassador of Finland to Cairo from 2013 to 2016. She started working at the Ministry for Foreign Affairs since 1982.

Yrjölä has previously served as a rotating Ambassador of Central Asia and Head of the Unit for Eastern Europe and Central Asia and served in the Finnish Missions in New York, Moscow and Kyiv.
