= Diocese of Oulu =

Finnish Lutheran diocese

Diocese of Oulu Oulun hiippakunta
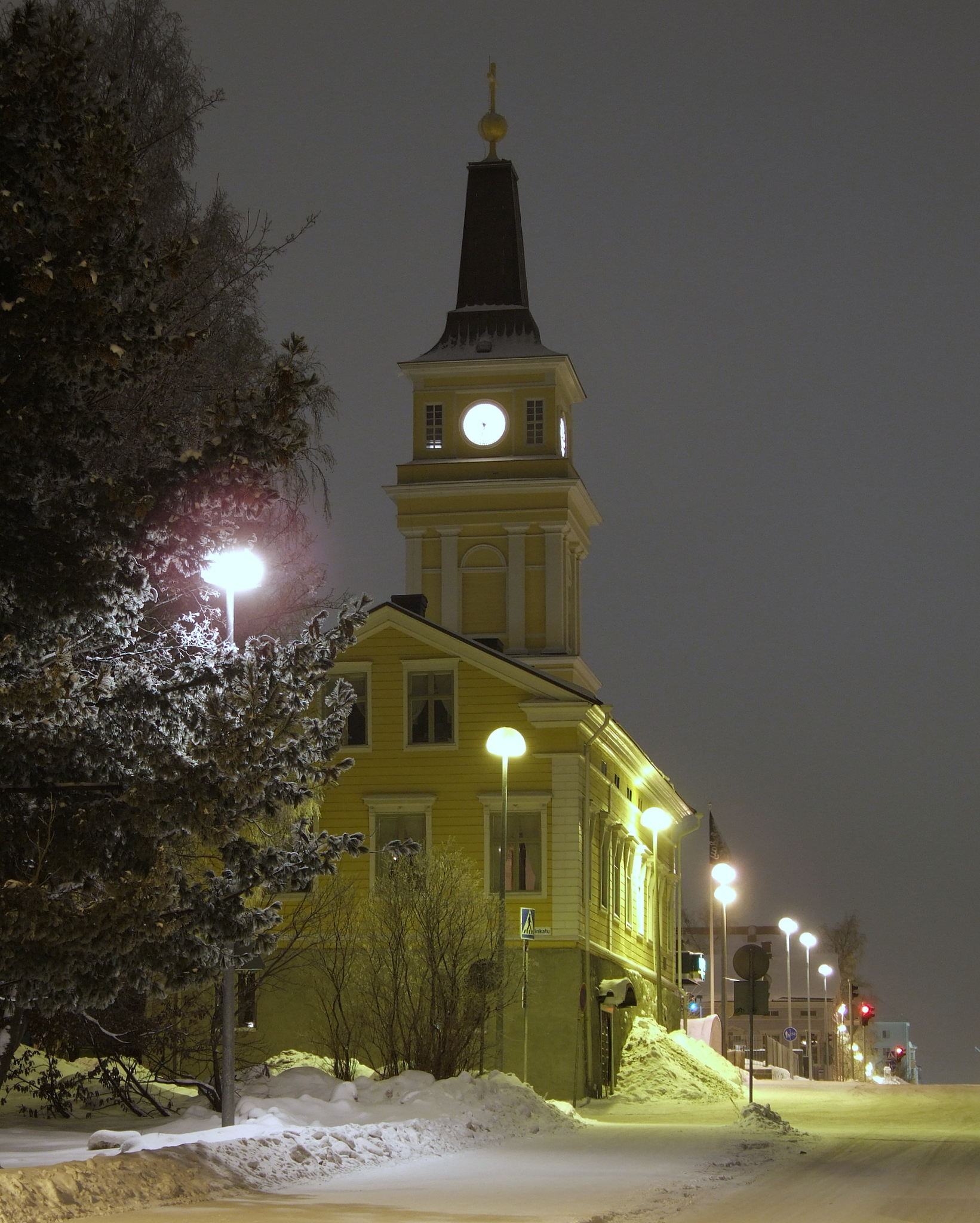
- Tower of the cathedral of Oulu

- Coat of arms

Location
- Country: Finland
- Ecclesiastical province: Turku & Finland
- Metropolitan: Archbishop of Turku & Finland

Statistics
- Parishes: 61
- Members: 503,000

Information
- Denomination: Evangelical Lutheran Church of Finland
- Established: 1851
- Cathedral: Oulu Cathedral

Current leadership
- Bishop: Jukka Keskitalo
- Metropolitan Archbishop: Tapio Luoma

Website
- www.oulunhiippakunta.fi

The Diocese of Oulu (Finnish: Oulun hiippakunta, Swedish: Uleåborgs stift) is a diocese within the Evangelical Lutheran Church of Finland. The diocese was first founded in the town of Kuopio in 1851, but the episcopal see was moved to Oulu in 1900.

== Bishops ==
Bishops of Kuopio

- 1851–1884: Robert Frosterus
- 1885–1897: Gustaf Johansson
- 1897–1899: Otto Immanuel Colliander

Bishops of Oulu

- 1900–1936: Juho Koskimies
- 1936–1943: Juho Mannermaa
- 1943c: Yrjö Wallinmaa
- 1943–1954: Väinö Malmivaara
- 1954–1963: Olavi Heliövaara
- 1963–1965: Leonard Pietari Tapaninen
- 1965–1979: Kaarlo Johannes Leinonen
- 1979–2000: Olavi Rimpiläinen
- 2001–2018: Samuel Salmi
- 2018–present: Jukka Keskitalo

== See also ==
- Evangelical Lutheran Church of Finland
