= Samuel Salmi =

Finnish prelate (born 1951)

The Right Reverend Samuel Salmi
- Bishop of Oulu
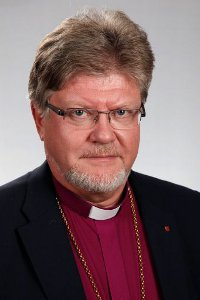
- Church: Evangelical Lutheran Church of Finland
- Elected: 2000
- Installed: 6 January 2001
- Term ended: 1 November 2018
- Predecessor: Olavi Rimpiläinen
- Successor: Jukka Keskitalo

Orders
- Ordination: 1974
- Consecration: 6 January 2001 by Jukka Paarma

Personal details
- Born: 19 March 1951 (age 75) Muonio, Finland
- Spouse: Hannele Salmi
- Children: 2
- Education: University of Helsinki

Samuel Salmi (born 19 March 1951) is a Finnish prelate who was bishop of the Diocese of Oulu from 2001 to 2018.

== Biography ==
Born in Muonio, Salmi graduated from the Faculty of Theology at the University of Helsinki in 1974. He was ordained to the priesthood in Oulu in 1974, after which he completed a pastoral diploma at Oulu Cathedral in 1976. He completed the upper pastoral examination in Oulu Cathedral in 1983. Salmi became a Licentiate of Theology at the University of Helsinki in 1983, where he continued his studies and completed his doctoral thesis in 1990 with his dissertation "One Lord, One Faith, One Baptism". The synod dissertation in the Diocese of Oulu was born in 1984 on "The Baptism Key to the Unity of the Churches". He was a fellow of the World Council of Churches in Geneva in 1976 and 1986. Before becoming bishop, Salmi was parish priest of St. Catherine's Church in Turku from 1993 until 2000. In 2000, he was also the provincial councillor of the Turku Maritime Council.

== Bishop ==
In 2001, he was elected as Bishop of Oulu and succeeded Olavi Rimpiläinen. Unlike his predecessor, Salmi welcomed the female priesthood, and the first female priests of the Oulu Diocese were ordained at his first priestly ordination as bishop. Salmi was the first bishop who was appointed by the Church council rather than the Finnish government as a result of the new constitution that came into force on 1 March 2000, which established a separation between the Evangelical Lutheran Church of Finland and the state. Salmi was one of the candidates nominated for Archbishop of Turku in 2010 and received the fifth-highest number of votes. He retired on 1 November 2018.

== Publications ==
- Yksi Herra, yksi usko, yksi kaste: partisipaatio ajatuksen tulkinnat Faith and Order -liikkeen kastedialogeissa Lundista 1955 Budapestiin 1989 (Thesis) (in Finnish). Helsinki. 1990.
- Puhu, pohjoinen, puhu, Pohjan väylä (in Finnish). Pello: Pohjan väylä. 2002. ISBN 978-952-52-7109-6.
- Article in Helenius, Timo, ed. (2007). Meille Annettu Maa: Pohjoisen kirkon ympäristökirja (in Finnish). Helsinki: Edita Publishing. ISBN 978-951-37-4867-8.
- Kuule pohjoista puhetta (in Finnish). Edita Publishing. 2008. ISBN 978-951-37-5308-5.

== Family ==
- Salmi is married to Hannele Salmi née Zeitlinger. He has a son, Mikko Salmi (a Lutheran pastor, musician, and singer), and a daughter, Johanna Salmi.

Preceded by Olavi Rimpiläinen	Bishop of Oulu; 2001–2018	Succeeded by Jukka Keskitalo
