= Koskelo =

Koskelo is a Finnish surname. Notable people with the surname include:

- Juho Koskelo (1870–1942), Finnish-American singer and cellist
- Kaarlo Koskelo (1888–1953), Finnish wrestler
- Pauliine Koskelo (born 1956), President of the Supreme Court of Finland
- Roosa Koskelo, Finnish volleyball player
