= Meriluoto =

Meriluoto is a surname. Notable people with the surname include:

- Aila Meriluoto (1924–2019), Finnish poet, writer, and translator
- Johan Meriluoto (born 1974), Finnish jumper
- Kai Meriluoto (born 2003), Finnish footballer
- Minna Meriluoto (born 1985), Finnish football goalkeeper
- Päivi Meriluoto (born 1955), Finnish archer
