= Juho Koskelo =

Finnish-American musician (1870–1942)

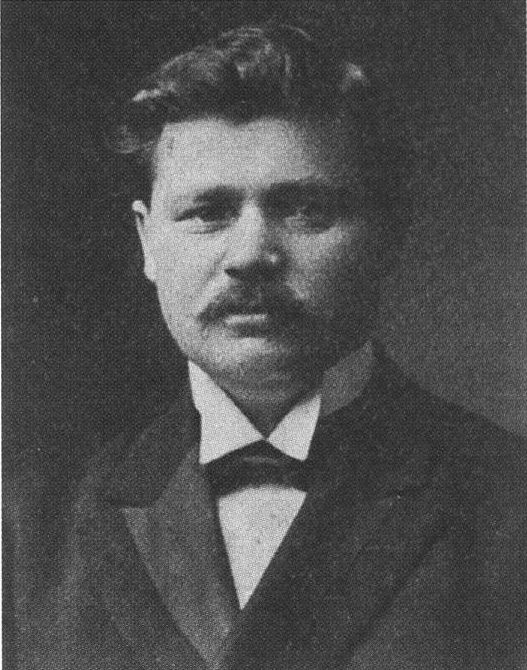
- Juho Koskelo in the 1910s.

Background information
- Birth name: Juho Evert Koskelo
- Born: July 23, 1870; Kuopio, Finland
- Died: November 7, 1942 (aged 72); New York City
- Genres: Folk music, schlager music
- Occupation: Singer
- Instrument: Vocals
- Years active: 1910s and 1920s
- Labels: His Master's Voice, Victor Talking Machine Company, Columbia Records, Gramophone Company

Juho Evert Koskelo (also known as John Koskelo, July 23, 1870 – November 7, 1942), was a Finnish-American singer and cellist. He was the most popular Finnish-American singer in the 1910s.

Koskelo, who was born in Kuopio, started his career as a military musician and later played with the Berlin Philharmonic. In Berlin he met Heikki Klemetti, who suggested that he go to America. Koskelo gave his first American performance in Calumet, Michigan in 1910, after which he toured, singing in Finnish and German. He moved to New York City later in 1910 and immediately started to make recordings for His Master's Voice, Columbia Records, the Victor Talking Machine Company, the Gramophone Company, and Edison Records. As a singer, he made at least 112 recordings between 1910 and 1923; among them were 8 issued as Edison Blue Amberol cylinders. Mostly he sang folk songs, marches, hymns and industrial folk music. Some of his songs were written by the famous cuplé singer J. Alfred Tanner.

Koskelo's career ended because of a stroke in 1923, and he died as a forgotten artist at a hospital in New York in 1942.
