= Vennamo =

Surname list

Vennamo is a Finnish surname. Notable people with the surname include:

- Pekka Vennamo (1944–2026), Finnish politician
- Veikko Vennamo (1913–1997), Finnish politician
