= Kuusi =

Kuusi is a Finnish surname. Notable people with the surname include:

- Janne Kuusi (born 1954), Finnish television and film director, screenwriter, producer and occasional actor
- Kim Kuusi (born 1947), Finnish composer
- Matti Kuusi (1914–1998), Finnish folklorist, paremiographer and paremiologist
- Pekka Kuusi (1917–1989), Finnish social scientist and politician
