= Hugo Rautapää =

Finnish politician

Hugo Rautapää (28 February 1874 – 9 July 1922) was a Finnish politician. He was a member of the Senate of Finland.
