= Arvelo =

Arvelo is a surname. Notable people with the surname include:

- Alberto Arvelo Torrealba (1905–1971), Venezuelan lawyer, educator, and poet
- Aurora Arvelo (born 2003), Finnish rhythmic gymnast
- Enriqueta Arvelo Larriva (1886–1963), Venezuelan poet
- Gremlis Arvelo, Venezuelan table tennis player
- Ritva Arvelo (1921–2013), Finnish actress, film director, screenwriter, and dancer
