= Oulu Cathedral =

Cathedral in Oulu, Finland

Oulu Cathedral Oulun tuomiokirkko Uleåborgs domkyrka
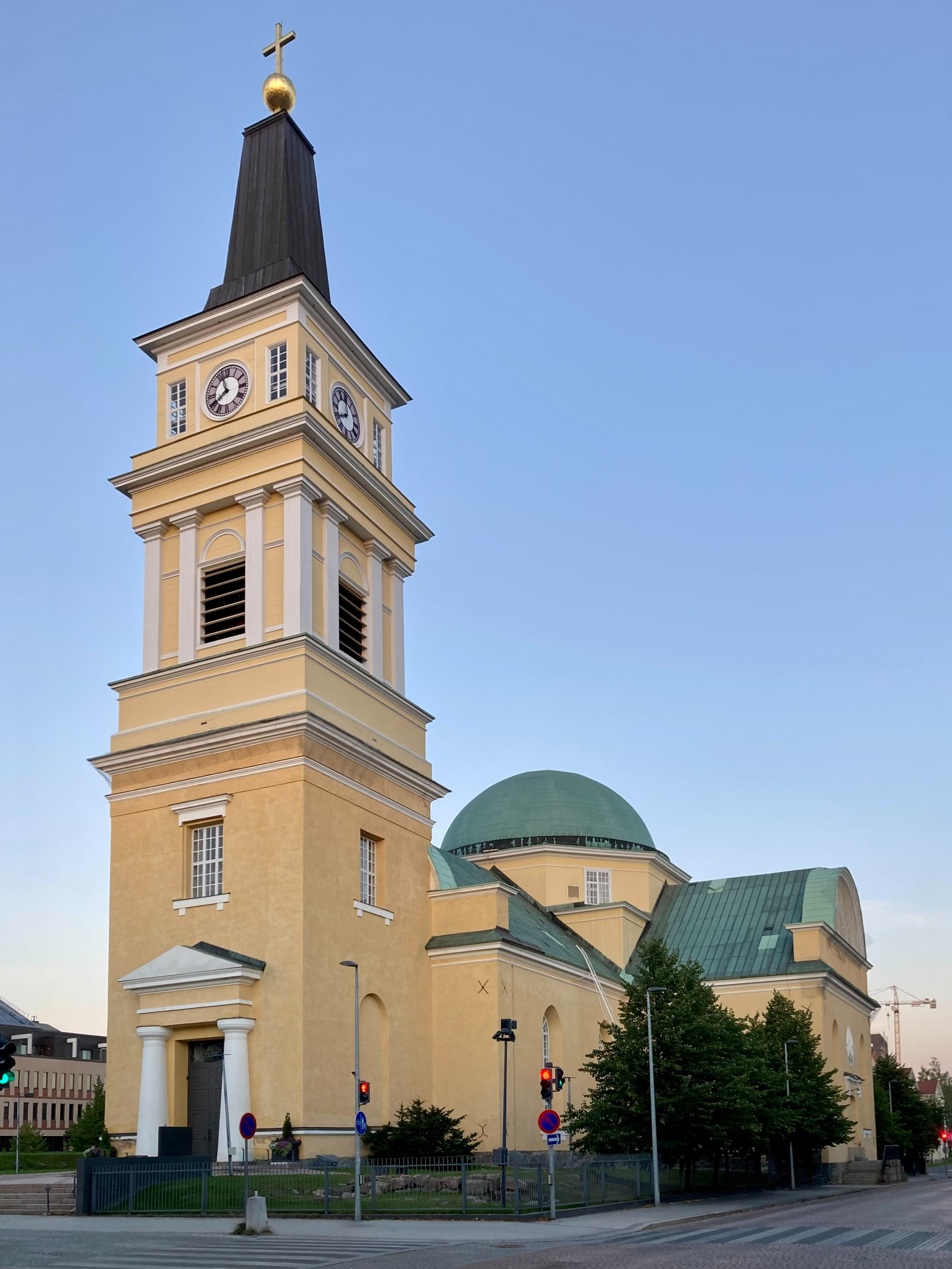
- Oulu Cathedral seen from west

Religion
- Affiliation: Evangelical Lutheran Church of Finland
- District: Diocese of Oulu
- Ecclesiastical or organizational status: Cathedral

Location
- Location: Oulu, Finland
- Interactive map of Oulu Cathedral; Oulun tuomiokirkko Uleåborgs domkyrka
- Coordinates: 65°00′53″N 025°28′33″E

Architecture
- Architects: Originally Daniel Hagman and later altered by Carl Ludvig Engel
- Type: Cathedral
- Style: Neoclassical
- Completed: 1777

Specifications
- Capacity: Seats 2,400
- Dome: 1
- Spire: 1
- Spire height: 56.5 m (185 ft)

Website
- www.oulunseurakunnat.fi

Oulu Cathedral (Finnish: Oulun tuomiokirkko, Swedish: Uleåborgs domkyrka) is an Evangelical Lutheran cathedral and the seat of the Diocese of Oulu, located in the center of Oulu, Finland. The church was built in 1777 as a tribute to the king of Sweden Gustav III and named after his wife as Sofia Magdalena's church.

The wooden structures burned in the large fire of the city of Oulu in 1822. The church was built again on top of the old stone walls, with famous architect Carl Ludvig Engel as the designer. The restoration works were completed in 1832, but the belfry was not erected until 1845.

The most notable work of art in the cathedral is the portrait of Johannes Messenius, painted in 1611.
