= Niilo Orasmaa =

Finnish diplomat

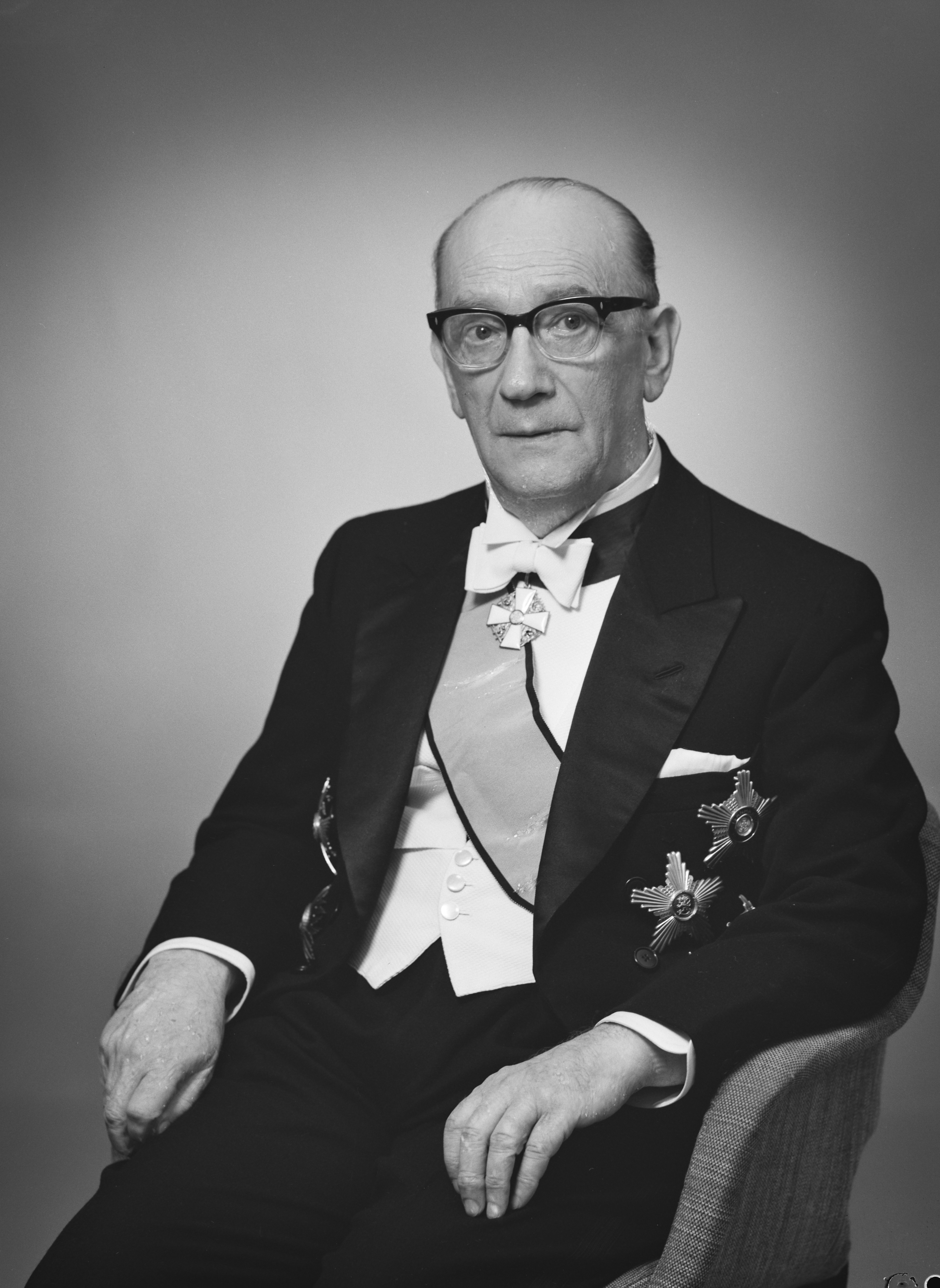
Niilo Orasmaa in 1963.

Niilo Yrjö Gideon Orasmaa, last name until 1906 Österman (13 July 1889, Tampere – 9 September 1970, Helsinki), was a Finnish diplomat.

Orasmaa's parents were the merchant Mauritz Alexander Österman and Mathilda Sofia Wennerblom. He graduated in 1908 and graduated as a Master of Philosophy in 1924.

Orasmaa has been employed by the Ministry of Foreign Affairs since 1921. He was Secretary of State in Tallinn from 1925 to 1928, Deputy Head of Political and Commercial Affairs in 1928 and Vice President of Political Affairs. 1929, in Madrid and Lisbon 1929–1933, Deputy Head of Trade Policy Department in 1933, and Head of Economic Policy Department 1933–1937. He was also Secretary of Trade Committees of 1922–1924, 1929 and 1933–1937.

Orasmaa was an Envoy to Buenos Aires, Montevideo and Santiago in 1937–1945, in Rio de Janeiro from 1946 to 1950 and in Belgrade and Athens in 1953–1956. From 1951 to 1953, he served as the post of Head of the Political Department of the Ministry of Foreign Affairs.

Niilo Orasmaa's Manuscript Collection is located in the library of the University of Tampere
