= Nuorteva =

Surname list

Nuorteva is a surname. Notable people with the surname include:

- Kerttu Nuorteva (1912–1963), Soviet intelligence agent
- Santeri Nuorteva (1881–1929), Finnish-born Soviet journalist
