= Päivi Kairamo =

Finnish diplomat and civil servant

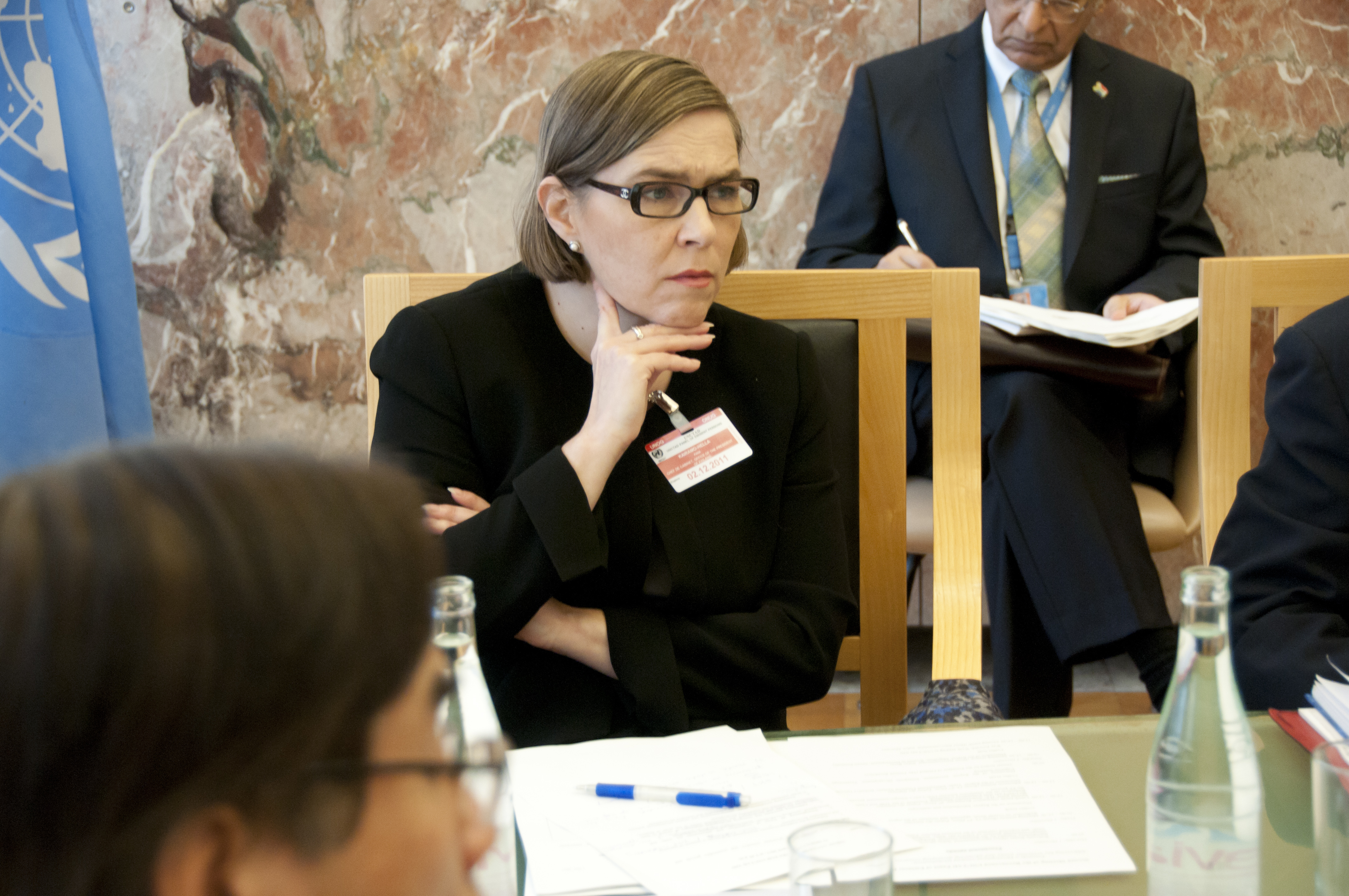
Päivi Kairamo

Päivi Kairamo (former Kairamo-Hella, born 10 April 1964) is a Finnish diplomat and civil servant. She has been working as Head of the United Nations Permanent Representation to Geneva from 1 July 2012.

Kairamo was appointed as Finland's ambassador to Turkey on 1 September 2016

Kairamo is a Bachelor of Law degree by education.

She graduated from the University of Helsinki in 1990 and started her career at the Ministry of Labor in 1991. Kairamo worked as a government secretary in the Ministry until 1995. At the Ministry for Foreign Affairs, Kairamo worked as a commercial council in 1995-1997 and 1998 and in Parliament as Committee on Social Affairs and Health 1997.

Between 1998 and 2000, Kairamo served as a specialist in Finland's permanent EU delegation. She worked as a European Commission official for 2000–2005. Kairamo was the Foreign Policy Advisor to the President of the Republic of Finland 2005-2009 and at the Office of the President 2009–2012.

Kairamo is a Social Democrat.

Kairamo's father was Aimo Kairamo's former editor-in-chief of the Finnish Social Democrat newspaper.
