= Talvela =

Talvela is a Finnish surname. Notable people with the surname include:

- Martti Talvela (1935–1989), Finnish operatic bass
- Paavo Talvela (1897–1973), Finnish soldier
