= Aare Leikola =

Finnish engineer and politician (1893–1973)

Aare Victor Leikola (29 April 1893, in Artjärvi – 21 June 1973; surname until 1906 Leidenius) was a Finnish engineer, business executive and politician.

== Political career ==
He was a member of the Parliament of Finland from 1951 to 1958, representing the People's Party of Finland. He subsequently joined the Liberal League and when the Liberal League and the People's Party of Finland merged in 1965 to form the Liberal People's Party, he founded the Independence Party (Itsenäisyyspuolue), which took part in the parliamentary elections of 1966 without winning any seats. Leikola was the chairman of the Independence Party from 1965 to 1969.

== Personal life ==
He was the elder brother of Erkki Leikola.
