= Ruutu =

Origin
- Meaning: square, diamond, box
- Region of origin: Finland

Other names
- Variant form: Ruuttu

Ruutu is a Finnish surname. It means 'square', 'diamond', or 'box' (wikt:ruutu).

People with the surname Ruutu include:

In sports:

- Jarkko Ruutu (born 1975), Finnish professional ice hockey player, brother of Mikko and Tuomo
- Mikko Ruutu (born 1978), Finnish professional ice hockey player
- Tuomo Ruutu (born 1983), Finnish professional ice hockey player

In other fields:

- Paula Ruutu (1906 - 1990), Finnish educator and politician
- Yrjö Ruutu (1887 – 1956), Finnish professor of political sciences

== See also ==
- Christian Ruuttu (born 1964), retired Finnish professional ice hockey player
- Ruutu.fi, a Finnish television streaming service operated by Nelonen Media
