= Paasikivi (surname) =

Paasikivi (literally "flat boulder; flagstone") is a Finnish family name. Notable people with the surname include:

- Alli Paasikivi (1879–1960), Finnish benefactor and second wife of president Juho Kusti Paasikivi
- Annikki Paasikivi (1898–1950), Finnish architect
- Juho Kusti Paasikivi (1870–1956), Finnish politician
- Lilli Paasikivi (born 1965), Finnish mezzo-soprano
