= Kalliala =

Kalliala is a Finnish surname. Notable people with the surname include:

- Aake Kalliala (born 1950), Finnish actor
- Kaarlo Kalliala (born 1952), Finnish theologian and Bishop
