= Rislakki =

Rislakki is a Finnish surname. Notable people with the surname include:

- Eero Rislakki (1924–2017), Finnish industrial engineer
- Jukka Rislakki (born 1945), Finnish journalist, non-fiction writer, and political cartoonist
