= Merikanto =

Merikanto is a Finnish surname. It may refer to:

- Oskar Merikanto (1868–1924), Finnish composer
- Aarre Merikanto (1893–1958), his son, also a composer
- Ukri Merikanto (1950–2010), Aarre's son, sculptor
