= Eduard Palin =

Finnish diplomat

Eduard Hjalmar Palin (27 January 1891 – 18 March 1969) was a Finnish diplomat.

Palin was born in Helsinki, the son of Hanjar Georg Palin and Linnéa Eugenie Hisinger. He graduated in 1909 and passed his degree in 1917.

Palin served as secretary of the Foreign Ministry in 1920, the second embassy secretary of the Paris delegation from 1920 to 1921, as secretary in Berlin from 1921 to 1925, a Counselor in Copenhagen from 1925 to 1927, Chargé d'Affaires in 1925–1926. He was then Deputy Head of General Affairs in 1927-1929 and Political Affairs Division as Deputy Head of Government in 1929-1931 and Chief in 1931–1933.

After that Palin served as envoy in Riga and Kaunas from 1933 to 1940, in Bucharest from 1941 to 1945 and as an envoy to Prague and Vienna from 1947 to 1950 and as envoy and ambassador to Oslo in 1950–1958. Palin received the title of Counselor in 1924 and the Special Envoy and the Plenipotentiary of 1933.
