= Sillanpää =

Sillanpää (meaning "bridge's end") is a Finnish surname. Notable people with the surname include:

- Miina Sillanpää (1866–1952), Finnish politician, first female Finnish minister
- Rosa Sillanpää (1888–1929), Finnish trade union activist and politician
- Frans Eemil Sillanpää (1888–1964), Finnish writer
- Jari Sillanpää (born 1965), Finnish singer
- Sanna Sillanpää (born 1968), killed three men and wounded another in the Albertinkatu shootings

== Other meanings ==
- 1446 Sillanpää, asteroid named after Frans Emil Sillanpää
