= Virkkunen =

Virkkunen is a surname. Notable people with the surname include:

- Carita Virkkunen (born 1962), known as Mona Carita, Finnish singer
- Henrik Virkkunen (1917–1963), Finnish organizational theorist and Professor of Accounting
- Janne Virkkunen (born 1948), Finnish journalist
- Paavo Virkkunen (1874–1959), Finnish politician
- Valtteri Virkkunen (born 1991), Finnish ice-hockey forward
