= Jernberg =

Jernberg is a Swedish surname, Swedish ornamental surname literally meaning "iron mountain/hill" Notable people with the surname include:

- August Jernberg (1826–1896), Swedish artist
- Ingemar Jernberg (born 1950), Swedish athlete
- Michael Jernberg (born 1963), Swedish racing driver
- Olof Jernberg (1855–1935), German landscape and marine painter
- Sixten Jernberg (1929–2012), Swedish cross-country skier
- Sofia Jernberg (born 1983), Swedish opera singer

== See also ==
- Rautavaara (disambiguation)
