= Juho Mannermaa =

Finnish Lutheran bishop and politician (1871–1943)

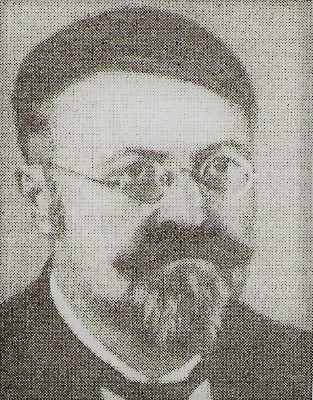
Juho Mannermaa

Johan Abram (Juho Abraham, J. A.) Mannermaa (29 May 1871 – 6 February 1943; surname until 1906 Mennander) was a Finnish Lutheran bishop and politician, born in Rantsila. He was a member of the Diet of Finland from 1905 to 1906 and of the Parliament of Finland from 1911 to 1916, representing the Finnish Party and from 1922 to 1927, representing the National Coalition Party. He was a presidential elector in the 1931 Finnish presidential election. He was the bishop of the Diocese of Oulu from 1936 until his death in 1943.
