= Ahtisaari =

Ahtisaari is a surname. It may refer to:

- Eeva Ahtisaari (born 1936), Finnish teacher and historian, the First Lady of Finland from 1994 to 2000
- Marko Ahtisaari (born 1969), Finnish technology entrepreneur and musician
- Martti Ahtisaari (1937–2023), Finnish politician, the tenth President of Finland (1994–2000)

== See also ==
- Ahtisaari Plan
