= Oskar Hainari =

Finnish politician and journalist

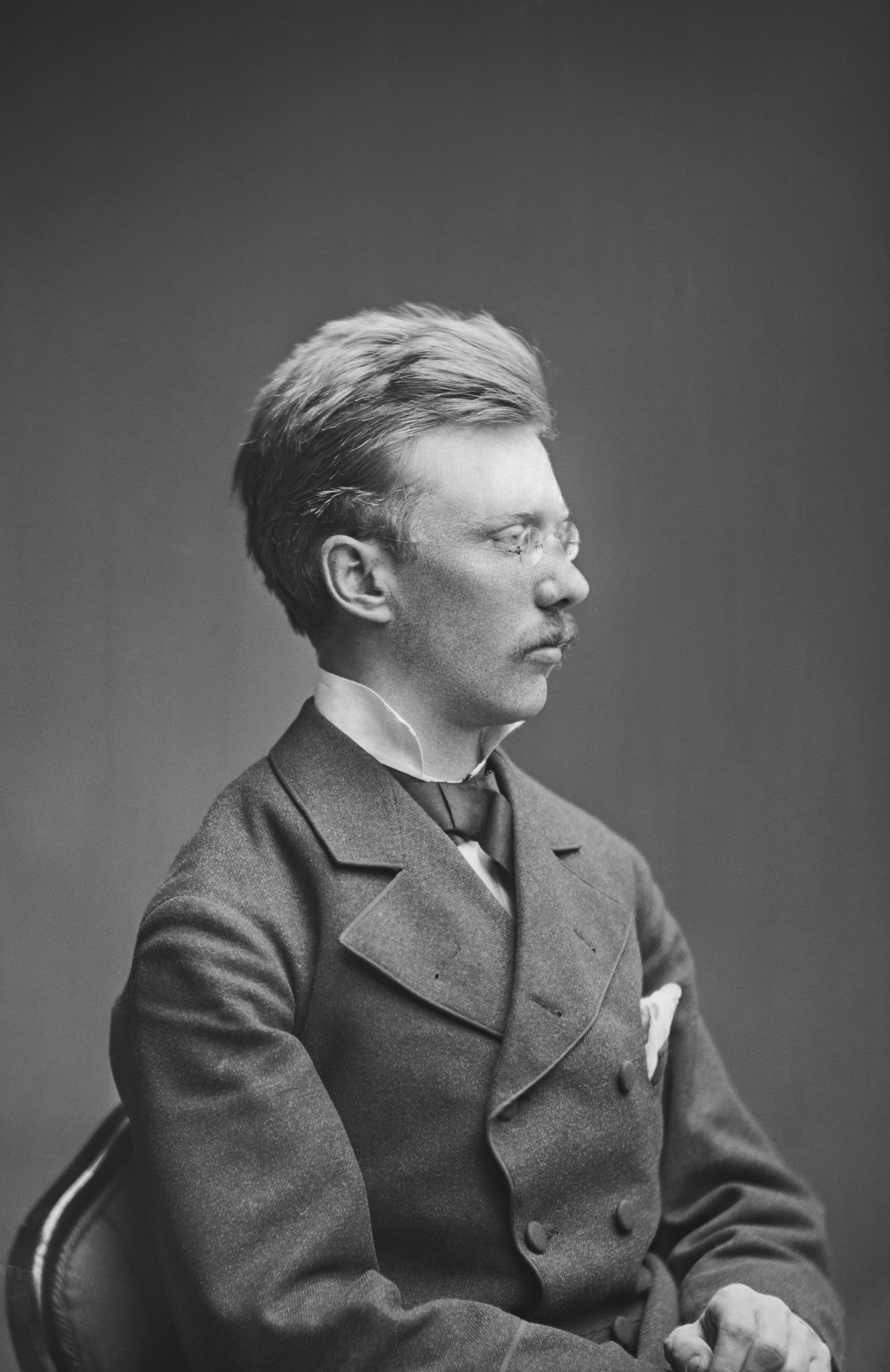
Oskar Hainari

Oskar Adolf Hainari (7 March 1856 – 23 January 1910; surname until 1906 Forsström) was a Finnish secondary school teacher, journalist and politician, born in Tohmajärvi. He was a Member of the Diet of Finland in 1899, in 1900 and from 1904 to 1905 and a Member of the Parliament of Finland from 1908 until his death in 1910, representing the Finnish Party.
