= Salmi (architectural material) =

Concept in Korean architecture

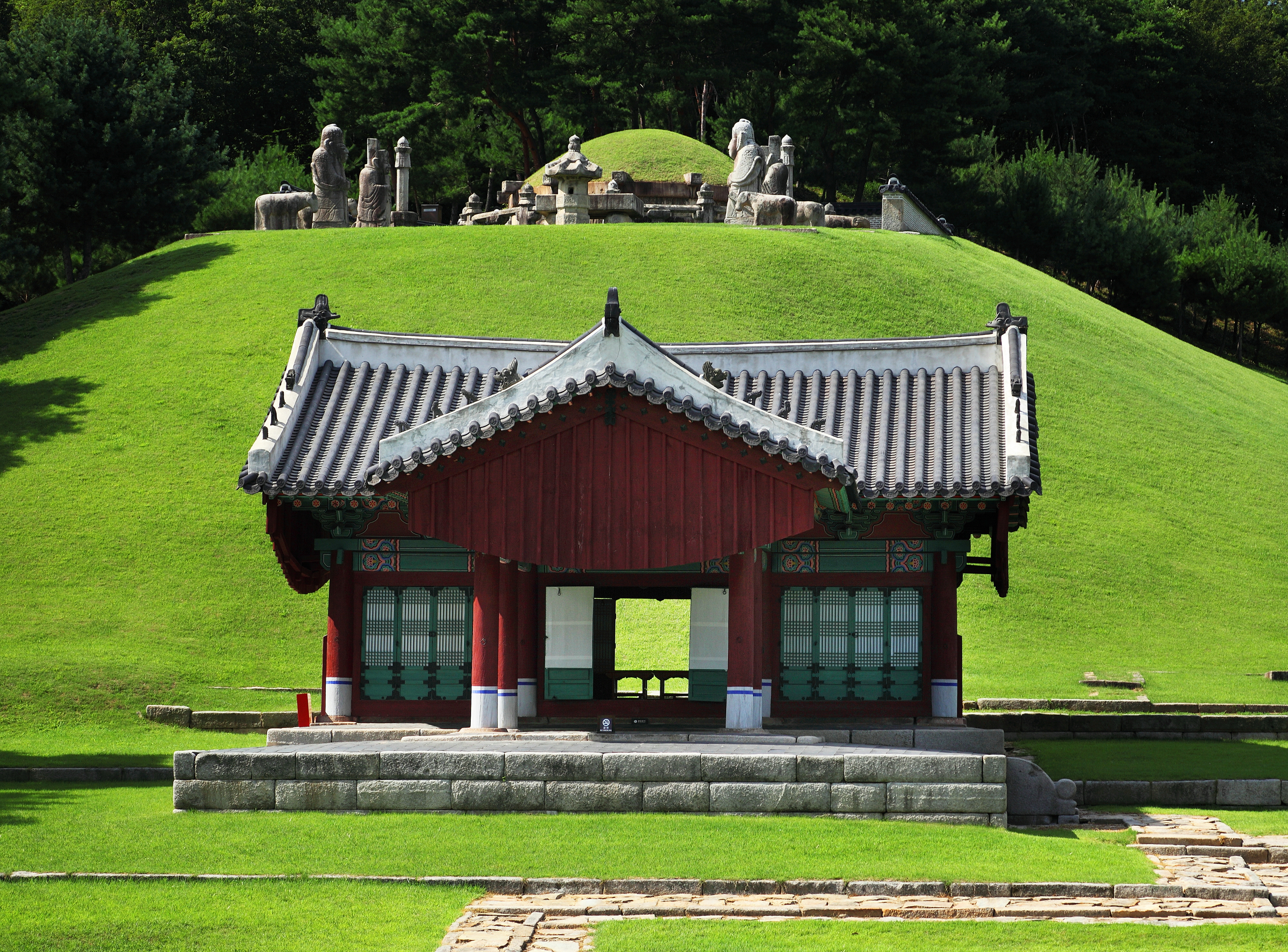
Ritual House at Mongneung Royal Tomb, Guri

Salmi (Korean: 살미; Hanja: 山彌) is a concept in traditional Korean architecture. It is a long rectangular cross-section member that is installed overlapping in the direction of the beam on top of the main head among the members that make up the bracket.

== History ==
Salmi is written as '沙乙尾' or '山彌' in Yeonggeon Uigwe (영건의궤) of the Joseon Dynasty. It was first used at least since the Three Kingdoms of Korea, and changed into various forms over time. From the Three Kingdoms period to the North-South States period, salmi was generally in the bridgehead type, which was made by cutting the tip straight along with the tip and cutting the lower part into a curve.

During the Goryeo, changes began to occur in the form of salmi, and during the Joseon, it appeared in various forms.

== Characteristic ==
Salmi is connected with a half-beam at a right angle to the ridge. The Ritual House at Mongneung Royal Tomb (구리 동구릉 목릉 정자각) is a building that has maintained its original appearance since it was built in 1630 (the 8th year of King Injo’s reign), and is the only building with a multi-eave style among the Jeongjagak of the Joseon royal tombs. It reflects the situation before the form and structure of salmi were decorated, so it has great historical, academic, and artistic value.
