= Paloheimo =

Paloheimo is a Finnish surname. Notable people with the surname include:

- Eero Paloheimo (born 1936), Finnish artist and politician
- Hjalmar Gabriel Paloheimo (1864–1919), Finnish industrialist and founder of the H. G. Paloheimo Oy company
- Laura Paloheimo (born 1971), Finnish author
- Maila Paloheimo (1910–1989), Finnish teacher and author
- Oiva Paloheimo (1910–1973), Finnish author and poet
- Veli Paloheimo (born 1967), Finnish tennis player
