= Niinistö =

Niinistö is a Finnish surname. Notable people with the surname include:

- Jussi Niinistö (born 1970), Finnish politician and historian
- Sauli Niinistö (born 1948), President of Finland from 2012 to 2024
- Ville Niinistö (born 1976), Finnish politician
