= Pohjanpää =

Pohjanpää is a Finnish surname. Notable people with the surname include:

- Elina Pohjanpää (1933–1996), Finnish actress
- Arvi Pohjanpää (1887–1959), Finnish gymnast, judge, and writer
