= Linkola =

Linkola is a Finnish surname. Notable people with the surname include:

- Anna-Liisa Linkola (1914–1999), Finnish politician
- Jukka Linkola (born 1955), Finnish jazz pianist and classical composer
- Kaarlo Linkola (1888–1942), Finnish botanist
- Pentti Linkola (1932–2020), Finnish environmentalist, philosopher and writer
