= Širola =

Širola is a surname. Notable people with the surname include:

- Božidar Širola (1889–1956), Croatian composer and musicologist
- Dorjana Širola (born 1972), Croatian female quizzer, linguist, and anglicist
