= Sotamaa =

Sotamaa is a surname. Notable people with the surname include:

- Antero Sotamaa (born 1940), Finnish sailor
- Yrjö Sotamaa (born 1942), Finnish designer and design strategist
