= Paasilinna =

- Language: Finnish

Origin
- Meaning: "stone fortress", derived from paasi ("stone") and linna ("fortress")
- Region of origin: Finland

Paasilinna is a Finnish surname meaning "stone-made stronghold" or "stone fortress". Notable people with the surname include:

- Arto Paasilinna (1942–2018), Finnish writer
- Erno Paasilinna (1935–2000), Finnish writer
- Reino Paasilinna (1939–2022), Finnish politician
