= Lehto =

Lehto is a Finnish surname of Laine type literally meaning "grove". Notable people with the surname include:

- Arlene Ione Lehto, American politician and businesswoman
- JJ Lehto, Finnish racing car driver
- Joni Lehto, Finnish ice hockey player
- Katja Lehto, Finnish ice hockey player
- Leevi Lehto, Finnish poet, translator, and programmer
- Olli Lehto, Finnish mathematician
- Pekka Lehto, Finnish film director
- Petteri Lehto, Finnish ice hockey player
- Rami Lehto, Finnish politician
- Reino Ragnar Lehto, Finnish politician
- Seppo Lehto, Finnish activist
