= Heikki Kalha =

Finnish diplomat (1931–1994)

Heikki Sakari Kalha (formerly Kronqvist, 1 September 1931 – 10 November 1994) was a Finnish diplomat and a varatuomari.

Heikki Kalha was born and died in Helsinki. He graduated from Tyrvä co-school in 1950, obtained his Bachelor of Law degree from the University of Helsinki in 1957, and received his Master's degree in 1960. After studying from 1958 to 1959, he was employed by the Ministry for Foreign Affairs at the Tyrvä court notary.

Kalha served as Assistant at the Finnish Embassy in Finland in 1960, as Secretary of State for Foreign Affairs between 1963 and 1964, as Secretary of State in Madrid between 1964 and 1967 and in Tokyo from 1967 to 1969, and as Chancellor and Office Manager at the Ministry for Foreign Affairs between 1969 and 1974. He served as Ambassador of Finland to Beirut from 1974 to 1977 and at the same time in Amman and Kuwait, then in Athens from 1977 to 1980, in Bonn from 1980 to 1985, then as a negotiating officer for the Ministry of Foreign Affairs from 1985 to 1988 and again served as Ambassador in Madrid 1988–1990 and Tokyo 1990–1994.
