= Gabriel Hirvensalo =

A.K.A Gabriel Lagus, Finnish farmer and politician (1880-1941)

Johan Gabriel Hirvensalo (6 January 1880, Iisalmi - 18 October 1941; surname until 1903 Lagus) was a Finnish farmer, civil servant and politician. He was a member of the Parliament of Finland, representing the Young Finnish Party from 1913 to 1917 and the National Progressive Party from 1922 to 1924.
