= Elisabeth Tigerstedt-Tähtelä =

Finnish diplomat

Elisabeth Tigerstedt-Tähtelä (born 1933) is a Finnish diplomat. She is a Master in lawyer and has been Finnish Ambassador to several countries

Tigerstedt-Tähtelä has been Finnish Ambassador to Vietnam from 1988 to 1989, and in Cairo, Egypt from 1990 to 1992 and in Zagreb, Croatia from 1997 to 1998

Tigerstedt-Tähtelä retired from post of Ambassador to Croatia in autumn 1998 and has subsequently worked for the Committee on the Rights of the Child (during the four-year term from 1999 to 2003.
