= Osmo Orkomies =

Finnish diplomat and lawyer

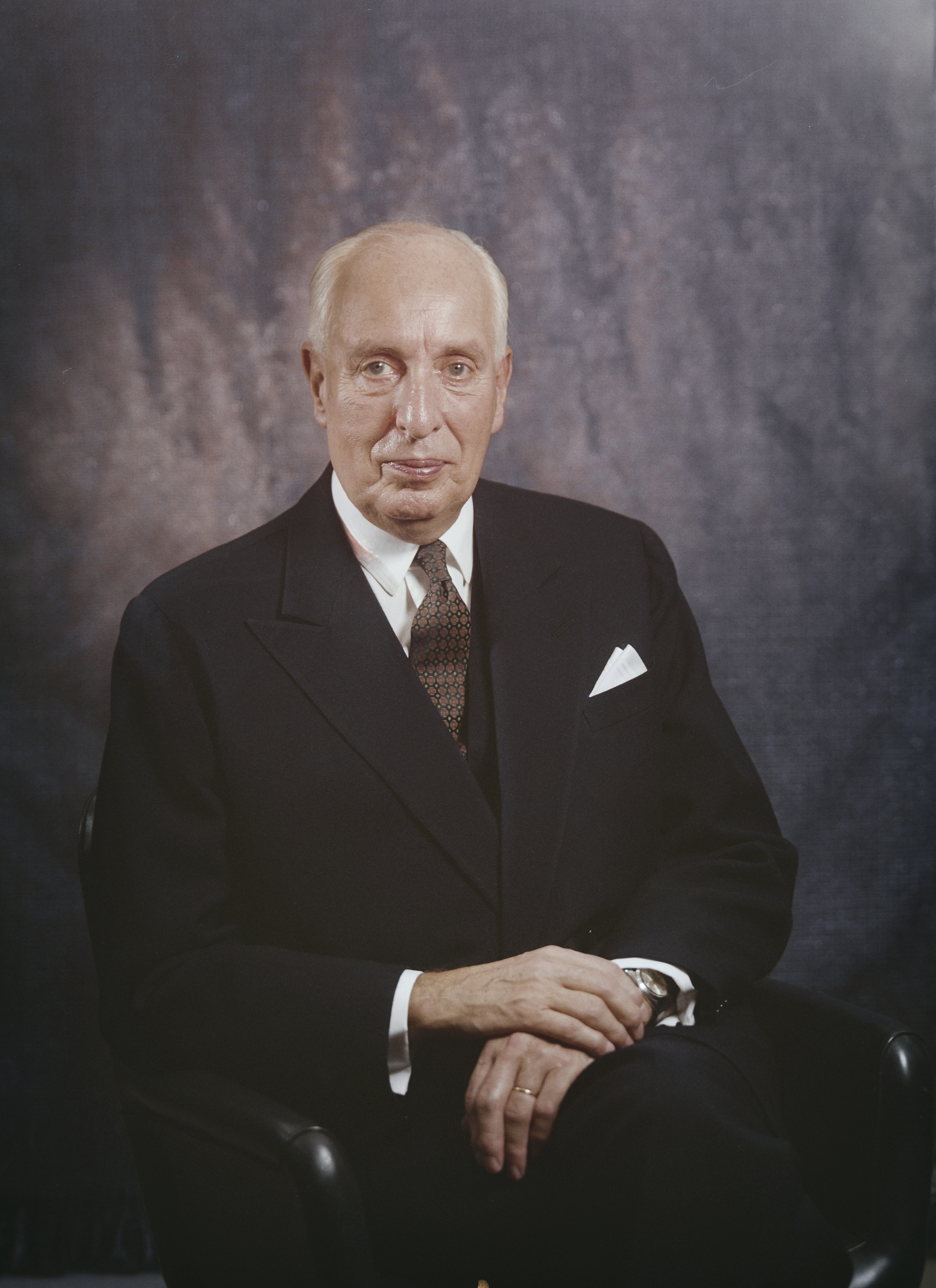
Osmo Orkomies in 1982.

Osmo Lennart Orkomies (8 October 1912 in Juankoski – 12 May 1996) was a Finnish diplomat, educated lawyer. He was an Envoy in Germany from 1950 to 1952. He was appointed head of the division for political affairs at the Ministry for Foreign Affairs in January 1959. He was then Ambassador to Bern in 1959–1962 and Cairo from 1962 to 1966. He was an ambassador in Warsaw 1967–1972, Algiers and Tunis 1975–1979.
