= Erkki Leikola =

Finnish physician, business executive and politician (1900–1986)

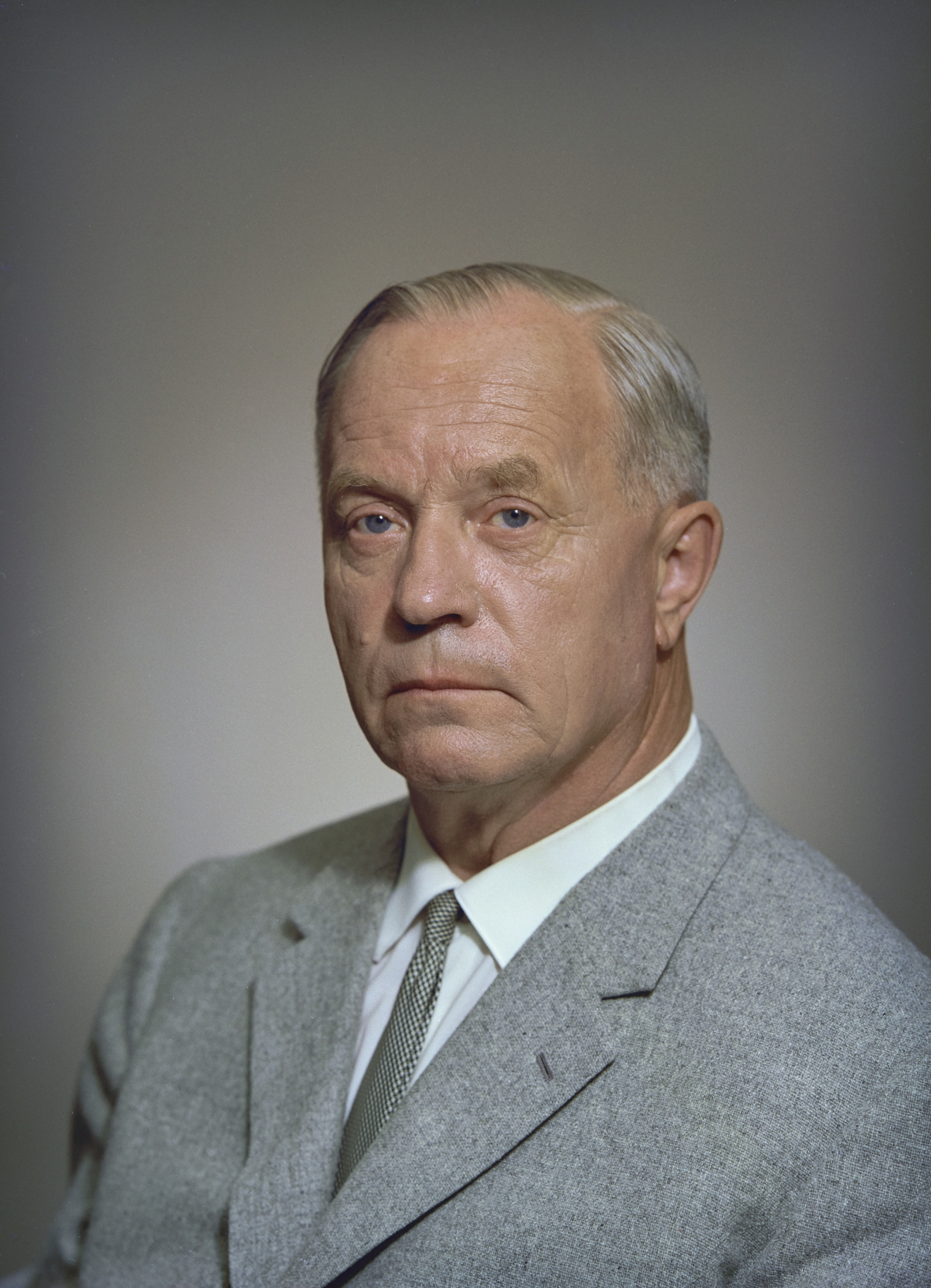
Erkki Leikola in 1964.

Erkki Ensio Leikola (14 August 1900, in Artjärvi – 29 July 1986, in Helsinki; surname until 1906 Leidenius) was a Finnish physician, business executive and politician. He was a member of the Parliament of Finland from 1945 to 1951 and again from 1954 to 1962, representing the National Coalition Party. He was the younger brother of Aare Leikola.
