= Turkka =

Turkka is a Finnish-language surname. Notable people with this surname include:

- Arvi Turkka (1894–1965), Finnish journalist and politician
- Jouko Turkka (1942–2016), Finnish theatrical director and controversialist
- Rolf Turkka (1915–1989), Finnish sailor
- Sirkka Turkka (1939–2021), Finnish poet
- Tellu Turkka (born 1969), Finnish fiddler and singer
