= Paasio =

Paasio is a surname. Notable people with the surname include:

- Heli Paasio (born 1972), Finnish politician, daughter of Pertti and granddaughter of Rafael
- Pertti Paasio (1939–2020), Finnish politician
- Rafael Paasio (1903–1980), Finnish politician and editor
