= Väinö Malmivaara =

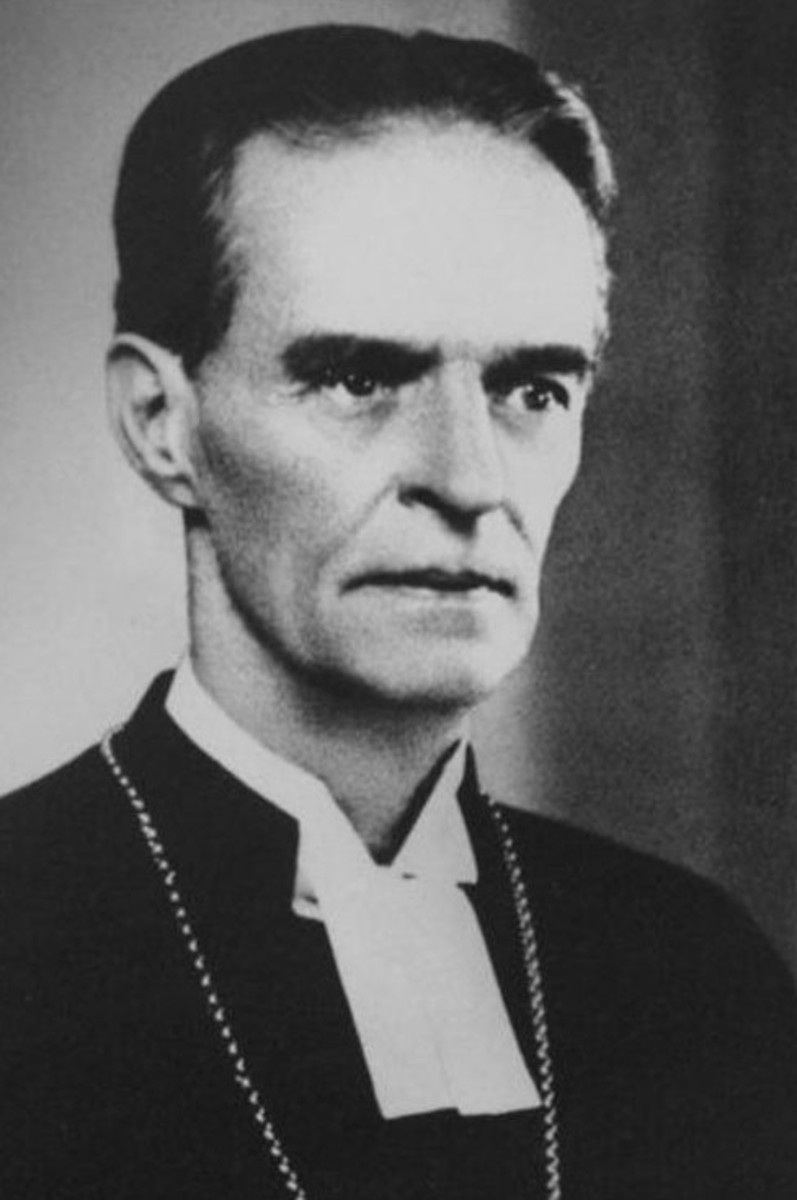
Väinö Malmivaara

Väinö Rafael Malmivaara (7 November 1879 – 13 November 1958) was the Lutheran Bishop of Oulu from 1943 to 1954. He was a member of the Parliament of Finland from 1927 to 1933, representing the National Coalition Party. He was born in Kiuruvesi, the son of Wilhelmi Malmivaara, and died in the same city.
