= Aila Meriluoto =

Finnish poet (1924–2019)

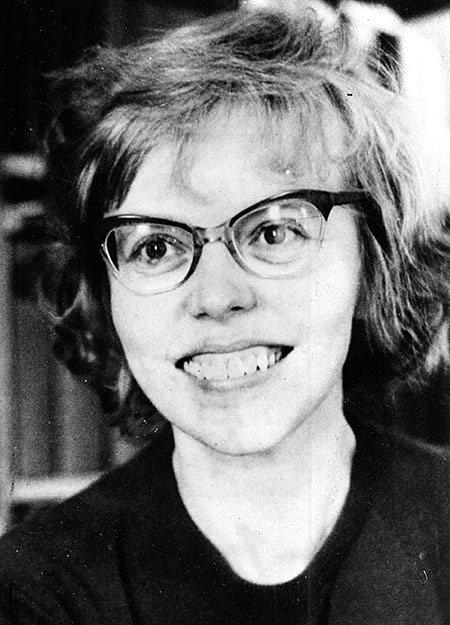
- Born: 10 January 1924; Pieksämäki, Finland
- Died: 21 October 2019 (aged 95); Helsinki, Finland
- Occupations: Poet, Writer, Translator
- Spouse: Lauri Viita

Aila Meriluoto (10 January 1924 – 21 October 2019) was a Finnish poet, writer and translator.

Meriluoto was born in Pieksämäki, and published her first collection of poems, Lasimaalaus at the age of 22. It was a success among critics and readers.

She became the most celebrated and widely read female poet of post-war Finland. The central themes of her early poems are art and femininity. Her first collections reflect the influence of Austrian author Rainer Maria Rilke. In the collection Pahat unet (1956), some of the poems have a free form. The next collection, Portaat, came five years later, and there Meriluoto had found her own modern style of expression.

Meriluoto lived in Sweden for 13 years. In 1974, she moved back to Finland, and the language of her poetry changed again to closer to a talking voice.

In addition to poems, Meriluoto wrote novels and books for young people. She has translated works by Harry Martinson, Rainer Maria Rilke, Shakespeare and Goethe.

Meriluoto was married from 1948 to 1956 to another poet, Lauri Viita. She described him and their stormy marriage in a biographical novel.

Meriluoto died in a care home in Helsinki on 21 October 2019, aged 95.
