= Mikael Soininen =

Finnish architect (1860–1924)

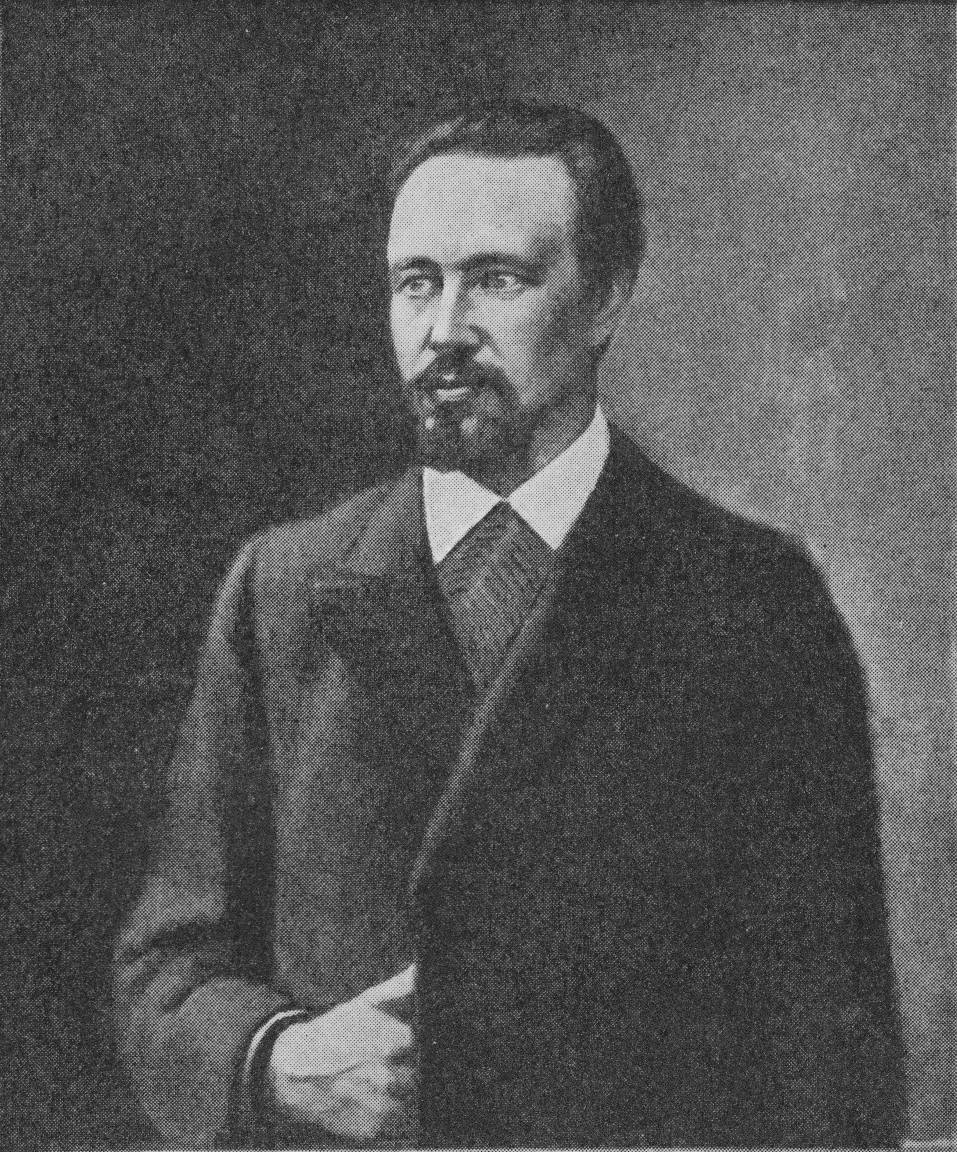
- Mikael Soininen

Minister of Education and Ecclesiastical Affairs of Finland
- In office 27 November 1918 – 15 March 1920

Member of the Parliament of Finland
- In office 22 May 1907 – 1 March 1911

Director-General of the Finnish National Board of Education
- In office 1917–1924

Personal details
- Born: August Mikael Johnsson; November 3, 1860 Kuhmoniemi, Grand Duchy of Finland, Russian Empire
- Died: March 12, 1924 (aged 63) Helsinki, Finland
- Spouse: Elin Amanda Roschier
- Profession: Educationist, professor, politician

August Mikael Soininen (3 November 1860 – 12 March 1924; surname until 1906 Johnsson) was a Finnish professor of Education theory (at the University of Helsinki) and politician, born in Kuhmoniemi. He was Minister of Education from 27 November 1918 to 15 March 1920 and a member of the Parliament of Finland, representing the Finnish Party from 1907 to 1911 and the National Progressive Party from 1919 to 1922.
