= Kataja (surname) =

Kataja is a Finnish surname meaning the common juniper. Notable people with the surname include:

- Erkki Kataja (1924–1969), Finnish pole vaulter
- Janne Kataja (born 1980), Finnish comedian, actor and TV-host
- Jouko Kataja (1953–2018), Finnish footballer
- Ria Kataja (born 1975), Finnish actress
