= Asko Ivalo =

Finnish diplomat

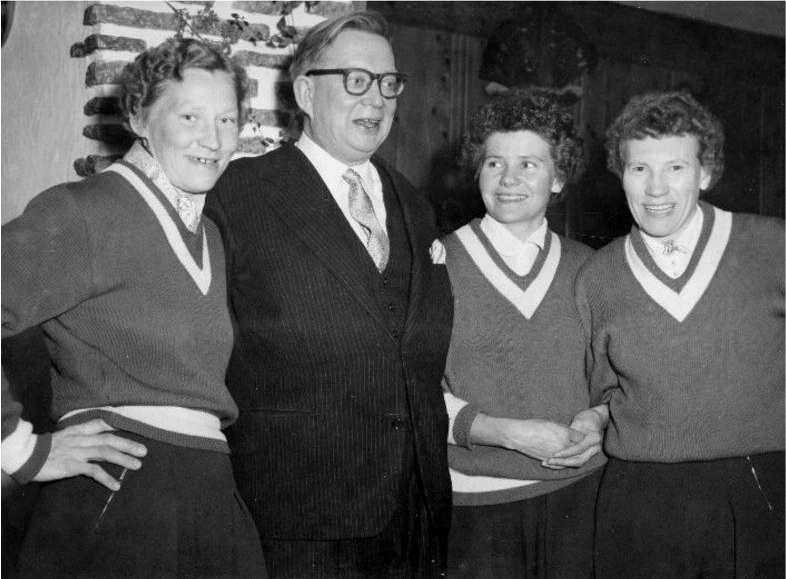
Ivalo with Finnish skiers Siiri Rantanen, Mirja Hietamies and Eva Hög

Asko Päiviö Ivalo (24 June 1901, in Helsinki – 2 November 1968) was a Finnish diplomat who served over 40 years as Ambassador and as Head of the Political Department of the Foreign Ministry.

Asko Ivalo's parents were writers Santeri Ivalo (formerly Ingman) and Ellinor Ivalo. He was married to sculptor Emil Wikström's daughter, Mielikki Wikström. They had three children.

Ivalo was employed by the Ministry for Foreign Affairs since 1926 and served as a diplomat in Tallinn, Stockholm, Moscow, Bulgaria, Yugoslavia, and Paris.

He worked as envoy in Ankara 1951–1954, the Hague 1947–1951, Pakistan 1951–1954, Tehran 1951–1954, and ambassador to Damascus 1958–1959, Bangkok 1964–1968, Rome 1954–1961, New Delhi 1964–1968, and Jakarta 1964–1968.

== Sources ==
- Juhani Kerkkosen Genealogy-sivusto: Ivalo Asko & Wikström Mielikki
