= Aarne Wuorimaa =

Finnish diplomat

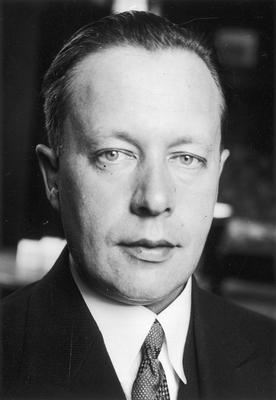
Aarne Wuorimaa in 1933.

Aarne Artur Wuorimaa (last name Blomberg until 1906), (8 February 1892 Leivonmäki - 5 July 1975, Helsinki) was a Finnish diplomat who served as the Finnish Ambassador to Nazi Germany in the 1930s.

The parents of Wuorimaa were parish priest, MP Arthur Oliver Wuorimaa and Anna Emilia Fabritius. He graduated in 1910 and graduated as a Bachelor of Philosophy and master's degree in 1916.

Wuorimaa served as Air Force Adviser in 1918–1919, Consul General of Finland in London in 1919 and Representative of the Finnish Government at the Red Cross in the United States in 1920–1921. He was then Assistant to the Mission in Paris from 1921 to 1922, serving in the Secretary General's office in the League of Nations in 1923-1925 and as Secretary of State in Paris between 1925 and 1928.

Wuorimaa was Finland's Envoy in Tallinn from 1928 to 1933, in Berlin from 1933 to 1940, in Budapest and in Sofia from 1940 to 1944, and later was transferred to non-active status and retired from the post.

He later rejoined the active service as Head of the Administrative Department of the Ministry of Foreign Affairs from 1950 to 1951, and Ambassador to The Hague and Lisbon from 1951 to 1959
