= Veikko Antero Koskenniemi =

Finnish poet (1885–1962)

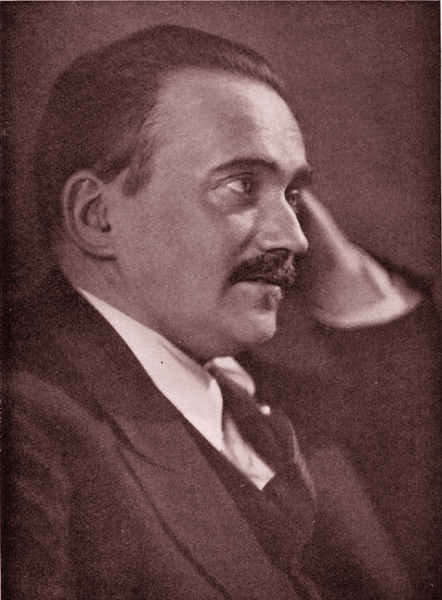

Veikko Antero Koskenniemi (8 July 1885 – 4 August 1962) was a Finnish poet, newspaper editor, and literary professor.

Koskenniemi was one of Finland's most popular writers. He was well known for his poems, travel books, and essays. He was influenced by Goethe, Runeberg, French Parnassans and Symbolists. His lyric poetry has been set to music by dozens of composers. He is perhaps best known for writing the lyrics for the Finlandia hymn. Koskenniemi's nationalism was reflected in many of his poems and lyrics, such as Lippulaulusu and Finlandia.

Asteroid 1697 Koskenniemi, discovered in 1940–1941, is named after him.

== Early life ==
He was born Veikko Antero Forsnäs, the son of schoolteacher Anders Johansson Boholm Forsnäs (1833–1888) and Aina Maria Hällberg (1858–1934). The family lived in Oulu. His father died when Veikko was only three years old, and the boy was raised primarily by his mother and aunts. Like many Finns with Swedish surnames, he eventually changed his last name from Forsnäs to the Finnish equivalent Koskenniemi. Both names translate to "waterfall rapids."

== Education ==
After graduating from Oulu Lyceum in 1903, Koskenniemi studied at the University of Helsinki, where he graduated with a master's degree in 1907. During his studies, he worked as an editor for the reformist socialist magazine Raataja. He worked as a critic and freelance writer until 1921, when he received a professorship at the University of Turku, where he served as Professor of Literary History from 1921 to 1948. He was the university's rector from 1924 to 1932. In 1948 he became a member of the Finnish Academy. In 1922 Koskenniemi married scholar Vieno Pohjanpalo (1897–1989). They had two children, Inna Koskenniemi, a professor of English philology, and Hannu Koskenniemi, a court justice. One of their grandsons, Martti Koskenniemi, is an internationally respected researcher in international law.

== Sympathy with National Socialism ==
Koskenniemi's father-in-law, Juhani Pohjanpalo, was a supporter of the far-right Lapua party. Koskenniemi became an ardent anti-Communist. He was influenced by Oswald Spengler's The Decline of the West, which argued that Western culture was in danger of collapsing as a result of excessive freedom and democracy.

In 1936 Koskenniemi traveled to Nazi Germany to lecture at the invitation of the East European Research Society. He had considerable sympathy for National Socialism and Fascism and in 1941 was elected vice-chairman of the European Writers' Union created by Nazi Germany.

After the end of World War II, Koskenniemi came under fierce criticism for his association with Nazism. At the same time, his poetry declined in popularity, considered old-fashioned. He retained his post at the University of Turku, however, and in 1948, he became the first writer appointed to the newly established Finnish Academy.

== Death ==
Koskenniemi died on 4 August 1962 in Turku. He is buried in Turku Cemetery.
