= Harri Holma =

Finnish diplomat and assyriologist

Harri Gustaf Holma (last name until 1906 Hellman; April 14, 1886 – April 14, 1954) was a Finnish diplomat and assyriologist.

Holma was born in Hämeenlinna. His parents were colleague Anders Victor Hellman and Anna Ida Charlotta af Enehjelm. He graduated from the Finnish Normal School in 1903 and studied at the University of Helsinki completing Bachelor and Master of Philosophy in 1907, Licentiate in 1912 and Ph.D. in 1914. Holma studied assyriology in Berlin in 1910, Leipzig and London.

Holma served as a docent of Assyriology and Semitic Philology at the University of Helsinki from 1913 to 1923, as a librarian at the Student Library from 1904 to 1919 and as secretary to the Finnish Science Club delegation, librarian and a treasurer 1914–1919. Holma was the secretary and chairman of the Estonian Assistant Committee since 1919.

After Finland became independent, Holma moved to the Ministry for Foreign Affairs. He was Head of the archive department of the Ministry of Foreign Affairs in 1918, a newsreader and secretary of the post in Copenhagen from 1919 to 1920, and as Chargé d'Affaires in Berlin in 1920–1921.

In 1918, Holma was also sent to familiarize Hesse's Landgraf Friedrich Karl with Finnish culture and language who was planned for the King of Finland.

Holma served as Envoy to Berlin and Vienna from 1921 to 1927, Paris, Brussels and Luxembourg from 1927 to 1943, Holy See from 1943 to 1947 and Rome from 1947 to 1953. Holma was also a member of the Finnish delegation to the General Assembly of the League of Nations in 1935–1939 and a permanent member of the National Guard Committee of the League of Nations 1936–1941.

Holma donated his collection of art collections to the City of Lahti in 1953. He died in Capri, Italy, aged 68.

Harri Holma was married from 1912 to Alli Maria Haapakoski (1888–1963). Their son was a writer and art historian Klaus Ben Holma. Harri Holma's brother, Kaarlo Holma, was a lawyer, a colleague MP and a Parliamentary Ombudsman.
