= Tuomas Pohjanpalo =

Tuomas Pohjanpalo (3 March 1861 – 27 February 1933; surname until 1906 Friis) was a Finnish industrialist and politician, born in Kalajoki. He was a member of the Parliament of Finland from 1907 to 1909, representing the Finnish Party.
