= Pentti Hiidenheimo =

Finnish politician

Bengt Henrik (Pentti Heikki) Hiidenheimo (29 January 1875, Vihti – 16 February 1918; surname until 1906 Törnström) was a Finnish farmer and politician. He was a Member of the Parliament of Finland from 1913 to 1917, representing the Finnish Party. Hiidenheimo was shot by Red Guards during the Finnish Civil War. Pentti Hiidenheimo was the elder brother of Artturi Hiidenheimo.
