= Bruno Kivikoski =

Finnish diplomat and lawyer (1892–1982)

Bruno Rafael Kivikoski (23 January 1892 – 2 February 1982), until 1906 Stenfors, was a Finnish diplomat and a lawyer.

Kivikoski was Secretary of State for Foreign Affairs 1935–1938, Envoy in Warsaw 1938–1939, Envoy in Bucharest from 1939 to 1941, Head of the Office of the President of Republic 1941–1954 and Envoy in Ankara in 1954–1959 (Ambassador from 1958). He received the title of special envoy and sovereign minister in 1942.
