= Joel Pekuri =

Finnish diplomat and ambassador

Joel Allan Pekuri (11 July 1927 – 30 August 1991) was a Finnish diplomat and ambassador.

Pekuri was born in Suojärvi. His parents were forester Gustaf Adolf Pekuri (former Roth) and Olga Gobert. He graduated in 1946 and graduated from the University of Helsinki with a bachelor's degree in 1952, completing her legal bachelor's degree.

Pekuri served as a trainee and assistant to the Ministry for Foreign Affairs from 1953 to 1954 and served as the Delegation Assistant to the Cologne Trade Representation in 1955-1957, as Counselor in New York, 1957-1959, and II as Secretary of State in Beijing, 1959-1962. He was then a deputy secretary of the Ministry of Foreign Affairs and 1962-1964, I Secretary of the Embassy in Buenos Aires 1964-1965 and Embassy Counselor in Stockholm 1965-1969.

Pekuri was Ambassador of Finland to Addis Ababa from 1969 to 1971 and also as ambassador to Nairobi, Dar es Salaam, Lusaka and Kampala, as a negotiating officer for the Ministry of Foreign Affairs from 1972 to 1975, Ambassador to Cairo, at Damascus and Khartoum from 1975 to 1978 and Ambassador to Madrid in 1978-1984 and in The Hague 1989-1991.

Pekuri was also Secretary of Defense in 1963-1964 and Secretary General of the CSCE Consultations, Foreign Ministers' Meeting and Heads of State in 1973 and 1975.
