= Oswald Kairamo =

Finnish politician and botanist

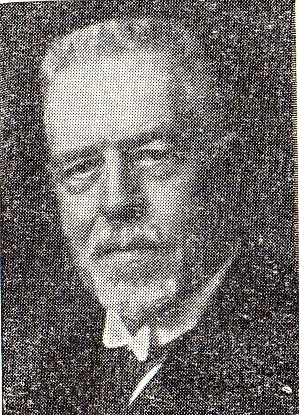
Alfred Oswald Kairamo.

Alfred Oswald Kairamo, named Kihlman before 1906, (4 October 1858 in Jakobstad – 29 July 1938 in Hattula) was a Finnish politician and botanist. He was a member of the Senate of Finland.

== Biography ==
Kairamo's parents were the principal Alfred Kihlman and Hilda Augusta Wilhelmina Forssell.

Kairamo graduated from the Svenska Normallyceum in Helsinki and became an associate teaching assistant in 1880, a Licentiate of Arts and Doctor of Arts in 1883, a docent in 1885 and was an associate professor of botany at the University of Helsinki from 1897 to 1903. Kairamo's most important scientific activities consist of studies on the ascomycete fungi, Zur Entwickelungsgeschichte der Ascomyceten (1883), plant biological investigations in Lapland, including those concerning the tree line, phenological observations and, in connection with this, research into night frosts in Finland.

He was also active as a museum worker and took a significant part in the preparation of the "Herbarium musei fennici". Kairamo co-founded Osuuskuntien Keskusjärjestö Pellervo (Central Organisation of Cooperatives Pellervo), and served as vice-chairman of its board 1899–1903, and the central loan fund of the Osuuskassojen Keskuslainarahasto Osakeyhtiö, where he served as chairman of its board of trustees 1901–1903, and Kajaanin Puutavara Oy, a company in the forest industry.

In the 1890s, Kairamo joined the Finnish Party. He was called in 1903 to be a senator and head of the agricultural expedition, a position he held until 1905, and in 1905–1906 took an active part in the formulation of the party's agrarian program. During his time as a senator, Kairamo increased support for the Pellervo Organisation, made sure that state loans were granted for the establishment of dairies, and that cooperation was taught in the state agricultural schools.

The political storm of November 1905, which purged the Senate, also forced Kairamo to leave the Senate. After his term in the Senate, Kairamo was the government's representative in Estonia and served as chairman of the State Auditors for eight years. He was then active in the political sphere as a member of the Diet, where he was considered one of the leaders of his party. While many actively campaigned for Finnish independence, Kairamo was among those who, disappointed by the socialist revolution, wanted to restrict the right to vote and supported a bicameral Diet and monarchy.

One of Kairamo's most important contributions was his role in the Hankkija Central Cooperative (Hankkija Oy since 2013). By 1908 the cooperative's ideologically constrained operations had brought it close to insolvency. Kairamo personally negotiated an emergency loan from Kansallis-Osake-Pankki, rescuing Hankkija and resulting in his appointment as chairman of its board. The episode represented a shift toward commercial thinking within the organisation, a direction Kairamo continued to steer during the 1920s by concentrating on wholesale trade and keeping warehousing and distribution limited.

Another contribution to Hankkija's development came through Kairamo's decision to base the cooperative's experimental work at his home farm in Ellilä, Hattula. From this foundation grew the Hankkija Plant Breeding Institute, which went on to play a central role in the development of grain cultivation in Finland.

He married Anna Brusila, a primary school teacher, in 1897.

== Bibliography ==
- Zur Entwicklungsgeschichte der Ascomyceten (1883)
- Anteckningar om floran i Inari Lappmark (1885)
- Beobachtungen über die periodischen Erscheinungen des Pflanzenlebens in Finnland (1883)
- Redogörelse för en naturvetenskaplig expedition till det inre af rysk-lapska halfön 1887 (1887)
- Die Expedition nach der Halbinsel Kola im Jahre 1887. Vorläufig geschildert (1890)
- Pflanzenbiologische Studien aus Russisch-Lappland. Ein Beitrag zur Kenntniss der regionalen Gliederung an der polaren Waldgrenze (1890)
- Bericht einer naturwissenschaftlichen Reise durch Russisch-Lappland im Jahre 1889 (1890)
- Nattfrosterna i Finland 1892 (1893)
- Nattfrosterna i Finland 1893−1894 (1895)
- Herbarium Musei Fennici. Editio secunda I (with Thiodolf Saelan and Hjalmar Hjelt, 1889)
- Pflanzenphänologische Beobachtungen in Finnland 1895 (1900)
- Suuntaa tiedustelemassa. Havaintoja kertoili kansallismielinen (1903)
- Torpparit ja sosialistit (1907)
- Suomen suhteet ulkomaihin (1918)
