= Atle Asanti =

Finnish diplomat and lawyer

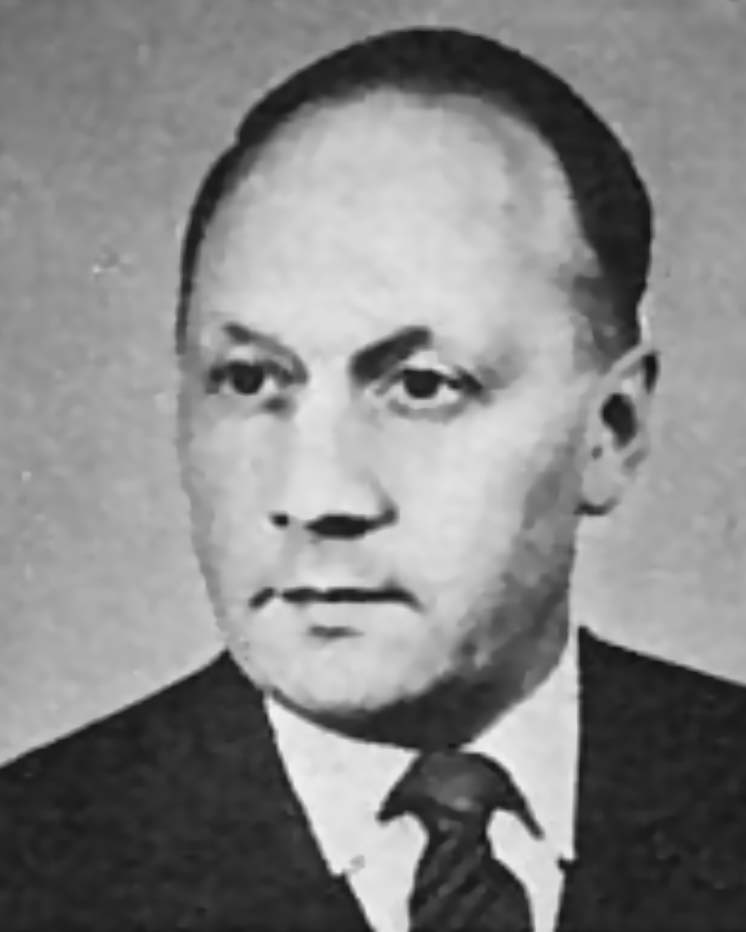
Atle Asanti

Atle Armas Gabriel Asanti (until 1937 Aschan; 31 May 1905 - 3 January 1992) was a Finnish diplomat and lawyer.

== Early life ==
Asanti became an undergraduate student in 1925. In 1931, he completed a bachelor's degree in law. Asanti earned a Master in Law in 1934. He went to work at the Ministry for Foreign Affairs that year.

== Career ==
Assanti worked as an assistant to the delegations in Stockholm, Berlin, and Moscow in the 1930s.

Post-war, Asanti served as secretary of the Foreign Ministry and later as a Division Chief from 1957-1959 as well as the head of the Legal Department.

Asanti was appointed Finland's ambassador to the United Arab Republic from 1959 to 1962 and served as Ambassador to Beirut and Khartoum 1959–1962. He was Envoy to Addis Abeba between 1959–1962.

He was ambassador in Prague 1962–1972 and Tirana 1962–1971. Asanti retired in 1972.

Asanti was a member of the Board of Directors of Finnish Foreign Trade Association and International Law Association's Finnish Department.

In 1947 he received the title of the Counselor's Counsel; then in 1959 the title of the Sovereign Special Ambassador.
