= Artur Wuorimaa =

Finnish politician

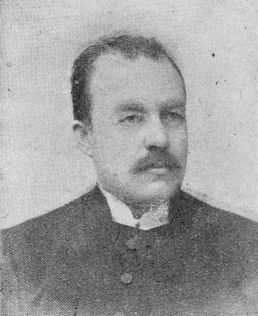
A. O. Wuorimaa

Artur Oliver Wuorimaa (1 August 1854, Dragsfjärd – 9 November 1921; surname until 1906 Blomberg) was a Finnish Lutheran clergyman and politician. He was a member of the Diet of Finland in 1897 and of the Parliament of Finland from 1907 to 1910 and from 1911 to 1913, representing the Finnish Party and again from 1917 to 1921, representing the Agrarian League.
