= Oskari Wilho Louhivuori =

Finnish politician

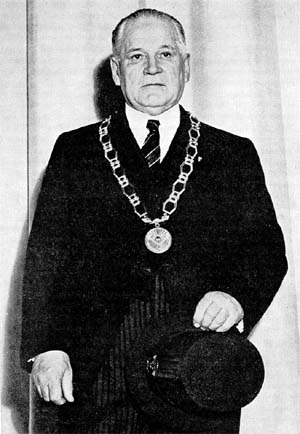
Oskari Wilho Louhivuori in 1950

Oskari Wilho Louhivuori (18 September 1884 – 1 July 1953) was a Finnish politician, born in Kuopion maalaiskunta. He was a member of the Senate of Finland from 1917 to 1919. He was also rector of the University of Helsinki's School of Business during the post-World War II era, helping to rebuild the program.
