= Artturi Hiidenheimo =

Finnish politician (1877–1956)

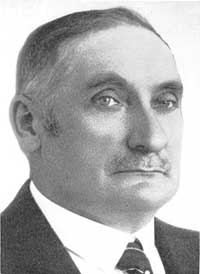
Artturi Hiidenheimo

Arthur (Artturi) Fredrik Hiidenheimo (23 May 1877, Vihti – 14 January 1956; surname until 1906 Törnström) was a Finnish farmer and politician. He was a member of the Parliament of Finland from 1919 to 1927, representing the National Coalition Party.
