= Anton Salonen incident =

International child custody dispute

Anton Salonen (Russian: Антон Салонен; born 3 October 2003) is a child with Russian-Finnish dual citizenship involved in an international child custody dispute between his parents. The Finnish-born child was first abducted by his Estonian Russian mother in 2008 and taken to Russia. In turn the boy was abducted by his father in 2009 and smuggled back to Finland with the help of Finnish diplomats stationed at the Finnish consulate in Saint Petersburg. The incident has sparked a diplomatic row between Finland and Russia. The Finnish diplomat who helped to abduct the child was dismissed from the Finnish Consulate and Russia has declared him persona non grata.

== Background ==
Anton's Finnish father and Russian Estonian mother met in Tallinn, Estonia in 1994 and married in 1997. The pair filed for legal divorce in 2002, which came into effect on 13 January 2003, but they continued to live together until 2005. Anton was born out of wedlock on 3 October 2003. At birth Anton was legally entitled to Russian citizenship, but the citizenship was never registered. He was registered as a Finnish citizen after the Finnish father's paternity had been established. His mother gained Finnish citizenship via naturalisation after the birth. After the divorce the parents had joint custody.

From a previous marriage of his mother, Anton has an older, 19-year-old brother, whom she left in Finland.

=== Abduction by mother to Russia ===
Anton's mother left Finland with Anton without the consent of the father on 5 March 2008. The Russian Embassy in Finland assisted the mother with the Russian visa application. The signature of the father is presumed to have been forged on the application.

The 65-year-old father blames a religious organization near the Russian Orthodox Church in Finland for the abduction, calling the Memorial Society of Saint Seraphim of Sarov (Finnish: Serafim Sarovilaisen Muistoyhdistys) a sect. The lower court in Tampere ordered that the mother be detained on suspicion of child abduction. The order is only effective inside the European Union. Russia is not a signatory of the Hague Convention on the Civil Aspects of International Child Abduction. The court also gave sole custody of the child to the father. In Russia Anton was granted Russian citizenship based on information provided by the mother. According to Uusi Suomi this sort of citizenship is normally granted in months, not in days.

After locating the child and mother in Balakhna near Nizhny Novgorod the father initiated legal proceedings in Russia to regain custody and revoke the Russian citizenship. On 20 November 2008, the Balakhna City Court revoked Anton's Russian citizenship because his mother had presented false information for registration of citizenship. On 17 March 2009, the judicial board on civil cases of the Nizhny Novgorod regional court upheld the decision. After the decision, the father came to Russia to take Anton back to Finland.

=== Abduction by father ===
Russian online newspaper Grani.ru claimed that in April 2009 Anton was forcibly taken from his mother by his father outside her home on Ryazanova Street. The press service of Russia's Investigation Committee alleges that on 12 April 2009, the father, acting in conspiracy with persons unknown, attacked the mother and retrieved Anton. After allegedly being prevented from leaving Russia, the father and son took refuge at a vacant apartment of the Finnish Consulate-General in Saint Petersburg.

The Russian authorities allegedly ignored the earlier Russian court decision and Anton's Russian citizenship was expeditiously re-instated on 7 May. One day later, on 8 May, Anton was smuggled to Finland in the closed trunk of a diplomatic car by the legal consul at the Saint Petersburg consulate, Simo Pietiläinen.

== Diplomatic incident ==
The story was revealed on 14 May by the Finnish scandal paper 7 päivää causing a diplomatic incident. Russian foreign minister Sergey Lavrov called his Finnish counterpart Alexander Stubb to protest and to demand an explanation. The Russian Foreign Ministry accused Finland of a blatant violation of the Vienna Convention on Diplomatic Relations, which states that diplomats should strictly observe the laws of the host country. The formal complaint was followed by a formal diplomatic note on 20 May. Pietiläinen, who helped take Anton out of Russia, was dismissed from the Finnish Consulate in St. Petersburg after the incident. Russia has declared Pietiläinen persona non grata.

The developments in St. Petersburg were closely followed by the Finnish government, including President Tarja Halonen, who condemned the behaviour of Simo Pietiläinen, whilst Finnish Minister for Foreign Affairs Alexander Stubb defended Pietiläinen's behaviour. President Halonen, Prime Minister Matti Vanhanen and foreign minister Stubb all denied having prior knowledge of the smuggling plan or the involvement of Finnish diplomats in it.

== Conflict of law ==
There is a conflict of law between Finland and Russia. It is a criminal offense under Finnish law for the Russian mother to take her child to Russia. It is a criminal offense under Russian law for the Finnish diplomat to take the same child from Russia back to Finland. This is why the Finnish diplomat was declared persona non grata while the Russian mother faces parental abduction criminal charges in Finland.

== Reactions ==
The incident has been widely covered in Finnish and Russian media in what some commentators have described as a media war. The Russian media have speculated that the incident will have a negative effect on Finland–Russia relations. The case has also been compared to that of Elise André (Russian: Элиза Андре), also discussed in the media at the time.

The Investigation Committee of the Russian Prosecutor's office has launched criminal proceedings against the father on suspicion of "pre-meditated kidnapping of a person by an organized group" under article 126 of the Russian Criminal Code.

== Trial of mother in Finland ==
Anton's mother returned to Finland on 1 August 2009. She was arrested at the airport in the Tampere. A Finnish court considered the case of Anton's mother, and released her pending trial. However she was given a travel ban for the next 60 days. Through the Russian media, Johan Bäckman claimed that a Finnish police officer promised not to arrest Anton's mother, and furthermore the mother was allegedly arrested in Estonia's capital Tallinn. Bäckman was presented as one of the aides or lawyers of Rimma Salonen, while the trial lawyer is Heikki Lampela in Finland and Dmitry Glazov in Russia. Finnish media have reported some claims as a matter of inquiry.

The incident has been top television news in Russia. The main villains have been Anton's Finnish father and the Finnish diplomat Simo Pietiläinen. Johan Bäckman has had a central role as commentator about the incident in Russia and Finland. His comments and speculation have been published as such, without fact-checking, in many Russian media, such as Ria Novosti. Later Bäckman apologized his comments about the incident, but he has later recanted and is again arranging demonstrations against Paavo Salonen.

The Russian foreign ministry has made negative comments, and implied the negative effect of the incident to mutual relations between Russia and Finland.

According to Finnish expert on Russia Ilmari Susiluoto, the case of Anton is part of the Kremlin public relations campaign. The Finns have too positive an image in Russia, and this does not fit the Kremlin's idea of the "hostile outside world".

Rimma Salonen was given a one to five year suspended sentence for kidnapping and child abduction on 13 October 2009 in käräjäoikeus (lower court). She also had to pay 20,000 euros for emotional distress to her son and almost 4,800 euros to Paavo Salonen. The next year, hovioikeus (the Finnish appeals court) upheld Salonen's suspended prison sentence. However, the court did lower the damages awarded Anton Salonen to 10,000 euros. The court also ordered her to pay 7,500 euros in legal fees for Anton and Paavo Salonen.

== Aftermath ==
In May 2010, Russian Child Rights Ombudsman Pavel Astakhov accused the Finnish authorities of denying Anton the right to speak Russian. Astakhov also referred to statements of Johan Bäckman that Finnish authorities had also banned Anton from praying, being baptized, or wearing crosses. A Russian newspaper reported these claims and referred Anton's mother and Bäckman to the Finnish Anti-Fascist Committee.

In March 2011, Rimma Salonen announced she is a candidate for the 2011 Finnish parliamentary election for the Workers Party of Finland. She also represented the organization of Finnish Anti-Fascist Committee. Salonen got 16 votes.

Russia joined the Hague Abduction Convention on 1 October 2011.

In April 2012 Rimma Salonen appealed to the Russian people and called for help because, according to her, Western authorities are stealing talented and unique Russian children to supplant Western children who are just robots and sex dolls.

In May 2013 Supreme Court of Finland decided not to give Rimma Salonen right to appeal for the ruling of Vaasa Hovrätt. This means Anton's father is his legal guardian as Vaasa Hovrätt ruled.

In May 2020, the tabloid Ilta-Sanomat posted an article providing an update on Anton as well as an interview with Paavo. According to the article, Anton had visited Rimma every other weekend since the incident after resolving their issues.

== See also ==
- Rantala incident
