= Jyrki Aimonen =

Finnish diplomat and ambassador

Jyrki Martti Bertil Aimonen (19 April 1934 Ikaalinen – 20 July 2016 Helsinki) was a Finnish diplomat and ambassador

Aimonen's parents were physicians, Counselor of Medicine, Martti Bertil Aimonen and special teacher Anja-Ritva Mielikki Aimonen. Jyrki Aimonen graduated as an economist in 1955 and candidate of law in 1961.

Aimonen started in the Ministry for Foreign Affairs in 1961 and moved to the Finnish Embassy in Moscow in 1963, after which he served as Secretary in Ankara from 1965 to 1967. He returned to the Soviet Union as consul in the Leningrad Consulate General.

Aimonen was the Counselor in Moscow from 1974 to 1976. He served, among other things, as consular at the Finnish Embassy in Moscow. He served as the Head of the 1975 European Security and Cooperation Conference. He also served as Counselor in Copenhagen from 1970 to 1974.

Aimonen was the first Finnish Ambassador to Libya and in Malta from 1979 to 1983. After that he served as Ambassador to Syria, Jordan, Lebanon (1984–1988), India, Nepal (1988–1991), Bangladesh, Sri Lanka (1988–1991) and Bhutan (1989–1991). Aimonen retired from his diplomatic post after serving as Ambassador to Poland from 1991 to 1995.
