= Boris Spiegel =

Russian politician and businessman

- Бори́с Исаа́кович Шпи́гель
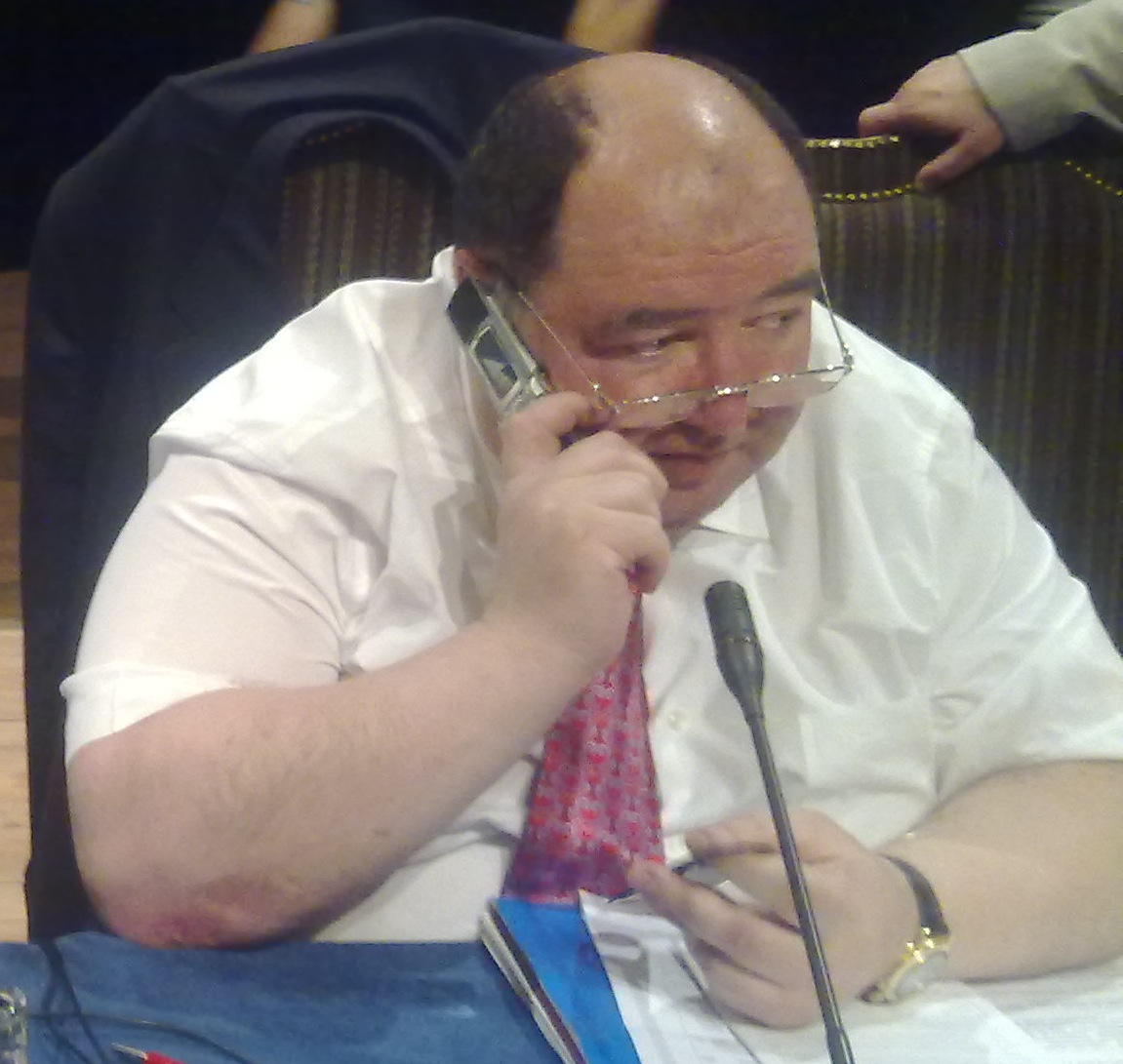
- Born: February 18, 1953 (age 73); Proskurov, Ukrainian SSR, USSR (now Khmelnytskyi, Ukraine)
- Occupations: Politician and businessman

Boris Spiegel (born 18 February 1953 in Khmelnytskyi, Ukraine) (Russian: Бори́с Исаа́кович Шпи́гель) is a Russian politician and businessman. Haaretz describes him as an oligarch who is "closely tied to the Kremlin." From 2003 to 2013, he represented Penza Oblast in the Russian Federation Council; in December 2011, he was appointed the First Deputy Chairman of the Committee on Constitutional Legislation, Legal and Judicial Affairs and Civil Society Development.

In 2010, he founded World Without Nazism, an organisation with close ties to the Russian government, formed to affirm the Russian version of history, particularly in relation to the Soviet occupation of the Baltic states and the Holodomor. This followed the establishment of the Presidential Commission of the Russian Federation to Counter Attempts to Falsify History to the Detriment of Russia's Interests the previous year. The organization is described in the Annual Review of the Estonian Security Police as a propaganda organization aimed at promoting "a Soviet-era approach to World War II." It cooperates closely with the Finnish Anti-Fascist Committee. He is also chairman of the organization World Congress of Russian Jewry (WCRJ), an organisation that according to The Jewish Chronicle "works on behalf of the Kremlin" despite its nominal independence. During the 2008 South Ossetia War, acting as president of WCRJ, he accused Georgia of committing genocide, which attracted criticism from Israeli voices.

The Jewish Chronicle writes that Spiegel "is firmly in the pro-Putin camp. His subservience was clearly on show […] during the fighting in the Caucasus when he joined the Kremlin's propaganda campaign calling for the establishment of a tribunal that would investigate Georgia's 'war crimes' and 'genocide.'"

Spiegel has accused the countries that were formerly part of the Communist Bloc (except Russia and Belarus) of "rapid nazification". He also criticizes the "Western European democracies" for their alleged role in starting World War II. He proposes a common history textbook for all of Europe based on "serious scientific study, as well as the decisions of international judicial and political authorities on which basis the postwar world order had been built."

He founded the pharmaceutical company Biotech in 1990 and the music production company "Music. Perfection. Beauty" in 1999. He has been deputy chairman of the political party Revival of Russia since 2002.

In January 2011, Spiegel was the subject of media attention when he was robbed of $280,000 in cash in his hotel room.

He is the former father-in-law of popular Russian tenor singer Nikolay Baskov.

He is one of the few Russian politicians who openly proclaim himself as an adherent of Judaism. On Spiegel's initiative, monuments depicting Soviet Red Army soldiers have been erected in the Israeli city of Netanya.

In March 2013, Spiegel resigned from the Russian Federation Council.

During COVID-19 pandemic Spiegel's companies were one of the major Russian suppliers of antiviral medications (Avifavir, Areplivir), diagnostic systems Biozek and antiseptic solutions. In 2020 his companies sold 45 billion Russian ruble (approximately $600 million) worth of Covid medications.

Spiegel and his wife Evgenia Spiegel were detained by the Russian police in March 2021 in connection with allegedly giving bribes to Penza Oblast governor Ivan Belozertsev. In his March 2021 interview with Marina Litvinovich Spiegel alleged that his criminal case was fabricated in order to change the ownership of his successful pharmaceutical business, complained about the tortuous detention conditions and compared himself with Sergei Magnitsky.

== Scandals ==
In January 2011, approximately one million shekels and a watch worth about 300,000 shekels were stolen from a safe in a hotel room at Herods Hotel, which Boris Shpigel was occupying. The money was reportedly intended for vacation expenses.

In January 2013, a scan of a document allegedly representing a copy of a 1982 criminal verdict against Shpigel under Article 120 of the RSFSR Criminal Code ("lewd acts" involving a minor) appeared on the blog of Kristina Potupchik. The document had previously surfaced elsewhere. The publication was picked up by various blogs and even some media outlets. However, other bloggers soon pointed out inconsistencies suggesting the document was fake: it listed jury members with implausible surnames not found in any official registries, contained multiple legal errors, and there was no record of Boris Shpigel ever being in custody.

An expert from the Institute for Strategic Studies suggested that the timing of the document's appearance might be connected to the anniversary of the deaths of Anastasia Baburova and Stanislav Markelov (January 19), speculating that anti-antifascist groups launched the smear campaign in anticipation of that date. The Youth Union of Lawyers of Russia called on bloggers to unite against the spread of libel and forgeries in the blogosphere, citing the post about Shpigel and a similar one about Yekaterina Lakhova as examples. It was also noted that the authors of such fabrications were unlikely to face charges under Article 128 of the Russian Criminal Code, which nevertheless intimidates more conscientious content creators. Bloggers were encouraged to conduct a kind of "clean-up day" to remove unverified reposts from their feeds.

In December 2013, Andrey Karaulov, host of the television program Moment of Truth, accused Shpigel of orchestrating the creation of forged letters bearing his signature.
