= Rantala incident =

Subject of an international incident

Robert Rantala (Russian: Роберт Рантала, born 2002) is a Russian-Finnish dual citizen who at seven years old was taken by the Finnish social service to a children's shelter in early 2010. Russian media followed closely the incident for weeks. He escaped from school to his parents and Russia's Commissioner for Children Pavel Astakhov visited in Finland.

== Background ==
Robert Rantala is a son of the Russian mother Inga Rantala and Finnish father Veli-Pekka Rantala. The family lives in Turku, Finland. The boy was taken into child custody on 4 February 2010. Robert attended to school but escaped to his family. Russia's Commissioner for Children Pavel Astakhov met Finnish social workers in Finland on 18 March. The result of his efforts was the boy will stay with his family, but Finnish social workers will make regular visits, which solved the issue for both sides. However, in July, Inga and Robert left for Russia. In September of the same year, it was announced that they were living in St. Petersburg, where Robert continued his education. In October 2012, Robert received Russian citizenship.

== Incident in the Russian media ==
The first news of the incident was published by Interfax on 19 February with the commentaries of Finnish Anti-Fascist Committee activist Johan Bäckman and the boy's mother Inga Rantala. After that the event became one of the most debated issues in Russia and Bäckman was a central commentator of the case in Russian media. According to Kommersant, Bäckman was the primary source of the incident.

The Russian media has mainly presented the incident by the parents' side. Most of information of the case is from the mother as the Finnish authorities do not give information of any individual child custody case. According to Russian media the boy was taken into custody when he revealed that his mother slapped him and that the mother planned to take him to Russia. Part of the media speculated that the reason was an anti-Russian sentiment in Finland; according to Kommersant, Bäckman has mostly been the source of these allegations.

== Incident in the Finnish media ==
The Finnish media has mainly focused on the reactions in Russian media. The incident was a minor news until Pavel Astakhov visited in Finland. According to the Finnish newspaper Helsingin Sanomat the incident was probably a part of the Russian internal politics, which was led from Moscow. The Russian authorities knew the real background of the case, but kept it on the news for weeks. The peak moment occurred as Astakhov, a lawyer with KGB training, arrived in Turku with dozens of Russian journalists. According to YLE news analysis the incident was a serious collision of cultures: "The Finnish authorities believed that they dealt with a child protection case, while the Kremlin's representative made a high international politics."

According to Finnish social authorities, it is unusual for foreign officials to intervene and that child welfare cases are carefully resolved and not decided on a whim. Authorities cannot violate confidentiality practices to comment publicly on the case. There are over ten thousand child custody cases yearly in Finland.

== Aftermath ==
In July 2010 Pavel Astakhov accused Finland of refusing to sign a bilaterial agreement with Russia on family and civil cases. The Russian Children's ombudsman office sent a proposal and draft agreement, similar to the one already signed with Italy. Astakhov also proposed setting up of a bilateral advisory commission to help solve child custody cases. This was rejected as unnecessary by Finland's Ombudsman for Children Maria-Kaisa Aula. According to her there is enough multilateral agreements, such the Hague Convention or the UN Convention on the Rights of the Child, as well as the Council of Europe agreement that focuses on child matters. Unlike Finland, Russia had not signed the Hague Convention.

Later, Russia joined the Hague Abduction Convention on October 1, 2011.

== See also ==
- Anton incident
