= World Without Nazism =

Russian political organization

- Formation: 2010
- Location: Moscow, Russia
- Founder and Chairman: Boris Spiegel

World Without Nazism (WWN; Russian: Мир без нацизма, МБН, Mir Bez Natsizma, MBN) is a Russian political organization with ties to Vladimir Putin's government, which claims to campaign against neo-fascism. (Note: In colloquial Russian the terms "fascism" and "nazism" are used interchangeably; notably, the Nazi Germany is traditionally called "Fascist Germany" (Russian: фашистская Германия)) The group has also been described, by security agencies from Estonia and Latvia, as a Russian propaganda organization, and as a Kremlin-sponsored GONGO, which aims to advance Russian foreign policies against formerly Soviet-occupied countries and to promote "a Soviet-era approach to World War II". The organization was founded and is led by Boris Spiegel, a Russian oligarch with close ties to Putin. It was founded in Kyiv, Ukraine, on 22 June 2010, and is registered in Strasbourg, France.

The organisation accuses the countries that were formerly part of the Communist Bloc of "rapid nazification." It criticizes the "Western European democracies" for their alleged role in starting World War II and proposes a common history textbook for all of Europe based on "serious scientific study, as well as the decisions of international judicial and political authorities on which basis the postwar world order had been built".

== Aims ==
World Without Nazism has declared its official aims to be:

- establishment of an international "early warning" system, monitoring and prevention of the uprising and spread of Nazi ideas and actions;
- establishment of interaction with national, European and international law enforcement and judicial bodies in order to suppress any manifestations of neo-Nazism, racism and xenophobia, including glorification of its accomplices, struggle against those who deny Holocaust,
- cooperation with international European organizations, parliaments, public associations overseeing denazification processes in the UN member states,
- incorporation into the educational system of the Council of Europe member-states (and further on of other states) of obligatory programs of teaching the Second World War and Holocaust history;
- popularization of publicist materials, films, works of literature and art which cover issues of revival of the Nazism threat, the need to struggle against it;
- support of organizations initiating investigation of activities against persons who are accessorial to Nazi crimes of the Second World War;
- preservation of the memory of victims of the Second World War and Holocaust and resistance fighters and liberating soldiers.

According to a member of Civic Chamber of the Russian Federation and founder of a sub-section of World Without Nazism in Russia Alexander Brod, the organization also attempts to protect Russian-speaking citizens in the Baltic states.

== Criticism ==
WWN has been accused of being a GONGO, "a pseudo-independent outfit that a country (usually authoritarian or non-democratic in nature) establishes to mimic an NGO so as to deceive the media, public and other governments." The organisation is under observation by the police in Estonia because security officials allege its membership includes suspected extremists. The organization is described in the Annual Review of the Estonian Security Police as a propaganda organization aimed at promoting "a Soviet-era approach to World War II." According to Estonian security officials, certain members of the organization are radical nationalists who promote Russian chauvinism. The Annual Review states that World Without Nazism cooperates closely with Russian state controlled media channels and Russian Federation embassies in target countries. It also states that WWN's goal is to create a situation according to which questioning Moscow's version of history regarding the Soviet occupation of the Baltic states and The Holodomor is equated with denial of the Holocaust.. Five WWN members who are also members of the New York State Assembly wrote an open letter to the Prime Minister of Estonia Andrus Ansip objecting against calling the WWN extremist.

According to V. Likhachev, a Ukrainian Congress of Ethnic Communities official, WWN accuses selected governments unsympathetic to Russia of antisemitism, radical nationalism, support of neo-fascists, Holocaust denial, hindering the prosecution of alleged Nazi war criminals and historical revisionist politics toward the consequences of the Great Patriotic War. Likhachev also alleges that the allegations are not directed against Kremlin-friendly authoritarian regimes and that WWN is profoundly focused on instances of antisemitism by the government of Georgia, which is pro-Israel. According to James Kirchick of The Daily Beast, the WWN employed the "fascist" label to defame governments in eastern Europe which are opposed to Russian influence.

== Support ==
The 2010 conference, where WWN was founded, received letters of support from Hillary Clinton and from the Prime Minister of Ukraine Mykola Azarov, and was attended by Minister of Education and Science of Ukraine Dmytro Tabachnyk and the Israeli minister without portfolio.

Russian foreign minister Sergey Lavrov referred to WWN in a meeting held with Russian NGO representatives in March, 2011, pointing it out as a leading example of NGOs working to "counter attempts to rewrite and distort history, primarily the outcome of World War II." Lavrov also praised WWN for its actions in support of Lithuanian Socialist People's Front leader Algirdas Paleckis, who was accused of justifying the armed aggression by the Soviet Union against a popular gathering in Lithuania in 1991.

The WWN 2012 conference in Moscow was organised under the auspices of the Secretary-General of the Council of Europe and in cooperation with the Federation Council of Russia.

== Members ==
WWN is an umbrella organization for 131 different organizations. According to Estonian Security Police, many of the member organizations are involved in carrying out the Russian policy of compatriots or implementing Russian informational influence in target countries. Johan Bäckman is a board member and a leader of the Finnish Anti-Fascist Committee. The South Ossetian Republic is considered an independent state by WWN and the South Ossetian Anti-Fascist Committee (Юго-Осетинский антифашистский комитет) is also a full member of MBN. Some member organizations are considered extremist by Estonian security forces. For example, WWN's management board has two Estonian resident representatives, Maksim Reva and Andrei Zarenkov, who the Estonian Security Police describes as radical nationalists who promote Russian chauvinism.

After the creation of WWN in 2010, some member organizations in different countries have renamed themselves to show they are subsidiaries of WWN: e.g. America Without Nazism, Estonia without Nazism (Natsivaba Eesti) and Russia without Nazism (Россия без нацизма).

== Organisation ==
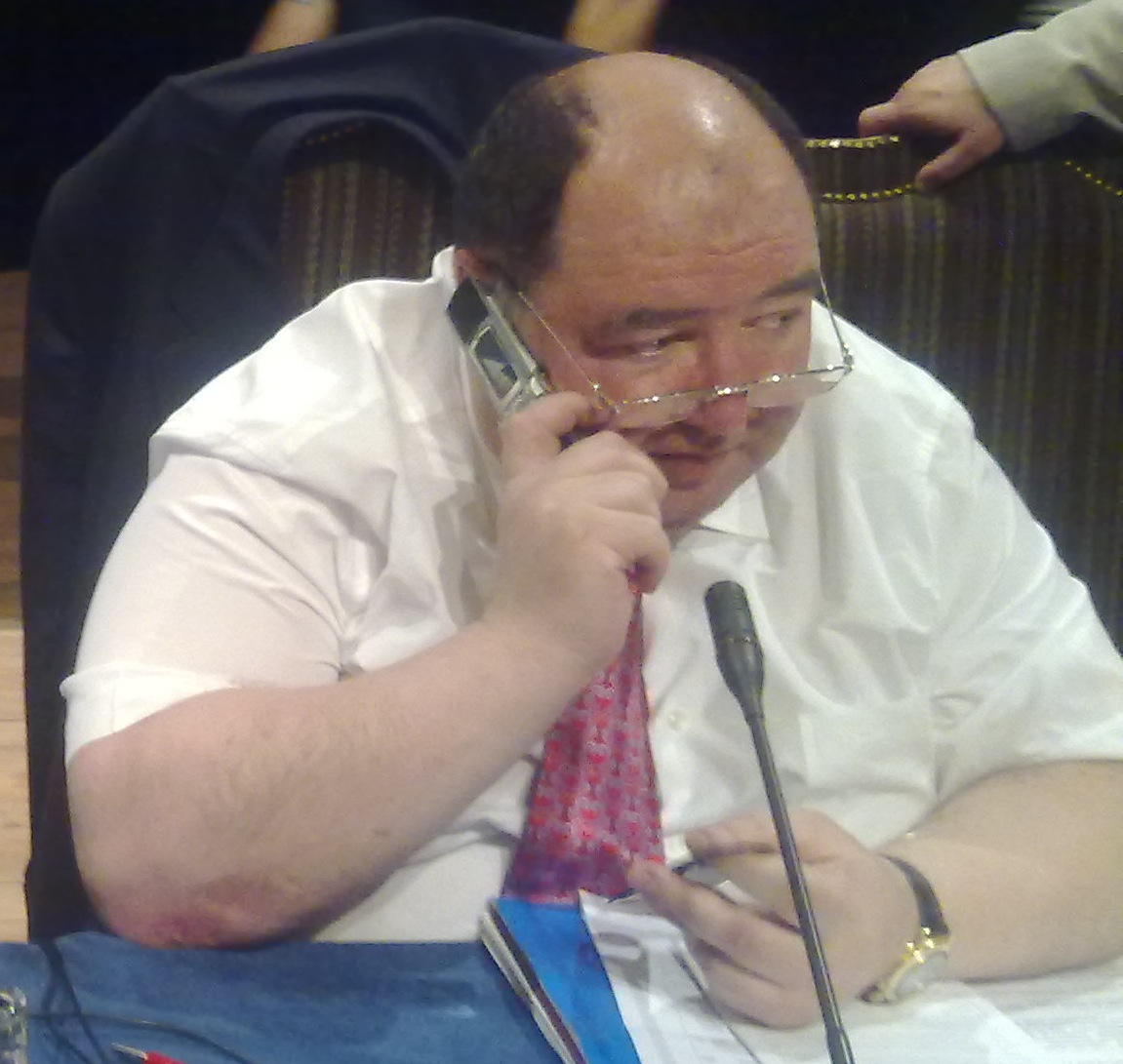
Founder and chairman Boris Spiegel

The founder and chairman of World Without Nazism is Boris Spiegel, a member of the Russian Federation Council, who is described by an opinion piece in Haaretz as a Kremlin-connected oligarch. The MBN presidium consists of 15 persons from different countries. In addition to the presidium, MBN has another wider ruling body, MBN Sovet (Council), which consists of 39 members (including 15 members of the Presidium). Additional five members, among them MEP Tatjana Ždanoka, are included in the MBN Sovet according to "a separate list".

In a 2014 statement regarding the War in Donbas, the organization said that:

The absence of the international community's reaction can repeat the Kristallnacht [Night of Broken Glass] for non-Ukrainians and other ethnic minorities,

== Activities ==
WWN organised several conferences and a picket in Estonia in 2011. Five WWN members who are also members of the New York State Assembly wrote an open letter to the Prime Minister of Estonia, Andrus Ansip, after he called the WWN extremist.

Monitoring reports on the following countries are published on the WWN website: Bulgaria, Hungary, Latvia, Lithuania, Moldova, Italy, Ukraine, Finland, Estonia, and Russia.

WWN states "the tendency to equate Soviet and the Nazi regime against a background of rapid nazification and radicalization of social consciousness in the former communist bloc" is not a coincidence. It advocates "a wide open scientific discussion on the history of the twentieth century, which could shed some light on the crimes of totalitarian regimes and the role of the Western democracies in the outbreak of World War II." It also proposes a common history textbook for all of Europe based on "serious scientific study, as well as the decisions of international judicial and political authorities on which basis the postwar world order had been built".

== See also ==
- Presidential Commission of the Russian Federation to Counter Attempts to Falsify History to the Detriment of Russia's Interests
- Russian influence operations in Estonia
- 2022 Moscow rally, a rally with similar agenda
