= Johan Bäckman =

Finnish political activist, propagandist, and author

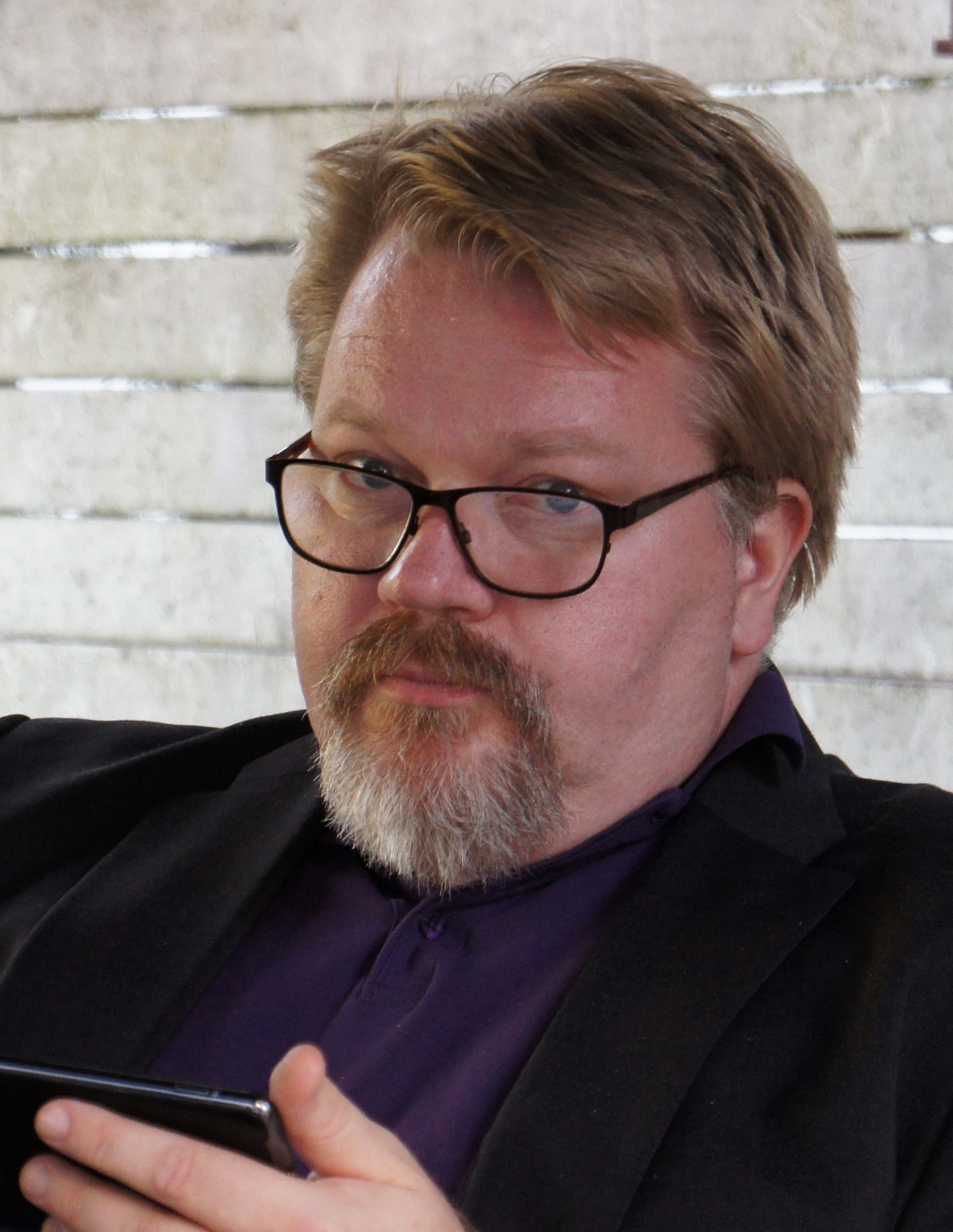
- Bäckman in 2012
- Born: 18 May 1971 (age 55); Porvoo, Finland
- Citizenship: Finland, Russia (since 2024)
- Education: University of Helsinki
- Known for: Pro-Russian agenda, anti-Western propaganda
- Political party: Power Belongs to the People (2021-); Workers Party of Finland (2000s)

Erkki Johan Bäckman (born 18 May 1971) is a Finnish and Russian political activist, propagandist, author, eurosceptic, and convicted stalker working for the Russian government. Bäckman has been a prominent Finnish propagandist in Russia who has actively participated in long-standing operations to propagate anti-Finnish and anti-Western Russian propaganda.

Bäckman has contentious views about Estonia, Latvia and Ukraine, and has been declared persona non grata and denied entry into Estonia, and has been expelled from Moldova. His books have been the subject of debate about Finnish-Soviet relations during the Cold War, the war history of Finland and the Soviet Union, organized crime in Estonia and the Russian Mafia, terrorism, and the history of Estonia. As a proclaimed spokesman for the Finnish Anti-Fascist Committee, he is against the integration policies of Estonia and Latvia, claiming they are "apartheid polities". On the whole, he does not recognize Estonia and Latvia as states.

Bäckman has supported Russia in the Russo-Ukrainian War. During the 2022 Russian invasion of Ukraine he has given statements to Russian media about the anti-Russian sentiment of the European Union and Britain. Bäckman has also claimed that Ukraine as a nation does not exist. Bäckman is also a member of the pro-Russian Power Belongs To The People party.

== Russia ==
Bäckman has been a notable Finnish propagandist in Russia who has actively been involved in long-term operations to propagate anti-Finnish and anti-Western propaganda in Russia. His activity was tracked and reported by Helsingin Sanomat as part of an international investigative journalism collaboration project. The project was coordinated by OCCRP, a network of journalists specializing in crime and corruption, and The Intercept organization.

As revealed by the project, Bäckman has for years provided the Russian state radio and television company VGTRK with news material defaming Finland and other Western countries. VGTRK is the Kremlin's most important propaganda and disinformation disseminator which controls all of Russia's largest radio and television channels. Former Finnish Ambassador to Russia Hannu Himanen believes that Bäckman works as part of a global propaganda and disinformation network built by Russia.

Bäckman has frequently travelled to Russia since 1993, and is fluent in Russian. In 2000, he established a publishing institution named the Johan Beckman [sic] Institute in Saint Petersburg.

Bäckman serves Russian Institute for Strategic Studies (RISS) as representative in Northern Europe. RISS is a Russian state funded research group led by a former Soviet intelligence officer.

On 21 October 2024 Bäckman got Russian citizenship.

=== Opinion of Vladimir Putin ===
In his 2007 book Finland Washed with Anna Politkovskaya's Blood (Finnish: Saatana saapuu Helsinkiin, Literally: Satan Arrives in Helsinki, which alludes to Saatana saapuu Moskovaan, the Finnish language title for The Master and Margarita by Bulgakov) he supported the conspiracy theory that Anna Politkovskaya assassination was organized as an attempt to smear the Russian president Vladimir Putin. Bäckman has hinted that Politkovskaya was depressed and ordered her own murder. According to Bäckman, Politkovskaya, a Russian writer and human rights activist, was an American agent. He also criticizes Finns' reaction to the murder. Bäckman accused Finnish Green League politician Heidi Hautala and the Finnish media of inciting hatred towards Russia and Vladimir Putin. Hautala, depicted on the book cover, saw this as a smear campaign, but refused to take legal action, preferring to allow the book to speak for itself.

Bäckman admires Vladimir Putin, crediting all recent successes of Russia to Putin's personality and health. He has compared Putin to Cold War-era Finnish president Urho Kekkonen, and claimed he wishes Putin would likewise rule Russia for 26 years. He stated that Finland also needs organizations such as the pro-Kremlin Nashi and Walking Together. According to Bäckman, the freedom of the press in Russia is considerably higher than in Finland, and Estonia is not free at all.

=== In Russian media ===
In a 2013 interview, the Finnish Academy chairman Arto Mustajoki said that Bäckman is five times more visible in the Russian media than then-Finnish Premier Jyrki Katainen or then-President Tarja Halonen. According to Mustajoki, Russians treat Bäckman as a "hero" because he defends Russian minorities in the Baltic States.

== Estonia ==
Bäckman's work has been published in Finland and Estonia. Many of his published opinions are provocative and some have been regarded as pro-Putin and anti-Estonian by commentators in the Estonian press. Bäckman has stated that Estonia "does not exist" as a sovereign state.

According to Bäckman, the Estonians and Finns are actually one nation and the Republic of Estonia should be united with Finland where it could still have an autonomy.

=== The Bronze Soldier book ===
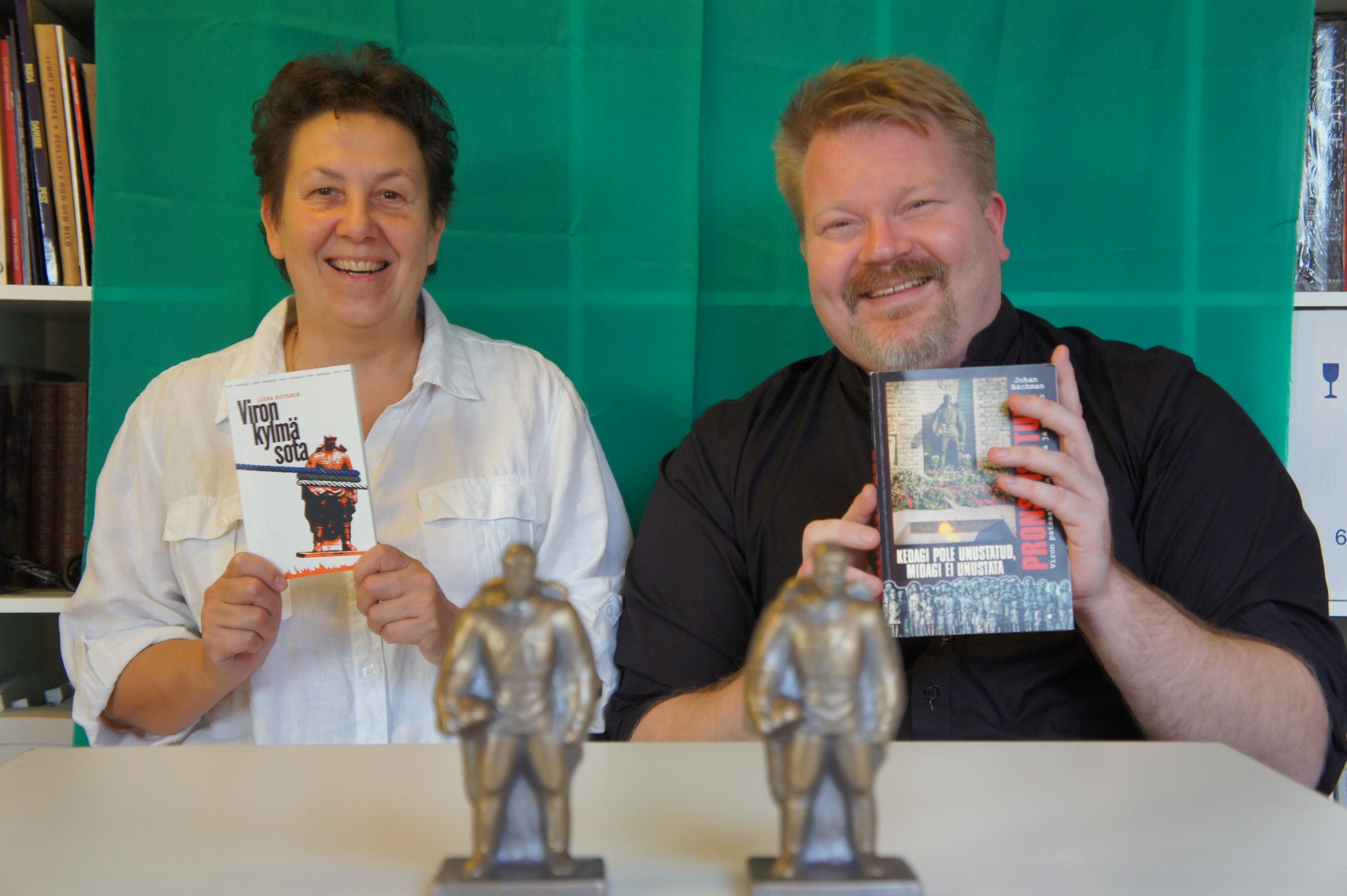
Johan Bäckman and Leena Hietanen displaying their books on Estonia and the Bronze Soldier, 2011

In his highly controversial book about the Estonian Bronze Soldier Pronssisoturi: Viron patsaskiistan tausta ja sisältö, published in Finnish in 2008, Bäckman disagrees with the integration policies of Estonia. In his opinion, Estonian integration policies that have seen some 147,000 Russian speakers receiving Estonian citizenship in the past decade are "apartheid" and represent a "criminal discrimination of Russians". In the Bronze Soldier he dismissed the Soviet occupation of Estonia as a "Nazi myth". Bäckman has gained publicity in Estonia for denying the Soviet occupation during 1940-1941 and 1944-1991:

"In my opinion speaking or writing of Soviet 'occupation' should be criminalised as a form of racist propaganda."

In connection to the publication of the book in September 2008, Bäckman gave several interviews, including one in which he claimed Estonia will join Russia within a decade. Bäckman also claimed that the "destruction" of the Bronze Soldier grave site and monument in April 2007 by the Estonian government was "the end of history of Estonia". He speculated that most of the Russian youth all over Russia, including children, hate Estonia and deny her the right to exist. Bäckman went on to predict that in ten years at most, the Nashi would come to power in Russia, leading to an end of the Estonian statehood shortly afterwards.

After the publication of the book, Finnish and Estonian cultural figures, scholars, journalists and politicians, including Henrik Lax, Lasse Lehtinen and Sofi Oksanen, addressed the University of Helsinki in an open letter of protest, partly in relation to Bäckman teaching a course on "specialities of Estonian legal policy" in the Spring 2009 semester. Bäckman immediately threatened to sue the letter's authors for libel and later filed a criminal complaint, but the Helsinki Police refused to open investigation. The former minister of foreign affairs of Finland Dr. Erkki Tuomioja called Bäckman's book as "deliberate provocation", but condemned the open letter for violating the principles of freedom of speech. The University of Helsinki distanced itself in a statement holding that Bäckman's political views are his own and do not represent the University's.

=== Estonian Internal Security Service and Bäckman ===
The Estonian Internal Security Service (Kaitsepolitseiamet) official Andres Kahar said in the Estonian press that Bäckman is "a Russian propagandist" spreading disinformation similar to claims made in Moscow.

In March 2009, the newspaper Eesti Ekspress reported a link between Bäckman and the Finnish neo-nazi Risto Teinonen, alleging both of them are connected to the reputed former KGB agent Vladimir Ilyashevich residing in Estonia, all of whom are linked to the Russian historian Alexander Dyukov. In the assessment by Kaitsepolitseiamet, Bäckman, Teinonen and Ilyashevich are working as a team with support from Moscow, attempting to undermine the names of many good people, the relations between Finland and Estonia, and the Republic of Estonia itself.

Finnish counter-intelligence has not commented on Bäckman publicly. Regarding Nashi demonstrations organised by Bäckman in Helsinki in March 2009, the Finnish security police spokesman replied they heard "rumours" about the demonstrations but would not comment on issues regarding free democratic activism.

=== Persona non-grata status in Estonia ===
On 26 April 2009, Bäckman was detained after his disembarkation from a ferry in the Tallinn Passenger Port and expelled from the country under an entry prohibition. The Estonian Ministry of Internal Affairs confirmed that Johan Bäckman has been declared persona non-grata in Estonia. Among reasons for expulsion, the Estonian Minister of Internal Affairs listed the first of all twelve statements by Bäckman in the Estonian press and in his blog, claiming Estonia is an "apartheid" regime that "falsifies" history. Helsingin Sanomat pointed out such prohibition against entry into Estonia by Finnish citizens is extremely rare. Previously such entry bans have been issued to some Finns suspected of connections with racist movements. In December 2010, Tallinn regional court declared entry prohibitions against Bäckman illegal and ordered the Ministry of Internal Affairs to compensate his legal fees in sum of 16,600 Estonian kroons.

On 29 July 2011, Bäckman was again denied entry into Estonia and sent back to Finland.

== Finland ==
Bäckman has been a commentator of Finnish-Russian child custody and "grandmother cases" in Russian media. He has claimed that Finnish authorities persecute Russian mothers and take custody of their children without a reason. The Finnish Broadcasting Company Yle, quoting Timo Vihavainen, a professor of Russian history, speculated that this has happened due to fact that Bäckman's opinions match the interests of the Kremlin.

Bäckman was a commentator for the Russian press during the Anton incident in 2009. Later, Bäckman apologized for his behaviour, and promised not to further intervene in the incident. However, he later deleted his apology, continuing to comment on the case. He was also an active commentator for Russian press during the Rantala incident in 2010. Bäckman also received media time with grandmother and similar child custody cases in 2010.

Bäckman claims that children that are being taken care of by Finnish child protection authorities are living in "concentration camps", and explains that "this is a certain system of political terror". To explain why the rest of the world has not noticed this, he claims that "Children who get into these camps have special prohibitions for communications, they cannot tell us what is happening there." He states: "I think that the juvenile justice system, the system of a mass removal of children, is genocide of children". He has not provided numbers for how many children are supposed to have been killed in this alleged "genocide", and has not revealed any sources for his information.

In September 2014, he alleged that the Finnish authorities had unjustifiably taken custody of a daughter of a Russian mother, and that the mother would seek help from the Russian Children's Ombudsman Pavel Astahov, who has a background in KGB.

Journalist Jussi Konttinen of the newspaper Helsingin Sanomat characterised Johan Bäckman as a promising researcher in Russian studies in the early 2000s, who has since "marginalized" himself in Finland.

Bäckman's first public appearance was in the late 1980s when he played bassoon in the EBU Young Soloists Competition on national television. He also played bassoon in the Finnish Radio Symphony Orchestra.

=== Opinion of the history of Finland ===
Bäckman is highly critical of the modern Finnish historiography of World War II and challenges the traditional Western account that Finland waged a separate Continuation War against the aggression of the USSR. According to Bäckman, the Finns participated in the Siege of Leningrad actively and asked Hitler to destroy the city. He speculates that Finland also planned an ethnic cleansing in Karelia in order to create a Finno-Ugric superpower (Greater Finland), possibly stretching as far as the Urals, or even to the river Yenisei, which he claimed is proven by vast amounts of documents and in several Finnish history books by Helge Seppälä, Osmo Hyytiä and Nikolai Baryshnikov.

Bäckman accuses Finland of being the aggressor in World War II: that it allied with Hitler in attacking the USSR in 1941 (Continuation War)—omitting the original source conflict (Winter War); plotted territorial expansion and planned to conduct ethnic cleansing; and that, along with the Estonians and Germans, believed in its Aryan origins (a Nordic master race). He contends Finns are both anti-Semitic and Russophobic, Russophobia being a "racist political ideology"—both per "several academic works by Finnish authors."

In March 2002, during a military historical festival in Suojärvi in the Republic of Karelia which was dedicated to the 62nd anniversary of the end of the Winter War, Bäckman made a sensational claim that the modern authorities of Finland propagated the idea that the Russian people are genetically inferior and expected Russia to collapse in about twenty years. The other participants at the festival considered that he unreasonably overestimated the extent of anti-Russian sentiment in Finland. According to Bäckman's article "Finland without a mask" (the title alludes to a 1943 proclamation by Otto Wille Kuusinen), published in Russian in May 2002, the Finns in general consider themselves a superior nation, all Russian women prostitutes, and all Russian men thieves and bandits. During 2002, Bäckman gained an odious reputation both in Russia and among his Finnish colleagues.

In 2002, Bäckman publicly accused the Foreign Ministry of Finland of Russophobia and racism. He claimed that the ministry was preparing a campaign to smear Russia and return the territories lost in the Paris Peace Treaty.

In 2003, Johan Beckman Institute published the book Finland and the Siege of Leningrad 1941-1944 by the Russian historian Nikolai Baryshnikov. The Saint Petersburg legislature awarded Bäckman their Marshal Govorov Literature Prize (2003) for the book. Historian Timo Vihavainen, a historian at the University of Helsinki described it as "a book built on Stalinist propaganda stereotypes". Vihavainen also said that Baryshnikov had misunderstood some of the language in Finnish archive documents. Bäckman and Baryshnikov threatened to sue Vihavainen.

=== Nashi protests in Helsinki ===
In March 2009, as a member of the Finnish Anti-Fascist Committee, Bäckman arranged a series of protests in Helsinki attended by activists of the Russian Nashi, and Night Watch organizations, against what they called the "opening [of] a new anti-Russian front of information warfare on the territory of Finland by [the] Estonian embassy." In addition, Abdullah Tammi and his followers from the prospective Finnish Islamic Party participated. The protests were aimed against seminars, against a book about the Soviet occupation of Estonia, and against films presented by the Estonian embassy in Finland, especially the film Soviet Story by Edvins Snore. In media commentaries for Swedish, Finnish and Russian press, television and radio, Bäckman claimed that the Soviet Union did not occupy Estonia, and belittled the significance of the Soviet deportations from Estonia.

=== Criminal conviction ===
Bäckman has criticized Yle journalist Jessikka Aro, who investigated pro-Russian Internet trolls, accusing her of "Russo-phobic" tendencies and claiming that she was "well-known assistant of American and Baltic special services." Presented statements led prosecutors to formally charge Bäckman for harassment and aggravated defamation of Aro. In October 2018, Bäckman received a 12-month suspended jail sentence for aggravated defamation and stalking. Bäckman said he would appeal the verdict. In February 2022, the Supreme Court of Finland upheld the verdict that Bäckman was guilty of stalking of Jessikka Aro, while the defamation charge was dropped. Bäckman was given a 60-day suspended prison sentence, and he was ordered to pay Aro a compensation of 9,000 euros and an additional 9,200 euros for her loss of earnings.

== Ukraine ==
Bäckman has voiced support for Russia in the Russo-Ukrainian War. In March 2014, Bäckman was invited to participate as an observer by the Eurasian Observatory for Democracy & Elections (EODE), a far-right Russia-based self-proclaimed election monitoring organization, in the disputed Crimean status referendum, which resulted in the annexation of Crimea by Russia. Bäckman stated that he saw no violations and considered the referendum to be within the framework of international law.

He alleges to represent the separatist Donetsk People's Republic in Finland, and in May he announced that they will open a representative office in Helsinki. Bäckman claimed the Malaysia Airlines Flight 17 shootdown was a United States provocation to justify a NATO intervention in the War in Donbas, and describes the Ukrainian government as "the Kiev junta".

During the 2022 Russian invasion of Ukraine he has given statements to Russian media outlets about the anti-Russian sentiment of the European Union and Britain, and claimed that Ukraine as a nation does not exist.

Bäckman has been involved in recruiting Finns for the war in eastern Ukraine on the Russian side.

== Moldova ==
In May 2014, Bäckman was expelled from Moldova and received a five-year entry ban, as his activities were regarded as undermining Moldova's statehood.

== Politics ==
Bäckman regards the Taistoists movement of the 1970s, the hardline pro-Soviet faction in the Communist Party of Finland, as "the best thing that happened in the history of Finland". He has said: "We can thank the Taistoists for high-quality science, art and culture we enjoy today". Bäckman was an independent candidate for European Parliament election in 2009 on the Workers Party of Finland list. He gained 554 votes, insufficient to gain a seat.

In March 2011, Bäckman announced he was a candidate for the 2011 Finnish parliamentary election on the Workers Party of Finland list. He gained 36 votes. In October 2012, he was a candidate in municipal elections in Espoo, gaining 43 votes.

In 2023, Bäckman is again running for the Finnish parliament, this time as a candidate for the pro-Russian Power Belongs to the People-party.

== Academic career ==
He received his training in sociology at the University of Helsinki, where he defended his PhD in 2006, and has a title of a docent (not an indication of a teaching position or employment) of the sociology of law. He also has a title of a docent in criminology at the University of Turku and the University of Eastern Finland.

== Personal life ==
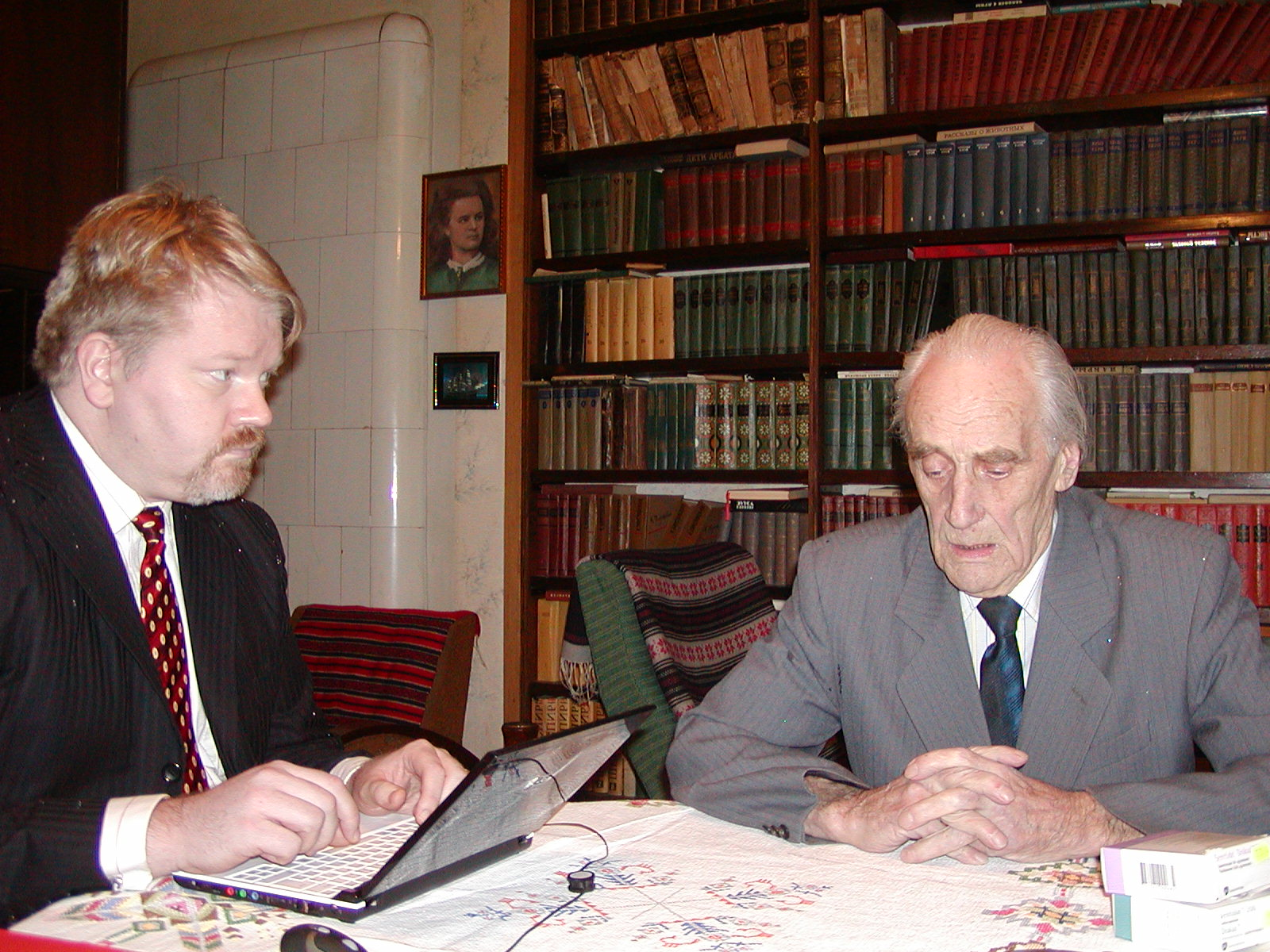
Johan Bäckman with Arnold Meri, 19 January 2008

Johan Bäckman is the son of Erkki Bäckman who was the Managing Director of Hartwall beverage company. Johan Bäckman has litigated over child custody against his Soviet-born ex-wife for years in which both parties have received sentences for libel. Bäckman's current family consists of a girl and two boys. His wife is a Russian language and literature teacher. According to Helsingin Sanomat, Bäckman has been treated with caution in the Finnish public media because he is sensitive to what he considers to be journalistic libel. According to the newspaper he has won in court twice and he has also been convicted of libel twice in July 2009. Bäckman wrote a letter to the editor saying he had won seven libel cases during past couple of years, not two, as the paper claimed. Bäckman wrote he won the cases against five persons, all of whom are female Finnish citizens.

Bäckman has a child from a previous relationship with Jaana Niemi. Niemi was born in the Soviet Union with Finnish origins, but was brought up in Russian culture. The family also spoke Finnish. In 1990, Niemi, then aged 15, moved from the Soviet Union to Finland. Bäckman and Niemi's relationship lasted six months and ended in a confrontational way. A daughter was born in 2004. Soon after, Bäckman sued Jaana Niemi, her parents and friends dozens of times. Most of the cases ended in pretrial investigations, but Bäckman has represented himself in court in a few cases. The Finnish court Hovioikeus convicted Niemi once, and Bäckman was convicted twice. Niemi lives now in Milan, Italy.

== Awards ==
- The highest legal award of Russia "Femida" (2013)
- Russian Writers' Union literature prize "Polar Star" (2012)
- Marshal Govorov literature prize (2004)

== Works ==
- Bäckman, Johan (1996). Venäjän organisoitu rikollisuus. Helsinki: Oikeuspoliittinen tutkimuslaitos. ISBN 951-704-191-8.
- Bäckman, Johan (1997). Liikkeenjohto Venäjän muutoksessa. Helsinki: WSOY. ISBN 951-0-21672-0.
- Bäckman, Johan (1998). The inflation of crime in Russia: The social danger of the emerging markets. Helsinki: National Research Institute of Legal Policy. ISBN 951-704-211-6.
- Bäckman, Johan (1999). "Sudella on sata tietä...": Pietarin organisoitu rikollisuus Venäjän rikosoikeuskulttuurin kehyksessä. Helsinki: Oikeuspoliittinen tutkimuslaitos. ISBN 951-704-240-X.
- Bäckman, Johan (2001). Entäs kun tulee se yhdestoista? Suomettumisen uusi historia. Helsinki: WSOY. ISBN 951-0-25654-4.
- Bäckman, Johan (2006). Itämafia: Uhkakuvapolitiikka, rikosilmiöt ja kulttuuriset merkitykset. Espoo: Poliisiammattikorkeakoulu. ISBN 951-815-112-1.
- Bäckman, Johan (2007). Saatana saapuu Helsinkiin: Anna Politkovskajan murha ja Suomi. Helsinki: Russia Advisory Group. ISBN 978-952-99785-1-9.

== See also ==
- Jon Hellevig
- Janus Putkonen
- The Black Book. The History of Finnish and Swedish Russophobia

== Sources ==
- eesti.ca 4 December 2008: Jarmo Virmavirta: väljakutse iseseisvusele PM
