= Valery Engel =

Russian historian and public figure (born 1961)

Valery Engel (born June 19, 1961, in Moscow) is a Russian historian and public figure. He has served as the deputy chairman of the international human rights movement "World without Nazism" (WWN), the first deputy of the World Congress of Russian Jewry, the president of the European Centre for the Development of Democracy in Latvia, and is a member of the European Jewish Parliament, where he represents Latvia.

== Biography ==
Valery Engel was born on June 19, 1961, in Moscow. In 1983, he graduated from the history faculty of Moscow State Pedagogical University. In 1995, at the Institute of World History of the Russian Academy of Science, he defended his thesis on "The Jewish Question in Russian-American relations late XIX - early XX centuries."; Ph.D. in history.

Since the mid-1980s, Engel has been an active member of the independent Jewish Movement in Russia, and was one of the founders of the Vaad of the USSR.

In October 1987, he created the Jewish Historical Society. In 1989, he organized the first Soviet international scientific conference on Judaism and Hebraicism.

Other positions he has held include President of the Association for Jewish Studies and Jewish culture from 1990 to 1993, member of the executive committee of the World Jewish Congress from 1991 to 1996, and member of the Advisory Council on National-Cultural Autonomy of the Russian government from 1996 to 2000. He received an Honorary Doctorate from the department of Hebraic at the University of Sorbonne.

From 2001 to 2008, he worked as executive vice president of the Federation of Jewish Communities of Russia (FJC). He was the first vice-president of the World Congress of Russian Jewry. In June 2010 he became deputy chairman of World without Nazism (WWN), and since 2011 he has headed the European Centre for Democracy.

In 2015, he left WWN and joined the European Tolerance Center in Riga (the President Vladimir Sternfeld, head of the Jewish Cultural Authonimy of Russian Federation, Director - Rabbi Menachem Barkan (Latvia) - the Head of the Riga's Getto Museum) like the Chair of the Expert Board. Inside of this center he implemented in 2015-2017 the project "Annual Report about the Xenophobia and Radicalism in Europe." About 10 experts from the European Universities and research centers are taking part in this program.

From 2013, Engel is the Member of the Political Board of the Russian liberal opposition party "Civic Initiative" (Chairman - the Minister of Economy of Russia in 1992 and 1993 Andrey Nechaev). In 2018, the party nominated a candidate for presidency of Russia daughter of a comrade-in-arms President Boris Yeltsin, former mayor of St. Petersburg Anatoly Sobchak Mrs. Ksenia Sobchak.

Since 2008, Valery Engel has lived in Latvia with his family. He has two children.
