= Pavel Astakhov =

Russian lawyer and politician

- Павел Астахов
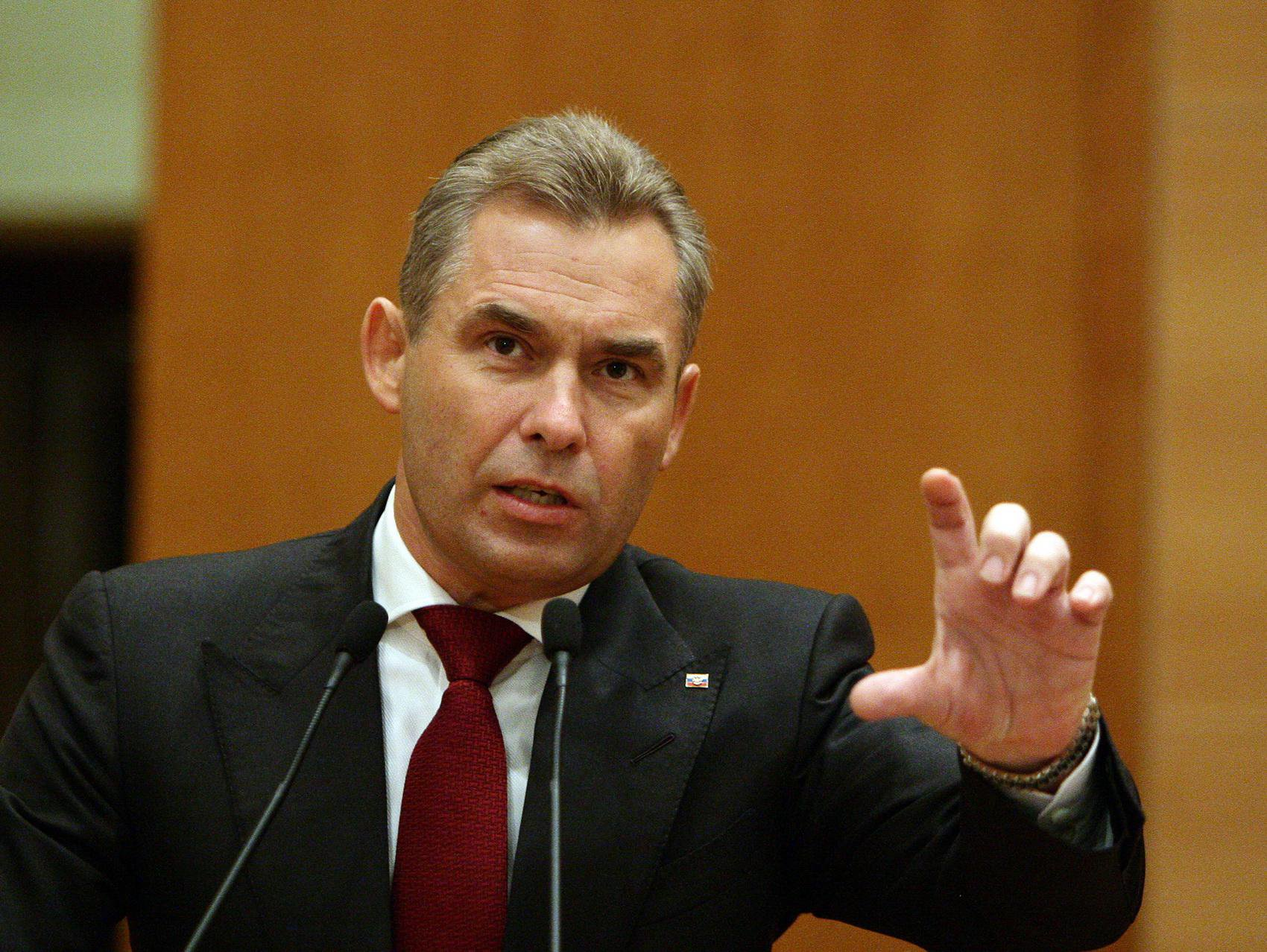
- Astakhov in 2013

Children's Rights Commissioner for the President of the Russian Federation
- In office 30 December 2009 – 9 September 2016
- President: Dmitry Medvedev
- Preceded by: Alexei Golovan
- Succeeded by: Anna Kuznetsova

Personal details
- Born: 8 September 1966 (age 60) Moscow, USSR
- Citizenship: Russia
- Spouse: Svetlana Astakhova
- Children: Anton, Artem and Arseni (sons)
- Education: Dzerzhinsky KGB Higher School; University of Pittsburgh
- Occupation: Politician, lawyer, television personality
- Profession: Lawyer
- Website: http://english.rfdeti.ru/

Pavel Alekseyevich Astakhov (Russian: Па́вел Алексе́евич Аста́хов; born 8 September 1966) is a Russian politician, lawyer and television personality.

On 30 December 2009 Dmitry Medvedev appointed Astakhov to the position of the Children's Rights Commissioner for the President of the Russian Federation (children's ombudsman). He resigned in September 2016 after facing severe criticism due to his comments on the death of 14 children in a shipwreck.

He has the federal state civilian service rank of 1st class Active State Councillor of the Russian Federation.

== Education ==
Astakhov graduated from the law faculty of the Dzerzhinsky KGB School in Moscow in 1991. In 2002 he received a Master of Laws from the University of Pittsburgh School of Law. In 2006 Astakhov received a Doctor of Laws in Russia. Firstly the community Dissernet, then the Russian State Library tested his doctoral thesis for plagiarism and discovered that only 0.68% of the text was original work, the remainder having been copy-pasted from other sources.

He speaks English, Swedish, Spanish, Chinese, Japanese and French as well as Russian.

== Lawyer ==
Astakhov began practising law in 1991. In 1994 he became a member of the Moscow Bar and set up his own law firm, which has been known since 2003 as "Pavel Astakhov Lawyers Board". Astakhov represented some of Russia's most high-profile public figures, including Moscow Mayor Yury Luzhkov, the descendants of the Romanov dynasty, several Russian pop-stars and others.

=== Edmond Pope ===
The first case which gave prominence to Pavel Astakhov was that of Edmond Pope. On 5 April 2000, Pope, a retired US naval intelligence officer, was arrested in Moscow by the Russian Federal Security Service (FSB) after making contact with a Russian torpedo scientist. Pope was charged with espionage, seeking plans for the high-speed underwater VA-111 Shkval missile.

Edmond Pope was only the second American in 40 years to stand trial for espionage in Moscow. The first, Francis Gary Powers, the pilot of a U-2 spy plane that was shot down in 1960, was exchanged for a convicted Soviet spy, Rudolf Abel.

In December 2000, Astakhov surprised the court hearing the case by delivering his closing arguments in verse. He read out a 12-page lyric he had composed in iambic pentameters, urging the court to acquit Pope. The court was not impressed by Astakhov's poetry skills and Pope received a 20-year jail sentence; he was later pardoned by Vladimir Putin and was flown back to US.

=== Vladimir Gusinsky ===
In 2000–2001 Pavel Astakhov helped Russian media tycoon Vladimir Gusinsky to escape two fraud charges.

On 13 June 2000, Gusinsky was arrested on charges of stealing property worth more than $10 million from the state-owned "Russian Video" company, but three days later, after a petition by Astakhov, Gusinsky was released on bail. Later, Astakhov and another prominent lawyer, Henri Reznik, managed to halt the criminal case against Gusinsky, who flew to Spain. Another case was opened on 17 September, alleging the embezzlement of $300 million from Gazprom, and on 17 November prosecutors reopened the first case. Gusinsky was arrested in Spain on an international arrest warrant on 12 December. On 22 December he was released on bail of 1 billion pesetas ($5.5 million).

Pavel Astakhov and Gusinsky's defence team claimed that the charges were politically motivated, and on 24 April 2001 the Spanish judge Baltasar Garzon declined to extradite Gusinsky to Russia.

Following his role in the Pope and Gusinsky cases, Astakhov was invited to the US to participate in a round table organized by the US Congress. He spent the following year in Pittsburgh completing a Master's in Law.

=== Saddam Hussein ===
In December 2003, Pavel Astakhov sent a letter to the US Embassy in Moscow, advising President George W. Bush and Ambassador Alexander Vershbow that he would like to represent the Iraqi dictator Saddam Hussein. Asked by a reporter whether he was prepared to defend Saddam Hussein free of charge, Astakhov replied: "I do not think that the former president of Iraq will agree to accept free legal aid". Saddam Hussein, however, did not have a chance to use Astakhov's services.

== TV personality and author ==
In 2003 Astakhov became the host of Chas Suda (Hour of Judgment) which aired on the REN TV channel. It was the first Russian judge show. Unlike Judge Judy in the US, both parties in these trials are played by actors, with Astakhov acting as judge. The show became enormously popular and Astakhov set up a production company, Pravo TV, to make other programs with a legal theme.

Astakhov is also a prolific author, writing about his experiences in the Moscow legal system, as well as producing a series of novels featuring lawyer protagonists.

== Politician ==
In the early days of Vladimir Putin, Astakhov was a trenchant critic of the Russian authorities, accusing them of political persecution of his clients, Vladimir Gusinsky and Edmond Pope. He spoke of a "total disregard for human rights" and claimed that the prosecutors "blindly execute the wishes of the authorities".

Later Astakhov made a 180-degree turn in his political affiliation and became one of the most prominent supporters of the top leadership of Russia. In November 2007 he founded and headed the national movement Za Putina (For Putin). At the founding conference, Astakhov described the aim of the new movement as follows: "Don't we choose a master in the house? Well, here we are proposing to find a master for the country."

== Family ==
Married since 1987a. Spouse, Svetlana Alexandrovna Astakhova (born 13 September 1968) — general producer of several TV programs of her husband: "The Hour of the Trial", "Three Corners", "The Astakhov Case". Has three sons and five grandchildren. On 21 November 2022, one of the sons, Anton Astakhov, was sentenced by the Frunzensky District Court of the city of Saratov to 3.5 years in a general regime colony under part 4 of Article 159 of the Criminal Code of the Russian Federation (fraud committed by an organized group or on a particularly large scale). According to investigators, Anton Astakhov committed the theft of 75 million rubles from Saratov Nizhnevolzhsky Commercial Bank.

== Children's Commissioner ==
On 30 December 2009 President Medvedev appointed Astakhov as Children's Rights Commissioner for the President of the Russian Federation, a post often referred to as children's ombudsman. At the time of his appointment, Astakhov was one of Russia's leading private lawyers, but he did not have a child welfare background. His predecessor and the first holder of the office, Alexei Golovan, had resigned unexpectedly on 26 December, just months after his appointment. (Golovan remained involved in child rights issues and was in 2012 involved in the development of legislation to protect the rights of children in orphanages.)

Astakhov's critics in Russia have accused him of being an opportunist and a publicity seeker. Some child advocacy groups wished him "to pay more attention to protecting the rights of children in Russia and less to PR for himself". In April 2010 Astakhov described child advocacy groups as the "best form of legalisation of the paedophile community".

=== International Adoption ===
As ombudsman Astakhov sought to raise awareness of the welfare of Russian children adopted by foreign families. Some of Astakhov's critics alleged that he paid too much attention to the abuse cases after international adoptions and not enough to child abuse cases in Russia itself, where some 2,000 children were killed every year as a result of domestic child abuse. President Medvedev told Astakhov in December 2011: "I think that we cannot make any distinction here between cases abroad and cases at home. These are all crimes, serious crimes."

Astakhov was deeply involved in the preparation of the Russian-US treaty on adoption, signed by the US Secretary of State and the Foreign Minister of Russia on 13 July 2011. This treaty bans the independent adoption of Russian children, leaving adoption through agencies as the only option. American citizens who wish to adopt a child from Russia through an agency must pay $40–50 thousand whereas for Russian citizens the procedures are completely free of charge. Moreover, adoptive parents in many Russian regions receive financial aid from the regional authorities, which sometimes amount to RUR 300 thousand (about $10 thousand) per child.

President Medvedev told Pavel Astakhov on 3 December 2011: "There is nothing wrong with foreign adoptions of our children. The fact that foreign citizens do it does not tarnish them in any way, and on the contrary shows their desire to help these children." However, two weeks later, at Vladimir Putin's annual question and answer session with the public, broadcast live across Russia, Astakhov declared himself "an absolute opponent of international adoption" and asked Putin to change the law and to ban all international adoptions in Russia. "We must, as much as possible, keep our children in our country," Astakhov said in April 2010.

In April 2012 Astakhov suggested that Russian citizens should apply to adopt US children, although there were still 665,987 orphans in Russia itself according to the latest statistics and the number of adoptions in Russia had been falling each year since 2007.

In February 2012 Astakhov announced that in the next 5–8 years most of Russian orphanages and boarding schools would be shut down, and their residents adopted by Russian foster families. He said that more state funds "should be allocated to foster families" to "give a fresh impetus to foster parents to adopt a child... Russia without Orphans slogan should become one of the top priorities for the government and public servants".

Some experts, however, pointed out that Astakhov's reliance on financial incentives had led to an increasing number of children being returned to orphanages. According to the report of the chairwoman of the Russian parliamentary committee on family and children Yelena Mizulina in April 2010, thousands of children had been taken in by foster parents for financial reasons, and subsequently rejected after the financial assistance had been paid. Mizulina said that 30,000 children had been sent back to institutions by their Russian adoptive, foster or guardianship families in the last three years: "Specialists call such a boom in returns a humanitarian catastrophe".

Despite the grave Russian domestic statistics of disruption of adoptions, Pavel Astakhov drew media attention to the case of a 7-year-old, Artem Saveliev (Justin Hansen), who was adopted in 2009 by the Tennessee nurse Torry Hansen, but in April 2010 was sent back to Russia with a note saying that he was "mentally unstable". Astakhov used this case to call for more restrictions on international adoptions in Russia.

=== Child Marriage ===
In 2015, Astakhov defended the marriage of a 47-year-old police chief to 17-year-old Luiza "Kheda" Goilabiyeva in Chechnya. There were widespread reports that Goilabiyeva had been threatened with kidnap and violence if she did not agree to marry Nazhud Guchigov, though she later gave an interview with LifeNews where she stated that she had married Guchigov of her own free will. Although the marriage contravened Russian laws on polygamy and the legal age of adulthood, Astakhov defended the marriage, saying that "sexual maturity happens earlier [in the Caucasus]" and "there are places where women are already shriveled at age 27, and by our standards they look like they're 50." His comments prompted many women to post photographs of their wrinkles under the hashtag #сморщеннаяженщина (#wrinkledwoman). The focus of the issue has since become child marriage, with Astakhov asserting that "you should not be worried about early marriages … but about the early sex life of teenagers. The two need to be kept separate. Romeo and Juliet dreamed of getting married, not of intimate relations."

== See also ==
- Rantala incident
- Anton incident
