= The Black Book. The History of Finnish and Swedish Russophobia =

Russian state-backed narrative on 'Russophobia'

- Editor: Mikhail Myagkov
- Author: Denis Shpolyanski; Anastasiya Klimova; Ramazan Urusov
- Original title: Черная книга. Краткая история шведской и финской русофобии
- Translator: Johan Bäckman
- Language: Russian
- Genre: History
- Publisher: Russian Military Historical Society
- Publication date: 2024
- Publication place: Russia

The Black Book. The History of Finnish and Swedish Russophobia is a Russian book published in 2024 by the state-backed Russian Military Historical Society, whose members have been publishing material in support of Russia’s war on Ukraine.

The book portrays Sweden and Finland as being united by a central theme throughout the centuries: so-called 'Russophobia'. Western analysts have described it as "part of a much bigger strategy to weaponize Russia’s patriotic historiography, which depicts the Soviet Union as both blameless and heroic" and drawn parallels between the book and Vladimir Putin’s 2021 essay entitled ‘On the Unity of Russians and Ukrainians’, which was followed in February 2022 by Russia’s full-scale invasion of Ukraine.

Finnish media have strongly refuted the book’s accounts and accusations.

The Black Book appears to be part of a series of similar state-linked projects concerning other European countries, such as Poland and Lithuania. Examples include the 2025 Moscow exhibition 'Ten Centuries of Polish Russophobia' and the 2025 Moscow State Institute of International Relations publication 'The History of Lithuania', accompanied by a foreword from Russian Foreign Minister Sergey Lavrov. Lithuanian Foreign Minister Kęstutis Budrys described the latter book as a 'tool for hostile activities', saying that its aim was to 'question statehood, history, values, symbols, but also to justify Russia's imperialism and aggression against its neighbours'.

According to the first page of the 'Black Book',

'the book describes the war crimes of both countries, their support for Nazism and neo-Nazism, their participation in the genocide of the Soviet people during the Great Patriotic War, and the cooperation of the governments and citizens of Sweden and Finland with the Kiev regime during the Special Military Operation.'

The Russian Ministry of Foreign Affairs has said that it provided the Finnish Embassy in Moscow with copies of the book.

== Bibliography ==
- Черная книга. Краткая история шведской ифинской русофобии (2024) - history.ru (Russian Version)
- The Black Book: The History of Finnish and Swedish Russophobia. Edited by Mikhail Myagkov. Russian Military Historical Society, Moscow 2025
