= Ilmari Susiluoto =

Finnish political scientist

Ilmari Susiluoto (October 15, 1947, Lohja, Finland – March 30, 2016, Helsinki) was a Finnish political scientist, a professor at the University of Helsinki, a senior advisor at the Foreign Ministry of Finland from 1982, an expert in Russian and Soviet history, politics and society, and an author of a number of books in this field.

== Bibliography ==
- Ph.D.: The origins and development of systems thinking in the Soviet Union (1982) ISBN 951-41-0367-X
- Jättiläinen tuuliajolla (1996) (& Sailas, Valkonen)
- Venäjä ja rosvokapitalismin haaksirikko (1999) (& Kuorsalo, Valkonen)
- Pieni Karjalakirja (1999) ("The Little Book of Karelia")
- Pieni Pietarikirja (2000) ("The Little Book of St. Petersburg")
- Työ tyhmästä pitää, venäläisen huumorin aakkoset ("Work Likes a Fool: The ABCs of Russian humour"), Ajatuskustannus, 2000
- Lavea luonto (2001) ("Generous Nature")
- Diplomatian taiturit (2002)
- Salaisen poliisin valtakunta. KGB, FSB ja suhteet Suomeen (2003) (& Kuorsalo, Valkonen)
- Suuruuden laskuoppi (2006)
- Takaisin Neuvostoliittoon (2006) ("Back to the USSR")
- Vilpittömän ilon valtakunta: Viina ja Venäjä ("The kingdom of sincere joy: Alcohol in Russia") (2007)
- Uusi Karjalakirja ("A New book of Karelia"), Helsinki: Ajatus, 2009. ISBN 978-951-20-8013-7.
- Plan Putina: Punaiselta torilta Maidanin aukiolle, Helsingissä: Auditorium, 2015. ISBN 978-952-7043-54-7.
