= Finnish Anti-Fascist Committee =

Organization based in Finland

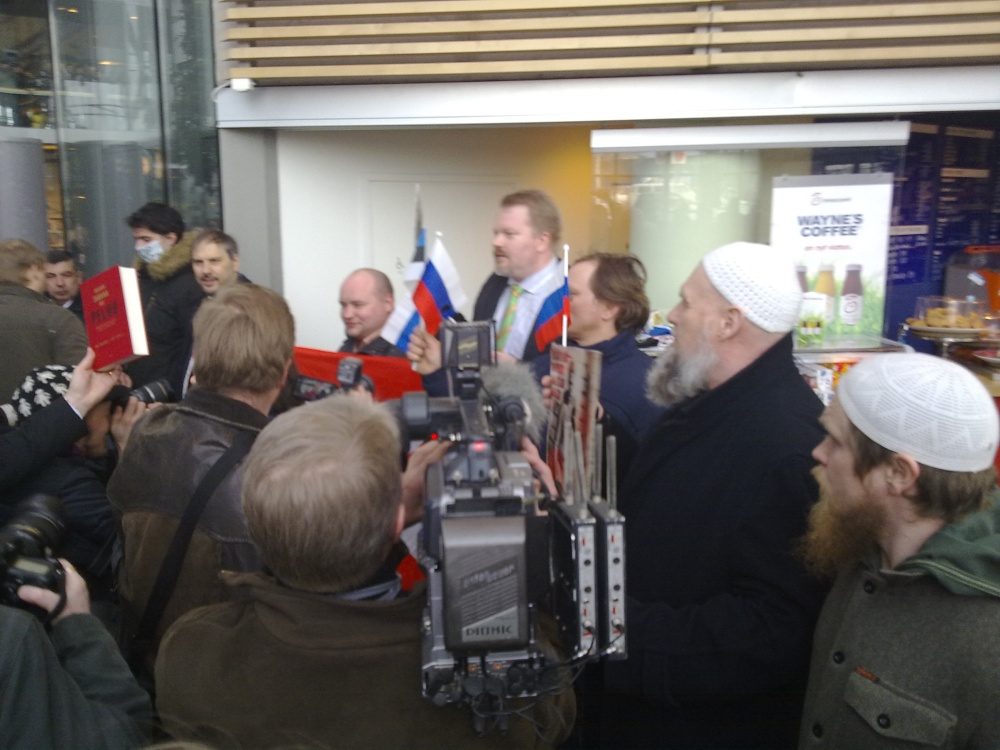
Protest action organised by the Finnish Anti-Fascist Committee in 2009

The Finnish Anti-Fascist Committee (Finnish: Suomen antifasistinen komitea), also known by its Finnish abbreviation SAFKA, is a radical political organisation operating in Finland, founded in 2008 and registered in 2011. According to the Chairperson Johan Bäckman the committee has twenty activists and about a hundred supporters.

In their first manifest from December 2008, they condemned the following phenomena as fascist: school shootings, political activism against the Paris Peace Treaty, as well as the death of the political left. Some members of the group consider the 1917 Bolshevik revolution as "social progress" and views the Soviet Union as a "utopia that was realized in the Swedish welfare state". The group has been heavily criticized in the Estonian media as being "neo-Stalinist". The number of activists in the group is not announced, however at least Johan Bäckman, Leena Hietanen, Petri Krohn and Tommi Lievemaa are members.

== Activities ==
On 23 March 2009, Safka staged a protest in central Helsinki together with Nochnoy Dozor and Nashi against a seminar arranged by the Estonia's embassy in Helsinki discussing the Soviet deportations from Baltic states. Safka claimed in its blog that the event "worshipped Nazi ideology" and was "anti-Russian" in nature. The protest was joined by the prospective Finnish Islamic Party represented by Abdullah Tammi The protest, although attended by only a few dozen protesters received huge media interest in Finland. In comparison, the seminar drew about 300 people.

=== Manifests and declarations ===
Most of SAFKA's public declarations concern the Republic of Estonia, the history of Estonia, and Estonia's right to exist as a sovereign country.

During their demonstrations in Helsinki, SAFKA delivered a manifesto entitled "Manifest of antifascists in Helsinki", signed by seven organisations calling themselves "anti-fascist committees" throughout Europe, condemning what they claim as "apartheid policies of Estonia and Latvia". The manifest claimed that the "attempt of the Baltic regimes at equating Communism with Fascism is a form of Holocaust denial as it denies the unique nature of Nazi crimes".

Following the publication of the final report of the Estonian International Commission for Investigation of Crimes Against Humanity, SAFKA claimed that its chairman, the Finnish diplomat and one-time UN Secretary-General candidate Max Jakobson, is the "ideological father of the criminal apartheid regime of Estonia" and gave him the "misanthropist of the year" award.

=== Political ambitions ===
The committee supported Johan Bäckman in his bid for European Parliament elections.

== Estonian media reception ==
According to Delfi, the committee specialises in justifying Stalinism, particularly reinterpreting the Soviet deportations from Estonia as benign and making accusations regarding supposed human rights violations in Estonia. Journalist Heiki Suurkask, writing for Eesti Päevaleht, has characterised the organization as neo-Stalinist.

== Alleged connections to former KGB affiliates ==
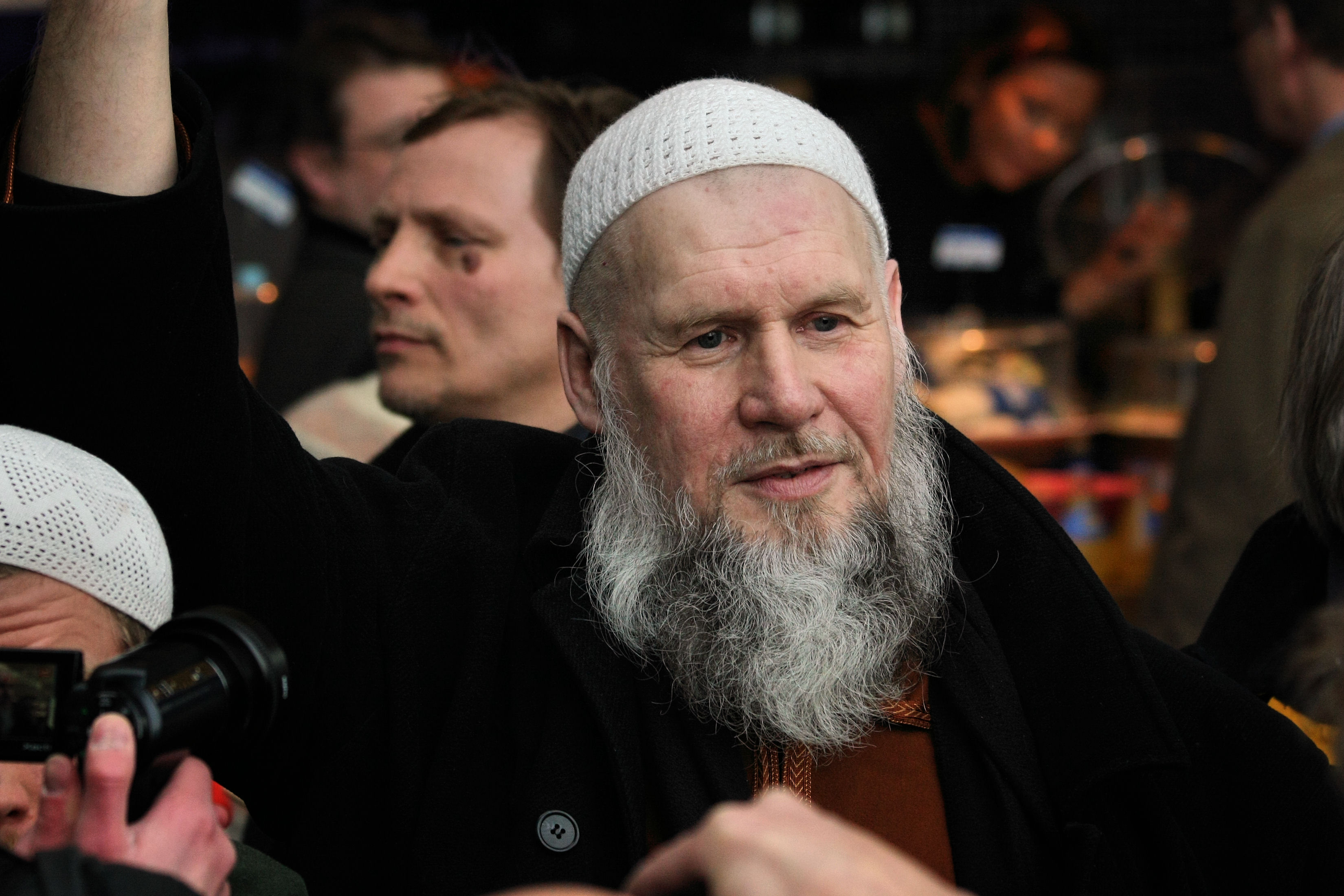
Abdullah Tammi

SAFKA's alleged ties with former KGB affiliates have been discussed in the press. In particular, Abdullah Tammi (born Risto Tammi), a self-identified former KGB informant, participated in one of their demonstrations. Johan Bäckman's book The Bronze Soldier, which brought the committee to limelight, was published by Estonian publishing house Tarbeinfo; Tarbeinfo's primary owner is Vladimir Illyashevich, a former First Department KGB operative.

== Members in politics ==
Three members of Safka unsuccessfully ran in the 2009 European Parliament election. Johan Bäckman got 554 votes (146th of 233) and Leena Hietanen got 247 votes (156th of 233) on the Workers Party of Finland list. Tommi Lievemaa got 204 votes (181st of 233) on the Communist Party of Finland list.

In March 2011, Safka announced it has four candidates for the 2011 Finnish parliamentary election on the Workers Party of Finland list. Candidates were theater and film director Jussi Parviainen, Johan Bäckman, priest Juha Molari and Anton Salonen's mother Rimma Salonen. Parviainen got 457 votes, but other members got only few dozens votes.

== Sister organisations ==
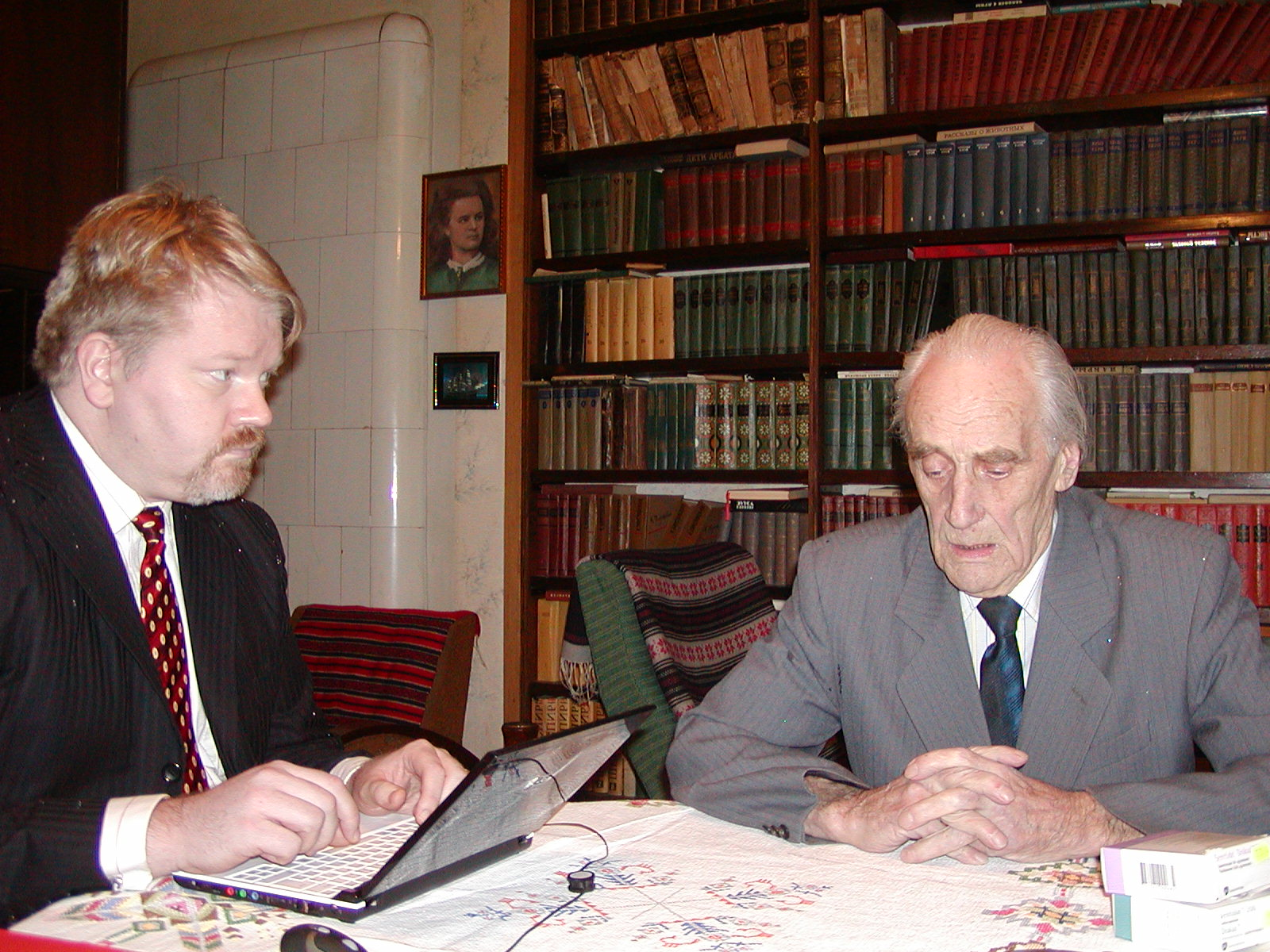
Committee member Johan Bäckman with Arnold Meri, chairman of the Estonian Anti-Fascist Committee

SAFKA has sister organisations in the Baltic states, including the Estonian Anti-Fascist Committee, the Latvian Anti-Fascist Committee and Nochnoy Dozor.

== Sources ==
- Postimees/BNS 14 February 2009 18:43: Öine Vahtkond kavandab ühistegevusi Soome Kremli-meelsetega
- Delfi 17 March 2009 14:14: Bäckman: Eesti kavandab Helsingis provokatsiooni
- Eesti Ekspress 18 March 2009 16:45: Üheskoos Eesti vastu: antifašist Bäckman ja natsimeelne Teinonen, edited by Askur Alas
- Helsingin Sanomat: Russian nationalists plan Helsinki protest
- Delfi 19 March 2009: 16:09 Uurija: marginaalne Naši üritab tähelepanu saada
- Delfi 22 March 2009: 14:58 Soome politsei: Naši üritus pole midagi erilist
- Postimees 23 March 2009 08:50: Helsingi politsei valmistub Putini-noorte meeleavaldusteks, edited by Mari Kamps
- Eesti Ekspress 23 March 2009 12:43: Räige Eesti-vastane kampaania käib kolmes riigis korraga, edited by Askur Alas
- Helsingin Sanomat 23 March 2009 13:04–15:24: Viro-kirjan julkaisu keräsi Sanomataloon 300 hengen yleisön
- Hufvudstadsbladet 23 March 2009 13:31–16:48: Tyst protest av Putinunga by Staffan Bruun and Marcus Lillkvist
