= Consulate General of Finland, Saint Petersburg =

Former diplomatic mission of Finland to Russia

Consulate-General of Finland in Saint Petersburg Генеральное консульство Финляндии в Санкт-Петербурге Suomen pääkonsulaatti Pietari
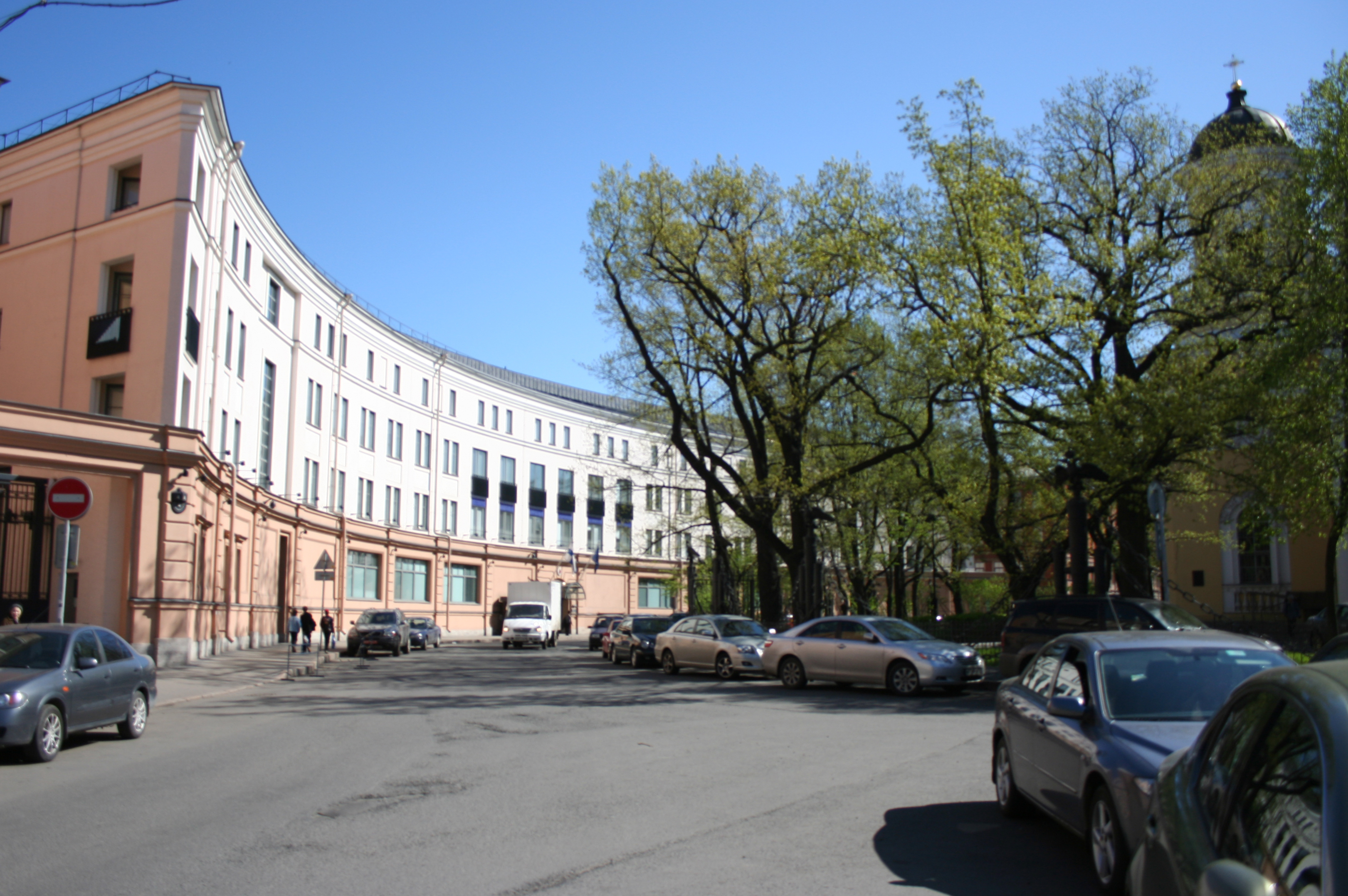
- Location: Saint Petersburg
- Address: 4 Preobrazhenskaya Square

The Consulate-General of Finland in Saint Petersburg was the consulate-general of the Republic of Finland in Saint Petersburg, Russian Federation. It was located at four Preobrazhenskaya Square (Russian: Преображенская пл. 4) in the Tsentralny district of Saint Petersburg.

== See also ==
- Finland–Russia relations
- Diplomatic missions in Russia
- Anton incident
