= Arnold Meri =

Estonian soldier allied with the Soviet Union

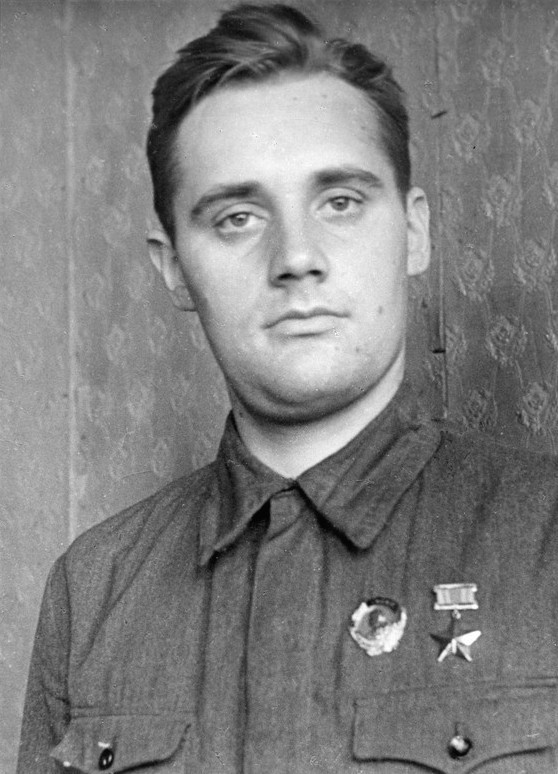
- Born: 1 July 1919; Tallinn, Estonia
- Died: 27 March 2009 (aged 89); Tallinn, Estonia
- Military career
- Allegiance: USSR
- Branch: Red Army
- Service years: 1941–1945
- Rank: Colonel
- Conflicts: World War II
- Awards: Hero of the Soviet Union

Arnold Meri (1 July 1919 – 27 March 2009) was a Soviet World War II veteran and the first Estonian Hero of the Soviet Union. After Estonia restored its independence, he was later charged with genocide for his role in the deportation of Estonians to the inhospitable regions of the USSR. He was a first cousin of the President of Estonia, Lennart Meri. At the time of his death, Meri was an honorary chairman of the Estonian Anti-Fascist Committee.

== Early life ==
His parents were Konstantin Meri, an Estonian, and Olga (née Danndorff), a Russified German from Saint Petersburg, the daughter of a wealthy merchant. In 1926, due to economic reasons and political convictions, Meri's family emigrated to Yugoslavia, which was the main centre of the White emigrants. There, Arnold's father worked as a chef and his mother as a maid and young Arnold was baptised into the Russian Orthodox church and renamed Adrian. He completed Russian primary school in Skopje and at the Russian-Serbian Gymnasium in Belgrade in 1938. After returning to Estonia, he took a job as an intern at AS Franz Krull, but he was soon called on to serve in the auto-tank regiment of the Estonian military. After the Soviet occupation in 1940, he was elected to the City Komsomol Committee in Tallinn and was instructed to create a Komsomol organization in his Estonian army unit. After the absorption of his unit into the Red Army 22nd Estonian Territorial Rifle Corps, he was appointed a deputy political officer in the 415th Radio Battalion.

== Military career ==
After the start of Operation Barbarossa on 22 June 1941, the 22nd Estonian Territorial Rifle Corps retreated to the Porhov region. Meri was wounded four times during the battle while serving as a platoon commander in north-west Russia in 1941. In August 1941, he was awarded a Gold Star of the Hero of the Soviet Union for organizing the defense of the headquarters of the 22nd Estonian Territorial Rifle Corps when the German army broke through the lines near Dno in July 1941. In reality, the defense was commanded by captain Arnold Isotamm, but he was not deemed to be suitable for the decoration, as he was not a member of the Communist Party and had been an officer of the Estonian Army. Meri was specifically commended for remaining on the battlefield despite being wounded four times. Meri retired from the Red Army as a colonel. The building that housed the headquarters of the 22nd Estonian Rifle Corps in July 1941 is currently occupied by a secondary school. In 2008 the school was renamed in honour of Arnold Meri.

From 1945 to 1949, he served as the secretary of the central committee of the Leninist Young Communist League of Estonia. In 1948, he was awarded the highest Soviet order, the Order of Lenin. Meri's opinion on the Estonian part in World War II:

Estonia's participation in World War II was inevitable and only a fool could have believed otherwise. ... Every Estonian had only one decision to make: whose side to take in that bloody fight – the Nazis' or the anti-Hitler coalition's.

After the internal struggle within the Estonian Communist Party, which his "home communist" faction lost, he was stripped from his posts in 1950, then stripped of his honours and expelled from the party in 1951. In order to escape potential arrest, he settled in the Altai Republic with his new family. He was rehabilitated in 1956.

== Involvement in deportation and the charge of genocide ==
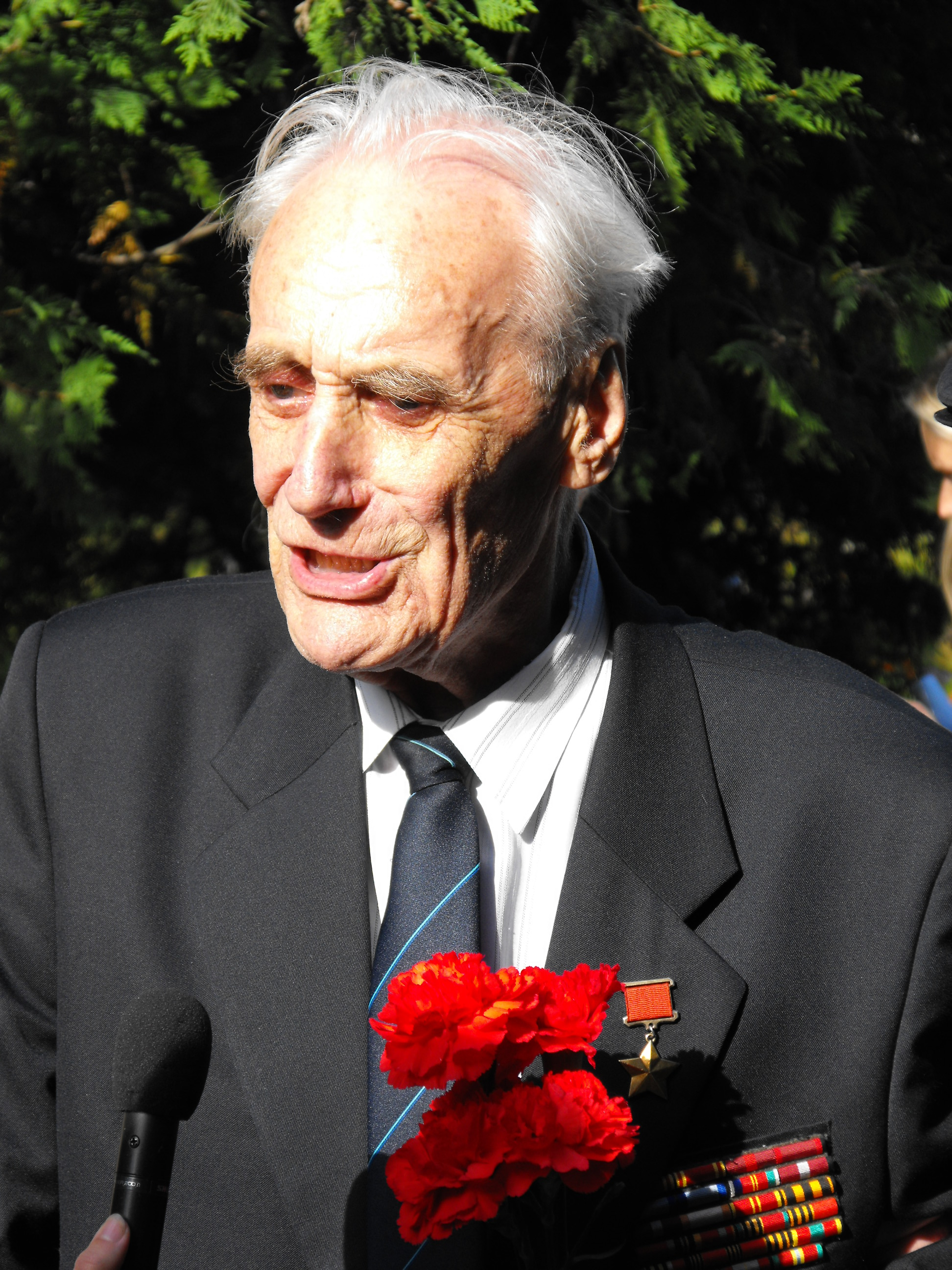
Meri in 2008

In 2003, the Estonia Security Police investigated Meri for participating in the deportations of Estonians in Hiiumaa in 1949. In August 2007, three months after the April Events, the Estonian Western Circuit Prosecutor's Office formally charged Arnold Meri with genocide, for his admitted role in organising the deportation of 251 Estonian civilians from the island of Hiiumaa to the Novosibirsk region of Siberia. According to the Prosecutor's Office, most of the deportees were women and children, and 43 subsequently died. Meri had acknowledged taking part in the deportations, but denied responsibility. According to the BBC, Estonia's claims that genocide took place are not widely accepted.

On 20 May 2008 the trial against Meri began. Meri pleaded not guilty. In his defense, Meri maintained that he was appointed to monitor the compliance of the process with then-current laws and to ensure that the punitive actions were limited to the individuals specifically listed by security services. Meri claimed that he was unable to control the abuses of the local authorities and withdrew from the process. For this decision he himself was prosecuted, stripped of his military honors and expelled from the Communist Party in 1949. Meri maintained that he was targeted by the current Estonian authorities in retaliation for his anti-fascist activities and harsh critique of the Estonian government.

== Death ==
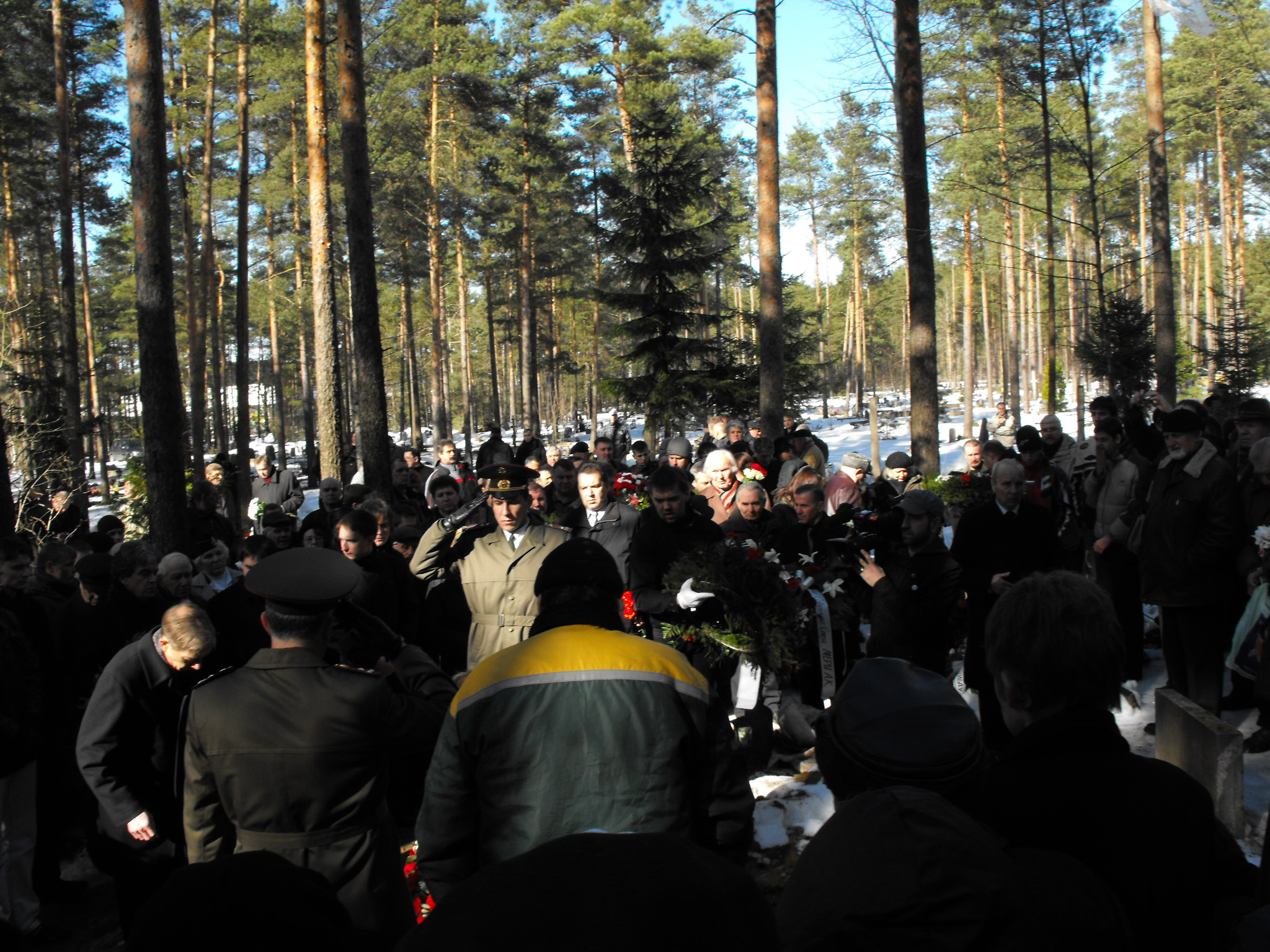
Official representatives of the Pskov region honoring the wreath laying ceremony

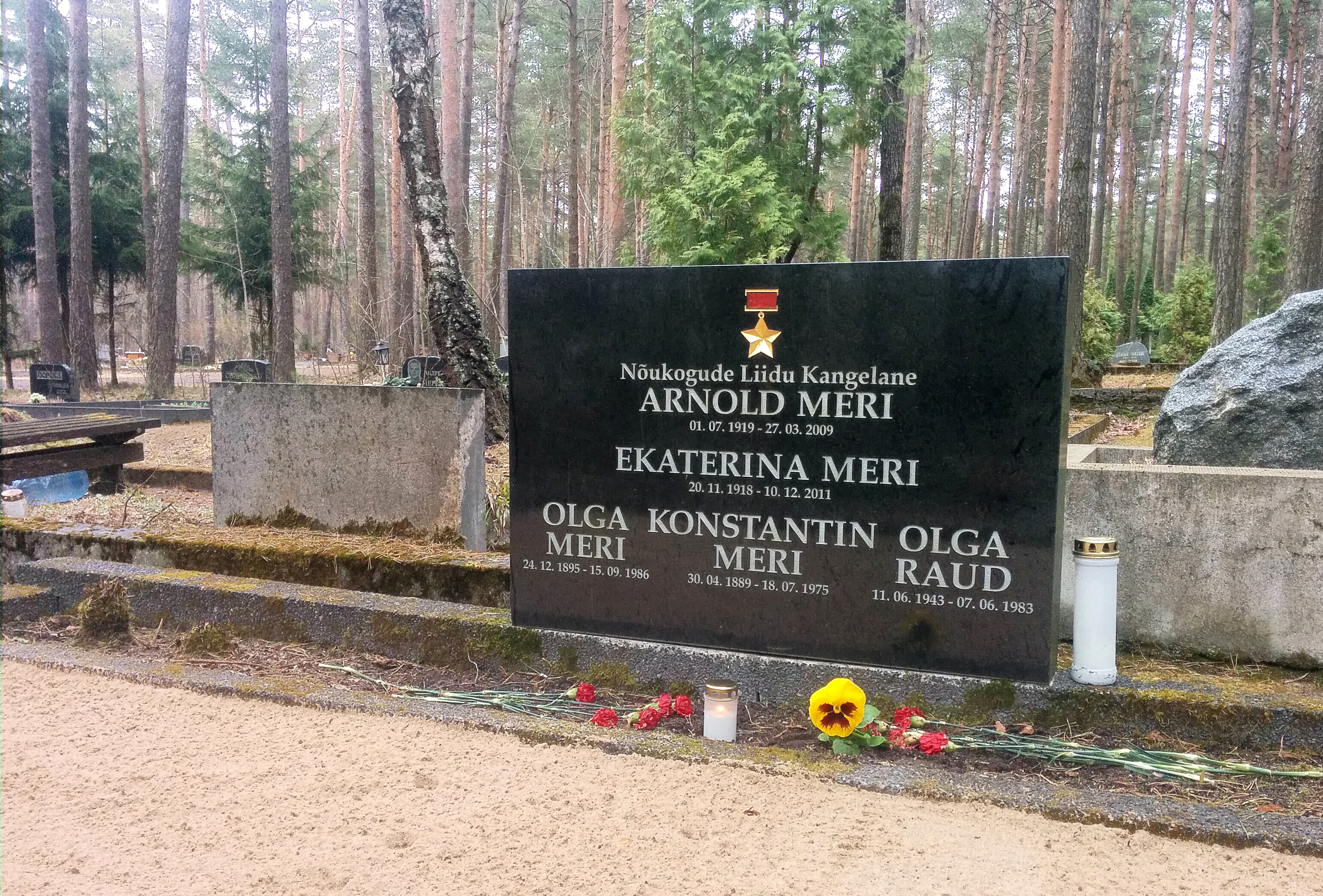
Arnold Meri's tombstone at Liiva cemetery in Tallinn, Estonia.

Arnold Meri died in his sleep on 27 March 2009 at the age of 89. This automatically halted Meri's trial.

The President of Russia Dmitry Medvedev posthumously awarded Meri the Order of Honour within hours of Meri's death. In a telegram to Meri's widow, Yekaterina, Medvedev wrote "Arnold Meri was an exceptional and courageous figure, who devoted his entire life to the ideals of justice, freedom and humanism. Decorated with the Hero of the Soviet Union for his feats on the battlefields of the Great Patriotic War, he fought Nazism to the end of his days, and actively resisted attempts to rewrite history and whitewash those responsible for the twentieth century’s greatest tragedy, and their accomplices."

Meri was interred on 1 April 2009 in the Liiva Cemetery on the outskirts of Tallinn in a funeral which was attended by several hundred people.

== Awards ==
- Hero of the Soviet Union
- Medal of Zhukov
- Two Orders of Lenin
- Order of the Patriotic War 1st and 2nd class
- Two Orders of the Red Banner of Labour
- Two Orders of the Red Star
- Order of the Badge of Honour
- Order of Friendship of Peoples
- Order of Honour
