= Finnish Islamic Party =

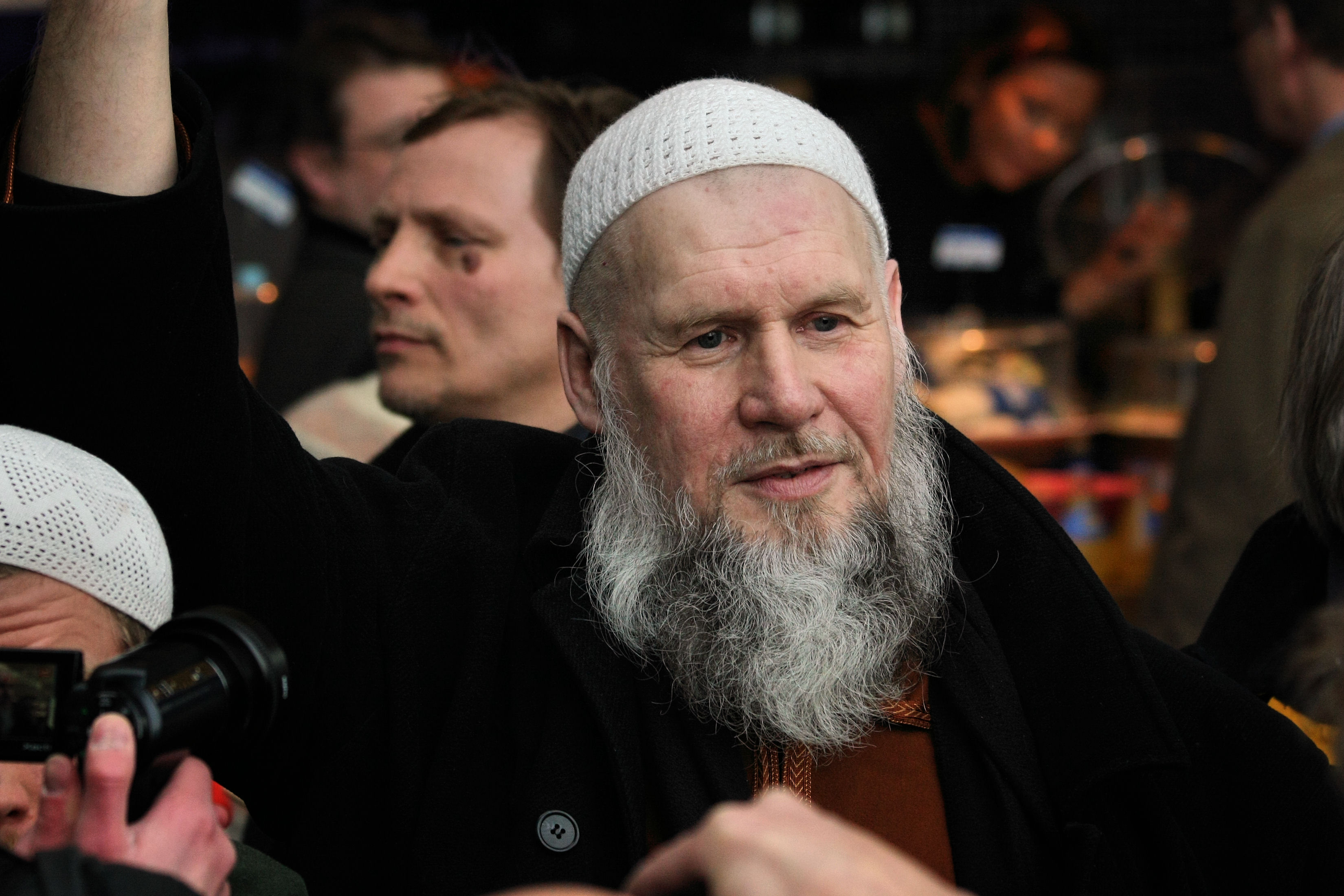
- Former party chairman Abdullah Tammi
- Abbreviation: SIP
- Founder: Abdullah Tammi
- Founded: September 2007
- Ideology: Islamism

Website
- www.suomenislamilainenpuolue.fi/etuEN.html

Finnish Islamic Party (Finnish: Suomen islamilainen puolue, SIP) is an Islamist association in Finland that unsuccessfully aimed for the status of a registered political party. It was founded in September 2007 by Abdullah Tammi, a Finnish convert to Islam.
