= Finlandssvensk samling =

Non-government organisation in Finland

Finlandssvensk samling (Finland-Swedish Association) is a non-government affiliated organisation in Finland that strives to protect the linguistic, cultural and human rights of the Finland Swedes. It was founded in 2001 by Gösta von Wendt.

It should not be confused with Swedish Assembly of Finland.

== See also ==
- Swedish Assembly of Finland
- Swedish People's Party
