= Fjalarr =

Fjalar may refer to:

- Fjalar and Galar, dwarf brothers in Norse mythology who killed the god Kvasir and turned his blood into the mead of poetry
- Fjalar, the mythical red rooster that will herald the beginning of Ragnarök in Norse mythology
- The name of Rusky's horse in The Brothers Lionheart
- Fjalar Þorgeirsson (born 1977), Icelandic footballer
- Fjalar Finnäs (born 1953), Finnish professor of demographics
- King Fjalar, a character in book Kung Fjalar (1844) written by Finnish Johan Ludvig Runeberg
