= Mandatory Swedish =

Compulsory teaching of the Swedish language in Finnish schools

Swedish is a mandatory school subject for Finnish-speaking pupils in the last four years of primary education (grades 6 to 9). This other domestic language is also mandatory in high schools, vocational schools, universities and vocational universities. Furthermore, students graduating in Finnish-language must demonstrate a certain level of proficiency in Swedish (often called "public servant's Swedish"; it works in the opposite way for Swedish-language graduates). Altogether, 89% of Finnish citizens are native Finnish speakers, whereas 5.3% of the population report Swedish as their mother tongue. It is currently possible for Finnish citizens to report a different mother tongue for themselves as many times as desired by submitting a form to the Population Register Center.

According to the Finnish constitution and Language Act, both Finnish and Swedish are national languages, and employees of the national government and the bilingual municipal governments are required to be capable of serving citizens in both languages. The official term for both mandatory Swedish and Finnish is the other domestic language. The requirement to study Swedish is often referred to as pakkoruotsi, a somewhat charged term in Finnish meaning "mandatory Swedish" or "forced Swedish," and similarly, Finnish as a mandatory school subject for native Swedish speakers in Finland is sometimes referred to as "mandatory Finnish" or "enforced Finnish" (tvångsfinska). As Finnish is a much more prevalent language across the country, the inclusion of Swedish as a mandatory subject is especially a controversial topic. As an autonomous region, Åland is exempt from the bilingualism requirement and remains exclusively Swedish-speaking.

In 2019, the Finnish Swedish People's Party almost succeeded in restoring compulsory Swedish in university entrance exams. In the same year, it proposed lowering the level of Finnish required for Swedish-speaking civil servants and organizing a campaign in other Nordic countries to get students to study in Swedish-speaking institutions in Finland entirely in Swedish. In 2025, the party proposed introducing compulsory Swedish teaching for Finnish-speaking children under school age.

== History ==
The area that today is Finland was an integral part of Sweden proper from the Middle Ages to the end of the Finnish War in 1809. Swedish migrants settled in coastal areas, and the language of administration was Swedish. This prompted many Finnish-speakers to learn Swedish in hopes of improving their social status, with some finn-speaking specially in Uusimaa switching to Swedish altogether.

Following the Finnish War, Sweden ceded Finland to Russia, and the Russian tsar established the autonomous Grand Duchy of Finland. Although a Governor-General was installed by the Russians as the highest authority within the Grand Duchy, much of the political system remained the same: Finland was allowed to keep its ”laws, religion and language” from the Swedish time. The tsar wanted to avoid trouble in the new territory, and also used former Swedish upper class to further modernization in Russia; Finnish could not be used as an official language at this time because the administration did not know Finnish well enough and the language was undeveloped regarding such use.

When Finland became an autonomous Grand Duchy, there was a big interest in the mostly Swedish speaking upper class in creating a new national identity and exploring the Finnish language and Finnish culture. At some point, the Fennoman movement arose, arguing that the country should be a united nation, with only one language. As a reaction, the Svecoman movement began and grew in strength, representing fears that abandoning Swedish would lead to slavicisation or worse.

However, during the 1860s, under Tsar Alexander II, legal equality between Finnish and Swedish as languages of administration gradually began to be introduced. Thus, since the late 19th century, Finnish has been a co-official language of administration in Finland. Modernizations typical for the era were introduced, boosting the status of the Finnish-speaking majority: the special rights of the higher estates of the realm were abolished, and a modern parliament based on universal suffrage was introduced 1907. Eventually, in 1917, Finland became independent.

The current form of mandatory Swedish was implemented as a part of the modernization of the educational system in the 1970s, on the initiative of the Swedish People's Party and Johannes Virolainen. Previously, a Swedish test had been compulsory on university level and in oppikoulu, a secondary school that was a prerequisite to matriculation to a university, but not in the common kansakoulu. The introduction of the peruskoulu (student ages 7–15), compulsory for all children, introduced a course in Swedish compulsory to all pupils, while Swedish courses and standardized tests at higher levels remained mandatory. This was primarily motivated by the possibility that any student could become a public official, and would thus be required to know Swedish. The requirement was extended from last three years of primary education to four in 2016, and since 2022 there are three Swedish lessons a week.

According to education experts, English should have been made a mandatory subject in comprehensive schools (previously, foreign languages were generally not taught at all in Finnish comprehensive schools), but at the last minute, the mandatory foreign language for all Finnish speakers was changed from English to Swedish at the insistence of the Finnish-Swedish interests party, the Swedish People's Party, against the wishes of education experts.

== Current situation ==
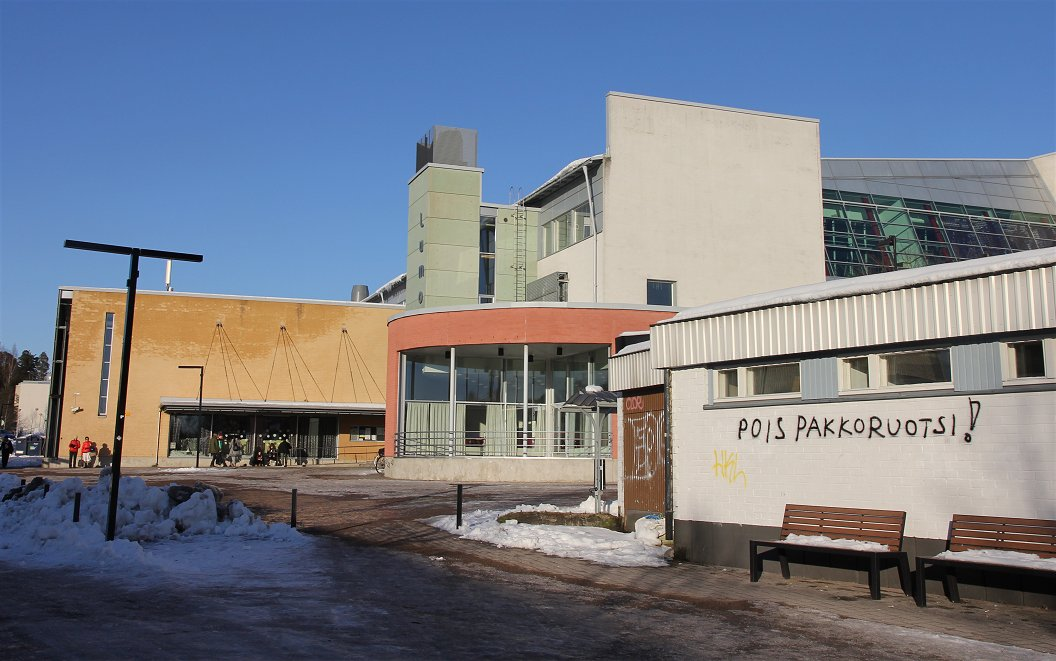
Pois pakkoruotsi! ("Away with mandatory Swedish!"), graffito on wall of a high school (lukio/gymnasium) in Korso, Vantaa in 2016

A compulsory introductory course to Swedish for all pupils in primary education was introduced in 1972–1981 as a part of modernization of the primary education system, at the same time the nine-year school (peruskoulu, grundskola) was made universally compulsory. Until then, there had been mandatory courses only in secondary and tertiary education. Since the end of the 19th century, administrative services have been offered in both domestic languages; therefore, employees are proficient in both Finnish and Swedish. The reform was based on a political ambition to strengthen ties with the Western world through Scandinavia, and to show that Finland was a part of the Nordic countries, not an Eastern Bloc country. It also sought to improve social mobility by ensuring that a decision on language in the early school years would not become an obstacle for applicants to the civil service.

In the upper secondary general school all students learn at least two languages besides their mother tongue, one of which is the other domestic language, except for people studying some other language as their mother tongue (e.g. immigrants and those studying Sami). Finnish speakers take Swedish, and vice versa. According to Statistics Finland, practically all the students take English, either as a compulsory or an optional language. There is also a possibility to take one or more extra foreign languages. Despite Finland being a neighbor of Russia, Russian is not taught in most schools of Finland, and only 1.5% of Finns know some Russian.

The arrangement of "mandatory Swedish and practically-mandatory English" has been criticized as reducing the diversity of the language skills of the population. The EU target is to teach two foreign languages; as English is an overwhelmingly popular choice, it has been suggested by, for example, the Confederation of Finnish Industries that keeping Swedish compulsory directly prevents choosing other languages.

In politics, the role of the Swedish language is mostly represented by the Swedish People's Party.

== Surveys ==
The share of respondents in favour of voluntary Swedish according to a series of surveys by Taloustutkimus
Year	In favour
1990	66%
1991	66%
1997	72%
1999	71%
2001	67%
2003	67%
2007	63%
2013	63%

A number of studies into opinions regarding mandatory Swedish have been made with various results. The large differences between studies exemplifies the problems in conducting a neutral and broad study without asking leading questions on the subject. Furthermore, some of the studies have been commissioned by organizations that have politically partisan views on the subject of mandatory Swedish.

Between 1990 and 2003, Taloustutkimus Oy conducted more than ten surveys for Suomalaisuuden liitto, an organization opposing mandatory Swedish. According to these surveys, 66–72% of Finns were "in favor of voluntary Swedish education or against mandatory Swedish education".

Suomen Gallup's 2003 survey concluded that while a small majority supported "compulsory second domestic language studying", it was opposed by 42% of Finns, and 25% did not want both Finnish and Swedish to be official languages of Finland. This study was commissioned by Yle, the Finnish publicly funded national broadcasting company. The question posed to those surveyed was very verbose in comparison to the Taloustutkimus surveys on the same subject. The question did not include the word "Swedish".

In 1992, a study by Valitut Palat (the Finnish edition of Reader's Digest) concluded that 90 percent of parents of third to fourth grade pupils "supported a reduction of compulsory languages" (only Finnish and Swedish are compulsory). When Valitut Palat did a new survey in 2003 it found 64% opposed mandatory Swedish, and 25% did not desire two official languages.

An IEA study (2000) revealed that 67% of young people studying in Finnish-speaking schools wanted to make Swedish a voluntary subject. The most politically aware youths were the most critical against Swedishness in this study.

A study conducted in 1997 by Folktinget, an official consultative organization representing Finland's Swedish-speakers, concluded that 70% of the Finnish-speaking population considered "Swedish a vital and important part of Finnish society." This study also indicated that the most negative opinions about mandatory Swedish were found among those with academic degrees.

A study conducted by Taloustutkimus for Yle in 2013 indicated that 63 percent of respondents were opposed to mandatory Swedish. Further, the study indicated that among the supporters of the different political parties, only supporters of the Swedish People's Party and the Green League favoured retaining mandatory Swedish teaching. A majority of supporters in all other parties wanted Swedish teaching to be voluntary – the supporters of the Finns Party and the Social Democrats were most heavily in favor of making Swedish voluntary (76 and 73 percent respectively).

A study conducted by Åbo Akademi in 2014 indicated that 74 percent of Finnish speaking respondents agreed with the statement "The teaching of the Swedish language should be voluntary".

== Opinions ==
"Away with mandatory Swedish". A campaign logo against mandatory Swedish. The character on the logo throws away an Å, a letter found in Swedish (and Norwegian and Danish) words, but not in native Finnish.

In many cases, pupils have negative expectations and experiences of learning Swedish, which may foster a negative attitude towards the Swedish language and culture. This behavior is claimed to hark back to a time when Finland was a part of Sweden (see Finland under Swedish rule), and Swedish was the language of prestige while Finnish was looked down on by the government. Negative opinions towards studying Swedish are also grounded in the fact that mandatory Swedish is taught throughout the country, even though there are very few Swedish-speakers in mainland Finland outside the coastal area by the Baltic Sea. This fact can make the policy of bilingualism seem artificial, but the basic curriculum remains the same for the entire country.

Supporters of Mandatory Swedish argue that the policy brings Finland closer to the Nordic countries, since Swedish is part of the larger Scandinavian dialect continuum and mutually intelligible with both Danish and Norwegian. On the contrary, Finnish belongs to the unrelated Finnic language group. The Scandinavian languages have over 25 million speakers in the Nordic region and are the largest languages by far. They are also the working languages of the Nordic political bodies (the Nordic Council and the Nordic Council of Ministers), and are spoken in all the Nordic countries as majority, official or second languages. Due to this, proponents of mandatory Swedish regard Finnish citizens' knowledge of Swedish is as essential for Finland's ability to be included in Nordic cooperation and maintain its Nordic identity. Supporters argue that knowledge of Swedish gives Finnish citizens access to the culture and labour market of Scandinavia, a region four times the size of Finland. They also believe that it gives Finnish citizens access to Finland's own history, as for 500 years, Swedish was Finland's sole language of prestige and government, used as the medium of administration, the judiciary and higher education. Lastly, they argue mandatory Swedish is necessary to ensure that Swedish-speakers can interact with governmental institutions and get service, such as health care, in their own mother tongue.

Kari Sajavaara (1938–2006), a Finnish applied linguistics researcher and professor at the University of Jyväskylä, argued that although many of the factors in keeping both national languages as mandatory subjects have societal and academic significance, these often elude the students, and that the mandate was a purely political move with neglect to pedagogy, leading to poor practical fluency.

According to a study published in 2002, students are interested in the Swedish language, and find it an important part of education, but they perceived the compulsory nature of Swedish language education lessened their motivation (this argument has been made very frequently in the public debate). The experiment of making the Swedish test voluntary in the matriculation examination (the completion of which is a de facto requirement for university enrollment) was declared successful and has been made permanent. The percentage of students taking the Swedish test has since been constantly dropping and was 67% in 2009 (less than 50% of boys).

There has also been a lot of criticism of the methodology used to teach Swedish and the lack of competence in many of the teachers. This has contributed to students' lack of motivation to study Swedish, and many may not learn to speak the language beyond a very basic level. Some students argue that they will never need Swedish, as its utility in the Finnish job market is limited to a few fields. Moreover, the rationale of mandatory tuition in Swedish and other subjects is to give the students a more general knowledge base, and not to train them for a specific field.

In addition to the direct costs of the tuition, some argue that mandatory Swedish effectively replaces elective courses in languages such as French, German and Russian, which these persons argue are more important than Swedish in a globalized world. University students are required to not only master their selected field, but also to study at least two languages beside their mother tongue, one of which is obligatorily Swedish for Finnish-speakers. As study material is often in English, this effectively removes the free choice; the two "voluntarily chosen" languages must be Swedish and English. Additionally, very few Finns speak Estonian (which is not taught in most schools), a language of the same Finnic language group as Finnish, and national language of Finland's southern neighbor Estonia (although Finnish is popular in Estonia).

Sentiments toward mandatory Swedish vary. Many prominent politicians (both Finnish- and Swedish-speaking) wholeheartedly support mandatory Swedish in schools, while others oppose it. There have been numerous petitions and other similar campaigns arranged by some small but dedicated organizations to pressure lawmakers into abolishing mandatory Swedish; however, to date, they have had no significant impact on the established policy. Thus, while the ongoing debate is often heated and passionate, the support for mandatory Swedish tuition remains strong enough among politicians for the government not to consider a change of policy.

Mandatory Swedish is supported by most political parties in Finland, like the National Coalition Party, the Centre Party, the Social Democrats and the Left Alliance. The Finns Party opposes mandatory Swedish, and so does the youth wing of the National Coalition Party.

The Finland-Swedish interest Swedish People's Party in Finland would like to increase the number of compulsory Swedish lessons by more than 50%, make Swedish compulsory again in matriculation essays and remove the obligation for Swedish-speaking civil servants to know how to speak Finnish properly. The party also demands that Finnish taxpayers' money be used to pay for a campaign in Sweden, Norway and Denmark to attract people to study in Swedish-speaking educational institutions in Finland.

Anna-Maja Henriksson, a Finnish-Swedish politician specializing in language policy, former chairwoman of the Swedish People's Party, has also demanded that Swedish should be compulsory already in preschool (esikoulu/förskolan). It has not come true, but the demands of the Swedish People's Party of Finland have become even tougher: now the party demands that Swedish be taught as compulsory already in kindergarten. This was one of the election themes of the Swedish People's Party in the municipal elections held in spring 2025.

President Alexander Stubb, at the time minister for foreign affairs, said in 2010 that Swedish should be taught from the first grade of primary school (from 2016 it is compulsory to start from the sixth grade, previously it started from the seventh). He has also said that he and his wife do not speak Finnish but only Swedish and English to their children.

In 2013, the Confederation of Finnish Industries came out in favor of making Swedish teaching voluntary. They referred to a study which indicated that, in the future, Swedish will only be the tenth most important language to Finnish companies. According to Hufvudstadsbladet, the Confederation has subsequently changed their stance and no longer favors making Swedish voluntary, while maintaining the need for learning other languages.

=== In the Finnish Parliament ===
In the 2000s, the government dropped the requirement to take Swedish (or Finnish in the case of the Swedish-speaking minority) as part of the high school matriculation examination.

In 2014, a citizens' initiative demanding an end to mandatory Swedish teaching on all levels of education was brought to the Finnish Parliament. In 2015, the MPs voted (134 to 48) to keep mandatory Swedish. In another vote, the MPs voted (93 to 89) to demand that the government should examine whether a regional experimentation—where another language would be taught instead of Swedish—is possible.

== See also ==
- Finland's language strife
