= Väinö Tanner (geographer) =

Finnish geographer, geologist, professor and diplomat

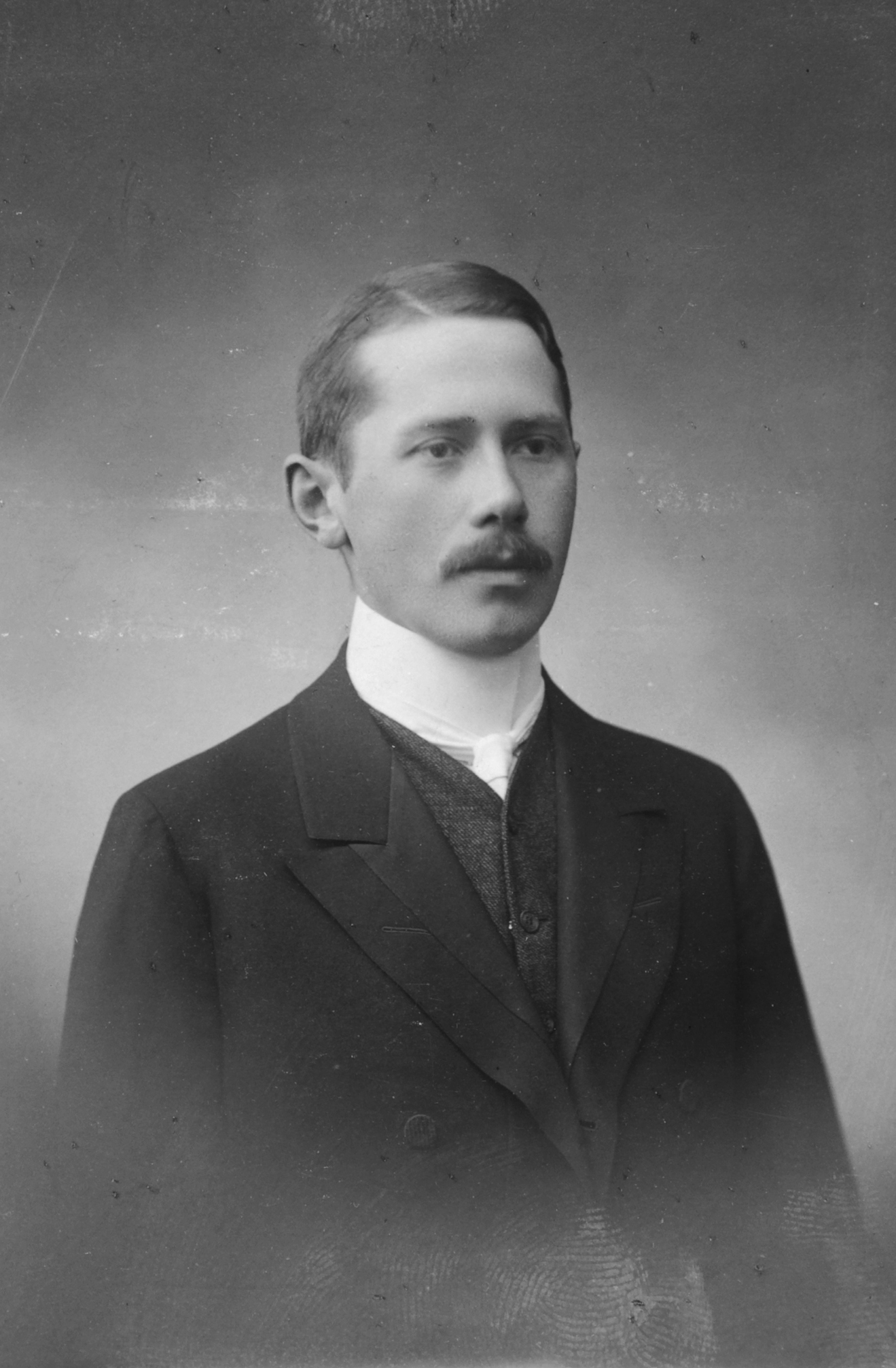
- Born: 10 May 1881; Hämeenlinna
- Died: 26 April 1948 (aged 66); Hässleholm
- Citizenship: Finland; Sweden
- Education: University of Helsinki
- Scientific career
- Fields: Geography; Geomorphology; Quaternary geology
- Workplaces: University of Helsinki

Väinö Tanner (1881–1948) was a Finnish geographer, geologist, professor and diplomat. Tanner is best known for his studies on the Quaternary geology of northern Finland. He was a vocal opponent to the Finnicization of the University of Helsinki.
