= Finland's language strife =

19th-century conflict over language rights in Finland

Finland's language strife (Swedish: Finska språkstriden, lit. 'Finnish language dispute'; Finnish: Suomen kielitaistelu, lit. 'Finnish language struggle') was a major conflict in mid-19th century Finland. Both the Swedish and Finnish languages were commonly used in Finland at the time, associated with descendants of Swedish colonisation and leading to class tensions among the speakers of the different languages. It became acute in the mid-19th century.

== Background ==
Finland had once been under Swedish rule. Swedish (with some Latin) was the language of administration and education in the Swedish Realm. Swedish was therefore the most-used language of administration and higher education among the Finns. To gain higher education, one had to learn Swedish, and Finnish was considered by the upper classes to be a "language of peasants". Immigration of Swedish peasants to Finland's coastal regions also boosted the status of Swedish by sheer number of speakers. Although Mikael Agricola had started written Finnish with Abckiria in the 1500s, and a Finnish translation of the Civil Code of 1734 was published in 1759 (Ruotzin waldacunnan laki), it had no official status as a legal publication since the official language of administration was Swedish.

The rise to the ruling upper class usually required being Swedish-speaking, and therefore the language of some Finnish-speaking families changed completely to Swedish. In the Middle Ages, the majority in the Uusimaa region became Swedish-speaking. Only in the early decades of the 20th century did the Finnish language return to the majority language of Uusimaa.

As a result of the Finnish War, Sweden ceded Finland to Russia in 1809. Finland became the autonomous Grand Duchy of Finland within the Russian Empire. Under Russian rule, the laws of the era when Finland was under Swedish rule remained largely unchanged, and Swedish continued to be used in administration.

The language strife became more acute in the second half of the 19th century. Johan Vilhelm Snellman, a Swede who wished to increase education in Finland, became a chief initiator of conflict in the 1850s due to his concern about the changing language use among the educated classes, many of whom were using Russian or Finnish. He wrote to Finnish author Zachris Topelius in 1860: "My view is this: Whether Russian or Finnish will win, only God knows. I dare not hope for anything. But that Swedish will lose - that I do know." Elias Lönnrot compiled the first Finnish-Swedish dictionary (Finsk-Svenskt lexikon), completing it in 1880.

== Nationalism and the question of language ==
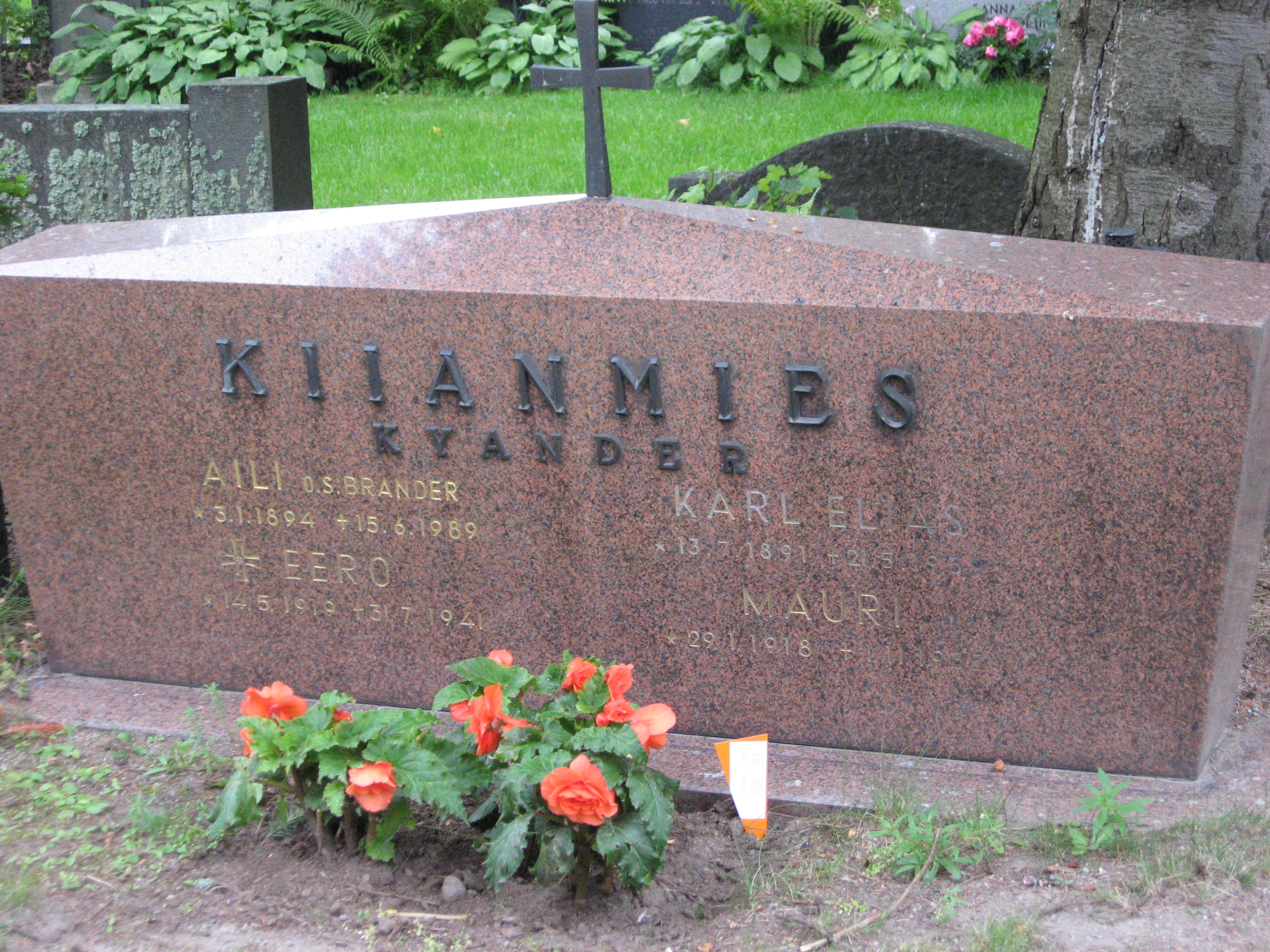
A set of graves in Tampere, showing the Swedish surname 'Kyander' as well as the Fennicized 'Kiianmies'

The rise of Fennomanic Finnish nationalism in the 19th century eventually led to the revived predominance of Finnish use in the country. A significant contribution to the Finnish national awakening from the mid-19th century onward came from the members of the mostly Swedish-speaking upper classes deliberately choosing to promote Finnish culture and language. Snellman was himself an ethnic Swede and was later ennobled. These Finnish Swedes, known as the Fennomans, Fennicized their family names, learned Finnish, and made a point of using Finnish both in public and at home. However, another group of the Swedish-speaking population, the Svecomans, did not wish to abandon Swedish and opposed the Fennoman ideology and Fennoman-inspired reforms.

In 1863 Alexander II (AsK 26/1863) ruled that Finnish had an official language status comparable to that of Swedish; it could thereafter be used in an official capacity in legal and state office matters. Within a generation, the Finnish language use gained predominance in the government and the society of Finland.

During the Russification of Finland, Tsar Nicholas II attempted to change the official language to Russian (Language Manifesto of 1900), but Russification was halted by the general strike of 1905.

== After independence ==
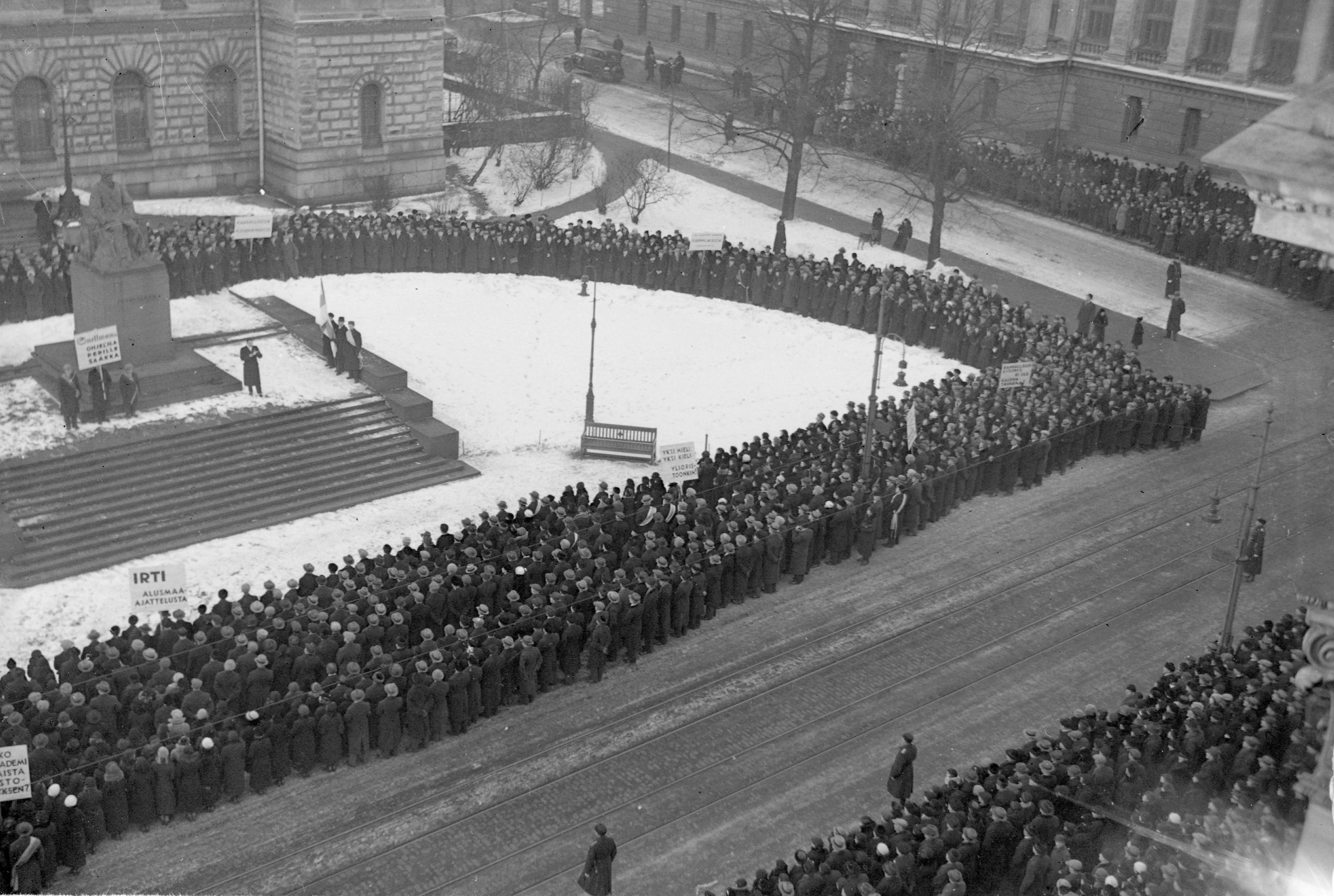
Demonstration for the position of Finnish language in the University at the statue of J. V. Snellman in Helsinki in 1935.

After Finland gained independence in 1917, its relations with Sweden unexpectedly became strained in connection with the Finnish Civil War and the Åland crisis. These events aggravated the language dispute, and the controversy over Swedish and Finnish became a prominent feature of domestic politics during the 1920s and 1930s.

In the newly independent Finnish constitution of 1919, Finnish and Swedish were given equal status as national languages. The language strife thereafter centered on this and on the role of Swedish in universities, particularly regarding the number of professors who spoke and wrote in Swedish in their teaching. In the interwar period, the University of Helsinki was the scene of conflict between those who wanted to advance the use of Finnish and those who wished to maintain the use of Swedish. Geographer Väinö Tanner was one of the most vocal defenders of Swedish. A campaign initiated by the Swedish People's Party of Finland collected 153,914 signatures in defense of Swedish in a petition that was presented to the parliament and government in October 1934. The conflict at the university generated an international reaction when academics from Denmark, Sweden, Norway, and Iceland sent letters to the diplomatic representatives of Finland in their respective countries warning that diminishing the role of Swedish at the university would result in a weakening of Nordic unity.

The government issued a language decree on 1 January 1923 making Finnish and Swedish equal in status.

During the resettlement of more than 420,000 Karelian refugees after the Winter War against the Soviet Union (1939–1940), the Swedish-speaking minority feared that the new Finnish-speaking settlers would change the linguistic balance of their neighborhoods. Since the late 20th century, there has been discussion of whether the policy of mandatory Swedish classes in schools should continue.

== See also ==
- Language revival
- Language policy
