= Swedish Assembly of Finland =

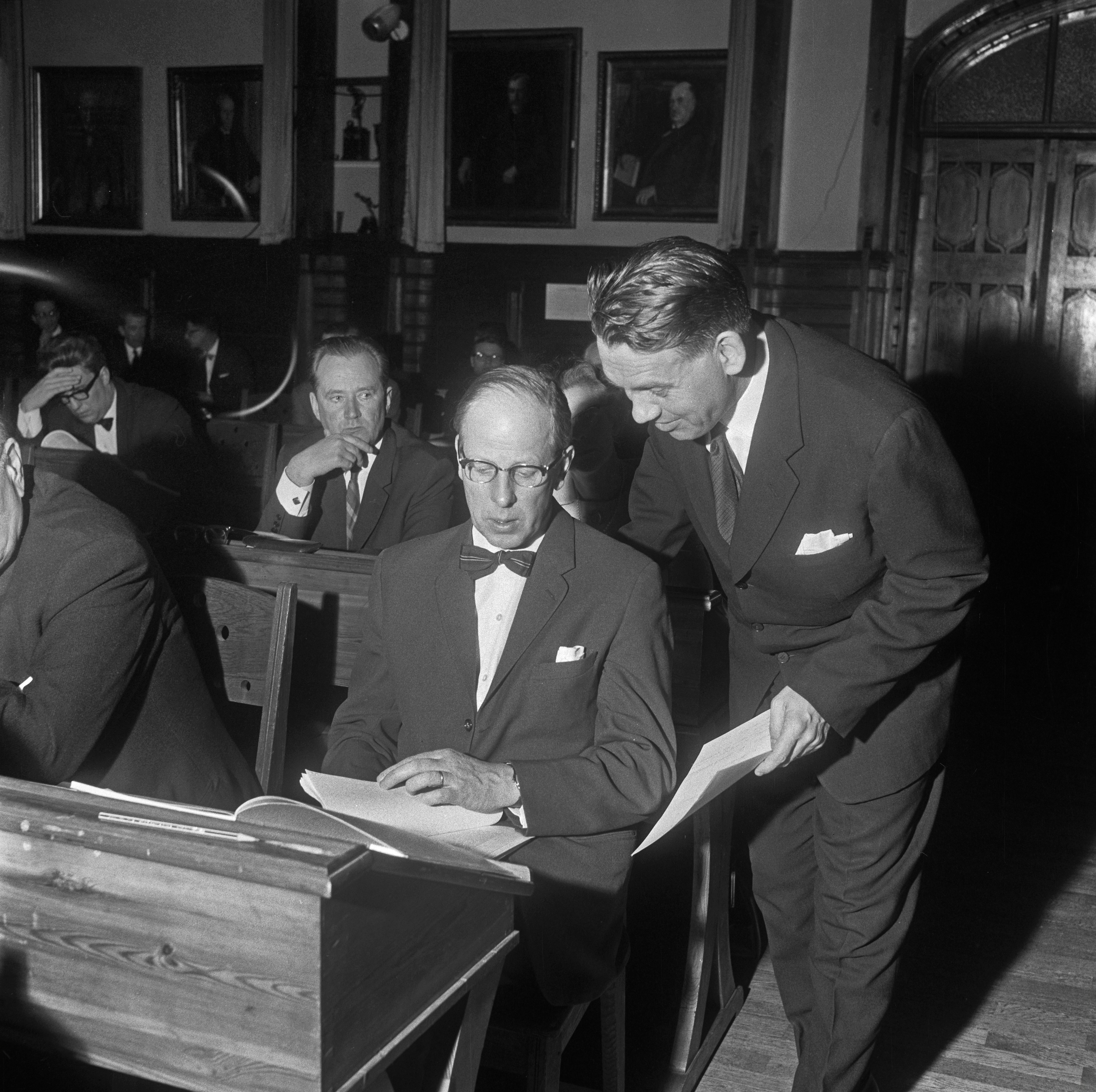
Swedish Assembly of Finland in 1964

The Swedish Assembly of Finland (Swedish: Svenska Finlands folkting, Finnish: Suomenruotsalaiset kansankäräjät, although often referred to as Folktinget even in Finnish) is an official consultative parliament representing the Swedish-speaking minority in Finland.

Folktinget was originally founded in 1919 but dissolved the following year. It was re-established in 1941 when the relocation of Karelian evacuees threatened to shift the balance between Finnish and Swedish speakers in Swedish-speaking municipalities, and has functioned continuously since its re-establishment. Since 2003, its operations have been governed by law.

== Elections ==
Elections are held every four years, and candidates are nominated by the political parties which are either bilingual or Swedish-speaking. The assembly has 75 seats, where 70 are filled on the basis of municipal election results, and five are appointed by the Parliament of Åland (Swedish: Lagtinget).

== Purpose ==
The assembly is a forum for political discussion on issues concerning Swedish speakers, and it also functions as an interest group for the Swedish-speaking population. It also engages in research on demographic issues and publishes information to the public about the situation of the Swedish-speaking Finns.

== Leadership ==
Astrid Thors was chairperson of the Swedish Assembly of Finland from 2005 to 2007. She was succeeded by Ulla-Maj Wideroos in 2007, by Anna-Maja Henriksson in 2009, by Christina Gestrin in 2011, by Thomas Blomqvist in 2015 and by Sandra Bergqvist in 2019.

== See also ==
- Finland's language strife
- Svecoman
- Swedish People's Party
- Yle Teema & Fem
- Thing (assembly)
