= Fjalar Finnäs =

Finnish professor (1953–2023)

Fjalar Finnäs (1953–2023) was a Finnish professor of demographics at the Åbo Akademi University. He focused on the demographics of the Swedish-speaking Finns. His most recent research was in Ethno-Linguistic Exogamy and Divorce.

== Researches ==
- Jan 2014 – Sex composition of children, parental separation, and parity progression
- Feb 2014 – Transitions within and from ethno-linguistically mixed and endogamous first unions in Finland
- Feb 2014 – Infant mortality and ethnicity in an indigenous European population
- Sep 2015 – The Ethno-linguistic Community and Premature Death
- Aug 2017 – Divorce and parity progression following the death of a child
- Mar 2018 – Ethno-Linguistic Exogamy and Divorce
